= William of Saint-Omer =

William of Saint-Omer (French: Guillaume de Saint-Omer) can refer to several members of the House of Saint Omer:

- William I of Saint-Omer, castellan of Saint Omer
- William II of Saint-Omer, castellan of Saint Omer
- William III of Saint-Omer, castellan of Saint Omer
- William IV of Saint-Omer (died 1191), castellan of Saint Omer
- William V of Saint-Omer (ca. 1170–1246), castellan of Saint Omer
- William VI of Saint-Omer, castellan of Saint Omer
- William VII of Saint-Omer, castellan of Saint Omer
- William of Saint-Omer (son of Nicholas I), Master of the Horse of Hungary
- William of Saint-Omer (son of Walter of Tiberias), Crusader noble
