= Anseau de Cayeux =

French knight and nobleman

Coats of arms of seigneurs de Cayeux

Anseau de Cayeux or Anselm de Cayeux (French: Anselme de Cayeux; Greek: Ασέλ δε Kάε) was a French knight from Picardy, who participated in the Fourth Crusade (1202-1204) and later became one of the leading nobles of the Latin Empire of Constantinople, serving under emperors Baldwin I (1204-1205) and Henry I (1206-1216). Regarding later data, scholars are divided. Some hold that it was he who was married (c. 1230) to Byzantine princess Eudokia Laskarina, younger daughter of the former emperor Theodore I Laskaris, and later became regent in Constantinople (1237-1238), while others hold that those data refer to his son of the same name.

== Biography ==
A descendant of the lords of Cayeux-sur-Mer, according to Geoffrey of Villehardouin he took up the cross in spring 1200 along with Hugh IV, Count of Saint-Pol, and remained in the latter's entourage until the fall of Constantinople to the Fourth Crusade in April 1204. According to a letter by Hugh IV, Anseau was among the knights who voted in favour of diverting the Crusade to Constantinople following the Siege of Zara.

Following Hugh's death in 1205, Anseau joined the following of Henry of Flanders, the younger brother of the Latin Emperor, Baldwin I. After Baldwin was captured by the Bulgarians in the Battle of Adrianople, Henry was raised to regent of the Latin Empire. He in turn appointed Anseau as commander of the garrison at Bizye, along with six other knights and a larger number of foot soldiers. From this post he successfully defended the city against the Bulgarian tsar Kaloyan, who in the aftermath of Adrianople had captured most of the other cities in Thrace.

He continues to be mentioned alongside Henry of Flanders (who became Emperor after 1206) in the chronicle of Henry of Valenciennes as Ansil de Kaeu. Along with Conon de Béthune he led in 1207 the unsuccessful negotiations in the Pagasetic Gulf with the Lombard barons under Ravano dalle Carceri, who refused to accept the suzerainty of Emperor Henry.

=== Attribution of later data ===
Regarding various later events, scholars are divided, since some hold that those data refer to Anseau the Crusader of 1204, while other hold that they should be attributed to his son of the same name.

Sometime c. 1230, one Anseau de Cayeux married the Byzantine princess Eudokia Laskarina, a daughter of the Nicaean emperor Theodore I Laskaris. The princess was originally betrothed to the Latin Emperor Robert of Courtenay in 1221, but was rejected by him. She married Frederick II, Duke of Austria, but returned to Constantinople in 1229, and then married Anseau. Following the death of John of Brienne, the senior co-emperor and guardian of Emperor Baldwin II of Constantinople, in March 1237, the same Anseau became regent of the Empire, which was now mostly limited to Constantinople and its environs, as Baldwin II was absent in Western Europe. His title as regent was bailli, and he retained his position for about a year, after which he was replaced by Narjot de Toucy. In 1247, he assigned custody over the city of Tzurulon to his wife Eudokia, in hope that it will not be attacked by John III Doukas Vatatzes, who was married to Eudokia′s sister Irene Laskarina.

As a participant of the Fourth Crusade (1202-1204), Anseau de Cayeux would already approach at least sixty years of age by the 1250, and therefore the attribution of those later data to him is not certain, since it is possible that those data may refer to his son of the same name.

Documents from 1253-1255, issued by the papal chancellery, mention the marriage "inter Anselmum de Keu ac Mariam, natam Matildis dominae de Posaga, natae comitissae Viennensis", designating the bride as "Maria, nate quondam Calojohanni", and also mentioning an uncle of the bride's mother as "imperatore Constantinopolitano, eiusdem Matildis avunculo". Those data allowed Gordon McDaniel to identify the bride as Maria, daughter of John Angelos of Syrmia and Matilda of Požega, also concluding that Matildas's mother was Margaret de Courtenay, sister of Latin Emperor Baldwin II of Constantinople.

In 1269-1270, certain "Anselinus de Chaus, Camerarius Imperii Romani", titular Imperial Camerlengo, or Chamberlain in the service of the same, now exiled Latin Emperor Baldwin II, was residing at the court of king Charles I of Naples. With royal approval, he regulated dowry of his daughter Eva (short for Evdokia), who was married to Dreux de Beaumont-Gâtinais, marshal of the Kingdom of Naples. While residing in the Kingdom of Naples, he also kept contacts with king Stephen V of Hungary (1270-1272): "Anselinus de Chaus dilectus amicus vult mietere nuntium ad magnificum principem Stephanum, illustrem regem Ungarie".

Scholars are also divided on the question, whether data from c. 1230-1247, and those from 1253-1255 and 1269-1270 should be attributed to one person, or to father and son of the same name. If all of those data would be attributed to Anseau the Crusader of 1204, he would be at least eighty or more years old in 1269-1270. Without excluding other possibilities, Michael Angold proposed that data from 1230-1247 should be attributed to his son (Anseau the Regent), while data from 1253-1254 and 1269-1270 would be attributed to Regents son of the same name (Anseau the Chamberlain).

Such conclusion would be supported by an important formulation from the document issued in 1254, regarding the marriage between "Nobili viro Anselmo, nato nobilis viri de Quo, et nobili mulieri Marie, nate quondam Calojohanni". The formulation "Nobili viro Anselmo, nato nobilis viri de Quo" contains an explicit filiation and translates as: "nobleman Anselmo, born from the nobleman of Quo", thus mentioning not only the groom Anselmo (the son), but also his father (the nobleman of Quo) whose name was the same and therefore not repeated.

Advanced age would exclude the possibility that even later data on Anseau de Chau, who served in 1273-1274 as Charles of Naples' vicar-general in Albania, could refer to the participant of the Fourth Crusade (1202-1204) or the Regent of 1237, and therefore it is believed that those data must refer to the youngest Anseau, the Chamberlain, who would be married (since 1253-1255) to Maria, daughter of John Angelos of Syrmia, and later (1269) would serve as camerlengo ("Camerarius Imperii Romani"), and also as governor of Albania (1273-1274). His wife Maria was referred to in some 1280s sources as a sister (lat. soror), or at least a half-sister of Helen, Queen of Serbia (d. 1314), thus allowing scholars to point out that Anseau's wife was through her sister related to the Serbian royal family.

== Bibliography ==
- Angold, Michael (2011). "The Latin Empire of Constantinople, 1204–1261: Marriage Strategies". Identities and Allegiances in the Eastern Mediterranean after 1204. Farnham: Ashgate Publishing Limited. pp. 47–68. ISBN 9781409410980.
- Bácsatyai, Dániel (2017). "A 13. századi francia–magyar kapcsolatok néhány kérdése" (PDF). Századok. 151 (2): 237–278.
- Berger, Élie, ed. (1897). Les Registres d'Innocent IV. Vol. 3. Paris: Fontemoing.
- Bourel de la Roncière, Charles, ed. (1895). Les Registres d'Alexandre IV. Vol. 1. Paris: Thorin.
- Fossier, Robert (1968). La terre et les hommes en Picardie jusqu'à la fin du XIIIe siècle. Paris: Béatrice-Nauwelaerts.
- Geanakoplos, Deno John (1953). "Greco-Latin Relations on the Eve of the Byzantine Restoration: The Battle of Pelagonia–1259". Dumbarton Oaks Papers. 7: 99–141. doi:10.2307/1291057. JSTOR 1291057.
- Mazzoleni, Jole, ed. (1967) [1952]. I registri della Cancelleria Angioina (PDF). Vol. 4 (2nd ed.). Napoli: Accademia Pontaniana.
- McDaniel, Gordon L. (1984). "On Hungarian-Serbian Relations in the Thirteenth Century: John Angelos and Queen Jelena" (PDF). Ungarn-Jahrbuch. 12 (1982-1983): München, 1984: 43–50.
- McDaniel, Gordon L. (1986). "The House of Anjou and Serbia". Louis the Great: King of Hungary and Poland. Boulder: East European Monographs. pp. 191–200. ISBN 9780880330879.
- Perry, Guy (2013). John of Brienne: King of Jerusalem, Emperor of Constantinople, c. 1175–1237. Cambridge: Cambridge University Press. ISBN 9781107043107.
- Petrovitch, Nicolas (2015). "La reine de Serbie Hélène d'Anjou et la maison de Chaources". Crusades. 14: 167–182. doi:10.1080/28327861.2015.12220366. ISBN 9781472468413. S2CID 257002925.
- Porčić, Nebojša (2020). "Serbia in the registers of the Angevin chancery (1265-1295): An attempt at reconstruction". Initial: A Review of Medieval Studies. 8: 119–163.
- Porčić, Nebojša (2021). "Documents of Mary of Cayeux concerning grants to the Abbey of Dommartin and an agreement with the king of England". Initial: A Review of Medieval Studies. 9: 181–208.
- Uzelac, Aleksandar (2025). "Patrimony of Queen Jelena (On the Background of Serbian-Hungarian Conflicts in the Thirteenth and Fourteenth Centuries)" (PDF). Црквене студије: Church Studies. 22: 303–315. Archived from the original on 2025-02-08.
- Van Tricht, Filip (2011). The Latin Renovatio of Byzantium: The Empire of Constantinople (1204–1228). Leiden-Boston: Brill.
- Van Tricht, Filip (2020). "Latin Emperors and Serbian Queens Anna and Helena: Genealogical and Geopolitical Explorations in the Post-1204 Byzantine World". Frankokratia. 1 (1–2): 56–107.
- Robert Lee Wolff, Romania: The Latin Empire of Constantinople (1204-1261) (Harvard, 1947)
