= John Angelos of Syrmia =

Byzantine prince

John Angelos

Governor of Syrmia
- Reign: c. 1227 – c. 1250
- Predecessor: new creation
- Successor: Rostislav Mikhailovich (since the 1250s)
- Born: c. 1193
- Died: before 1250 (aged 50-55)
- Noble family: Angelos
- Spouse: Matilda of Požega
- Issue: Maria of Cayeux, and (possibly) Saint Helen of Serbia
- Father: Isaac II Angelos
- Mother: Margaret of Hungary

John Angelos or Angelus (Greek: Ἰωάννης Ἄγγελος, Hungarian: Angelos János; c. 1193 – d. before 1250), also known as Good John (Greek: Καλοϊωάννης / Kaloiōannēs, Hungarian: Kaloján), was a Byzantine prince who migrated to Hungary, and served as governor of various southern regions, including Syrmia, from 1227 until c. 1250, during the reign of Hungarian kings Andrew II and Béla IV, who were his maternal relatives.

== Life ==
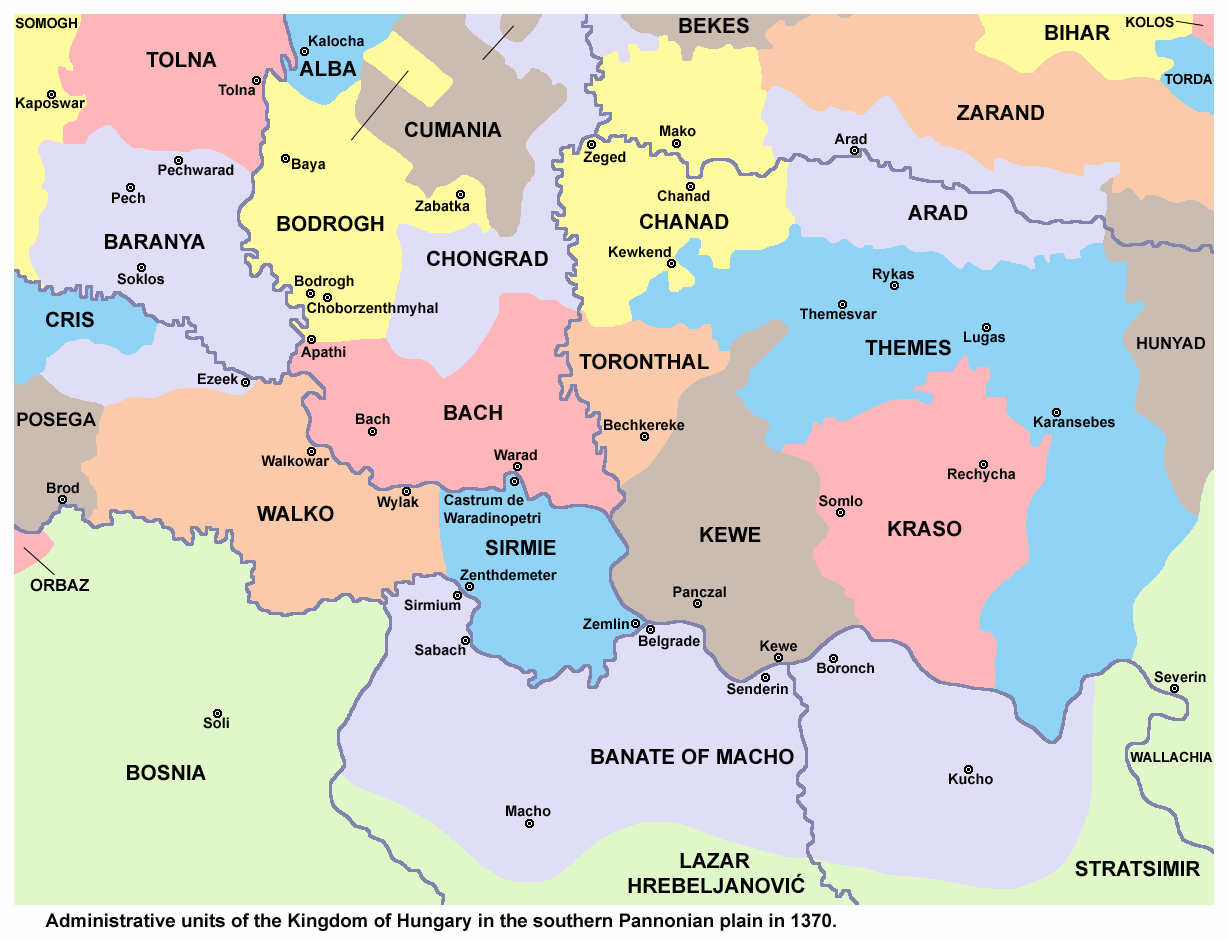
Administrative units in the southern regions of the Kingdom of Hungary, with Syrmia in the center (blue)

John Angelos was the son of Isaac II Angelos, the Byzantine Emperor from 1185 to 1195, and again from 1203 to 1204, from his second marriage with Margaret of Hungary, the daughter of King Béla III (r. 1172–1196). John had three older half-siblings from his father's first marriage: Anna-Euphrosyne, Irene Angelina and Alexios IV Angelos, while he also had a younger full brother, Manuel Angelos (b. after 1195 – d. 1212). In 1195, his father was deposed, but restored to the throne in 1203, together with Alexios IV, both of them being deposed and murdered in 1204, while empress Margaret and her sons John and Manuel survived the Sack of Constantinople. Soon after, they left for Thessalonica, where Margaret was remarried to Boniface of Montferrat, the King of Thessalonica. Boniface died in 1207, and Margaret became regent for her infant son Demetrius who succeeded his father Boniface as King of Thessalonica, keeping her older sons Manuel and John by her side.

Margaret lost regency in 1216-1217, and remarried to Nicholas I of Saint-Omer. The family later moved to the Hungarian court c. 1220, where John entered into royal service. Margaret's brother, King Andrew II of Hungary (r. 1205–1235), gave them possessions in various southern regions of the Kingdom of Hungary. Those possessions were inherited by her sons, both John and his half-brother William of Saint-Omer, who also came to Hungary. John ruled in "Syrmia and beyond", i.e. regions south of the Sava river, including Belgrade and Macsó, at least until 1242, or sometime later.

In 1225, Ugrin Csák, the Archbishop of Kalocsa, tried to organize the Bosnian Crusade, and attempted to commission local feudal lords for that endeavor. The Archbishop gave 200 silver marks to John Angelos, the lord of Syrmia, to perform the task. John took the money but never acted against the Bosnian heretics, despite being reminded of his obligation by Pope Honorius III in 1227.

During the 1230s and early 1240s, John continued to play a prominent role both in southern regions of the Kingdom of Hungary and in the Hungarian royal court. He died by 1250, since in the July of that year his wife Matilda was already mentioned as "noble lady, widow of lord John, countess of Požega" (lat. nobilis domine relicte domini Johannis, comitisse de Posoga), and later documents related to marriage of their daughter Maria also mention him as deceased.

== Issue ==
John was married to Matilda (born c. 1210 – d. after 1255), daughter of Margaret Courtenay, from her first marriage with Raoul III, Lord of Issoudun. Matilda's mother Margaret was daughter of Peter of Courtenay, Latin emperor of Constantinople (1217-1219), and thus sister of Latin emperors Robert I and Baldwin II. In second marriage, Margaret became the wife of Henry I, Count of Vianden.

John and Matilda had a daughter Maria, who was married to Anselm of Cayeux. Their marriage licenses were issued from 1253 to 1255, by the papal chancellery. The first of those documents mentions the marriage "inter Anselmum de Keu ac Mariam, natam Matildis dominae de Posaga, natae comitissae Viennensis", and also mentions Matilda's maternal uncle as "imperatore Constantinopolitano, eiusdem Matildis avunculo", while the second document mentions "Maria, nate quondam Calojohanni". Those data allowed Gordon McDaniel to resolve genealogical questions related to Maria's parents, while the identity of John's son-in-law and Maria's husband Anselm of Cayeux was a subject of several additional genealogical and historical studies, that tried to resolve complex questions related to attribution of sources on at least two persons (father and son) who had the same name: Anseau de Cayeux.

In the summer of 1280, king Charles I of Sicily allowed John's daughter Maria to travel from Apulia to Serbia, to visit her sister, the queen of Serbia (Latin: Quia nobilis mulier domina Maria de Chaurs cum filio suo et familia eiusdem domine intendit transfretare ad presens ad partes Servie visura dominam reginam Servie sororem suam). In later documents, issued in 1281, Maria was mentioned by king Charles as his cousin (Latin: nobilis mulier Maria domina Chau consanguinea nostra carissima), and widow of Anselm "de Chau" (Latin: nobilem mulierem Mariam relictam quondam nobilis viri Anselmi de Chau).

Such napolitan and some ragusan sources from the 1280s suggest that John's and Matilda′s daughter Maria had a sister (lat. soror), or at least a half-sister Helen, Queen of Serbia (d. 1314), thus allowing scholars to point out that John could be Helen's father too. If those assumptions are correct, John would be the maternal grandmother of Serbian kings Stefan Dragutin (d. 1316) and Stefan Milutin (d. 1321).

== Sources ==
- Angold, Michael (2011). "The Latin Empire of Constantinople, 1204–1261: Marriage Strategies". Identities and Allegiances in the Eastern Mediterranean after 1204. Farnham: Ashgate Publishing Limited. pp. 47–68. ISBN 9781409410980.
- Bácsatyai, Dániel (2017). "A 13. századi francia–magyar kapcsolatok néhány kérdése" (PDF). Századok. 151 (2): 237–278.
- Berger, Élie, ed. (1897). Les Registres d'Innocent IV. Vol. 3. Paris: Fontemoing.
- Bourel de la Roncière, Charles, ed. (1895). Les Registres d'Alexandre IV. Vol. 1. Paris: Thorin.
- Ćirković, Sima (2004). The Serbs. Malden: Blackwell Publishing. ISBN 9781405142915.
- Engel, Pál (2001). The Realm of St. Stephen: A History of Medieval Hungary, 895-1526. London & New York: I.B.Tauris. ISBN 9781850439776.
- Fine, John Van Antwerp Jr. (1975). The Bosnian Church: A New Interpretation: A Study of the Bosnian Church and Its Place in State and Society from the 13th to the 15th Centuries. Boulder: East European Quarterly. ISBN 9780914710035.
- Fine, John Van Antwerp Jr. (1994) [1987]. The Late Medieval Balkans: A Critical Survey from the Late Twelfth Century to the Ottoman Conquest. Ann Arbor, Michigan: University of Michigan Press. ISBN 0472082604.
- Kosztolnyik, Zoltán J. (1996). Hungary in the Thirteenth Century. Boulder: East European Monographs.
- McDaniel, Gordon L. (1984). "On Hungarian-Serbian Relations in the Thirteenth Century: John Angelos and Queen Jelena" (PDF). Ungarn-Jahrbuch. 12 (1982-1983) [1984]: 43–50.
- McDaniel, Gordon L. (1986). "The House of Anjou and Serbia". Louis the Great: King of Hungary and Poland. Boulder: East European Monographs. pp. 191–200. ISBN 9780880330879.
- Moravcsik, Gyula (1970). Byzantium and the Magyars. Budapest: Akadémiai Kiadó.
- Ostrogorsky, George (1956). History of the Byzantine State. Oxford: Basil Blackwell.
- Petrovitch, Nicolas (2015). "La reine de Serbie Hélène d'Anjou et la maison de Chaources". Crusades. 14: 167–182. doi:10.1080/28327861.2015.12220366. ISBN 9781472468413. S2CID 257002925.
- Porčić, Nebojša (2020). "Serbia in the registers of the Angevin chancery (1265-1295): An attempt at reconstruction". Initial: A Review of Medieval Studies. 8: 119–163.
- Porčić, Nebojša (2021). "Documents of Mary of Cayeux concerning grants to the Abbey of Dommartin and an agreement with the king of England". Initial: A Review of Medieval Studies. 9: 181–208.
- Szentpétery, Imre, ed. (1923). Az Árpád-házi királyok okleveleinek kritikai jegyzéke: Regesta regum stirpis Arpadianae critico-diplomatica (PDF). Vol. 1. Budapest: Magyar Tudományos Akadémia.
- Uzelac, Aleksandar (2025). "Patrimony of Queen Jelena (On the Background of Serbian-Hungarian Conflicts in the Thirteenth and Fourteenth Centuries)" (PDF). Црквене студије: Church Studies. 22: 303–315. Archived from the original on 2025-02-08.
- Van Tricht, Filip (2011). The Latin Renovatio of Byzantium: The Empire of Constantinople (1204–1228). Leiden-Boston: Brill.
- Van Tricht, Filip (2020). "Latin Emperors and Serbian Queens Anna and Helena: Genealogical and Geopolitical Explorations in the Post-1204 Byzantine World". Frankokratia. 1 (1–2): 56–107.
- Zsoldos, Attila (2005). Az Árpádok és asszonyaik: A királynéi intézmény az Árpádok korába. Budapest: MTA Történettudományi Intézete.
