= Matilda of Požega =

- Lady of Syrmia; Lady of Požega
- Born: c. 1210
- Died: after 1255
- Spouses: John Angelos of Syrmia
- Issue: Maria Angelina of Syrmia; Helen, Queen of Serbia (possible)
- House: House of Issoudun (by birth); House of Angelos (by marriage)
- Mother: Margaret of Courtenay

Matilda of Požega (born c. 1210 - died after 1255) was daughter of Margaret of Courtenay (d. 1270), princess of the Latin Empire of Constantinople, from her first marriage with Raoul III, Lord of Issoudun. Matilda was married (c. 1230) to John Angelos, Lord of Syrmia (d. before 1250) in the Kingdom of Hungary. After his death, she held the city of Požega in the medieval Požega County (c. 1250-1255).

== Parents ==
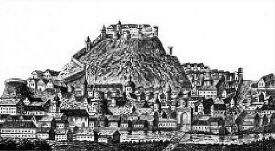
The city of Požega in the old Požega County (modern Slavonia)

Matilda's mother Margaret was daughter of Peter Courtenay (d. 1219), Latin Emperor of Constantinople, and his second wife Yolanda of Flanders. Margaret′s brothers, consequent Latin emperors Robert I (d. 1228) and Baldwin II (d. 1273), were Matilda′s maternal uncles.

Regarding her father, some earlier researches assumed that she was born from her mothers second marriage, with Henry I, Count of Vianden (d. 1252), but later scholars pointed out that Margaret's first husband Raoul III of Issoudun did mention their "little daughter" (lat. filiola) Matilda in his 1212 testament, and thus was shown that she was born from Margaret's first marriage.

== Marriage and descendants ==
Since Matilda's mother Margaret was sister to Yolanda, Queen of Hungary (d. 1233), a marriage was arranged (c. 1230) between Matilda and John Angelos, son of Yolanda's sister-in-law Margaret of Hungary from her first husband, Byzantine Emperor Isaac II Angelos (d. 1204). Matilda's husband John became Lord of Syrmia in the medieval Kingdom of Hungary, and after his death (before 1250), Matilda became the Lady of Požega in medieval Požega County (central region in modern Slavonia). Already in 1250, she was mentioned as "noble lady, widow of lord John, countess of Požega" (lat. nobilis domine relicte domini Johannis, comitisse de Posoga).

Their daughter Maria was married (c. 1253-1255) to Anselm de Cayeux, who later (before 1269) became camerlengo of the Latin Emperor Baldwin II of Constantinople, Matilda′s uncle. Various issues regarding the attribution of data related to two persons (father and son) who had the same name (Anselm de Cayeux), have been discussed in several genealogical studies, since some napolitan and ragusan sources from the 1280s suggest that Matilda′s daughter Maria had a sister (lat. soror), or at least a half-sister Helen, Queen of Serbia (d. 1314). If some of those assumptions are correct, Matilda would be Helen's mother too, and thus the maternal grandmother of Serbian kings Stefan Dragutin (d. 1316) and Stefan Milutin (d. 1321).

== Sources ==
- Angold, Michael (2011). "The Latin Empire of Constantinople, 1204–1261: Marriage Strategies". Identities and Allegiances in the Eastern Mediterranean after 1204. Farnham: Ashgate Publishing Limited. pp. 47–68. ISBN 9781409410980.
- Bácsatyai, Dániel (2017). "A 13. századi francia–magyar kapcsolatok néhány kérdése" (PDF). Századok. 151 (2): 237–278.
- Berger, Élie, ed. (1897). Les Registres d'Innocent IV. Vol. 3. Paris: Fontemoing.
- Bourel de la Roncière, Charles, ed. (1895). Les Registres d'Alexandre IV. Vol. 1. Paris: Thorin.
- Geanakoplos, Deno John (1953). "Greco-Latin Relations on the Eve of the Byzantine Restoration: The Battle of Pelagonia–1259". Dumbarton Oaks Papers. 7: 99–141. doi:10.2307/1291057. JSTOR 1291057.
- Mazzoleni, Jole, ed. (1967) [1952]. I registri della Cancelleria Angioina (PDF). Vol. 4 (2nd ed.). Napoli: Accademia Pontaniana.
- McDaniel, Gordon L. (1984). "On Hungarian-Serbian Relations in the Thirteenth Century: John Angelos and Queen Jelena" (PDF). Ungarn-Jahrbuch. 12 (1982-1983) [1984]: 43–50.
- McDaniel, Gordon L. (1986). "The House of Anjou and Serbia". Louis the Great: King of Hungary and Poland. Boulder: East European Monographs. pp. 191–200. ISBN 9780880330879.
- Moravcsik, Gyula (1970). Byzantium and the Magyars. Budapest: Akadémiai Kiadó.
- Petrovitch, Nicolas (2015). "La reine de Serbie Hélène d'Anjou et la maison de Chaources". Crusades. 14: 167–182. doi:10.1080/28327861.2015.12220366. ISBN 9781472468413. S2CID 257002925.
- Porčić, Nebojša (2020). "Serbia in the registers of the Angevin chancery (1265-1295): An attempt at reconstruction". Initial: A Review of Medieval Studies. 8: 119–163.
- Porčić, Nebojša (2021). "Documents of Mary of Cayeux concerning grants to the Abbey of Dommartin and an agreement with the king of England". Initial: A Review of Medieval Studies. 9: 181–208.
- Szentpétery, Imre, ed. (1923). Az Árpád-házi királyok okleveleinek kritikai jegyzéke: Regesta regum stirpis Arpadianae critico-diplomatica (PDF). Vol. 1. Budapest: Magyar Tudományos Akadémia.
- Van Tricht, Filip (2011). The Latin Renovatio of Byzantium: The Empire of Constantinople (1204–1228). Leiden-Boston: Brill.
- Van Tricht, Filip (2020). "Latin Emperors and Serbian Queens Anna and Helena: Genealogical and Geopolitical Explorations in the Post-1204 Byzantine World". Frankokratia. 1 (1–2): 56–107.
- Zsoldos, Attila (2005). Az Árpádok és asszonyaik: A királynéi intézmény az Árpádok korába. Budapest: MTA Történettudományi Intézete.
