= Yolanda of Courtenay =

Queen consort of Hungary
- Tenure: 1215–1233
- Coronation: 1215
- Born: c. 1200
- Died: June 1233
- Spouse: Andrew II of Hungary
- Issue: Yolanda, Queen of Aragon
- House: Courtenay
- Father: Peter II of Courtenay
- Mother: Yolanda of Flanders

Yolanda of Courtenay (c. 1200 – June 1233), was a queen of Hungary as the second wife of King Andrew II of Hungary.

Yolanda was the daughter of Count Peter II of Courtenay and his second wife, Yolanda of Flanders, the sister of Baldwin I and Henry I, the emperors of Constantinople. Her marriage with King Andrew II, whose first wife, Gertrude had been murdered by conspirators on 28 September 1213, was arranged by her uncle, the Emperor Henry I.

Their marriage was celebrated in February 1215 in Székesfehérvár and John, Archbishop of Esztergom crowned her queen consort. However, Bishop Robert of Veszprém sent a complaint to Pope Innocent III, because the coronation of the queens consort in Hungary had been traditionally the privilege of his see. The Pope sent a legate to Hungary in order to investigate the complaint and confirmed the privilege of the See of Veszprém.

Following her uncle's death on 11 July 1216, her husband was planning to acquire the imperial crown for himself, but the barons of the Latin Empire proclaimed her father emperor, instead.

During her time as queen she appears to have had some level of power. For instance, she received several letters from the Pope, Honorius III, and at some points granted land to citizens.

Yolanda maintained good relations with her husband's children from his first marriage. Her husband survived her. She was buried in the Egres Abbey of the White Monks.

Queen Yolanda was instrumental (c. 1230) in arranging the marriage between Matilda (daughter of her sister Margaret of Courtenay), and John Angelos (son of Yolanda's sister-in-law Margaret of Hungary).

== Marriages and children ==
By her marriage with Andrew II of Hungary (c. 1177 – 21 September 1235) she had:

- Yolanda (c. 1215 – 12 October 1251), wife of King James I of Aragon

== Sources ==
- Engel, Pál (2001). The Realm of St. Stephen: A History of Medieval Hungary, 895-1526. London & New York: I.B.Tauris. ISBN 978-1-85043-977-6.
- Kosztolnyik, Zoltán J. (1996). Hungary in the Thirteenth Century. Boulder: East European Monographs. ISBN 978-0-88033-336-8.
- McDaniel, Gordon L. (1984). "On Hungarian-Serbian Relations in the Thirteenth Century: John Angelos and Queen Jelena" (PDF). Ungarn-Jahrbuch. 12 (1982-1983) [1984]: 43–50.
- McDaniel, Gordon L. (1986). "The House of Anjou and Serbia". Louis the Great: King of Hungary and Poland. Boulder: East European Monographs. pp. 191–200. ISBN 978-0-88033-087-9.
- Van Tricht, Filip (2020). "Latin Emperors and Serbian Queens Anna and Helena: Genealogical and Geopolitical Explorations in the Post-1204 Byzantine World". Frankokratia. 1 (1–2): 56–107. doi:10.1163/25895931-12340002.
- Zsoldos, Attila (2005). Az Árpádok és asszonyaik: A királynéi intézmény az Árpádok korába. Budapest: MTA Történettudományi Intézete. ISBN 978-963-8312-98-3.

Yolanda of Courtenay Capetian dynasty Born: c. 1200 Died: 1233
Royal titles
Preceded by Gertrude of Merania	Queen consort of Hungary; 1215–1233	Succeeded by Beatrice d'Este
