= Mary of Hungary (disambiguation) =

Mary, Queen of Hungary was the reigning queen of Hungary, 1382–95.

Mary of Hungary or Maria of Hungary may also refer to:

- Margaret of Hungary (Byzantine empress) or Empress Maria (1175–1223)
- Mary of Hungary, Queen of Naples (1257–1323), Queen Consort of Naples
- Mary of Hungary (governor of the Netherlands) (1505–1558), wife of Louis II of Hungary and queen consort of Bohemia and Hungary; later, the governor of the Habsburg Netherlands
