= William IV of Saint Omer =

William IV of Saint Omer (fl. 1157 – 1191) was the castellan of Saint-Omer from ca. 1171 until his death, as well as Lord of Beaurain and Fauquembergues.

The date of his birth is unknown; he is mentioned for the first time in 1157, when his uncle Walter was castellan. William was the son of Walter's successor, William III of Saint Omer, and of a lady named Mathilda. William IV is first attested as castellan in 1178, but according to Arthur Giry he may have succeeded his father already by 1171, as the genealogies of Baldwin of Avesnes imply that he was already castellan when married his wife, Ida of Avesnes (a sister of the Crusader James of Avesnes), and the couple's eldest son, the future William V of Saint Omer, was already over 15 years old in 1186. William is attested in a series of documents and charters until 9 August 1190, but it appears that he then left for the Holy Land, where he died in 1191.

His wife, Ida of Avesnes, lived until sometime between 1205 and May 1211. According to Baldwin of Avesnes, the couple had eleven children:

- William V of Saint Omer (ca. 1171 – ca. 1246), castellan of Saint Omer, married Imagina of Looz
- Walter of Saint Omer, killed in 1219 during the Fifth Crusade
- James of Saint Omer, married firstly Clemence of Dammartin and secondly Elisabeth, widow of the Prince of Achaea Geoffrey I of Villehardouin
- William VI of Saint Omer (died ca. 1247/51), castellan of Saint Omer
- Nicholas I of Saint Omer, married Margaret of Hungary, the widow of Boniface of Montferrat
- Mathilda of Saint Omer, married Arnold IV, advocatus of Thérouanne
- Beatrice of Saint Omer, lady of Saint Omer, married Philip of Aire
- Ida of Saint Omer, married Gerard III, provost of Douai
- Agnes of Saint Omer, abbess of Mesen
- Alice of Saint Omer, married firstly Baldwin II of Créquy and secondly Anselm IV of Cayeu
- Margaret of Saint Omer, married Baldwin III of Créquy

== Sources ==
- Giry, Arthur (1874). "Les châtelains de Saint-Omer (1042-1386) (premier article)". Bibliothèque de l'école des chartes (in French). 35: 325–355. doi:10.3406/bec.1874.446568.
