= Vendegies =

Vendegies may refer to:

== Places ==
- Vendegies-sur-Écaillon, a commune in the Nord Department in northern France.
- Vendegies-au-Bois, a commune in the Nord Department in northern France.
