= Gradac (Raška) =

- Village (Selo)
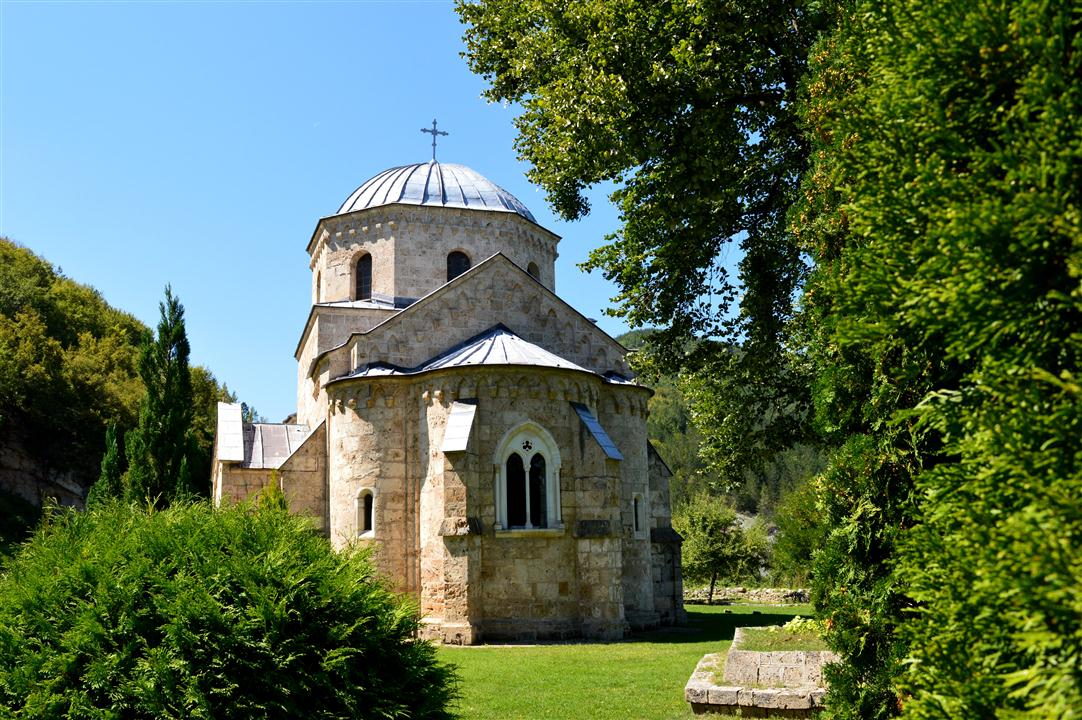

- Location within Serbia
- Coordinates: 43°22′N 20°32′E
- Country: Serbia
- District: Raška District
- Municipality: Raška

Population (2002)
  - Total: 368
- Time zone: UTC+1 (CET)
  - Summer (DST): UTC+2 (CEST)

Gradac is a village in the municipality of Raška, Serbia. According to the 2002 census, the village has a population of 368 people.

Gradac Monastery is located in the village, at the edge of forested slopes of Golija. It was founded in the late 13th century by Helen of Anjou, and is protected as a Monument of Culture of Exceptional Importance.
