= Henry I of Vianden =

Count of Vianden (c. 1200–1252)

Henry I

Count of Vianden
- Reign: 1220–1252

Marquis of Namur jure uxoris
- Reign: 1229–1237
- Born: c. 1190/1210
- Died: 1252
- Spouse: Margaret, Marchioness of Namur
- Issue: Philip I Henry I van Vianden; Yolanda of Vianden; Frederic of Vianden; Peter
- House: House of Sponheim/Vianden
- Father: Frederic III, Count of Vianden
- Mother: Mechthild (Mathilde) of Neuerburg

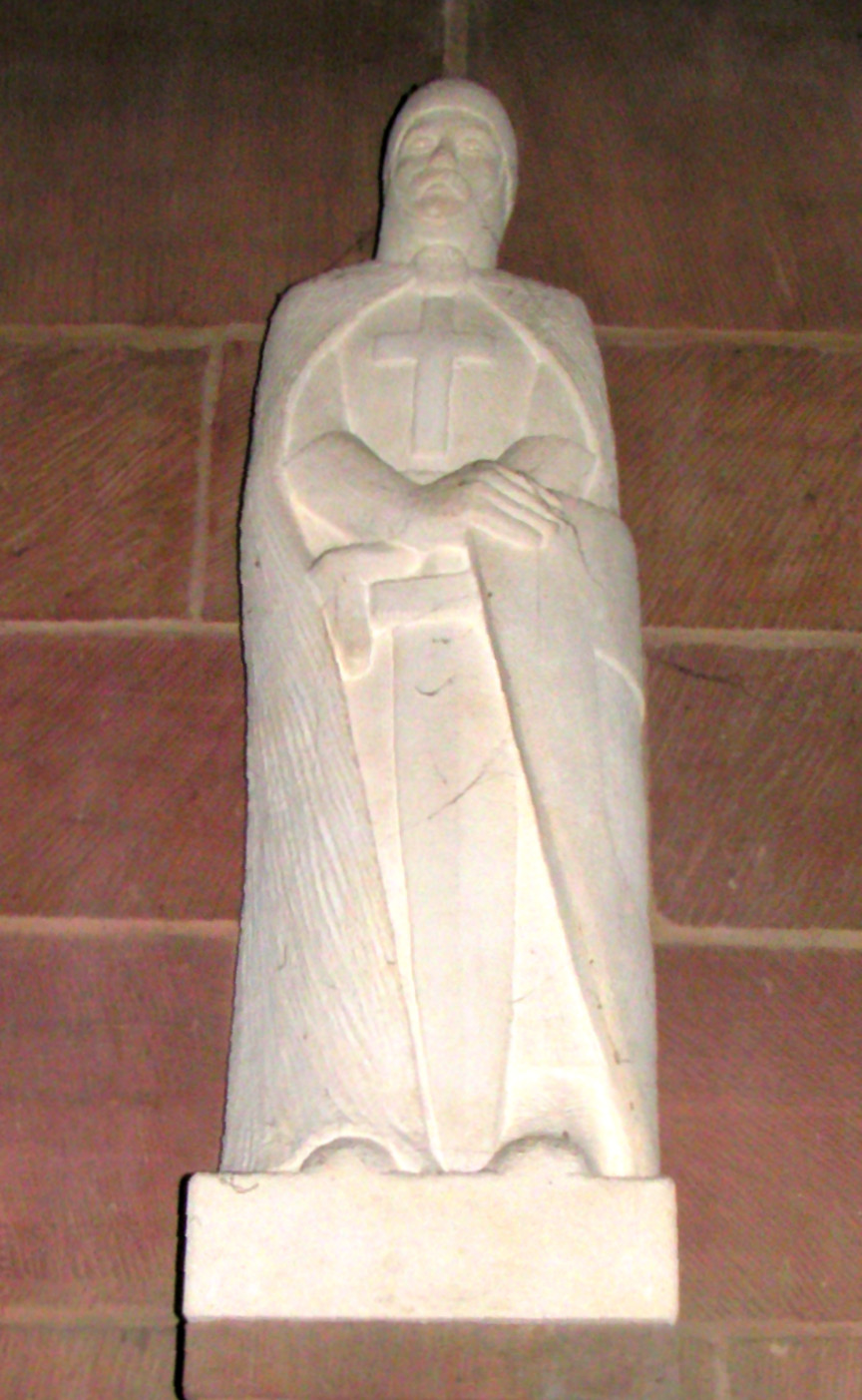
Heinrich I. Burg Vianden.JPG

Henry I (c.1200–1252) was the hereditary Count of Vianden in the Holy Roman Empire, from 1210 and, through his wife, Marquis of Namur from 1229.

== Family background ==
Henry was the son of Count Frederic III of Vianden (de) (c. 1160 - 1210), and Mechthild (Mathilde) of Neuerburg (?), (b.c. 1130/1170 - c. 1200). At least his father married a Mechtild and another son, Frederick I, younger brother of Henry, inherited Neuerburg and married Cecilia of Isenburg, but that dynasty became extinct with the death of Frederick III of Neuerburg in 1332 (de).

== Life ==
In 1216 Henry married Margaret, Marchioness of Namur, sometimes called "Sibilia" (c. 1194 - 17 July 1270), daughter of Peter II of Courtenay and Yolanda of Flanders. Margaret was the widow of Raoul III, lord of Issoudun and thence Lady of Châteauneuf-sur-Cher and Mareuil-en-Berry.

Margaret became Marchioness of Namur after the death of her brother Henry II, Marquis of Namur in 1229. Margaret and Henry ruled Namur (apparently as Henry III of Namur) until 1237 when they had to transfer Namur to Margaret's brother, emperor Baldwin II of Courtenay. Henry and Margaret continued ruling Vianden.

Henry V, Count of Luxembourg (1216 – 1281), maternal grandson of Henry IV, Count of Luxembourg (Henry I of Namur), invaded Namur and ruled it 1256-1264 as Henry IV (or III). Baldwin sold Namur in c. 1263 to his cousin Guy of Dampierre, count of Flanders and Henry IV was removed by military force but they made peace with family marriage.

After Henry's death in 1252, Margaret entered a convent in Marienthal.

== Issue ==
Some earlier researches believed that Margaret's daughter Matilda was born from her second marriage, with Henry I of Vianden, but later scholars pointed out that Margaret's first husband Raoul III of Issoudun, in his 1212 testament, mentioned their "little daughter" (lat. filiola) Matilda, thus concluding that she was born from Margaret's first marriage. Henry's stepdaughter Matilda was later (c. 1230) married to John Angelos (b. c. 1193 - d. before 1250), Lord of Syrmia. Matilda and John had a daughter Maria (c. 1235 - a. 1285) whose husband Anselm (Anseau) de Cayeux (the younger) worked for King Charles I of Naples. Since Maria is mentioned, in some 1280s sources, as sister (lat. soror) of Queen Helen of Serbia (c. 1236–1314), some researchers have proposed that Helen was also a daughter of Matilda, and thus grand-daughter of Henry's wife Margaret.

Henry and Margaret had the following children:

- Peter, dean in cathedrals of Liège and Cologne (died after 1272)
- Frederic of Vianden. Frederic died in 1247 (5 years before his father). He married Mathilde of Salm (b.c. 1223), a daughter of Henry III, Count of Ardennes (seigneur de Viviers, c. 1190 - 1246 ?, married to Marguerite de Bar le Duc ?), and had a son named Henry, Lord of Schönecken (1248-1299) (de).
- Henry I van Vianden (d. 1267), bishop of Utrecht from 1249 to 1267.
- Philip I (d. 1273), Count of Vianden 1252-1273. He married Marie of Brabant-Perwez, daughter of Godfrey of Louvain, Lord of Perwez, apparently a descendant of Godfrey III, Count of Louvain and Landgrave of Brabant (1142-1190). Their issue was Godefroid I, Count of Vianden (d. 1307 or 1310) and four other children.
- Yolanda of Vianden (1231–1283), still revered today in Luxembourg.

== See also ==
- Counts of Vianden

== Sources ==
- Abbott, Paul D. (1981). Provinces, pays, and seigneuries of France. Myrtleford, Australia. ISBN 978-0-9593773-0-9.
- Devailly, Guy (1973). Le Berry du Xe siècle au milieu du XIIIe: Étude politique, religieuse, sociale, et économique. Paris: École pratique des hautes études en sciences sociales; Mouton. ISBN 978-2-307-62543-8.
- Lawson, Richard H., ed. (1995). Brother Hermann's Life of the Countess Yolanda of Vianden. Columbia, SC: Camden House. ISBN 978-1-57113-050-1.
- McDaniel, Gordon L. (1984). "On Hungarian-Serbian Relations in the Thirteenth Century: John Angelos and Queen Jelena" (PDF). Ungarn-Jahrbuch. 12 (1982-1983) [1984]: 43–50.
- McDaniel, Gordon L. (1986). "The House of Anjou and Serbia". Louis the Great: King of Hungary and Poland. Boulder: East European Monographs. pp. 191–200. ISBN 9780880330879.
- Van Houts, Elisabeth (2014). "Yolanda of Vianden (1231-1283): A Reluctant Bride" (PDF). Quaestiones Medii Aevi Novae. 19: 127–143. Archived from the original on 2024-05-29.
- Van Tricht, Filip (2011). The Latin Renovatio of Byzantium: The Empire of Constantinople (1204–1228). Leiden-Boston: Brill. ISBN 978-90-04-20323-5.
- Van Tricht, Filip (2020). "Latin Emperors and Serbian Queens Anna and Helena: Genealogical and Geopolitical Explorations in the Post-1204 Byzantine World". Frankokratia. 1 (1–2): 56–107. doi:10.1163/25895931-12340002.

Preceded by Henry II of Namur	Marquis of Namur jure uxoris 1229–1237	Succeeded by Baldwin II of Courtenay
Preceded by Frederic III	Counts of Vianden; 1220–1252	Succeeded by Philip I
