= Eudokia Laskarina Angelina =

Princess of Nicaea

Eudokia Laskarina
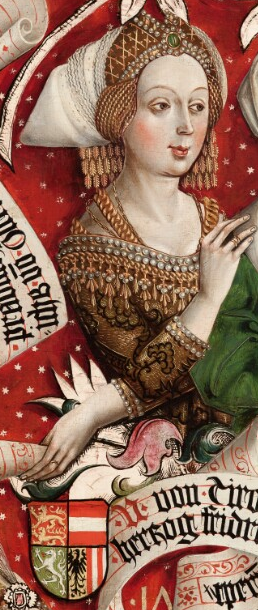
- Eudokia Laskarina Angelina painted by Ladislaus Sunthaym between 1489 and 1492
- Born: between 1210 and 1212
- Died: after 1247
- Spouse: Frederick II, Duke of Austria; Anseau de Cayeux
- House: Laskaris
- Father: Theodore I Komnenos Laskaris
- Mother: Anna Komnene Angelina

Eudokia Laskarina Angelina (Greek: Ευδοκία Λασκαρίνα Αγγελίνα, romanized: Evdokía Laskarina Angelina; 1210/1212 – after 1247) was a Byzantine princess. She was a younger daughter of Emperor Theodore I Komnenos Laskaris of Nicaea and Anna Komnene Angelina.

== Life ==
She was engaged to Robert I, Latin Emperor in 1221, but the marriage was blocked by the Patriarch of Constantinople Manuel I. Her first marriage was with Frederick II, Duke of Austria. They would divorce, and before 1230 she would marry again, to Anseau de Cayeux, later regent of the Latin Empire (1237–1238).

In 1247, Anseau assigned to her custody of the city of Tzurulon in the hope that it would not be attacked by John III Doukas Vatatzes, who was married to Eudokia's sister Irene Laskarina.

Her name was Eudokia, but in one western source, related to her Austrian marriage, she is mentioned as Sophia.

== Sources ==
- Angold, Michael (2011). "The Latin Empire of Constantinople, 1204–1261: Marriage Strategies". Identities and Allegiances in the Eastern Mediterranean after 1204. Farnham: Ashgate Publishing Limited. pp. 47–68. ISBN 9781409410980.
- Ostrogorsky, George (1956). History of the Byzantine State. Oxford: Basil Blackwell.
- Perry, Guy (2013). John of Brienne: King of Jerusalem, Emperor of Constantinople, c. 1175–1237. Cambridge: Cambridge University Press. ISBN 9781107043107.
