= Agnes of Antioch =

12th-century queen consort of Hungary

Anna of Antioch
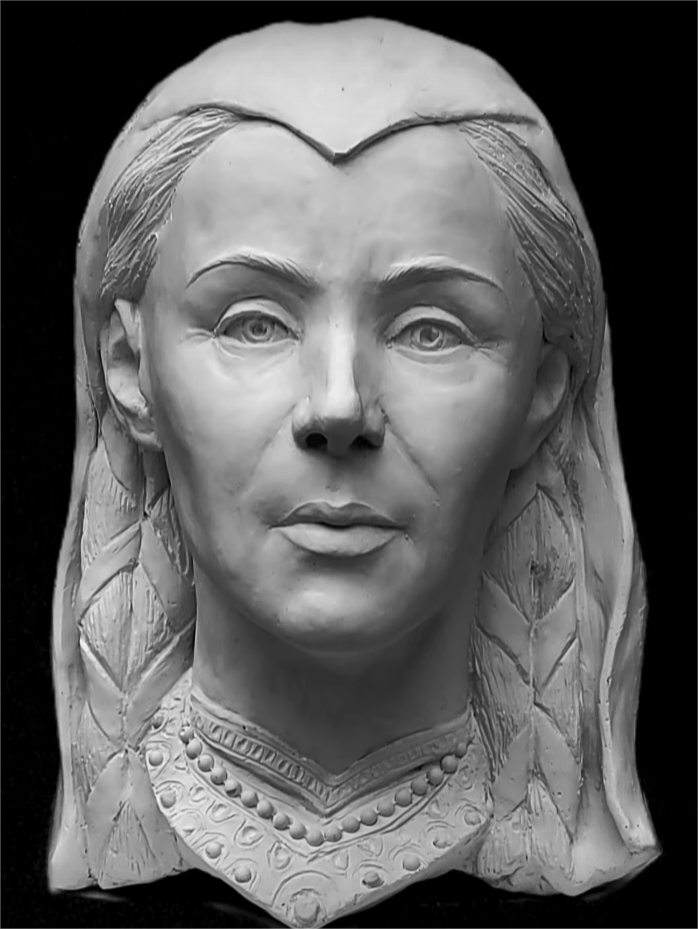
- Archaeological reconstruction of the skull of Agnes of Antioch

Queen consort of Hungary
- Tenure: 4 March 1172 – c. 1184
- Coronation: 13 January 1173
- Born: c. 1154
- Died: c. 1184
- Burial: Székesfehérvár Basilica reburied at Matthias Church
- Spouse: Béla III of Hungary
- Issue: Emeric, King of Hungary; Byzantine Empress Margaret; Andrew II, King of Hungary; Constance, Queen of Bohemia
- House: House of Châtillon
- Father: Raynald of Châtillon
- Mother: Constance, Princess of Antioch

Anna of Antioch (c. 1154 – c. 1184), also known as Agnes of Antioch and Anna de Châtillon, was Queen of Hungary from 1172 until 1184 as the first wife of Béla III.

The accidental discovery of her intact tomb during the Hungarian Revolution of 1848 provided an opportunity for patriotic demonstrations. She was the only 12th-century Hungarian queen whose remains were studied by scientists, and her appearance was reconstructed.

== Life ==
She was the daughter of Raynald of Châtillon and Constance, Princess of Antioch.

The exact date of her birth is uncertain. It is assumed that she was born soon after the secret marriage of her parents, which took place before May 1153. The most common belief in historiography was that Agnes was born in 1154. At the baptism she probably received the name of Agnes.

=== Early life and marriage ===
Her father was captured by the Muslims in November 1160 and was confined in Aleppo for the next fifteen years. Agnes's mother Princess Constance died c. 1163/67, and around 1170 Agnes went to Constantinople, where her older half-sister, Maria of Antioch, had been living as the wife of the Byzantine Emperor Manuel I Comnenus. On the Emperor's request, Agnes was married to Caesar Alexios (born prince Béla of Hungary), who had been engaged to the Emperor's daughter, Maria Comnena, until the birth of Manuel's son, Alexios, in 1166. The wedding date of Agnes and Alexios is unknown; is believed that may have occurred about 1168 and no later than 1172. In historiography, there are two precise dates for the wedding: September 1169 and March 1171.

She received the name Anna in the imperial court. In the Hungarian documents she always appeared with her new name, probably because Agnes was an uncommon name at that time.

=== Queen of Hungary ===
The new couple went on a pilgrimage to Jerusalem where they made a donation for the Knights Hospitaller. In the summer, after the death of King Stephen III of Hungary (4 March 1172), her husband ascended the throne as King Béla III, and they moved to Hungary. Anna was crowned queen alongside her husband at the Cathedral Basilica of Saint Stephen in Székesfehérvár on 13 January 1173.

The spread of French cultural patterns in the Kingdom of Hungary is attributed to Anna/Agnes.

The queen's activities were also connected with the presence in Hungary of the first Cistercian monks, who came from Burgundy. Anna could keep in touch with Burgundian Cistercians through ancestral linkages. The first Cistercian monastery in Hungary, founded in 1182, was in fact closely associated with three Cistercian abbeys located near Pontigny and the surrounding estates belonged to the Donzy family, from which Anna descended.

=== Issue ===
During her marriage, Anna gave birth to at least six children:

- King Emeric of Hungary (1174 – 30 September/November 1204).
- Margaret (1175 – after 1223), wife firstly of Emperor Isaac II Angelos, secondly of King Boniface I of Thessalonica and thirdly of Nicholas I of Saint-Omer.
- King Andrew II of Hungary (c. 1177 – 21 September 1235).
- Salomon (died young).
- Stephen (died young).
- Constance (c. 1180 – 6 December 1240), wife of king Ottokar I of Bohemia.

Anna was the ancestress of all subsequent kings of Hungary, as well as the Hungarian princesses, and by marriage of the Piast duchesses St. Kinga and Bl. Jolenta of Poland. In addition, from her descended the kings of Bohemia from the Přemyslid, Luxembourg, Jagiellon and Habsburg families.

=== Death ===
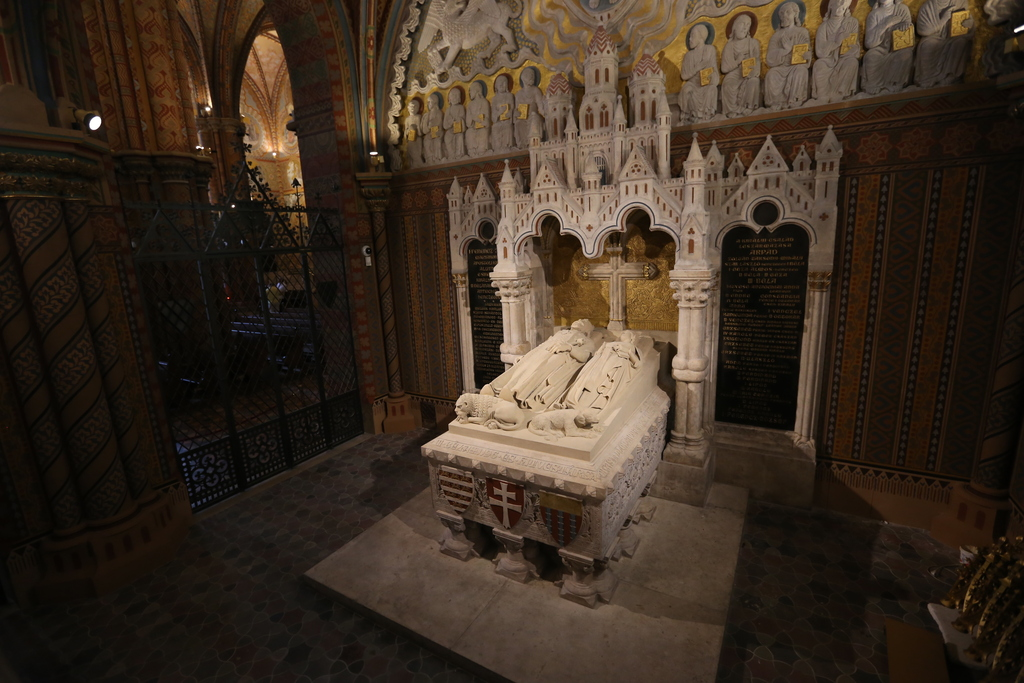
Tomb of Agnes and her husband, Béla III of Hungary (Matthias Church, Budapest)

Anna's death date was not recorded in any contemporary source, but it is assumed that she died in the year 1184, although it is possible she died a little earlier than that.

== Influence ==
Bathing and public baths were important in Komnenos-era Constantinople that she and her husband both grew up in. Anna introduced the practice of public bathing to Hungary, having been also raised in Antioch, when at least four bathhouses were operating in the city. The earliest known bath in medieval Hungary is a foundation that was laid by her.

== Burial ==
Anna was buried at Cathedral Basilica of Saint Stephen in Székesfehérvár. Her remains were confidently identified by archeologists during late-19th-century excavations at the ruined cathedral of Székesfehérvár. Her remains were afterwards reinterred at the Mathias Church in Budapest, with those of her husband.

== Sources ==
- Korai Magyar Történeti Lexikon (9-14. század), főszerkesztő: Kristó Gyula, szerkesztők: Engel Pál és Makk Ferenc (Akadémiai Kiadó, Budapest, 1994)
- Wihoda, Martin (2015). Vladislaus Henry: The Formation of Moravian Identity. BRILL. ISBN 978-9004303836.

Royal titles
Vacant Title last held by Maria Komnene	Queen consort of Hungary; 1172 – c. 1184	Vacant Title next held by Margaret of France
