= William V of Saint-Omer =

William V of Saint Omer (ca. 1171 – ca. 1246) was the castellan of Saint-Omer from 1192 until his death, as well as Lord of Beaurain and Fauquembergues.

Born in ca. 1171, he was the eldest son of William IV of Saint Omer and Ida of Avesnes. He is attested in charters issued by his father from 1185 on, and some time between 1190 and 1192 he succeeded his father, who had died in the Holy Land. He is attested in numerous charters and deeds of property as well as donation to the Church over the next decades. He repeatedly pledged his loyalty to King Philip Augustus during the latter's conflicts with his neighbours, and is occasionally mentioned among the Flemish feudatories of the French court. He married Imagina of Looz, daughter of Gerard II, Count of Looz.

The marriage was childless, and after his death (sometime between March 1246 and August 1247) he was succeeded by his sole surviving brother, William VI of Saint Omer.

== Sources ==
- Giry, Arthur (1874). "Les châtelains de Saint-Omer (1042-1386) (premier article)". Bibliothèque de l'école des chartes (in French). 35: 325–355. doi:10.3406/bec.1874.446568.
- Giry, Arthur (1875). "Les châtelains de Saint-Omer (1042-1386) (deuxième article)". Bibliothèque de l'école des chartes (in French). 36: 91–117. doi:10.3406/bec.1875.446625.
