= Beaucourt =

- Commune
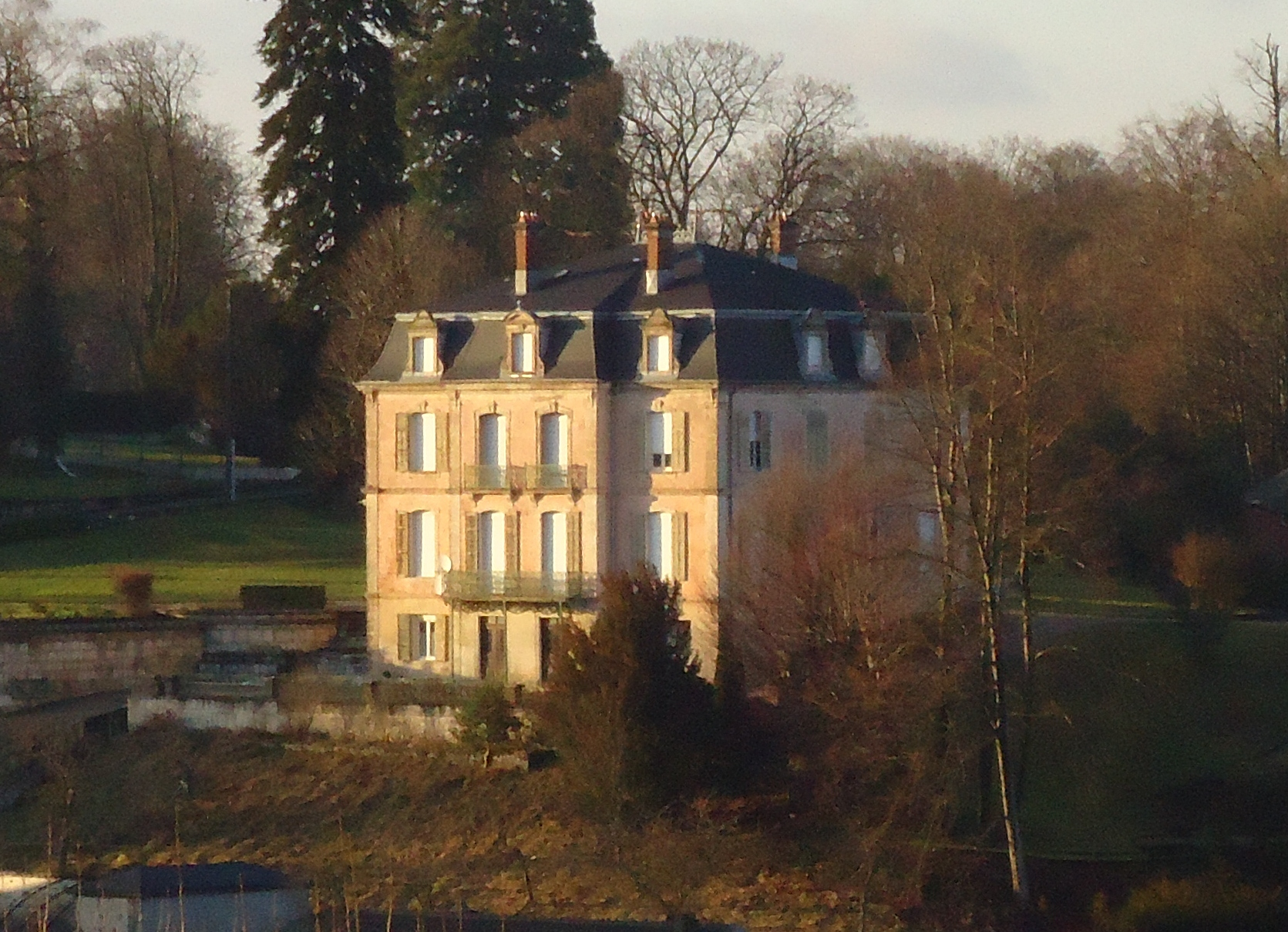
- Château Albert Japy

- Coat of arms
- Location of Beaucourt
- Location within France Location within Bourgogne-Franche-Comté
- Coordinates: 47°29′12″N 6°55′34″E
- Country: France
- Region: Bourgogne-Franche-Comté
- Department: Territoire de Belfort
- Arrondissement: Belfort
- Canton: Delle
- Intercommunality: Sud Territoire

Government
  - Mayor (2020–2026): Thomas Biétry
- Area^{1}: 4.95 km^{2} (1.91 sq mi)
- Highest elevation: 575 m (1,886 ft)
- Lowest elevation: 375 m (1,230 ft)
- Population (2023): 4,966
  - Density: 1,000/km^{2} (2,600/sq mi)
- Time zone: UTC+01:00 (CET)
  - Summer (DST): UTC+02:00 (CEST)
- INSEE/Postal code: 90009 /90500
- ^{1} French Land Register data, which excludes lakes, ponds, glaciers > 1 km^{2} (0.386 sq mi or 247 acres) and river estuaries.

Beaucourt (French pronunciation: [bokuʁ]) is a commune in the Territoire de Belfort department in Bourgogne-Franche-Comté in northeastern France. The archivist and palaeographer Élie Berger (1850–1925) was born in Beaucourt.

== Population ==
Historical population
Year	Pop.	±% p.a.
1968	4,924	—
1975	5,521	+1.65%
1982	5,682	+0.41%
1990	5,569	−0.25%
1999	5,348	−0.45%
2007	5,013	−0.81%
2012	5,153	+0.55%
2017	5,007	−0.57%
2023	4,966	−0.14%
Source: INSEE

== Literature ==
Beaucourt Revisited is a war poem by A.P. Herbert.

== See also ==
- Communes of the Territoire de Belfort department
