= Gradac Monastery =

Monastery in Serbia

Coordinates: 43°22′08″N 20°32′52″E

Gradac monastery Манастир Градац
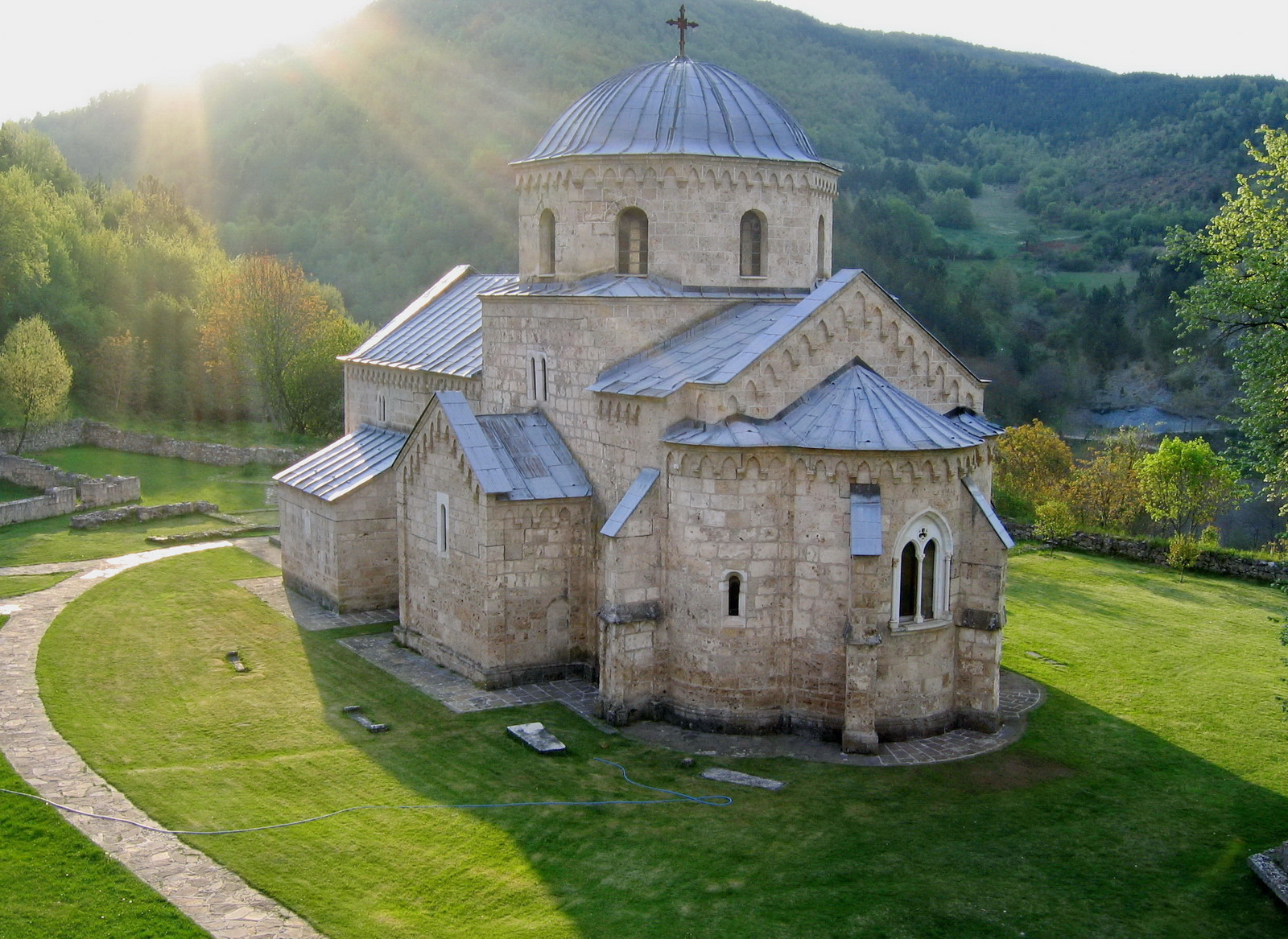
- Gradac
- Interactive map of Gradac monastery Манастир Градац

Monastery information
- Full name: Манастир Градац
- Order: Serbian Orthodox
- Established: 1277–1282
- Dedication: The Entry of the Most Holy Theotokos into the Temple

People
- Founder: Helen of Anjou

Site
- Location: Gradac, Serbia
- Public access: Yes

The Gradac Monastery (Serbian: Манастир Градац / Manastir Gradac, pronounced [ɡrǎːdats]) is a Serbian Orthodox Monastery. It lies on the elevated plateau above the river Gradačka, at the edge of the forested slopes Golija. It is an endowment of queen Helen which was built from 1277 to 1282 during the reign of her son king Stefan Dragutin. Gradac Monastery was declared a Monument of Culture of Exceptional Importance in 1979, and it is protected by the state.

== History ==
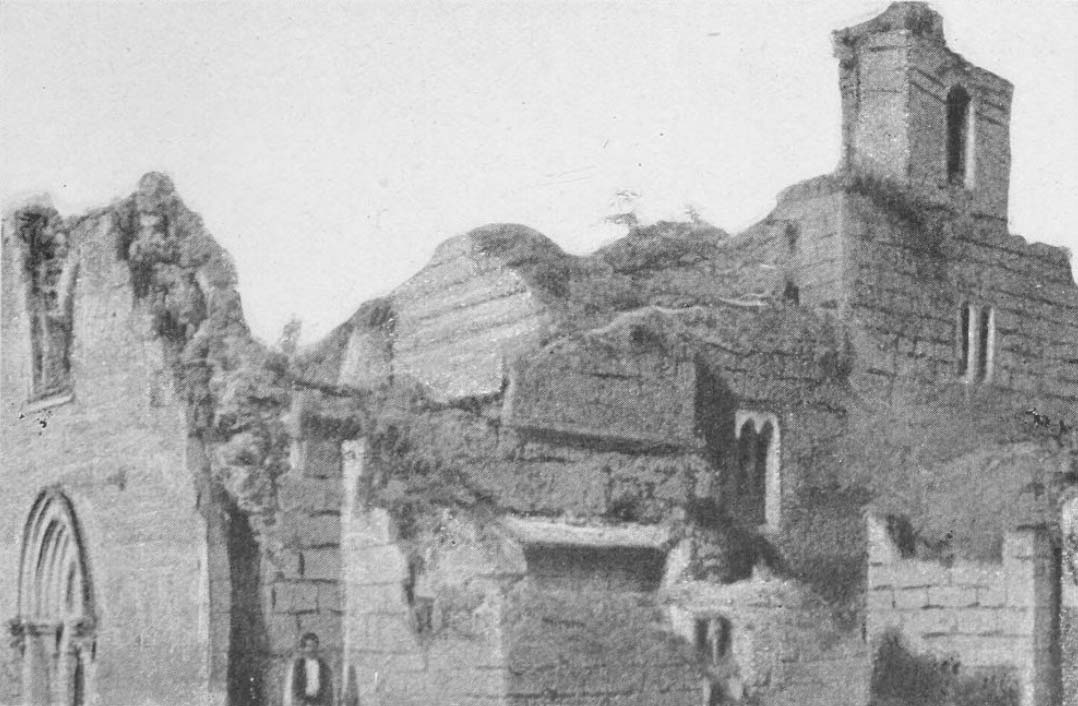
Monastery in ruins, 1917

The monastery was built from 1277 to 1282 and is an endowment of Helen of Anjou, the wife of king Uroš I. The monastery is situated in Stara Raška region, on the wooded and secluded slopes of Golija mountain on the place called by locals Petrov Krš. It is located west of the medieval fortress Brvenik. The monastery complex was included the large building Church of The Entry of the Most Holy Theotokos into the Temple, the smaller temple St. Nicholas, a dining room, quarters and the economic building. The monastery church is a single-nave structure with a dome, a tripartite altar and a rectangle choir, whose central part consists of two chapels, the main naos and the altar. In the architecture of the shrine of Gradac Monastery, an example of monumental Serbian-Byzantine style of Raška school of architecture, there are numerous Gothic and Romanesque elements, especially on the portals and on all bifocals, windows divided by a colonnette into two arches. The architectural plastic of the Gradac Monastery carries the properties of the mature and late Romanesque art, like some early Gothic, all being reflected primarily in the finishing of the portal capitol, mostly marble framed windows and a series of blind arcades of the roof corona.

The monastery was devastated at the end of the 14th century. It was partially restored at the end of the 16th century. However, it was finally deserted in the 17th century when the monks, fleeing from the Turks, left somewhere unknown, taking with them the Holy Relics of its founder. In the next 300 years, both churches and the monastery buildings caved in. During the Ottoman rule, the monastery was generally with no monks and no roof cover, that was removed from the church. In 1910, a protective roof was placed on a monastery church, and between 1963 and 1975 a complete reconstruction of the main church was performed by the Institute of the Protection of Cultural monuments of Serbia conducted extensive restoration works on the main Church of the Entry of the Most Holy Theotokos into the Temple and the Chapel of St Nicholas. The fresco decoration of the interior is considerably damaged, but the endower's composition is still visible and the original iconostasis is preserved in primary edition. In 1982, construction of living quarters began and the monastery was revived again, then abbot was shijarhimandrit Julian Knežević (1918–2001). Today, the monastery is a nunnery.

== Gallery ==
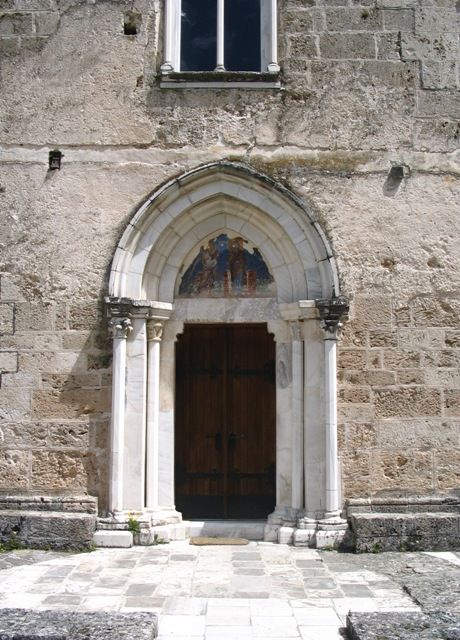

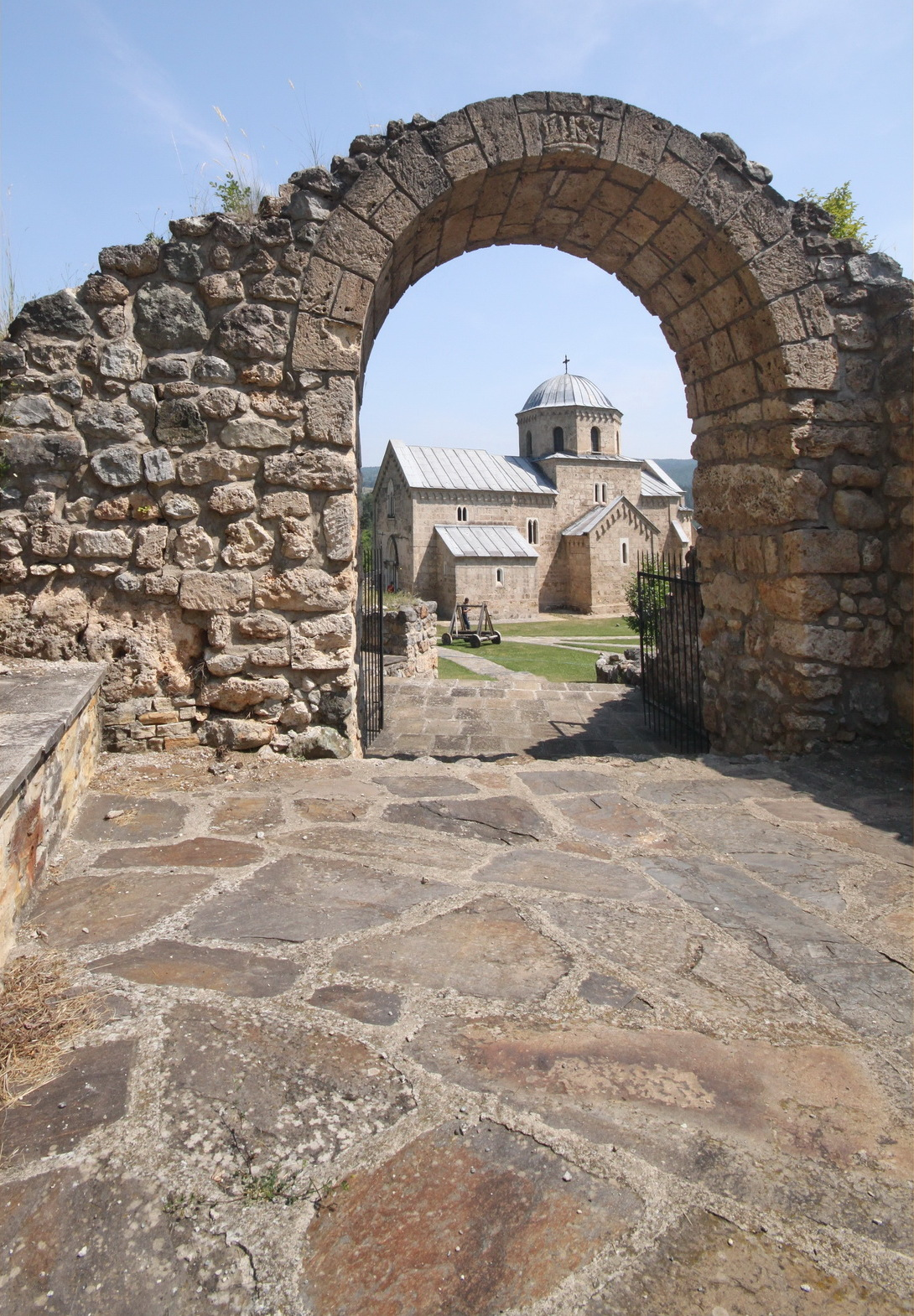

== See also ==
- List of Serbian Orthodox monasteries
