= Nieurlet =

Nieurlet Nieuwerleet
- Commune
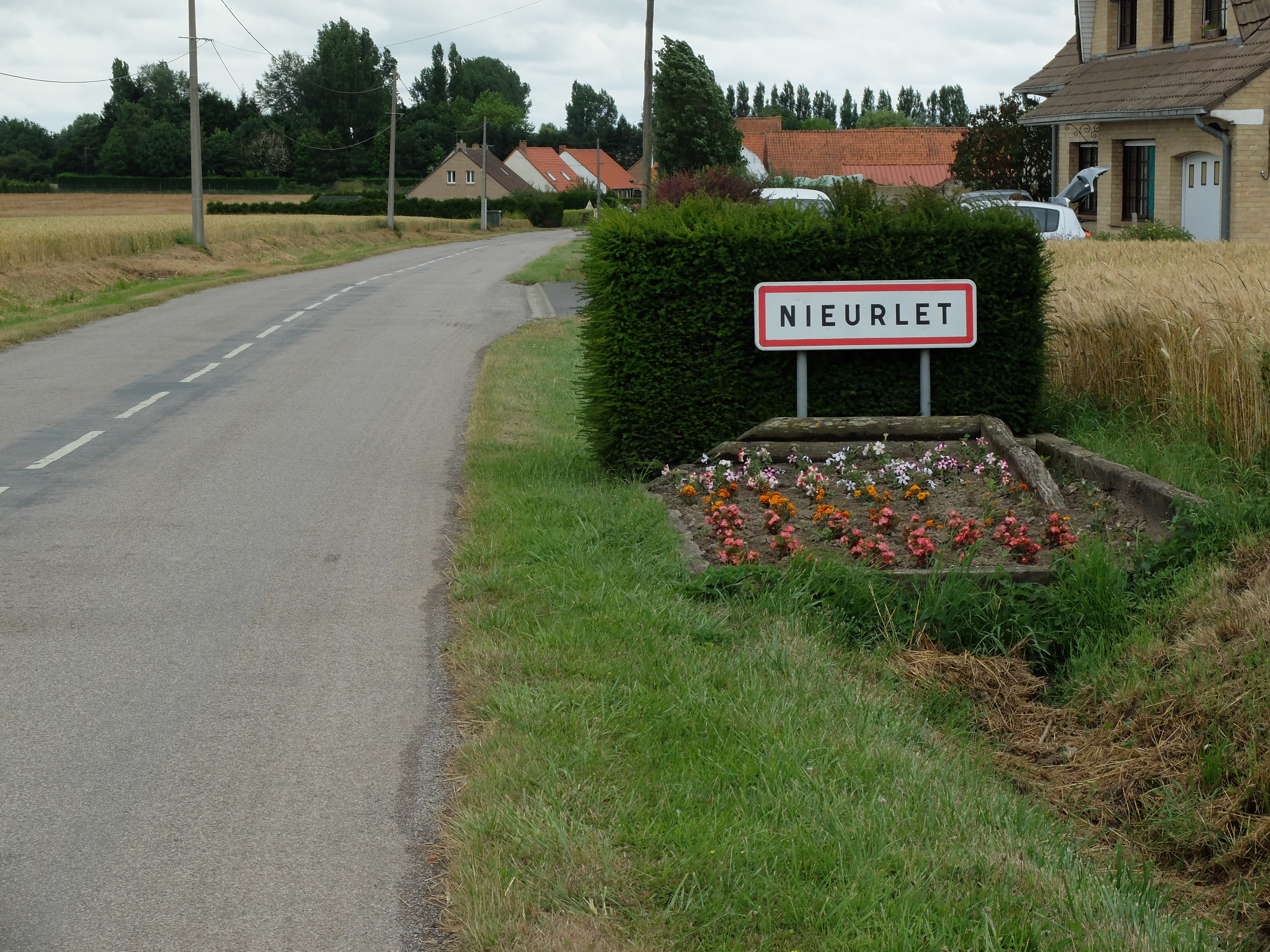
- The road into Nieurlet

- Coat of arms
- Location of Nieurlet
- Location within France Location within Hauts-de-France
- Coordinates: 50°47′24″N 2°16′59″E
- Country: France
- Region: Hauts-de-France
- Department: Nord
- Arrondissement: Dunkerque
- Canton: Wormhout
- Intercommunality: CC Hauts de Flandre

Government
  - Mayor (2020–2026): Régis Verbeke
- Area^{1}: 10.25 km^{2} (3.96 sq mi)
- Elevation: 13 m (43 ft)
- Highest elevation: 28 m (92 ft)
- Lowest elevation: 0 m (0 ft)
- Population (2023): 908
  - Density: 88.6/km^{2} (229/sq mi)
- Demonym: Nieurletois
- Time zone: UTC+01:00 (CET)
  - Summer (DST): UTC+02:00 (CEST)
- INSEE/Postal code: 59433 /59143
- ^{1} French Land Register data, which excludes lakes, ponds, glaciers > 1 km^{2} (0.386 sq mi or 247 acres) and river estuaries.

Nieurlet (French pronunciation: [njœʁlɛ]; from Flemish; Nieuwerleet in modern Dutch spelling) is a commune in the Nord department in northern France.

== Heraldry ==
| Arms of Nieurlet | The arms of Nieurlet are blazoned : Vairy Or and azure. (Beaurain, Nieurlet and Vendegies-au-Bois use the same arms.) |

== See also ==
- Communes of the Nord department
