= Saint Helen of Serbia =

Queen consort of Serbia (c. 1235–1314)

Saint Saint Helen of Serbia Света Јелена Српска Sveta Jelena Srpska
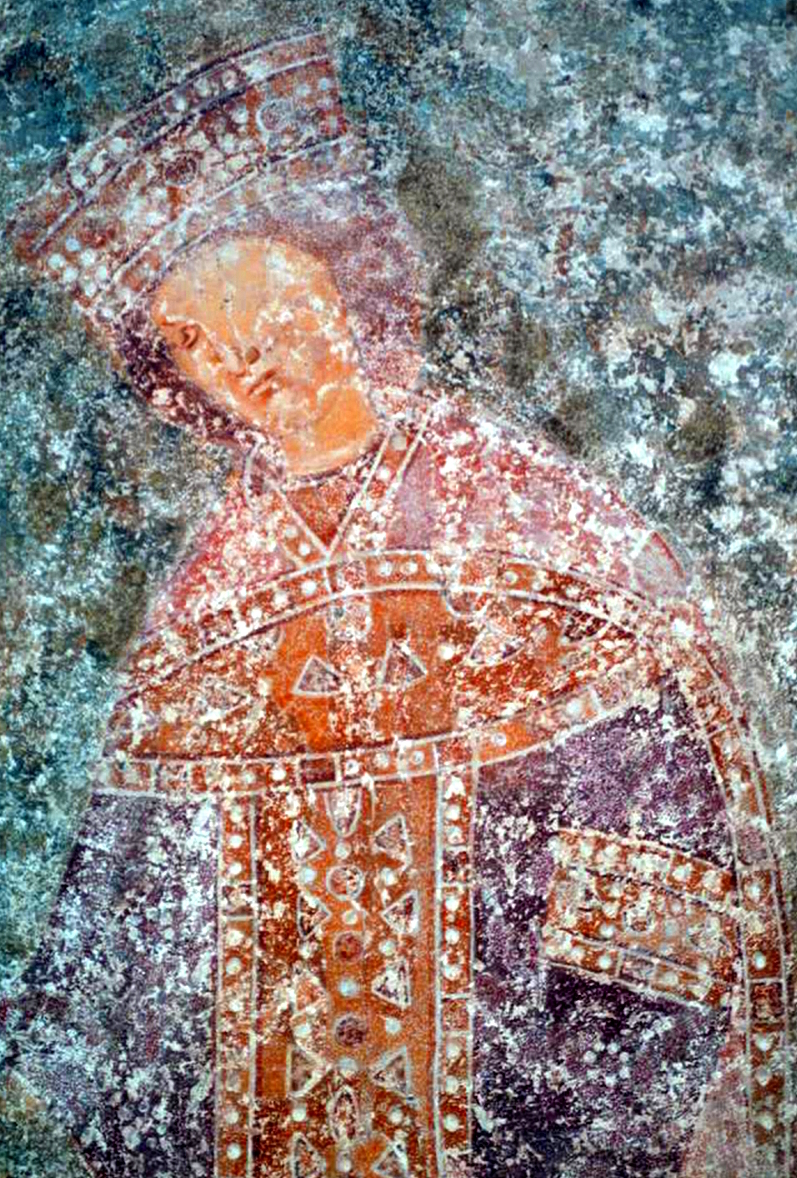
- Fresco of Queen Helen of Serbia in Sopoćani Monastery

Church Builder
- Venerated in: Eastern Orthodox Church
- Attributes: Church Builder

Queen consort of Serbia
- Tenure: 1243–1276
- Born: c. 1235
- Died: 8 February 1314 (aged c. 78); Church of St. Nicholas, Skadar
- Burial: Gradac Monastery
- Spouse: Stefan Uroš I
- Issue: Stefan Dragutin; Stefan Milutin; Stefan; Brnjača
- Religion: Roman Catholic, then Serbian Orthodox
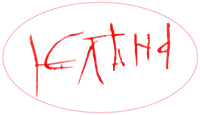
- Signature

Saint Helen of Serbia (Serbian: Света Јелена Српска, romanized: Sveta Jelena Srpska; c. 1235 – 8 February 1314) was the queen consort of the Serbian Kingdom, as the spouse of King Stefan Uroš I, who ruled from 1243 to 1276. Their sons were later Serbian kings Stefan Dragutin and Stefan Milutin. As a dowager-queen, she held the provincial governorship in the regions of Zeta and Travunija (until 1308). She built Gradac Monastery and was known for her religious tolerance. She is venerated as a saint by the Eastern Orthodox Church. Her relics, however, are now lost.

== Life ==
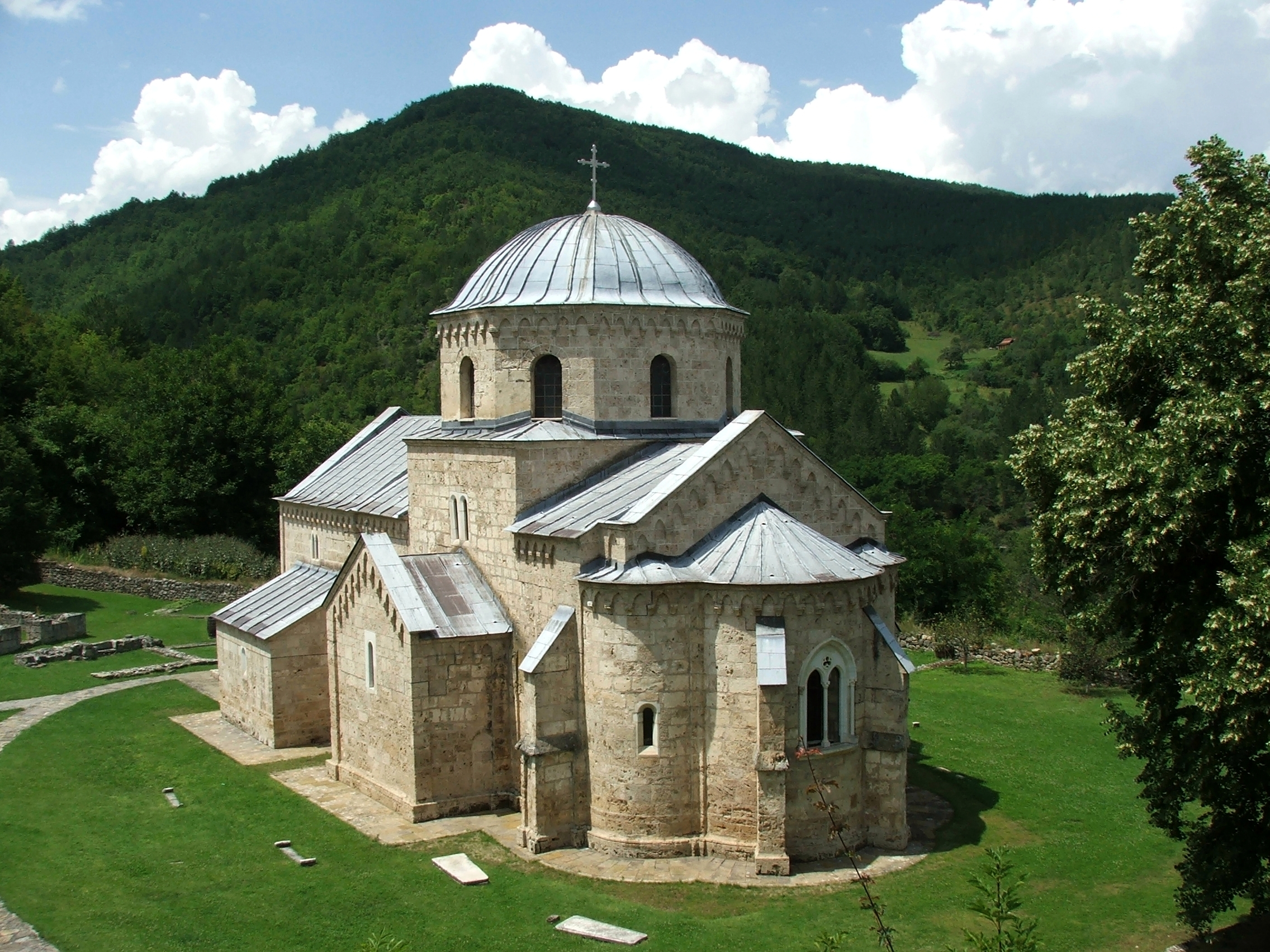
Gradac Monastery was founded by Queen Helen.

=== Origin ===
Helena's origin is not known for certain. Her hagiography, written by Serbian Archbishop Danilo II, states only that she "was of a French family" (Serbian: бысть оть племене фpoужьскaаго), while in hagiography of her husband, King Stefan Uroš I, the same statement was repeated, but it was also added that she was "from the imperial family".

By the beginning of the 20th century, several genealogical theories on her origin were proposed, based mainly on examination of historical data related to Helena's sister, or half-sister Maria and her family.

One of those theories advocated that Helena was of Angevine origin. That theory was based on free interpretation of some sources from the 1280s and 1290s, showing that Angevine kings of Naples referred to Queen Helen of Serbia as dear cousin. Based on that, some researchers started to advocate Helena's direct origin from the House of Anjou, coining the term "Helen of Anjou" (Serbian Cyrillic: Јелена Анжујска, Jelena Anžujska). Despite a lack of supporting sources, the term became more popular during the 1920s and 1930s. It was promoted not only by journalists and publicists, but also by some scholars. Stating that Helen was of French origin, John Fine assumed that she was "probably of the Valois family".

Several scholars have pointed out that some Neapolitan and Ragusan sources from the 1280s refer to Maria of Cayeux as sister (Latin: soror), or at least a half-sister of Queen Helen of Serbia, thus focusing their efforts on discovering key details on Maria's ancestry. Gordon McDaniel proposed that Maria's husband Anselm of Cayeux, the Captain General in Albania (1273–1274) for Charles I of Naples, was the same Anselm who was mentioned in 1253–1255 as husband of Maria, daughter of John Angelos of Syrmia (d. before 1250) and Matilda of Požega (d. after 1255). According to McDaniel, Maria and Helen were full sisters, by both parents, and thus both descended, through their father John, from a side branch of the Byzantine imperial House of Angelos, and the Hungarian royal House of Árpád.

A key napolitan document that points to the sisterhood between Maria and Helen was issued in the summer of 1280, by king Charles I of Sicily, who allowed lady Maria to travel from Apulia to Serbia, to visit her sister, the queen of Serbia (Latin: Quia nobilis mulier domina Maria de Chaurs cum filio suo et familia eiusdem domine intendit transfretare ad presens ad partes Servie visura dominam reginam Servie sororem suam). In later documents, issued in 1281, Maria was mentioned by king Charles as his cousin (Latin: nobilis mulier Maria domina Chau consanguinea nostra carissima), and widow of Anselm of Cayeux, who was son or grandson of the elder Anselm de Cayeux (Latin: nobilem mulierem Mariam relictam quondam nobilis viri Anselmi de Chau).

Parents of Maria of Cayeux are known from her marriage licenses, issued from 1253 to 1255 by the papal chancellery. The first mentions the marriage "inter Anselmum de Keu ac Mariam, natam Matildis dominae de Posaga, natae comitissae Viennensis", while the second mentions "Maria, nate quondam Calojohanni" and also mentions Matilda's maternal uncle as "imperatore Constantinopolitano, eiusdem Matildis avunculo". Those data allowed McDaniel to identify Maria's father as John Angelos, and Maria's mother as Matilda, daughter of Margaret Courtenay (sister of the Latin emperors Robert I and Baldwin II).

Several scholars have accepted McDaniel's conclusion that Maria of Cayeux and Helen of Serbia were sisters, or at least half sisters, thus also accepting his approach to complicated questions on Queen Helen's ancestry, and by proxy to other genealogical questions, related to their ancestors and cousins from various families (Angelos, Courtenay, Cayeux).

=== Queen of Serbia ===
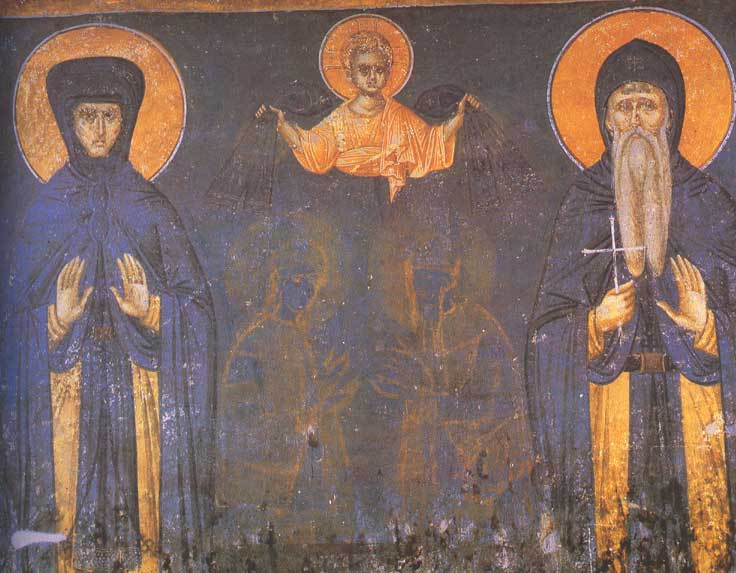
Queen Helena and her son, King Stefan Milutin

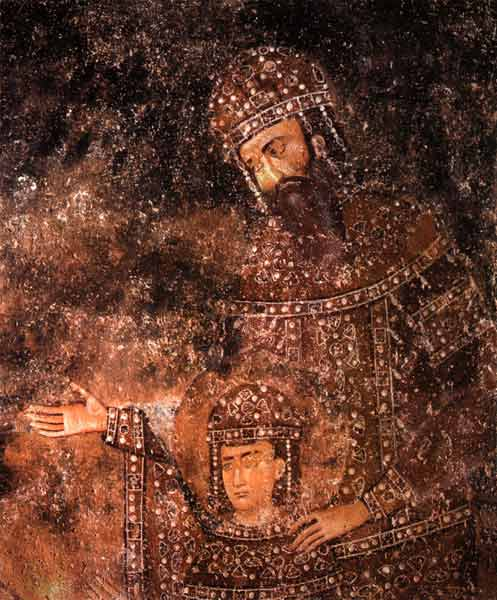
Helen's husband, King Stefan Uroš I, with their eldest son, Dragutin. 13th-century fresco in the Sopoćani monastery

Helen married King Stefan Uroš I of Serbia, around 1245–1250. In 1276, conflict broke out between her husband and their eldest son Stefan Dragutin. King Uroš abdicated, and later died in 1280. During the reign of her sons Stefan Dragutin (1276–1282) and Stefan Milutin (1282–1321), dowager-queen Helen held provincial administration in the regions of Zeta and Travunia, until 1308. She proved to be a successful administrator, governing regions with mixed Serbian Orthodox and Roman Catholic population.

Soon after that, she became a nun at the Church of St. Nicholas in Skadar, where she died on 8 February 1314. She was canonized by the Serbian Orthodox Church. Her feast day is 12 November [O.S. 30 October]. With frescos from Serbian Orthodox Gračanica Monastery Queen Helen significantly contributed to the cultural rise of the medieval Serbian state. She had a library at her court and encouraged transcription of books in monasteries. She founded the first girls' school in medieval Serbia. One of Helen's palaces was in the town of Brnjak (sometimes called "Brnjaci") in the territory of modern Kosovo. She also possessed the town of Jeleč at Rogozna mountain. As did other members of the Nemanjić dynasty, she built monasteries and donated to churches. She built the Gradac Monastery, where she was buried, the Church of St. Nicholas in Skadar where she died, and renewed the Monastery of Saints Sergius and Bacchus. She had repaired and rebuilt many churches and monasteries around Lake Skadar that had been devastated by the Mongol invasion of 1242.

== Issue ==
Queen Helen and her husband, King Stefan Uroš I, had at least three children, two sons and one daughter:

- Stefan Dragutin, Serbian king 1276–1282
- Stefan Milutin, Serbian king 1282–1321
- Brnjača, became a nun

== See also ==
- Nemanjić dynasty
- Kingdom of Serbia (medieval)
- Zeta (crown land)

== Sources ==
- Angold, Michael (2011). "The Latin Empire of Constantinople, 1204–1261: Marriage Strategies". Identities and Allegiances in the Eastern Mediterranean after 1204. Farnham: Ashgate Publishing Limited. pp. 47–68. ISBN 9781409410980.
- Bácsatyai, Dániel (2017). "A 13. századi francia–magyar kapcsolatok néhány kérdése" (PDF). Századok. 151 (2): 237–278.
- Bataković, Dušan T., ed. (2005). Histoire du peuple serbe [History of the Serbian People] (in French). Lausanne: L’Age d’Homme. ISBN 9782825119587.
- Berger, Élie, ed. (1897). Les Registres d'Innocent IV. Vol. 3. Paris: Fontemoing.
- Bourel de la Roncière, Charles, ed. (1895). Les Registres d'Alexandre IV. Vol. 1. Paris: Thorin.
- Ćirković, Sima (2004). The Serbs. Malden: Blackwell Publishing. ISBN 9781405142915.
- Даничић, Ђура, ed. (1866). Животи краљева и архиепископа српских [Lives of Serbian Kings and Archbishops] (in Serbian). Загреб.
- Fine, John Van Antwerp Jr. (1994) [1987]. The Late Medieval Balkans: A Critical Survey from the Late Twelfth Century to the Ottoman Conquest. Ann Arbor, Michigan: University of Michigan Press. ISBN 0472082604.
- Ivić, Pavle, ed. (1995). The History of Serbian Culture. Edgware: Porthill Publishers. ISBN 9781870732314.
- Jireček, Constantin (1911). Geschichte der Serben. Vol. 1. Gotha: Perthes.
- Jireček, Constantin (1918). Geschichte der Serben. Vol. 2. Gotha: Perthes.
- Mazzoleni, Jole, ed. (1967) [1952]. I registri della Cancelleria Angioina (PDF). Vol. 4 (2nd ed.). Napoli: Accademia Pontaniana.
- Мијатовић, Чедомиљ (1903). "Ко је краљица Јелена?". Летопис Матице српске. 217: 1–30.
- McDaniel, Gordon L. (1984). "On Hungarian-Serbian Relations in the Thirteenth Century: John Angelos and Queen Jelena" (PDF). Ungarn-Jahrbuch. 12 (1982-1983) [1984]: 43–50.
- McDaniel, Gordon L. (1986). "The House of Anjou and Serbia". Louis the Great: King of Hungary and Poland. Boulder: East European Monographs. pp. 191–200. ISBN 9780880330879.
- Nicol, Donald M. (1993) [1972]. The Last Centuries of Byzantium, 1261-1453. Cambridge: Cambridge University Press. ISBN 9780521439916.
- Petrovitch, Nicolas (2015). "La reine de Serbie Hélène d'Anjou et la maison de Chaources". Crusades. 14 (1): 167–182. doi:10.1080/28327861.2015.12220366. ISBN 9781472468413. S2CID 257002925.
- Porčić, Nebojša (2020). "Serbia in the registers of the Angevin chancery (1265-1295): An attempt at reconstruction". Initial: A Review of Medieval Studies. 8: 119–163.
- Porčić, Nebojša (2021). "Documents of Mary of Cayeux concerning grants to the Abbey of Dommartin and an agreement with the king of England". Initial: A Review of Medieval Studies. 9: 181–208.
- Samardžić, Radovan; Duškov, Milan, eds. (1993). Serbs in European Civilization. Belgrade: Nova, Serbian Academy of Sciences and Arts, Institute for Balkan Studies. ISBN 9788675830153.
- Uzelac, Aleksandar (2025). "Patrimony of Queen Jelena (On the Background of Serbian-Hungarian Conflicts in the Thirteenth and Fourteenth Centuries)" (PDF). Црквене студије: Church Studies. 22: 303–315. doi:10.18485/ccs_cs.2025.22.22.16. Archived from the original on 8 February 2025.
- Van Tricht, Filip (2011). The Latin Renovatio of Byzantium: The Empire of Constantinople (1204–1228). Leiden-Boston: Brill. ISBN 978-90-04-20323-5.
- Van Tricht, Filip (2020). "Latin Emperors and Serbian Queens Anna and Helena: Genealogical and Geopolitical Explorations in the Post-1204 Byzantine World". Frankokratia. 1 (1–2): 56–107. doi:10.1163/25895931-12340002.
- Веселиновић, Милојко (1909). "Српске калуђерице". Глас Српске краљевске академије. 80: 155–256.
- Živković, Vojislav (2021). Serbian Kings Dragutin and Milutin. The Problem of the Succession of the Serbian Throne at the End of the 13th and Beginning of the 14th Century. Niš & Vranje: Centar za crkvene studije; Svepravoslavno društvo Prepodobni Justin Ćelijski i Vranjski. ISBN 978-86-84105-59-4.

Royal titles
Preceded by Beloslava of Bulgaria	Queen consort of Serbia c. 1245–1276	Succeeded by Catherine of Hungary
