= Margaret of Hungary (Byzantine empress) =

Byzantine empress (1185–1195, 1203–1204); Queen of Thessalonica (1205–1207)

Empress consort of the Byzantine Empire
- Tenure: 1185–1195
- Tenure: 1203–1204

Queen consort of Thessalonica
- Tenure: 1205–1207
- Born: 1175
- Died: after 1229
- Spouse: Isaac II Angelos; Boniface I of Montferrat; Nicholas of Saint Omer
- Issue: Manuel Angelos; John Angelos; Demetrius of Montferrat; Bela of Saint Omer; William of Saint Omer
- House: House of Árpád
- Father: Béla III of Hungary
- Mother: Agnes of Antioch

Margaret of Hungary (Margit in Hungarian; Μαργαρίτα in Greek; b. 1175 – d. after 1229) was a Hungarian princess from the House of Árpád. She was a Byzantine Empress by marriage to Isaac II Angelos (d. 1204), and Queen of Thessalonica by marriage to Boniface I of Montferrat (d. 1207). She was regent of Thessalonica during the minority of her son Demetrius of Montferrat, from 1207 to 1216. In later years (c. 1223) she governed some of the most southern regions of the Kingdom of Hungary, with her domains being centered in the region of Syrmia.

== Early life ==
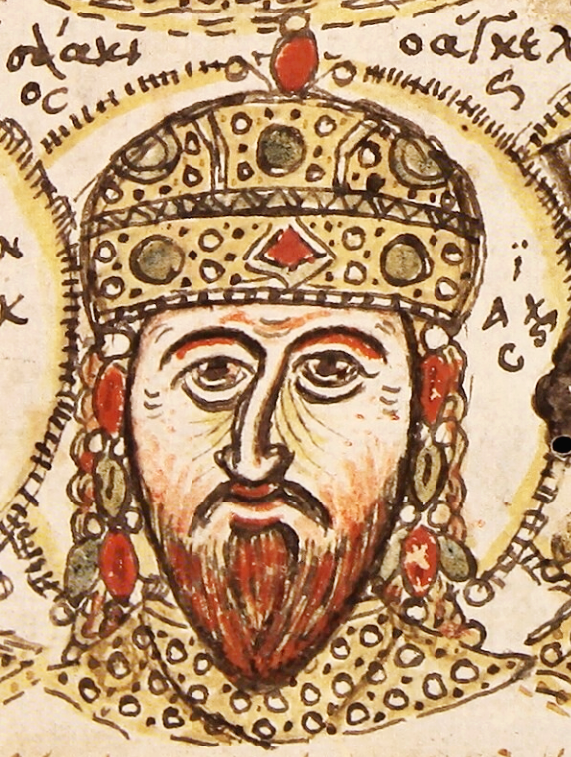
Margaret's first husband, the Byzantine Emperor Isaac II Angelos

Margaret was the eldest daughter of Béla III of Hungary and his first wife Agnes of Antioch. She was a younger sister of Emeric, King of Hungary. Her younger siblings were Andrew II of Hungary and Constance of Hungary. Two other siblings, Solomon and Stephen, are mentioned in the standard reference work on the genealogy of medieval European aristocracy, "Europäische Stammtafeln" (1978–1995) by Detlev Schwennicke. They reportedly died young.

== Empress ==
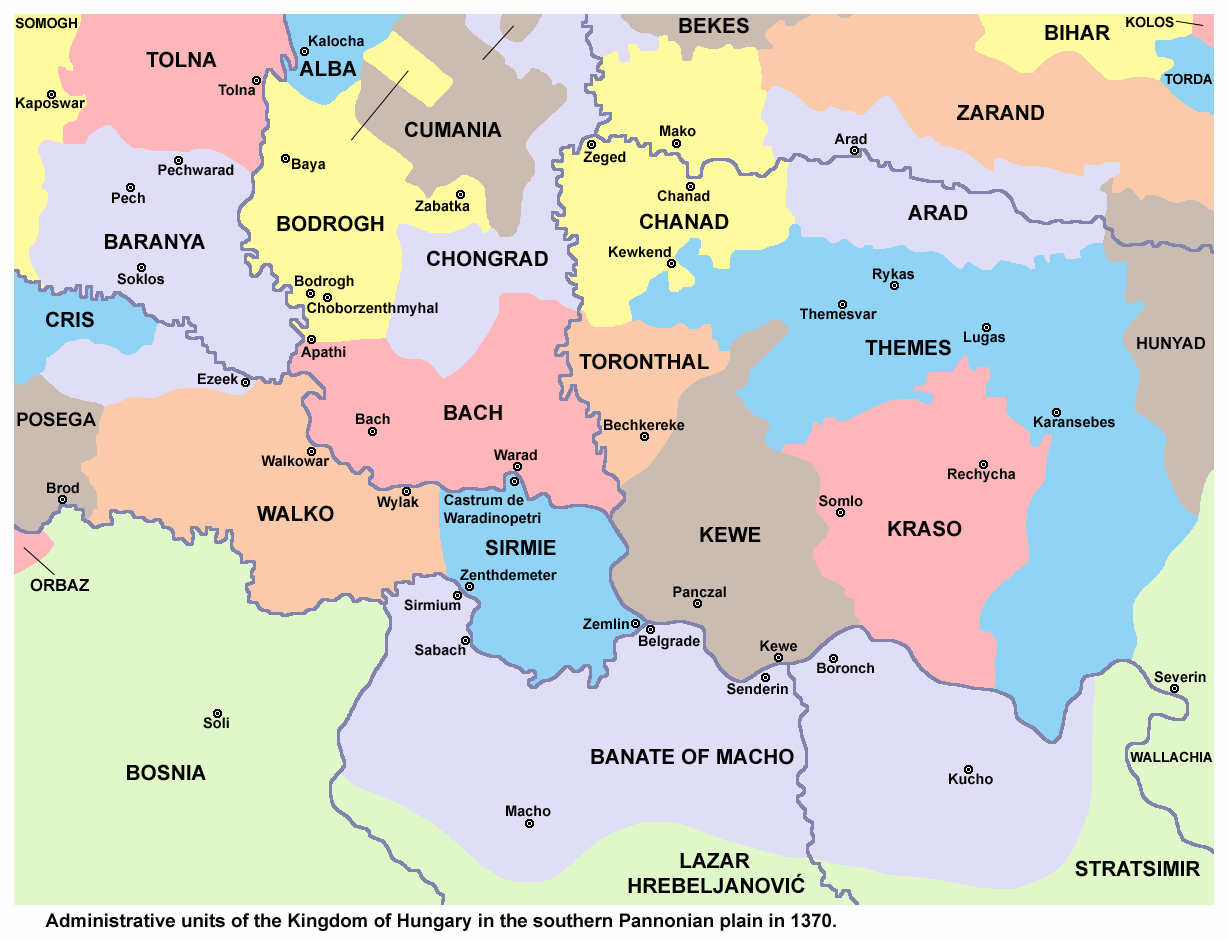
Administrative units in the southern regions of the Kingdom of Hungary, with Syrmia in the center (blue)

In January 1186, ten year old Margaret married the Byzantine Emperor Isaac II Angelos, who wanted a politically strategic alliance with Hungary in order to strengthen his claim to the throne and due to the changing policy towards dynastic marriages with foreign rulers. Upon this marriage, Margaret took the baptismal name "Maria" and was brought up following Byzantine customs.

With Isaac, she had two sons:

- Manuel Angelos (died 1212), he was evidently the elder son, being contemplated in 1205 to ascend the Byzantine throne
- John Angelos (b. ca. 1193 – died c. 1253). He migrated to Hungary and ruled over Syrmia and Kovin counties (c. 1227–1242) as a vassal of King Béla IV of Hungary.

Isaac had been deposed and blinded in 1195 by his brother Alexios III Angelos who then assumed the throne. Isaac was imprisoned, but it's not yet clear if Margaret was also. Her step-son Alexios IV Angelos had escaped and went to join the military discussions which were shortly to launch the Fourth Crusade. There, he and others convinced the Crusaders to besiege Constantinople in order to depose his uncle and restore his imprisoned father and himself to the throne. This was done, but his restored reign was short-lived, as the Crusaders took over the empire for themselves in 1204.

== Queen of Thessalonica ==
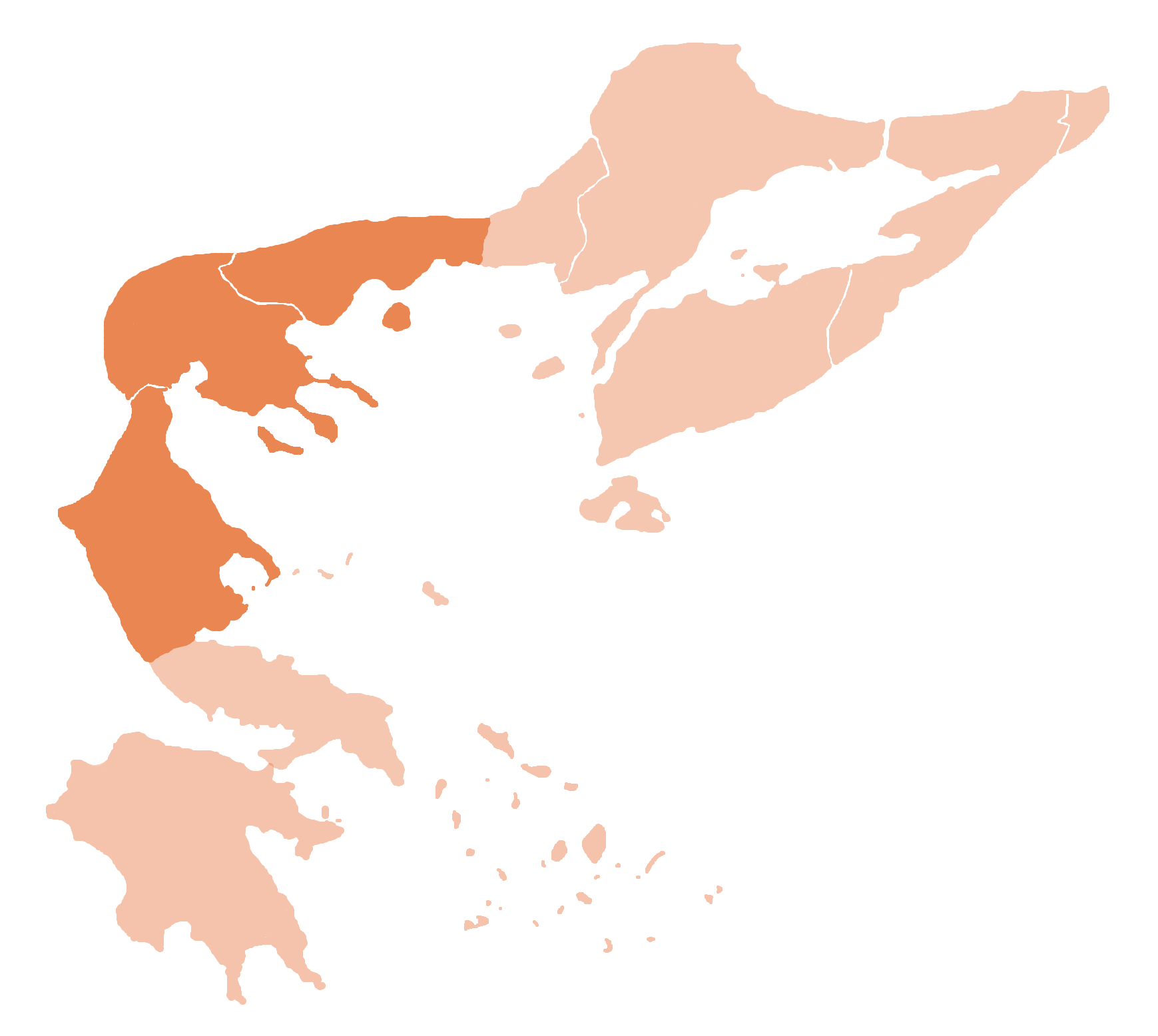
The Kingdom of Thessalonica (1204–1224), within the Latin Empire of Constantinople

Margaret's husband Isaac died in February 1204, "whose end was accelerated by the fate of his son", who was "strangled in his dungeon after poison had failed to do its work". When Boniface I of Montferrat, commander of the land forces at the taken of Constantinople, took the Boukoleon Palace, it was found that Margaret had taken refuge there alongside another dowager empress, Agnes of France. Boniface was one of only two contenders put forth to be elected emperor, but he lost to Baldwin IX of Flanders. As compensation, he was granted "all the territories on the Asiatic side of the Bosphorus as well as the Ille de Griesse [the Peloponnese]." The coronation of the new emperor took place in the church of St Sophia on May 16, 1204.

Later that year, in Constantinople, Empress Margaret married Boniface of Montferrat, with the wedding taking place according to the rites of the Latin Church. The marriage was intended to both bolster Boniface's position with the Byzantine aristocracy and provide him with Margaret's Hungarian connection.

According to Pope Innocent, after the marriage Margaret initially 'shrank from returning to Latin ways so immediately, as a too impudent champion of the Greek custom,' but was pressured by the papacy and her husband to return to the Roman Catholic church. When she accepted a Latin blessing, the pope wrote to her an offered his congratulations.

In this same year of 1204, but after his new marriage, Boniface requested that he be allowed to exchange his lands in Asia for the Kingdom of Thessalonica, which he considered to be better suited for a political alignment with his new brother-in-law Andrew, then Regent of Hungary who would then be his neighbor, and the new emperor agreed to this exchange. Boniface however did not enjoy his domains in peace, being engaged in almost constant warfare until his death. Margaret's step-daughter Agnes of Montferrat was married to the new emperor, Henry of Flanders, in February 1207. That same year, Boniface was returning to Thessalonica when he was ambushed by Bulgarians. He was taken alive and decapitated, his head being sent to Kaloyan of Bulgaria.

== Regency ==
With Boniface, Margaret had a son, Demetrius, in 1207. Boniface left a will designating Demetrius as his successor in Thessalonica under the regency of his mother. His son William, by an earlier marriage, succeeded to the Marquisate of Montferrat. The barons however, knowing that a strong government was necessary, constituted themselves a council of regency for the infant Demetrius.

In 1207, on his father's death, Demetrius became king of Thessalonica, at least in title. When Emperor Henry visited Thessalonica to receive the homage in the infant's name, he was barred from the city by the bailiff Biandrate until he would agree to outrageous demands. The emperor pretended to accept Biandrate's terms (provided that Margaret accepted them) long enough to gain entrance into the city. Margaret, now in the emperor's presence revealed the plot against her son and was instructed to overrule the terms. The emperor then crowned the infant Demetrius king of Thessalonica on 6 January 1209 and extracted oaths from the Lombard lords. His actions were confirmed by Pope Innocent III. Margaret secured the position of regent, as was stipulated in her spouse's will.

Biandrate fled, but conspiring at a distance, returned once more in 1216 to claim the regency. Margaret asked the emperor for assistance: "In response to Queen Margaret's appeal the Emperor hurried to her assistance, but arrived on the scene only to die with mysterious suddenness in the flower of his age." The new Latin emperor, Peter of Courtenay, installed Demetrius' half-brother William as effective ruler. Losing regency, Margaret left Thessalonica, apparently leaving her son Demetrius in the city.

== Later life ==
She married thirdly Nicholas I of Saint Omer. Nicholas was the son of Geoffrey of Saint Omer, had accompanied his uncle on the fourth crusade and was granted a fief in Doris. He is also called "Lord of Boeotia".

With Nicholas, Margaret had two known sons:

- Bela of Saint Omer, who married Bonne de La Roche.
- William of Saint Omer, who married but died childless.

Returning to Hungary with her sons, Margaret was well received by her brother, King Andrew II of Hungary (1205–1235), who granted her possessions in southern regions of the Kingdom, centered on Syrmia. Her sister-in-law Queen Yolanda of Hungary was instrumental in arranging the marriage between Margaret's son John and Matilda, daughter of Yolanda's sister Margaret of Courtenay.

On 30 March 1223, Pope Honorius III took Margaret under his protection, issuing a document that contains a list of her properties.

== Death ==
Margaret was still living in 1229, when she was mentioned in a papal letter. Her exact death date and place, and burial location are apparently unknown.

== Sources ==
- Engel, Pál (2001). The Realm of St. Stephen: A History of Medieval Hungary, 895-1526. London & New York: I.B.Tauris.
- Madgearu, Alexandru (2017). The Asanids: The Political and Military History of the Second Bulgarian Empire (1185–1280). Leiden-Boston: Brill.
- McDaniel, Gordon L. (1984). "On Hungarian-Serbian Relations in the Thirteenth Century: John Angelos and Queen Jelena" (PDF). Ungarn-Jahrbuch. 12 (1982-1983) [1984]: 43–50.
- McDaniel, Gordon L. (1986). "The House of Anjou and Serbia". Louis the Great: King of Hungary and Poland. Boulder: East European Monographs. pp. 191–200.
- Moravcsik, Gyula (1970). Byzantium and the Magyars. Budapest: Akadémiai Kiadó.
- Rodd, Rennell (1907). The Princes of Achaia and the Chronicles of Morea: A Study of Greece in the Middle Ages. Vol. 1. E. Arnold.
- Uzelac, Aleksandar (2025). "Patrimony of Queen Jelena (On the Background of Serbian-Hungarian Conflicts in the Thirteenth and Fourteenth Centuries)" (PDF). Црквене студије: Church Studies. 22: 303–315. Archived from the original on 2025-02-08.
- Van Tricht, Filip (2011). The Latin Renovatio of Byzantium: The Empire of Constantinople (1204–1228). Leiden-Boston: Brill.
- Van Tricht, Filip (2020). "Latin Emperors and Serbian Queens Anna and Helena: Genealogical and Geopolitical Explorations in the Post-1204 Byzantine World". Frankokratia. 1 (1–2): 56–107.
- Van Tricht, Filip (2022). "Being Byzantine in the post-1204 Empire of Constantinople: Continuity and change (politics, government, church and religion)" (PDF). Историјски часопис: The Historical Review. 71: 65–119. Archived from the original on 2024-04-11.
- Van Tricht, Filip (2023). "Being Byzantine in the post-1204 Empire of Constantinople: Continuity and change (society and culture)" (PDF). Историјски часопис: The Historical Review. 72: 67–116. Archived from the original on 2024-06-12.

Margaret of Hungary (Byzantine empress) Árpád dynasty Born: 1175
Royal titles
| Preceded by Agnes of France | Byzantine Empress consort 1185–1195 | Succeeded by Euphrosyne Doukaina Kamatera |
| Preceded by Euphrosyne Doukaina Kamatera | Byzantine Empress consort 1203–1204 | Succeeded by Anna Angelina as Nicean empress |
| Preceded by Euphrosyne Doukaina Kamatera | Byzantine Empress consort 1203–1204 | Succeeded by Maria Petraliphaina as Epirote despoina |
| Preceded by Euphrosyne Doukaina Kamatera | Byzantine Empress consort 1203–1204 | Succeeded by Theodora Axuchina as Trapezuntine empress |
| Preceded by Euphrosyne Doukaina Kamatera | Byzantine Empress consort 1203–1204 | Succeeded by Marie of Champagne as Latin empress |
