= Vendegies-au-Bois =

- Commune
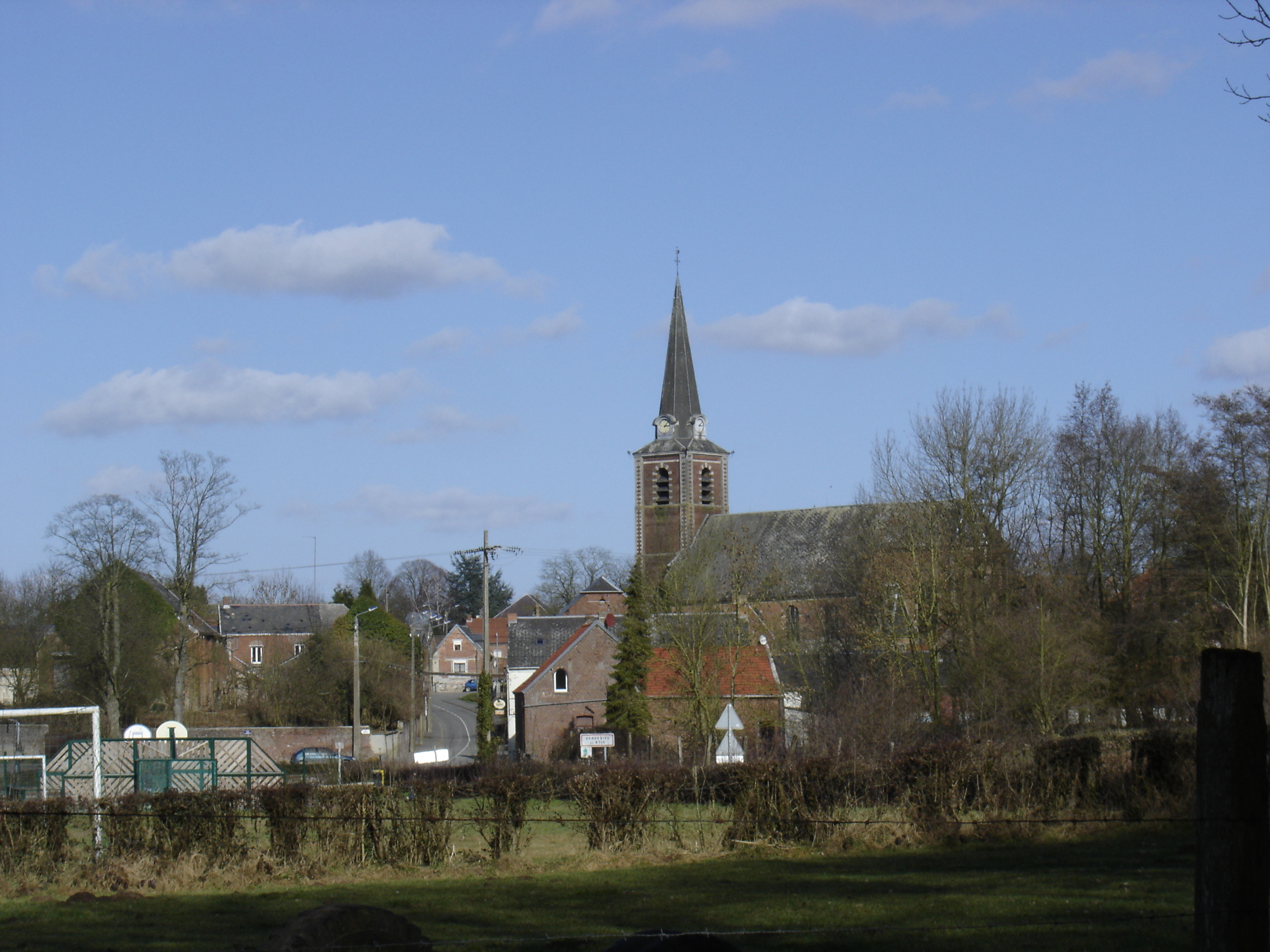
- The church in Vendegies-au-Bois

- Coat of arms
- Location of Vendegies-au-Bois
- Location within France Location within Hauts-de-France
- Coordinates: 50°10′49″N 3°34′46″E
- Country: France
- Region: Hauts-de-France
- Department: Nord
- Arrondissement: Avesnes-sur-Helpe
- Canton: Avesnes-sur-Helpe
- Intercommunality: Pays de Mormal

Government
  - Mayor (2020–2026): Zahra Ghezzou
- Area^{1}: 9.98 km^{2} (3.85 sq mi)
- Elevation: 126 m (413 ft)
- Highest elevation: 147 m (482 ft)
- Lowest elevation: 107 m (351 ft)
- Population (2023): 482
  - Density: 48.3/km^{2} (125/sq mi)
- Time zone: UTC+01:00 (CET)
  - Summer (DST): UTC+02:00 (CEST)
- INSEE/Postal code: 59607 /59218
- ^{1} French Land Register data, which excludes lakes, ponds, glaciers > 1 km^{2} (0.386 sq mi or 247 acres) and river estuaries.

Vendegies-au-Bois (French pronunciation: [vɑ̃d(ə)ʒi o bwa]) is a commune in the Nord department in northern France.

== Heraldry ==
Arms of Vendegies-au-Bois	The arms of Vendegies-au-Bois are blazoned : Vairy Or and azure. (Beaurain, Nieurlet and Vendegies-au-Bois use the same arms.)

== See also ==
- Communes of the Nord department
