= William VI of Saint-Omer =

William VI of Saint Omer was the castellan of Saint-Omer and lord of Fauquembergues briefly in ca. 1246/7.

The genealogist Baldwin of Avesnes records him as a son of William V of Saint Omer, but Arthur Giry has him rather a younger brother of the latter, i.e. he was one of the eleven children of William IV of Saint Omer and Ida of Avesnes. He is first attested in April 1207, and appears thereafter in various charters and documents, in which from 1218 on he appears as lord of Pitgam and later of Berkin. He succeeded his brother sometime between March 1246 and his own only attestation as castellan, in August 1247. Very little is known of his tenure, which apparently was very brief; Baldwin of Avesnes merely records that he went on Crusade, where he died. He was succeeded by his eldest sister Beatrice and her son William of Renenghes by 1251.

== Sources ==
- Giry, Arthur (1874). "Les châtelains de Saint-Omer (1042-1386) (premier article)". Bibliothèque de l'école des chartes (in French). 35: 325–355. doi:10.3406/bec.1874.446568.
- Giry, Arthur (1875). "Les châtelains de Saint-Omer (1042-1386) (deuxième article)". Bibliothèque de l'école des chartes (in French). 36: 91–117. doi:10.3406/bec.1875.446625.
