= Beaurain =

- Commune
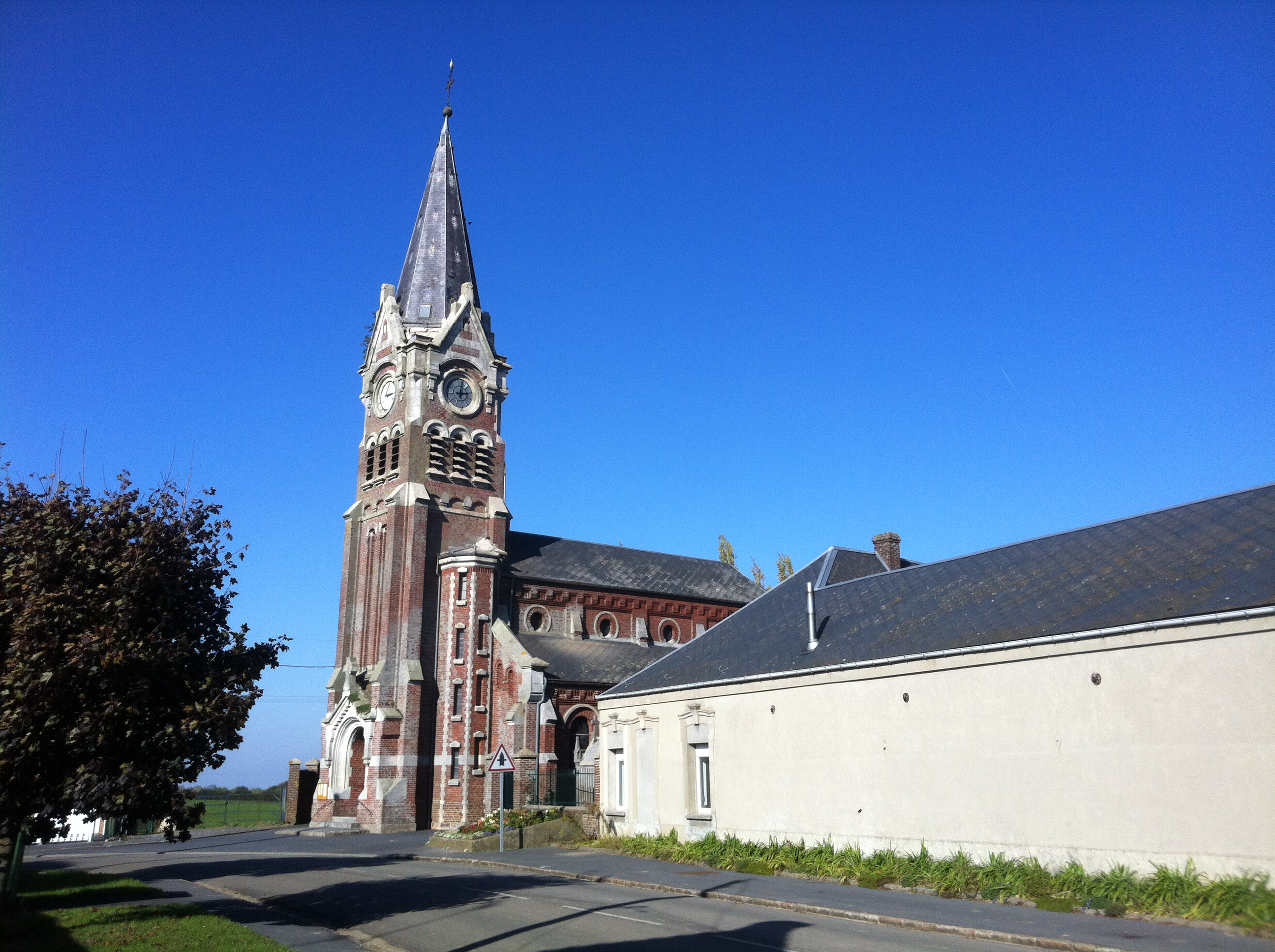
- The church in Beaurain

- Coat of arms
- Location of Beaurain
- Location within France Location within Hauts-de-France
- Coordinates: 50°10′48″N 3°33′09″E
- Country: France
- Region: Hauts-de-France
- Department: Nord
- Arrondissement: Cambrai
- Canton: Caudry
- Intercommunality: CC Pays Solesmois

Government
  - Mayor (2020–2026): Denis Semaille
- Area^{1}: 1.01 km^{2} (0.39 sq mi)
- Elevation: 126 m (413 ft)
- Highest elevation: 131 m (430 ft)
- Lowest elevation: 115 m (377 ft)
- Population (2023): 234
  - Density: 232/km^{2} (600/sq mi)
- Time zone: UTC+01:00 (CET)
  - Summer (DST): UTC+02:00 (CEST)
- INSEE/Postal code: 59060 /59730
- ^{1} French Land Register data, which excludes lakes, ponds, glaciers > 1 km^{2} (0.386 sq mi or 247 acres) and river estuaries.

Beaurain (French pronunciation: [boʁɛ̃]) is a commune in the Nord department in northern France.

== Population ==
Historical population
Year	Pop.	±% p.a.
1968	161	—
1975	155	−0.54%
1982	163	+0.72%
1990	172	+0.67%
1999	171	−0.06%
2007	223	+3.37%
2012	221	−0.18%
2017	231	+0.89%
2023	234	+0.22%
Source: INSEE

== Heraldry ==
Arms of Beaurain	The arms of Beaurain are blazoned : Vairy Or and azure. (Beaurain, Nieurlet and Vendegies-au-Bois use the same arms.)

== See also ==
- Communes of the Nord department
