= Nicholas I of Saint-Omer =

Nicholas I of Saint Omer was a French knight who in the aftermath of the Fourth Crusade became a lord in the Frankish Duchy of Athens.

Nicholas was a younger son of William IV of Saint Omer, castellan of Saint-Omer then in Flanders, and Ida of Avesnes. Ida's brother James of Avesnes took part in the Fourth Crusade (1203–04) and accompanied Boniface of Montferrat in the conquest and partition of Greece in its aftermath. He was rewarded with possessions in Euboea, but was dead by August 1205. Nicholas remained in his native region until ca. 1208, after which he and his brother James came to Greece, where they received a fief at Erimokastro, the site of ancient Thespiae, west of Thebes. According to F. Van Tricht, the fief may have formed part of the Templar possessions that were confiscated ca. 1209 by the Latin Emperor Henry of Flanders. In 1210, he was among the signatories of the concordat with the Latin Church at the Second Parliament of Ravennika.

Nicholas later married Margaret of Hungary, the widow of Boniface of Montferrat, who died in 1207. It is unclear when the marriage took place: F. Van Tricht dates the marriage to after 1217, Longnon "not before 1223" since at this date she is still mentioned as a widow. According to Longnon, medieval sources may have confused Margaret with another Hungarian noblewoman, since she would have been quite old at the date of the purported marriage.

He had two sons, Bela and William. Bela would marry Bonne de La Roche, the sister of Guy I, the Duke of Athens, become lord of one half of Thebes, and lay the foundations for the rise of the Saint Omer family to a prominent position in Frankish Greece.

Nicholas died probably ca. 1235, as he is mentioned in a document dated March 1236-37 suggesting a recent death.

== Sources ==
- Bon, Antoine (1969). La Morée franque. Recherches historiques, topographiques et archéologiques sur la principauté d'Achaïe [The Frankish Morea. Historical, Topographic and Archaeological Studies on the Principality of Achaea] (in French). Paris: De Boccard.
- Giry, Arthur (1875). "Les châtelains de Saint-Omer (1042–1386) (deuxième article)". Bibliothèque de l'école des chartes (in French). 36: 91–117. doi:10.3406/bec.1875.446625.
- Longnon, Jean (1949). L'empire latin de Constantinople et la principauté de Morée (in French). Paris: Payot.
- Jean Longnon, « Problèmes de l'histoire de la principauté de Morée (Deuxième et dernier article) : § V. Les Saint-Omer de Grèce », Journal des savants, juillet-décembre 1946
- Perra, Foteini (2011). Οικογένεια Σεντ Ομέρ. Encyclopedia of the Hellenic World, Boeotia (in Greek). Foundation of the Hellenic World.
- Van Tricht, Filip (2011). The Latin Renovatio of Byzantium: The Empire of Constantinople (1204–1228). Leiden: Brill. ISBN 978-90-04-20323-5.
