= William of Saint-Omer (son of Nicholas I) =

French knight in Hungary

William of Saint Omer was a French knight, descended from a Fauquembergues family who were castellans of the eponymous castle of Saint-Omer.

His father, Nicholas I of Saint Omer, received lands in Boeotia in the aftermath of the Fourth Crusade. He later married Margaret of Hungary, the widow of Boniface of Montferrat, Lord of Thessalonica (died 1207). It is unclear when the marriage took place: some accounts mention that Nicholas died already in 1212 (probably by a misreading of the genealogical table published by Karl Hopf in Chroniques gréco-romanes inédites ou peu connues) but F. Van Tricht dates the marriage to after 1217 and J. Longnon "not before 1223".

William was the younger son of the couple, he had an elder brother Bela of Saint Omer. While Bela received one half of Thebes as dowry from his marriage, William and his mother moved to the Kingdom of Hungary, where Béla IV was the King, also a grandson of Béla III, like William. Following his mother's death sometime after 1223, William inherited her estates in Syrmia and Macsó. He participated in the Battle of Mohi, following this he belonged to the companion of Béla IV who had fled to Dalmatia, escaping before the Mongols. William was ispán of Kraszna County in 1241. From 1241 until his death, he served as Master of the Horse.

Béla IV betrothed William to his second eldest daughter Margaret (not to be confused with Saint Margaret of Hungary), however both persons died by 1242. According to his epitaph at the Cathedral of Saint Domnius, William died in April 1242 in Trogir, where the royal family resided until the Mongol occupation.

== Sources ==
- Bon, Antoine (1969). La Morée franque. Recherches historiques, topographiques et archéologiques sur la principauté d'Achaïe [The Frankish Morea. Historical, Topographic and Archaeological Studies on the Principality of Achaea] (in French). Paris: De Boccard. OCLC 869621129.
- Longnon, Jean (1969) [1962]. "The Frankish States in Greece, 1204–1311". In Setton, Kenneth M.; Wolff, Robert Lee; Hazard, Harry W. (eds.). A History of the Crusades, Volume II: The Later Crusades, 1189–1311. Vol. 2 (Second ed.). Madison, Milwaukee, and London: University of Wisconsin Press. pp. 234–275. ISBN 0-299-04844-6.
- Perra, Foteini (2011). Οικογένεια Σεντ Ομέρ. Encyclopedia of the Hellenic World, Boeotia (in Greek). Foundation of the Hellenic World.
- Van Tricht, Filip (2011). The Latin Renovatio of Byzantium: The Empire of Constantinople (1204–1228). Leiden: Brill. ISBN 978-90-04-20323-5.
- Zsoldos, Attila (2011). Magyarország világi archontológiája, 1000–1301 [Secular Archontology of Hungary, 1000–1301] (in Hungarian). História, MTA Történettudományi Intézete. ISBN 978-963-9627-38-3.

Political offices
Preceded by Denis Türje	Master of the Horse; 1241–1242	Succeeded by Stephen Gutkeled
