= Margaret, Marchioness of Namur =

Marchioness of Namur (c. 1194–1270)

Margaret de Courtenay

Marchioness of Namur
- Reign: 1229–1237

Countess consort of Vianden
- Tenure: 1217–1252
- Born: 1196
- Died: 17 July 1258 (aged 63–64); Marienthal
- Burial: Marienthal monastery
- Spouse: Ralph, Lord of Issoudun; Henry I, Count of Vianden
- Issue: Matilda of Požega; Philip I of Vianden; Henry I van Vianden; Yolanda of Vianden; Frederic of Vianden; Peter of Vianden
- House: Capetian House of Courtenay
- Father: Peter II of Courtenay
- Mother: Yolanda of Flanders

Margaret de Courtenay, Marchioness of Namur (1195 – Marienthal, 1258) was ruling Marchioness of Namur, from 1229 to 1237. She was the daughter of Peter of Courtenay (d. 1219), Latin Emperor of Constantinople (1216-1219) and Yolanda of Flanders (d. 1219). By her second marriage, to Count Henry I of Vianden (d. 1252), Margaret was Countess of Vianden.

== Life ==
Margaret was first married to the French noble Ralph III, Lord of Issoudun (c. 1208). Her husband composed his will in 1212, and died soon after, without sons. According to customs, Ralph's main domains passed to his distant cousin William of Chauvigny, who was also his brother-in-law, while Margaret claimed possession over Châteauneuf-sur-Cher and Mareuil-en-Berry.

Soon after that (c. 1216) she remarried to Count Henry I of Vianden (d. 1252).

In 1216, Margaret's father, Peter, was elected Latin emperor of Constantinople. Since the elevation to the imperial throne in Constantinople (1216), Margaret′s family became involved in creation of new dynastic policies and alliances.

=== Marchioness of Namur ===
Margaret became marchioness of Namur after the death of her brother Marquis Henry II of Namur in 1229. Margaret and her husband, Henry I of Vianden, ruled Namur until 1237, when they had to transfer Namur to Margaret's brother Baldwin. Henry and Margaret continued ruling Vianden.

=== Later life ===
After the death of her husband in 1252, Margaret entered a convent in Marienthal near Luxembourg and became a nun. In 1253, together with her brother Baldwin, she petitioned Pope Innocent IV on behalf of her granddaughter Maria (born to Margaret's daughter Matilda and her husband John Angelos of Syrmia), thus securing papal consent for Maria's marriage to the Picardian noble Anselm of Cayeux. Margaret died in 1258.

== Issue ==
Regarding Margaret's daughter Matilda, who was known to earlier scholars just as the other (unnamed) daughter, mentioned twice in "The Life of Yolanda of Vianden", some researchers believed that she was also born from Margaret's second marriage, with Henry I of Vianden, but later scholars pointed out that Margaret's first husband Raoul III of Issoudun, in his 1212 testament, mentioned their "little daughter" (lat. filiola) Matilda, thus concluding that she was born from Margaret's first marriage. Matilda was later (c. 1230) married to John Angelos (b. c. 1193 - d. before 1253), Lord of Syrmia. They (Matilda and John) had a daughter Maria (c. 1235 - a. 1285) whose husband Anselm (Anseau) de Cayeux (the younger) worked for King Charles I of Naples. Since Maria is mentioned, in some 1280s sources, as sister (lat. soror) of Queen Helen of Serbia (c. 1236–1314), some researchers have proposed that Helen was also a daughter of Matilda, and thus grand-daughter of Margaret.

Margaret and Henry I of Vianden had several children, including:

- Peter, dean in cathedrals of Liège and Cologne (died after 1272).
- Frederic of Vianden, who died in 1247 (5 years before his father). He married Matilda of Salm (b. c. 1223), a daughter of Henry III, Count of Ardennes (seigneur de Viviers, c. 1190–1246 ?), and had a son named Henry, Lord of Schönecken (1248–1299).
- Henry I van Vianden (d. 1267), bishop of Utrecht from 1249 to 1267.
- Philip I (d. 1273), Count of Vianden 1252–1273. He married Marie of Brabant-Perwez, daughter of Godfrey of Louvain, Lord of Perwez, apparently a descendant of Godfrey III, Count of Louvain and Landgrave of Brabant (1142–1190). Their issue was Godefroid I, Count of Vianden (d. 1307 or 1310) and four other children.
- Yolanda of Vianden (1231–1283), prioress of Marienthal, still revered today in Luxembourg.

== Sources ==
- Abbott, Paul D. (1981). Provinces, pays, and seigneuries of France. Myrtleford, Australia. ISBN 978-0-9593773-0-9.
- Angold, Michael (2011). "The Latin Empire of Constantinople, 1204–1261: Marriage Strategies". Identities and Allegiances in the Eastern Mediterranean after 1204. Farnham: Ashgate Publishing Limited. pp. 47–68. ISBN 9781409410980.
- Bácsatyai, Dániel (2017). "A 13. századi francia–magyar kapcsolatok néhány kérdése" (PDF). Századok. 151 (2): 237–278.
- Devailly, Guy (1973). Le Berry du Xe siècle au milieu du XIIIe: Étude politique, religieuse, sociale, et économique. Paris: École pratique des hautes études en sciences sociales; Mouton. ISBN 978-2-307-62543-8.
- Lawson, Richard H., ed. (1995). Brother Hermann's Life of the Countess Yolanda of Vianden. Columbia, SC: Camden House. ISBN 978-1-57113-050-1.
- McDaniel, Gordon L. (1984). "On Hungarian-Serbian Relations in the Thirteenth Century: John Angelos and Queen Jelena" (PDF). Ungarn-Jahrbuch. 12 (1982-1983) [1984]: 43–50.
- McDaniel, Gordon L. (1986). "The House of Anjou and Serbia". Louis the Great: King of Hungary and Poland. Boulder: East European Monographs. pp. 191–200. ISBN 9780880330879.
- Van Houts, Elisabeth (2014). "Yolanda of Vianden (1231-1283): A Reluctant Bride" (PDF). Quaestiones Medii Aevi Novae. 19: 127–143. Archived from the original (PDF) on 29 May 2024.
- Van Tricht, Filip (2011). The Latin Renovatio of Byzantium: The Empire of Constantinople (1204–1228). Leiden-Boston: Brill. ISBN 978-90-04-20323-5.
- Van Tricht, Filip (2020). "Latin Emperors and Serbian Queens Anna and Helena: Genealogical and Geopolitical Explorations in the Post-1204 Byzantine World". Frankokratia. 1 (1–2): 56–107. doi:10.1163/25895931-12340002.

| Preceded by Henry II | Marchioness of Namur; 1229–1237 | Succeeded by Baldwin |
