= Élie Berger =

French palaeographer and archivist

Élie Berger (1850 in Beaucourt – 1925 in Paris) was a French palaeographer and archivist.

Graduated an archivist and palaeographer of the École Nationale des Chartes in 1876, Élie Berger was first a member of the École française de Rome from 1876 to 1880, then a custodian at the Archives nationales of France from 1880 to 1897, when he was elected to the chair of palaeography of the École des Chartes. A Docteur ès lettres in 1895, he was elected a member of the Académie des Inscriptions et Belles-Lettres in 1905.

He was the brother of Philippe Berger and Paul Berger.
