= Michael Angold =

British byzantinist

Michael J. Angold FRHistS
- Born: 1940 (age 85–86)

Academic background
- Education: Corpus Christi College, Oxford (BA, DPhil)
- Thesis: The Administration of the Nicaean Empire (1204–1261) (1967)
- Doctoral advisor: Dimitri Obolensky
- Other advisor: Donald Nicol

Academic work
- Institutions: University of Edinburgh
- Notable works: The Byzantine Empire, 1025–1204: A Political History

Michael Angold (born 1940) is Professor Emeritus of Byzantine History and Honorary Fellow at the University of Edinburgh.

== Biography ==
Angold was educated at Corpus Christi College, University of Oxford, where he took his BA (1961) and DPhil (1967) degrees. He has worked at the University of Edinburgh since 1970, serving as professor of Byzantine history from 1996 until 2005, when he was appointed professor emeritus.

The University of Edinburgh marked his retirement by holding the conference on Ethnonemesis: the creation and disappearance of ethnic identities in the medieval East and West (3–5 June 2005), with Susan Reynolds, Emeritus Fellow of Lady Margaret Hall, Oxford, as keynote speaker.

Angold has published extensively on the social and institutional history of the Byzantine Empire between 1025 and 1261. At the University of Edinburgh he has taught medieval and renaissance history, and acted as the Director of Studies among his many administrative duties. He served as a member of the British National Committee of the Association Internationale pour les Études Byzantines and of the Byzantine Studies panel of the Research Assessment Exercise. He was also the national correspondent responsible for the British bibliographical contributions to the Byzantinische Zeitschrift.

He has been elected a Fellow of the Royal Historical Society.

== Publications ==
=== Books authored ===
- A Byzantine Government in Exile: Government and Society under the Laskarids of Nicaea, 1204–1261 (London: Oxford University Press, 1975)
- The Byzantine Empire, 1025–1204: a Political History (London: Longman, 1984; 2nd edn, New York: Longman, 1997)
- Church and Society in Byzantium under the Comneni, 1081–1261 (Cambridge: Cambridge University Press, 1995)
- Byzantium: the Bridge from Antiquity to the Middle Ages (London: Weidenfeld & Nicolson, 2001; London: Phoenix, 2002)
- The Fourth Crusade: Event and Context (Harlow: Longman, 2003)
- The Fall of Constantinople to the Ottomans (Pearson, 2012). Greek edition Η Άλωση της Κωνσταντινούπολης από τους Οθωμανούς (Κριτική, 2013)

=== Books edited ===
- The Byzantine Aristocracy, IX to XIII Centuries (BAR International Series 221, Oxford: BAR, 1984)
- Eastern Christianity (Cambridge: Cambridge University Press, 2006)

=== Selected articles ===
- "Byzantine 'Nationalism' and the Nicaean Empire", Byzantine and Modern Greek Studies 1 (1975), pp. 49–70
- "The Shaping of the Medieval Byzantine 'City'", Byzantinische Forschungen 10 (1985), pp. 1–37
- "The Wedding of Digenes Akrites: Love and Marriage in Byzantium in the Eleventh and Twelfth Centuries", in Η καθημερινή ζωή στο Βυζάντιο (Τομές καί συνέχειες στην ελληνιστική και ρωμαϊκή παράδοση): Πρακτικά του Α' Διεθνούς Συμποσίου (Αθήνα, 15–17 σεπτεμβρίου 1988), ed. C. Angelidi (Athens: Kentro Vyzantinon Ereunon, 1989), pp. 201–15 ISBN 960-7094-37-9
- "Procopius' portrait of Theodora", in Studies in Honour of Robert Browning, ed. C.N. Constantinides, N.M. Panagiotakes, E. Jeffreys, and A.D. Angelou (Venice: Istituto ellenico di studi bizantini e postbizantini di Venezia, 1996), pp. 21–34
- "The Road to 1204: The Byzantine Background to the Fourth Crusade", Journal of Medieval History 25.3 (1999), pp. 257–78
- "The City Nicaea ca. 1000–1400", in İznik throughout History, ed. Işıl Akbaygil, Halil İnalcık and Oktay Aslanapa (İstanbul: Türkiye İş Bankası, 2003), pp. 27–55 ISBN 975-458-431-1
- "Michael VIII Palaiologos and the Aegean", in Liquid and Multiple: Individuals and Identities in the Thirteenth-Century Aegean, ed. G. Saint-Guillain and D. Stathakopoulos (Paris: Amis du Centre d'histoire et civilisation de Byzance, 2012), pp. 27–44
- "The Accession of John III Doukas Vatatzes", Byzantinoslavica 80 (2022), pp. 120–45
