= War of the Cow =

1272–78 war in the Holy Roman Empire

| Date | 1272 – 1278 |
| Location | Condroz |
| Result | Status quo ante bellum |

Belligerents
| County of Namur; County of Luxemburg; Lordship of Goesnes; Duchy of Brabant | Prince-Bishopric of Liège |

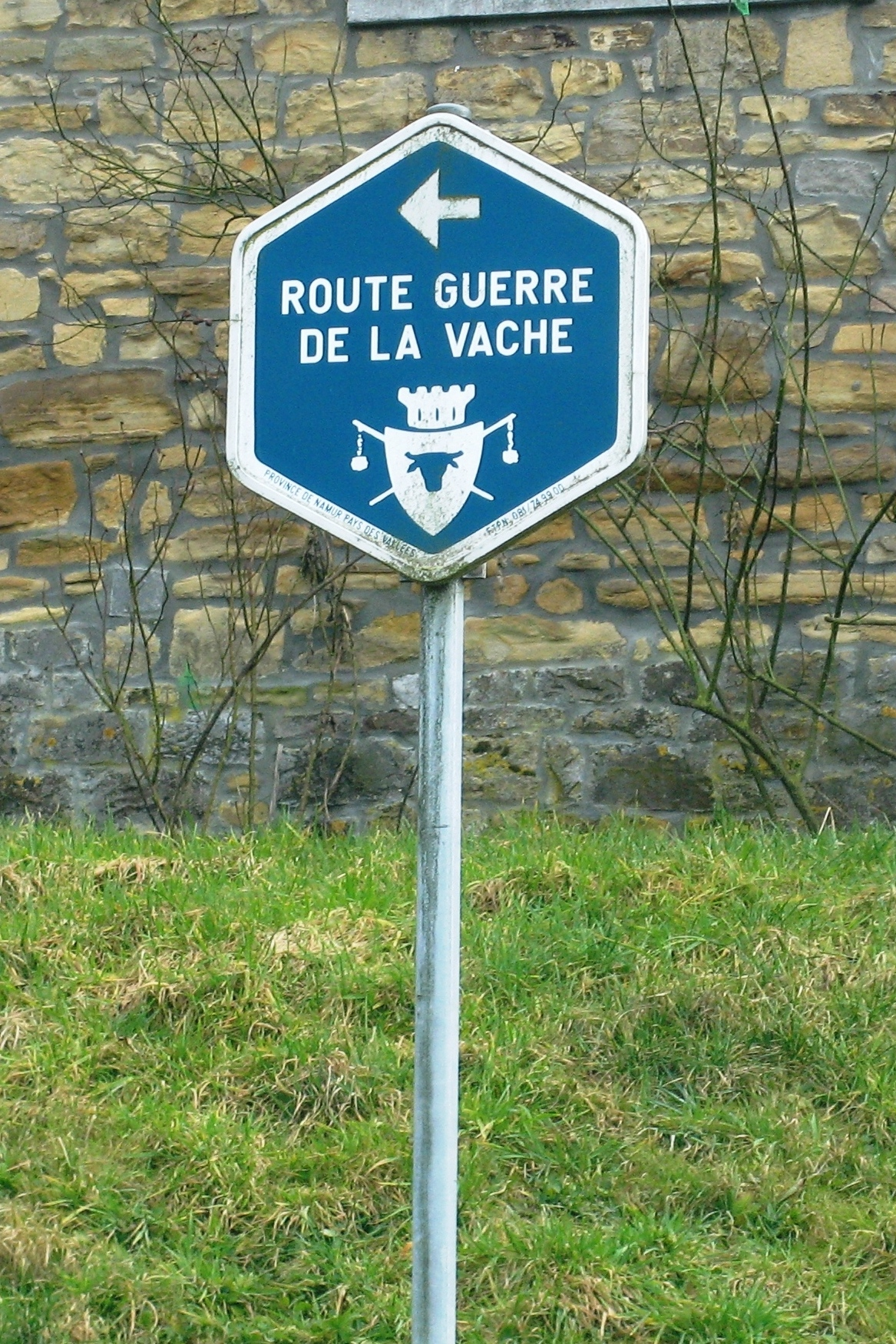
A sign marking the modern-day "Route Guerre de la Vache"

The War of the Cow (1272–78), in French Guerre de la Vache, was a conflict in the Holy Roman Empire between the Prince-Bishopric of Liège under Bishop John of Enghien and the Marquisate of Namur under Marquis Guy of Dampierre. What began as a dispute over stolen property between a peasant from one jurisdiction and a burgess from another became a major regional conflict requiring the arbitration of King Philip III of France, who ordered the restoration of the status quo ante bellum in 1278.

The cause of the war was the theft of a cow by a peasant during a jousting tournament in the city of Ciney, regional capital of Condroz. The thief, Engorant de Jalhay, was caught and ordered to pay a fine (to avoid death) and return the cow. The bailiff's men mistakenly executed the peasant anyway, and the peasant's lord demanded recompense.

The Marquis of Namur, assisted by Duke John I of Brabant and Lord Gerard of Durbuy, invaded Hesbaye; while his ally, Count Henry V of Luxembourg, devastated Condroz. When Henry came to Ciney (17 April 1276) he was met by a locally-raised army of 2,400 men—half cavalry, half infantry, according to the chroniclers—led by the mayor, Jean de Halloy, who was also the bailiff of Condroz who had punished Engorant de Jalhay. In a battle lasting from the early morning until afternoon, the outnumbered Condrusiens were defeated, leaving 500 dead on the field, including Jean de Halloy. Luxembourg had lost 1,400 killed, which led the count to remark, "Three gentlemen for a villein!" When the bishop's marshal, Robert de Forvie, arrived with reinforcements only to find Ciney besieged by the count, he retreated to Dinant with the intention of raising further reinforcements. The next day (18 April) the city was stormed and razed, its inhabitants, who had sought refuge in the church of Notre-Dame, were burnt along with it. All the chroniclers agree on the date—variously expressed as 18 April, 14th kalends of May or the feast of Saint Ursmar. The next day (19 April, Misericordia Sunday) the Duke of Brabant sacked the city of Meeffe.

The next year (1277), at the battle of La Warde de Steppes, a coalition of Liègeois militias was victorious over Namur.

The story of the War is told in great detail by the Liègeois annalists Jean d'Outremeuse and Jean de Hocsem. The Annales Leodienses, Floressienses et Marchianenses on the other hand note only that Ciney (Cheneys) was burned.

== In poetry ==
There is a rhyming chronicle of the conflict, the Chronique rimée sur la guerre de la Vâche, which begins:

Le conte de Namur et se frère Thiris
Li jeune Godefroy de Lovay li marchis
Le dus de Lucenbor et de Baere autresi
Furent a celles jostes et mains barons jolis
Qui par lamour des dames la endroit fu acquis.

In 1852, the Walloon poet Charles du Vivier de Streel published La Cinéide, ou la Vache reconquise, a comic poem on the episode of 1275.

== See also ==
- Chicken War
- Düsseldorf Cow War
- War of the Stray Dog
- Saukrieg

== Sources ==
- Borgnet, Jules (1869). Cartulaire de la commune de Ciney. Namur: Typ. de Ad. Wesmael-Charlier.
- Genicot, L. (1959). "Nouveaux documents relatifs à la guerre dite "de la vache de Ciney"". Namurcum. 33: 51–52, 59–60.
- Gade, John A. (1951). Luxemburg in the Middle Ages. E. J. Brill.
- Poncelet, Édouard (1893). "La Guerre dite "de la Vache de Ciney"". Bulletin de la Commission Royale d'Histoire. 62 (3): 275–395. doi:10.3406/bcrh.1893.2135.
