= Berengar of Namur =

Count Berengarius or Perengarius was an early tenth century Lotharingian noble associated with what is now the Namur region in Belgium. He is the first person who was, later in life, clearly described as a "Count of Namur" in contemporary written records. Earlier records call him a count with jurisdiction of the territory known as the Lommegau, also known as the pagus of Lomme.

He is possibly the ancestor of the first known male line of counts of Namur, which ended with Henry the Blind in 1189, although there is no direct evidence giving his exact relationship.

In 866, Soye, on the north of the Sambre near Namur, is described as being in the pagus of Darnau, in the county of Gilbert (in comitatu Giselberti). Scholars think it is likely that this Gilbert, Count of the Maasgau was the father of the future Duke of Lotharingia, Reginar I.

In 907, Fosses-la-Ville was described as being in the Lommegau (in pago Lominsę), under the comital jurisdiction of Berengar (in comitatu Perengarii).

In 908, Fosses-la-Ville was described as being in the pagus and comitatus called Lomme, held by count Berengar comes Perengarius.

In 911, the Lotharingian nobles under the leadership of Reginar I "Longneck", the Duke of Lotharingia, detached themselves from the eastern Frankish kingdom in what is now Germany, and attached themselves to France, which was at this time ruled by Charles the Simple.

In 912, it is possibly the same Count Berengar who appears together with the duke, Count Reginar, in a charter of Charles the Simple. This Berengar however is described as having jurisdiction over Maifeld which is now in Germany, relatively far from Namur.

In 916, Beringarius comes appears as a witness on a charter of Charles the Simple.

In 919, Berengar was referred to as a count of Namur in a charter of Brogne Abbey.

In 924, Flodoard noted that Berengar had a falling out with his brother-in-law, Gilbert, the Duke of Lotharingia and son of Reginar I, indicating that Berengar was married to Gilbert's sister. Flodoard explained that Berengar captured his brother-in-law, and released him only in exchange for the sons of Gilber's brother, Reginar II who he then held as hostages. Gilbert proceeded to devastate the lands of not only Berengar, but also of his brother Reginar II, and another noble Count Isaac. When Gilbert subsequently sought to be received by Rudolph, the King of France, the king took the advice of his trusted advisors and refused, detesting his perjuries and inconstancy.

In 925 Henry the Fowler invaded Lotharingia, and Duke Gilbert later married Henry's daughter. Eastern Francia (Germany) therefore took back control of it from Western Francia (France).

The 11th century biography of Gérard of Brogne mentions Berengar twice. In one mention it calls him a count of Namur, and another mentions indicates that he was alive in 937.

In 946 the first record of Berengar's successor Count Robert I of Namur appears. His relationship to Berengar is unknown.

== Bibliography ==
- Nonn, Ulrich (1983), Pagus und Comitatus, pp. 144–150
- Flodoard (2004), The 'Annals' of Flodoard of Reims, 919-966, translated by Fanning, Steven; Bachrach, Bernard S., University of Toronto Press, ISBN 9781442600010
