= Counts of Durbuy =

11th and 12th century Frankish noblemen

The Counts of Durbuy were Frankish noblemen in the 11th and 12th century who were descended from Albert II, Count of Namur. Durbuy is a municipality located in the Belgian province of Luxembourg apparently founded (or named) in the 11th century as no earlier mention of it has been found. A chronology of Durbuy can be found in the French Wikipedia article Chronologie de la Terre de Durbuy. The counts were descended from the families ruling Namur and then Limburg.

- Henry I
- Godefroi, son of the previous and father of Richard I, Bishop of Verdun
- Henry II.

It is unclear if Henry I inherited the county from one of his parents (his father was the Count of Namur and his mother the daughter of Gothelo the Great, Duke of Lorraine) or from his wife. After the death of Henry II, Durbuy reverted to his cousin Henry I(IV) the Blind, Count of Namur and Luxembourg. One other Count of Durbuy is recorded, Gérard I, whose grandfather Henry III, Duke of Limburg, was a bitter enemy of Henry the Blind. With some caveats discussed below, the countship progressed as follows:

- Henry the Blind, also Count of Namur (as Henry I) and Luxembourg (as Henry IV)
- Ermesinda of Luxembourg, Countess of Durbuy, daughter of the previous
- Waleran III, Duke of Limburg, and Count jure uxorious of Durbuy, husband of the previous
- Gérard I, Count of Durbuy, son of the previous.

The succession from Henry to Waleran is somewhat murky. Childless, Henry designated his brother-in-law Baldwin IV, Count of Hainaut, as his heir. When Baldwin IV died in 1171, his son Baldwin V became the heir apparent. In 1186, Henry's daughter Ermesinda was born, wreaking havoc on the succession, as Henry declared his previous plans null and void. Baldwin V still claimed his inheritance, but record of his using the title Count of Durbuy is lacking. In an attempt to reclaim her lands, Ermesinda's first husband Theobald I, Count of Bar, besieged the castle at Namur controlled by Phillip I, Margrave of Namur, and Baldwin V, with the resulting capitulation by the owners of the keep. The Treaty of Dinant, signed 6 July 1199 at Saint Medard, returned the lands to Ermesinda. When Theobald dies in 1214, Ermesinda marries Waleran. It is unclear that either Theobald or Waleran ever use the title Count of Durbuy, and hence are not included in the list of counts above.

After Gérard no further references to the Counts of Durbuy can be found. Durbuy transitioned to Emperor Henry VII after the death of Gérard.

== Sources ==
- Gade, John A., Luxembourg in the Middle Ages, Brill, 1951
- Terre de Durbuy, catalogue d'exposition, Durbuy, Halle aux Blés, Ministère de la Communauté française, Direction générale des Arts et des Lettres, Administration du Patrimoine Culturel, 1982
