= Gilbert, Count of the Maasgau =

9th century Frankish noble

Gilbert (Giselbert), Count of Maasgau was a Frankish noble in what would become Lotharingia, during his lifetime in the 9th century. The Carolingian dynasty created this "middle kingdom" and fought over it, and he is mentioned as playing a role on both sides.

After the death of Louis the Pious in 840, Gilbert was a vassal of Charles the Bald in the western kingdom which later became France, but he switched sides to join Charles' brother Lothair I, who would become first king of the future Lotharingia. Gilbert later offered to switch sides again.

Various proposals have been made about his family connections and exact titles, though most of these are considered uncertain.

- Based upon a contemporary description of him as "comes Mansuariorum", it is proposed that he held the Maasau on the lower Meuse.
- He is sometimes seen as a count who held the Pagus Lomacensis, which included the pagus of Darnau.
- He is believed to be a likely ancestor or close relative of Reginar I and the Reginarid dynasty.

== Attestations ==
Nithard, a near contemporary, mentions him twice:

- In 840 after the death of Louis the Pious, a Giselbert is described by Nithard as one of those who defected by not coming when called upon by Charles the Bald to fight his brother Lothar. Nithard's comment indicates that while subjects were faithful to Charles between the Seine and Meuse rivers, men from beyond the Silva Carbonaria, Herenfrid, Giselbert, Bovo and others, broke the pledges of allegiance to Charles.
- In 841, after Charles' victory at the Battle of Fontenay-en-Puisaye, Nithard describes a Gilbert who was "Gislebertus comes Mansuariorum", literally Gilbert count of the Mansuarians - who would be an unknown people. This Gilbert was among the northern notable who Charles the Bald was keen to gain to his side after his victory, and Nithard said that Gilbert offered to join Charles, if Charles should enter his country.

The Annals of Fulda Abbey also make two mentions of a Count Gilbert in subsequent years, who is generally thought to be the same person.

- In 846, the annals mention a Count Gilbert who abducted an unnamed daughter of Lothar I and his wife Ermengarde of Tours. He took her to Aquitaine and married her in an attempt to force Lothair to reinstate him.
- In 848, a few years later, the same Annals of Fulda say that Count Gilbert and Lother were reconciled.

In 870, the Treaty of Meerssen was made, which ceded much of Lotharingia to Charles the Bald. A Count Gilbert was mentioned in some later records from this time:

- In 863, Soye, near Namur is named as a place in the pagus of Darnau, in the county of Count Giselbert.
- In 877, the year of Charles the Bald's death, a Count Giselbert was one of a group of counts from the area towards the Meuse who could support the son of Charles the Bald, Louis the Stammerer.

In 880, the Treaty of Ribemont conceded all of Lotharingia to be once again under the eastern Frankish kingdom ("Germany"). From 884 until his death in 887, the eastern king, Charles the Fat even ruled the western kingdom ("France"). Another possible record of Gilbert is sometimes proposed:

- In 885, a senior Count Gislebert ("illustrissimus comes") had the emperor grant one of his vassals a manse in the villa of "Alnith", including common rights in the forest of "Halsinas", in the pagus of Condroz.

== Mansuaria ==
As explained above, the few records which exist are enough to demonstrate that Count Gilbert was associated with the region between the Silva Carbonaria and the Meuse. However, as is typical for this period, it is difficult to assign exact counties to him in the way that medieval lords would typically be described from the 11th century. The description as comes Mansuariorum, has been the subject of much discussion.

Mansuaria has been given various explanations, which note that the spelling "Masuarinsis" (without "n") is found in another medieval document, the Gesta of the Abbey of St Truiden, which was describing places near modern Diest. It is therefore considered to come from somewhere in that region, probably closer to the Meuse (Maas). There are two main variants:

1. A common proposal is that Mansuaria is simply derived from a spelling variation of the early Frankish "Masau" or Maasao, a gau on both sides of the Meuse (Maas) river north of Maastricht. (One of the surviving manuscripts omits the "n".) Although Diest is not very close to the Meuse, and is not within the area normally described as being in the Masao, another medieval document describes Susteren as being in pago Mosariorum, showing another similar spelling.
2. Alternatively, given that the record from St Truiden is not referring to an area near the Meuse, this term is seen as the name of a larger jurisdiction whose definition is no longer known, probably connected to the Hesbaye and possibly also the Meuse gau. Variants have been argued by Maurice Gysseling, Gorissen, Eugen Ewig, Ulrich Nonn and others, and these also note that there was a "Via Mansuarisca" in the Ardennes, distant from both the Hesbaye and the Meuse/Maas.

== Family ==
Gilbert's background is not known. The similarity of his apparent son's name to the name "Ragnar" has been used as an argument to suggest a Viking connection. Another possibility is that he was related to a man named Reginar, son of Meginhere (a nobleman from the court of Charlemagne).

Rösch suggests that Gilbert's wife was named Ermengarde, but there is no conclusive evidence that this is correct.

Children may include:

- Reginar I (c. 850–916). There is no primary source unequivocally stating that Reginar was Gilbert's son.
- Albert is mentioned as a brother of Reginar, probably Reginar I or a relative.
