= Pagus Lomacensis =

The gau or pagus of Lomme, often referred to using Latin, Pagus Lomacensis, or German Lommegau, was an early Austrasian Frankish territorial division, which included the fort of Namur, and evolved into the later County of Namur. The oldest Latin spellings were Laumensis or Lomensis.

In modern terms Lomme lay in what is now central Wallonia in French-speaking Belgium. It corresponds roughly with the part of the modern Province of Namur which is west of the Meuse. It also stretched into what is now Walloon Brabant in the north, the Belgian Province of Hainaut in the west, and to the south, into what is now France.

== Subpagi ==
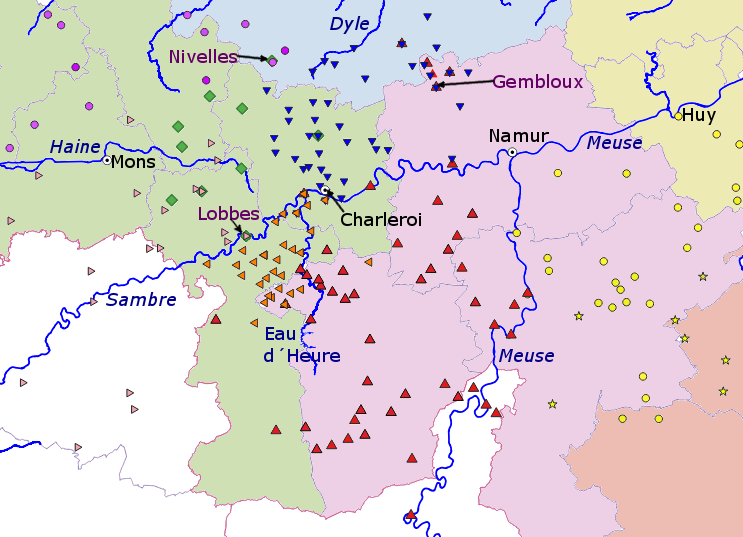
Early medieval pagi mapped on modern Belgian provinces. Red triangles are places recorded as being in Lommegau. Blue triangles were in Darnau. Orange were in the Sambre gau. These were both also a part of the Lommegau.

The pagus Lomacensis had two major subpagi: the pagus Darnuensis, and the pagus Sambriensis. Today, both of these are in the Belgian province of Hainaut. Records show that places within these sub-divisions of Lomme could also be described as being in Lomme, and they might not have had exact definitions.

- The Sambriensis pagus, named after the Sambre, is mainly known from the records of Lobbes Abbey, and includes places mainly south of the stretch of the Sambre river between modern Lobbes and Charleroi, and west of the Eau d'Heure river.
- The Darnau pagus is also mainly known from Lobbes-related records, including a threat in 982 by Bishop Notger of Liège to excommunicate many of them if they did not stop paying their processional fees to Nivelles Abbey or the Collegiate church of Foillan at Fosses-la-Ville instead of Lobbes (Roland p. 52). It is found mainly north of the Sambre, where it bordered upon the pagi of Brabant and Hesbaye (Hasbania).

These two subpagi overlapped near what is now Charleroi, which was not an important city in the Middle Ages, and was known as Charnoy.

Léon Vanderkindere proposed that these were older, and that the pagus Lomacensis represents a fusion of several such older pagi. However more recent writers such as Roland and Nonn see no evidence for this.

There was also one mention of a pagus of Namur in the Lomme area in 832, but Namur was not mentioned again as an important jurisdiction until the late tenth century when it started to be referred to as a county.

== Counts and counties ==
Before the counts of Namur, there is very little clear information about early counts with counties in the Lommegau. However, many of the 9th and 10th century documents which mention Lomme simply describe it as the county of Lomme (comitatus Laumensis), often mentioning no other pagus. This implies strongly that Lomme was considered to be one single county. Nonn lists 11 such records between 862 and 979. Some notable examples show the way in which the mentions of the strategic fort at Namur increased:

- In 866, Soye, on the north of the Sambre near Namur, is described as being in the pagus of Darnau, in the county of Gilbert (in comitatu Giselberti).
- In 907, Fosses-la-Ville is described as being in the pagus of Lomme, in the county of Berengar (in comitatu Perengarii). Count Berengar is known from other documents. He is also mentioned in a charter from Brogne Abbey calling him Count of Namur ("Berengarii comitis Namurcensis"). A later medieval narrative source concerning Brogne describes him as a count who held the fort of Namur. It is known that he married a daughter of Reginar I but his connection to the following count of Namur is uncertain.
- In 908, Fosses-la-Ville was described as being in the pagus and county of Lomme, held by count Perengarius.
- In 919, Berengar was referred to as a count of Namur in a charter of Brogne Abbey.
- In 946, Count Robert granted Melin to Waulsort Abbey, described as being in his county (in comitatu meo), and in the pagus Lomacinsus. This Robert is the first certain ancestor of the later counts of Namur.
- In a royal charter also of 946, Gembloux is described as being in the county known as Lomme and Darnau (in comitatu scilicet Lomacensi atque Darnuensi). The same wording was used again in a royal charter of 979.
- In 958 a royal charter mentions Chastre near Gembloux being in the pagus of Darnau and in the county of Count Robert (ac in Rotberti comitis).
- In 986, Brogne is described as being in the pagus of Lomme, in the county of Namur, the first appearance of this title.
- In 992, a Count of Namur was named for the first time a royal charter, Adalbert, the son of Robert.

After the 10th century, the title of Count of Namur was used, making the gau names less useful.

== History ==
The pagus was already mentioned in Merovingian times. After a possibly falsified document of 660, more surviving records start in the second half of the 8th century, in the time when the Carolingians were taking charge of the Frankish realm.

The Lommegau was one of the oldest Frankish geographical sub-divisions in what is now Belgium. Around 800, the Bishop of Liège addressed himself to the Christian community of the time, and named only Condroz, Lomme, Hasbania, and the Ardennes, with no mention of the Maas valley or Texandria further north. The northern part of the Roman Civitas Tungrorum probably no longer had clear boundaries, and missionary work to extend the Christian diocese was on-going at this time.

In 843, in the Treaty of Verdun, and in 870 in the Treaty of Meerssen, the "Lomensum" was mentioned, which is interpreted as a single county, for example by Ulrich Nonn. It switched between kingdoms. In 843 it became part of the "Middle Kingdom" of Lothar I, the future Lotharingia. In 870 it became part of the western kingdom for some time, which would later become France.

Together with the rest of Lotharingia, during the 10th century it became a long-run part of the Holy Roman Empire, and by the 11th century new counties such as the County of Namur stabilized into the forms known throughout the rest of the Middle Ages. Namur was a frontier province confronting France and heavily influenced by it, and sometimes considered to be a March.

== Territory ==
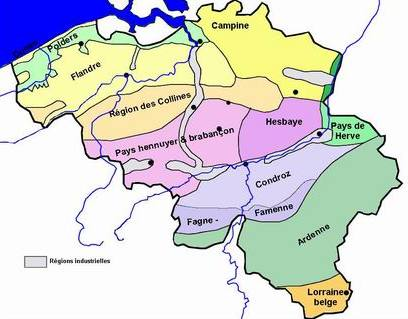
The natural regions of Belgium Condroz

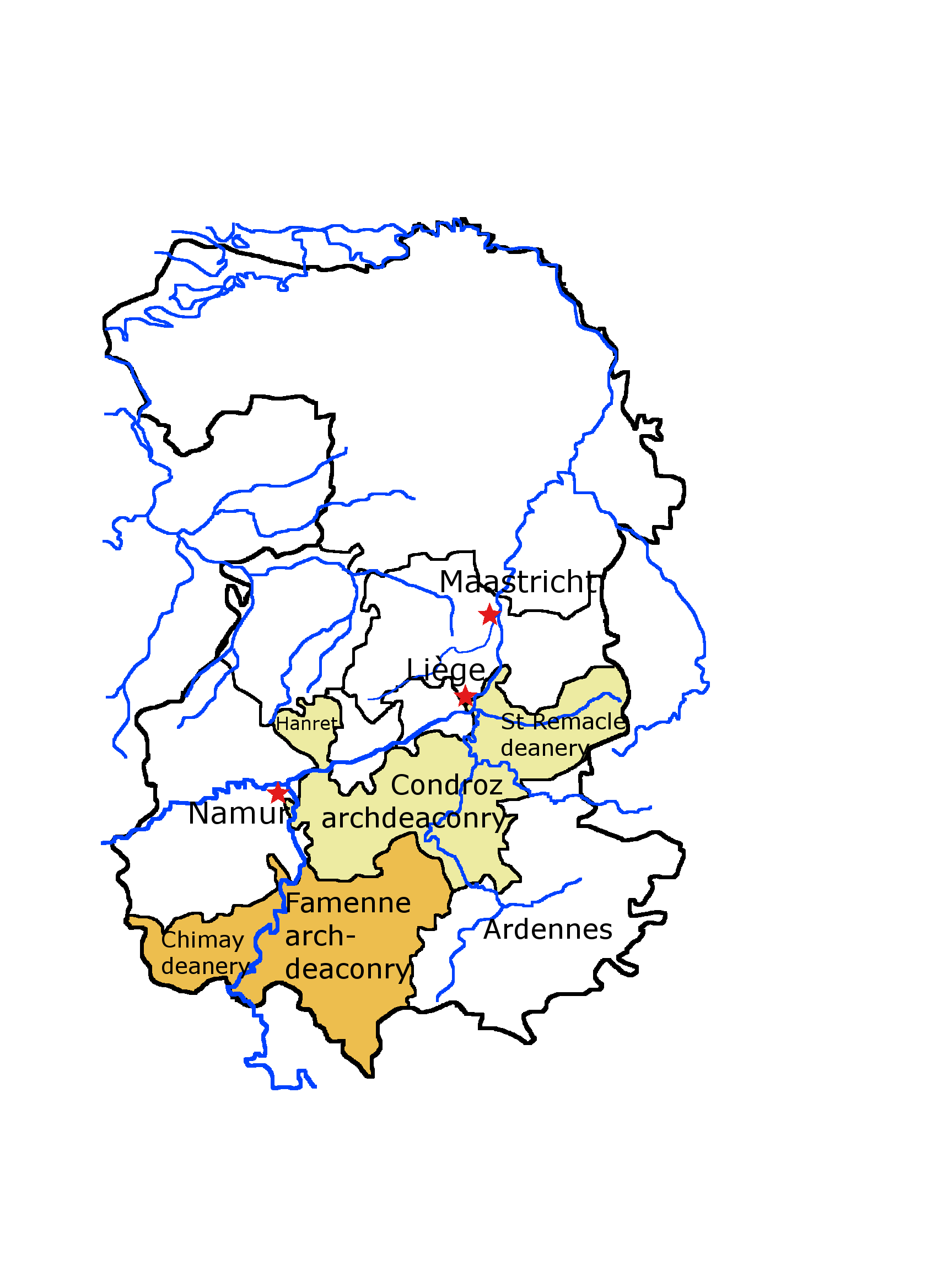
Late medieval catholic jurisdictions of Condroz and Famenne, within the archbishopric of Liège.

A major part of the pagus was enclosed by the Sambre and Meuse rivers, a region sometimes referred to in French as the Entre-Sambre-et-Meuse(fr) region. The Sambre joins the Maas at the city of Namur, in the northeast corner of the pagus.

South of the Sambre, near Namur, are rolling hills, and in modern times it is considered to be part of the geographical Condroz, though it was not part of the medieval pagus of Condroz, which was originally only east of the Meuse.

The southern part of the Lommegau is today referred to as the Fagne region. It approaches the Ardennes and is more heavily hilly and forested, and is similarly often grouped with the lands over the Meuse to the east, in the geographically similar Famenne region, which was originally a subpagus of the Condroz. Also the church jurisdictions of the Fammene and Fagnes were joined under a single archdeanery.

In the west and south of these two parts of the Lommegau, were forested and hilly areas which help define a natural boundary between France and Belgium. In the late Roman times these forests also helped define the boundary between the Roman provinces of Belgica secunda and Germania secunda, and therefore they later helped define the medieval church archdioceses of Reims and Cologne, which were partly based upon Roman provinces.

During the evolutions of the Frankish kingdoms, the southern frontier also remained an important one, defining the boundary between Neustria and Austrasia in Merovingian times. In Carolingian times it continued to form the boundary of Western Francia which evolved into France.

== Bibliography ==
- Nonn, Ulrich (1983), Pagus und Comitatus
- Roland, Charles Gustave (1920), "Les pagi de Lomme et de Condroz et leurs subdivisions", Annales de la Société archéologique de Namur, 34: 1–126, archived from the original on 2020-06-05
