= Testament of Charlemagne =

The Testament of Charlemagne was documented and witnessed in 811, the 43rd year of his reign. Charlemagne had intended to make a last will and testament in order to share his wealth with his daughters and the children of his concubines (his sons mostly inheriting parts of his kingdom). Unfortunately, it was begun too late and was not finished before his death in 814. Nevertheless, three years prior, he made a division of his possessions, ratified in the presence of the faithful who were called upon as witnesses. The text of this testament is quoted from Einhard.

The division of his stores of gold, silver, precious stones and royal ornaments was into three lots. Two of these lots were further divided into twenty-one parts, to be distributed to the recognized metropolitan cities, with each archbishopric receiving alms. They were to be used for charity. These included: Rome, Ravenna, Milan, Friuli, Grado, Cologne, Mainz, Salzburg, Trier, Sens, Besançon, Lyon, Rouen, Reims, Arles, Vienne, Tarentaise, Embrun, Bordeaux, Tours, and Bourges.

The third lot was to be further divided into four parts. The first of these parts was apportioned to the twenty-one cities above. The second part was assigned to his sons and daughters, and to the sons and daughters of his sons, in equal portions. The third lot was allocated to the poor, and the fourth, to the men and maid servants on duty in the palace. Further designations for books, three silver tables and a gold table were also made.

== List of witnesses ==
Of interest is the list of bishops, abbots and counts called upon to witness this historical event. They include the following:

Bishops

- Hildebold, Archbishop of Cologne (785–818), administered last sacrament to Charlemagne
- Richolf, Archbishop of Mainz (787–813)
- Arno, Archbishop of Salzburg (784–821)
- Wulfar, Archbishop of Rheims (812–816)
- Bernoin, Archbishop of Clermont (811–823)
- Leidrad, Archbishop of Lyons (798–814)
- John II, Archbishop of Arles (between 811 and 816)
- Theodulf, Bishop of Orléans (788–821)
- Jesse, Bishop of Amiens (799–836)
- Heito, Bishop of Basel (802–822)
- Walcaud, Bishop of Liège (809–831)

Abbots

- Fridugis, Abbot of Saint Martin de Tours
- Adalung, Abbot of Lorsch
- Engilbert (Angilbert), Abbot of Saint-Riquier, the reputed father of the illegitimate children of Bertha, daughter of Charlemagne
- Irmino, Abbot of Saint-Germain-des-Prés (812–817)

Counts

- Walah, later Abbot of Corbie under Louis the Pious, c. 822
- Meginher, son-in-law of Hardrad who had conspired against Charlemagne
- Otulf (perhaps Count Audulfus in Bavaria at this time)
- Stephen, Count of Paris, son of Gerard I of Paris
- Unruoc, grandfather of the Emperor Berengaius
- Burchard, a constable mentioned in the Annales Regni Francorum
- Meginhard, a count sent as an envoy to the Danish King Hemming in 810
- Rihwin, possibly Ricouis, Count of Padua
- Edo, possibly Count Uodo, who accompanied Meginhard on his mission in 810
- Gerold, Lord of the Eastern Marches from 811–832, probably the son of Gerold, Prefect of Bavaria
- Bero, or Bera, Count of Barcelona, 813
- Hildigern
- Hroccolf
