= County of Namur =

State of the Holy Roman Empire (c. 981–1797)

The county of Namur within the Low Countries in 1350

The County of Namur (Dutch: Namen) was a county of the Holy Roman Empire with its military and administrative capital at the town of Namur, at the merging of the Sambre and Meuse rivers in what is now French-speaking Belgium. Under this name it existed from about 990 until about 1790.

Like most of what is now Belgium, during the 15th century the County of Namur became part of the Burgundian Netherlands, which subsequently became a possession of the kings of Spain, and later of Austria. Like its neighbours, the county ceased to exist during the French Revolution, when the entire region was conquered by the revolutionary French Republic.

The modern Belgian province of Namur is larger than the old county. The boundaries of the province are based upon those of the French départment of Sambre-et-Meuse, and stretch further eastwards and southwards.

== Prehistory to the Roman period ==
The city of Namur most likely arose around 'the Champeau', a rocky hill between the Sambre and Meuse rivers. Numerous prehistoric flint weapons have been found in the area. During Roman times, the region around Namur was first mentioned in Julius Caesar's Commentarii de Bello Gallico in the second half of the 1st century BC. The exact boundaries of the peoples he mentioned are not known, but to the west of Namur were the Nervii, and to the east the Germani cisrhenani. It has been suggested that Namur itself may have been within the territory of the Aduatuci who Caesar described as descendants of the Cimbri and Teutons, whose main fort was possibly at Thuin.) Caesar and the Romans conquered the Belgae cities and their territory were incorporated into the Roman Empire.

== Origins ==
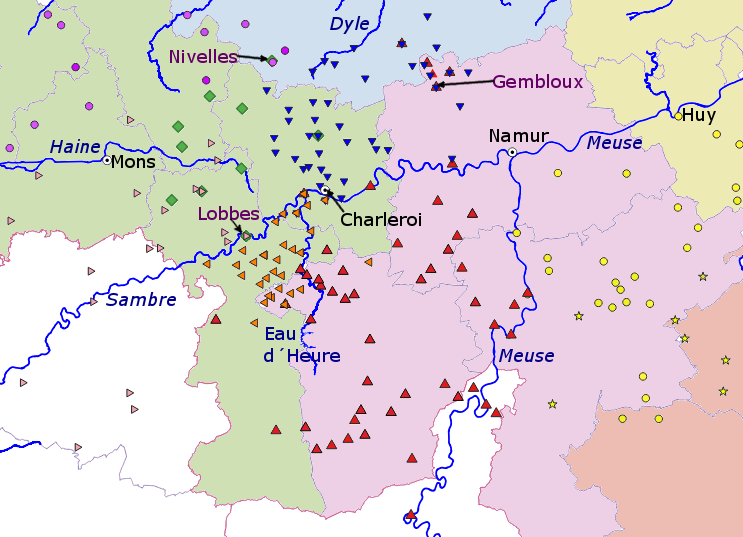
Modern Namur province is in pink. Red triangles are places recorded as being in the early medieval Lommegau. The smaller Darnau (blue triangles) and Sambre gau (orange) were both sometimes treated as parts of the Lommegau.

From at least the 8th century, the larger region between the Sambre and Meuse rivers was in fact commonly referred to as the gau or pagus of Lomme (the pagus Lomacensis in Latin, or Lommegau in German), which also stretched north of the river junction, at least as far as Gembloux. From at least about 800, this region was one of the ones under the religious jurisdiction of the bishopric of Liège, along with Hasbania, Condroz and the Ardennes to the west of it.

During the late 9th century, and throughout the 10th century, there are also references to a county of Lomme (comitatus Lomacensis), apparently indicating that this region had only one count. In the year 832 a document by Emperor Louis the Pious indicates that at least part of the region could be referred to as the pagus of Namur, because it refers to Beez and Wépion, two places now within the city of Namur, as being in the countryside (pagus) of Namur (Latin: in pago Namurcensis). There was however no mention is this period of any county or count of Namur. During the 10th century, records mentioning local counts Berengar, his possible descendant Robert, and Robert's son Albert I, demonstrate that the counts of Lomme were established at a fort in Namur. Berengar was referred to as a count of Namur in 919, but it is only in the time of Albert that the normal terminology changed. An imperial document of 992 calls Albert a count of Namur. Another imperial document of 986 refers to a county of Namur, when it says that Brogne was in the pagus of Lomme, and the county of Namur. After this period, the term Lomme was no longer used.

== The first house of Namur ==
First house of Namur

Robert I	Charles; Duke of Lower Lotharingia; Son of King Louis IV of France
Albert I, Count of Namur	Ermengarde	Gerberga m. Lambert I, Count of Louvain d.1015	Gozelon, Duke of Lower Lotharingia	Count Frederic; Count in the Ardennes
Robert II, Count of Namur	Albert II, Count of Namur d.1067	Regelinde	Gilbert, Count of Luxembourg
Henry I of Durbuy	Albert III d.1102 Count of Namur; Acting Duke of Lower Lotharingia	Ida married twice	Frederick d.1065 Duke of Lower Lotharingia	Conrad, Count of Luxembourg
Henry I of La Roche	Godefrid, Count of Namur d.1139	Ermensinde of Luxembourg
Henry the Blind d.1196 Count of Namur and Luxembourg, Lord of Durbuy and La Roche	Alice d.1169 Heirs inherited Namur from Henry m. Baldwin IV, Count of Hainaut

Albert III (1063–1102) took over some positions which had been held by his wife's previous husband, including the office of advocate of the Princely Abbey of Stavelot-Malmedy. Until the start of the 12th century, Namur was threatened by its powerful neighbours Brabant, Hainaut and Liège. Important parts of the county were annexed. The city of Dinant, for example, came into possession of Liège. From the 12th century on, the counts of Namur managed to more or less compensate for the losses they had suffered. Count Godfrey, for example, acquired the county of Longwy, thanks to his marriage with Ermesinde of Luxembourg.

The last ruler in the first line that ruled Namur was Henry the Blind (1139–96), who also inherited the counties of Durbuy, La Roche-en-Ardenne and Luxembourg. These however went to a different heir.

== 12th and 13th centuries ==
After Henry's death, a fierce succession war broke out between his sister's son Baldwin V, Count of Hainaut, and Henry's daughter Ermesinde. Baldwin V, who also became count of Flanders, eventually received the county of Namur, while Ermesinde received the Ardennes counties of Luxembourg, Laroche and Durbuy.

The counties of Flanders, Hainaut and Namur didn't remain united for long, eventually coming into the hands of the descendants of three different lines of descendants of Baldwin's daughters. In 1263 the count of Namur, Baldwin II of Courtenay, sold his county to the count of Flanders, Guy of Dampierre. A branch of the house of Dampierre ruled until 1429. In 1421 John III sold the right to inherit Namur to the Duke of Burgundy, Philip the Good, who was also count of Flanders. Philip became count of Namur on John's death in 1429. Namur, Flanders, Hainaut, Luxembourg, Brabant, and Holland became united under Philip of Burgundy.

Houses of Flanders, Courtenay, and Dampierre in Namur

Henry the Blind d.1196	Alice of Namur; Inherited Namur from Henry d.1169	Baldwin IV, Count of Hainaut d.1171 House of Flanders
Counts of Luxembourg	Baldwin V, Count of Hainaut, Flanders, and Namur d.1195
Baldwin VI of Hainaut, 1st Latin Emperor; Count of Flanders and Hainaut	Philip I of Namur d.1212	Henry of Flanders d.1216 2nd Latin Emperor	Yolanda of Flanders d.1219 Latin Empress m. Peter II of Courtenay, 3rd Latin Emperor
Margaret; Countess of Flanders m1. Bouchard of Avesnes m2. William II of Dampierre	Philip II, Marquis of Namur d.1226	Robert of Courtenay d.1228 4th Latin Emperor	Henry II, Marquis of Namur d.1229	Margaret, Marchioness of Namur; Ejected by Baldwin 1237	Baldwin; 5th Latin Emperor; Sold the county 1256
Counts of Hainaut	William of Dampierre d.1251 Count of Flanders	Guy of Dampierre d.1305 Count of Flanders; Purchased Namur d.1305
Robert of Béthune d.1322 Count of Flanders	John I, Marquis of Namur d.1330
Louis, Count of Nevers d.1322	John II, Marquis of Namur d.1335	Guy II, Marquis of Namur d.1336	Philip III, Marquis of Namur d.1337	William I, Marquis of Namur d.1391
Louis I, Count of Flanders d.1346	William II, Marquis of Namur d.1418	John III, Marquis of Namur d.1429 Sold the county 1421
Louis of Male d.1384 Count of Flanders m. Margaret of Brabant; Successfully claimed the Duchy of Brabant
Margaret of Flanders d.1405

== The Burgundian and Habsburg periods ==
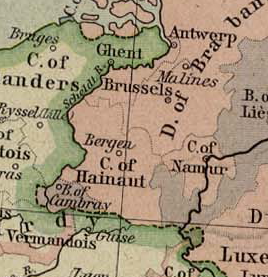
Hainaut and Namur in 1477

Philip the Good integrated the county of Namur into a large territorial and political union, called the Burgundian Netherlands. From the 15th century on, the county of Namur, along with the rest of the Netherlands, were ruled by the Habsburgs. During this period, the Burgundians and Habsburgs strengthened the city and built new walls around it. During the 16th and 17th centuries, the city became an important military stronghold, and was repeatedly besieged for this reason.

Houses of Burgundy and Habsburg

1. Philip I, Duke of Burgundy d.1361 Duke of Burgundy	Margaret III, Countess of Flanders d.1405 married twice	2. Philip the Bold d.1404 Son of the King of France
Margaret of Bavaria d.1424 Sister of Countess of Holland, Zeeland and Hainaut	John the Fearless d.1419 Count of Flanders; Duke of Burgundy	Anthony, Duke of Brabant d.1415
Philip the Good d.1467 Duke of Burgundy, Count of Flanders, Purchased Namur, Also gained Hainaut, Brabant, Holland, Luxembourg etc.	John IV, Duke of Brabant d.1427	Philip I, Duke of Brabant d.1430
Charles the Bold d.1477 Duke of Burgundy and Brabant; Count of Flanders, Namur, Hainaut, Holland, Luxembourg etc.
Mary of Burgundy d.1482 Duchess of Burgundy and Brabant; Countess of Flanders, Namur, Hainaut, Holland, Luxembourg etc.	Maximilian of Habsburg d.1519 Holy Roman Emperor; Archduke of Austria
Philip the Handsome d.1506 Duke of Burgundy and Brabant; Count of Flanders, Namur, Hainaut, Holland, Luxembourg etc.	Joanna of Castile d.1555 Heiress of Castile and Aragon
Charles V, Holy Roman Emperor d.1558 Holy Roman Emperor, King of Spain; Count of Flanders, Namur, Hainaut, Holland, Luxembourg etc.	Ferdinand I, Holy Roman Emperor; Heir to Charles in Austria
Philip II of Spain d.1598 King of Spain; Count of Flanders, Namur, Hainaut, Holland, Luxembourg etc.

The Spanish king Philip II wanted to turn Namur into a Roman Catholic bastion as a bulwark against the rise of Calvinism. Namur received a bishopric's seat in 1559 and several religious orders were required to establish themselves in Namur. In consequence, the city gained a specific Catholic character. Philip II also managed to make considerable reinforcements to the Citadel of Namur. In 1577, Philip II sent Don Juan of Austria to the Netherlands as the new governor. In Namur, Don Juan received Margaret of Valois (the sister of the French king), and organised a magnificent celebration in her honor.

== Troubled times and changing rulers ==
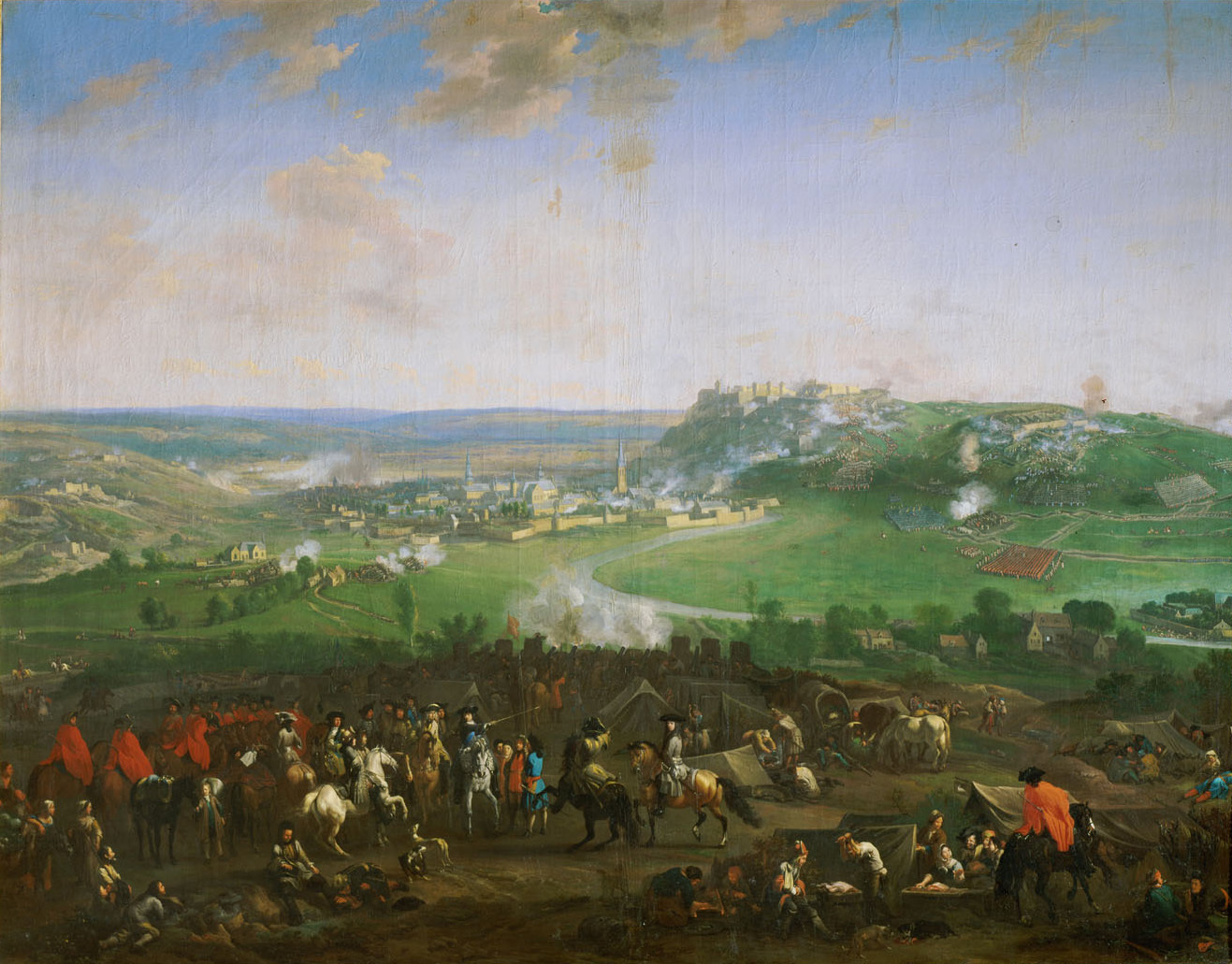
The Siege of Namur during the Nine Years' War, 1695

Namur has had a crucial military role throughout history. After the Spanish period, the strategically important city was repeatedly besieged. In 1692, the troops of Louis XIV took the city after a lengthy and furious siege. Louis and his legendary military engineer Sébastien Le Prestre de Vauban personally oversaw the siege. Three years later, in 1695, William III of Orange retook Namur. But the Dutch occupation did not last long. At the Treaty of Utrecht of 1713, the Southern Netherlands came under the rule of the Austrian house of Habsburg. Though the Austrians ruled over the city, the strategically important citadel remained in the hands of the Dutch. The Austrian rule returned peace and calm to the Netherlands.

== The French revolutionists and the United Kingdom of the Netherlands ==
In 1790 the county of Namur was one of the founders of the failed United States of Belgium. Some years later, in 1794, the revolutionary France occupied Namur, immediately introducing a repressive regime. The county of Namur ceased to exist, becoming part of the newly created French department of Sambre-et-Meuse. The French occupation was ended following Napoleon's defeat at the Battle of Waterloo in 1815. In the Congress of Vienna that followed, the southern and Northern Netherlands were combined to form the short-lived United Kingdom of the Netherlands. The French departments were turned into provinces, and renamed. In this period, the citadel was again rebuilt and more or less received its present-day looks. The kingdom of the Netherlands also didn't last long. In 1830 the Belgian Revolution broke out, in which Belgium became independent from the Netherlands. The strategically important bastion of Namur played a decisive role in the battles associated with the Belgian Revolution.

== Economic activities ==
The economic activities of the County of Namur were diverse. Next to the cultivation of grapes in the river valleys, the agriculture also cultivated flax, that formed the basis of the wool industry. Clay formed the raw materials for the ceramic-production and for the making of molds for the so-called dinanderie, the overall name for the yellow copper brass art objects such as lecterns, candleholders, tableware and others. The metal industry was also important: in the 16th century the mouth of the Meuse (Dinant, Bouvignes, Namur, but also Huy and Liège) was the central region for metallurgy in the Southern Netherlands. Along the banks of the Meuse, limestone was mined and exported.

== See also ==
- List of rulers of Namur
