= Meginhere =

Frankish count and nobleman (died after 811)

Meginhere (Meginher, Meginherus) (died after 811), a Frankish count and nobleman from the court of Charlemagne, a confidant of the emperor. Meginhere was one of the witnesses of the last will and testament of Charlemagne. Meginhere is believed to be related to Gilbert, Count of the Maasgau, father of Reginar, Duke of Lorraine, although the precise relationship is unknown.

Meginhere married an unknown daughter of Hardrad, an early conspirator against Charlemagne. They had one son:

- Reginar (Reginhere), a Frankish nobleman.

Taking after his grandfather, Reginar was himself a conspirator against the crown, in his case, Louis the Pious. His relative, Reginar II, was father to Emmo, Count of Hesbaye. Reginar II is believed to be the same as identified as the count of Missaticum 4 in the Capitulary of Servais implemented by Charles the Bald in 853.

== Sources ==
- Turner, Samuel Epes (Translator), Einhard: The Life of Charlemagne, Harper & Brothers, New York, 1880, reprinted by the University of Michigan Press in 1960 with a copyrighted foreword by Sidney Painter
- Thorpe, Lewis G. M., Two Lives of Charlemagne, Penguin, 1969, page 90 and footnote 106
