= Robert of Namur =

Robert of Namur may refer to:

- Robert of Namur (died 981), count of the Lommegau
- Robert of Namur (1323–1391), a noble from the Low Countries close to King Edward III of England
