= Gerard I =

Gerard I or Gerhard I may refer to:

- Gerard I, Count of Guelders
- Gerard I of Isenburg-Kempenich
- Gerard I of Durbuy
- Gerhard I, Count of Holstein-Itzehoe

== See also ==
- Girard I of Roussillon
