= Jean de Hocsem =

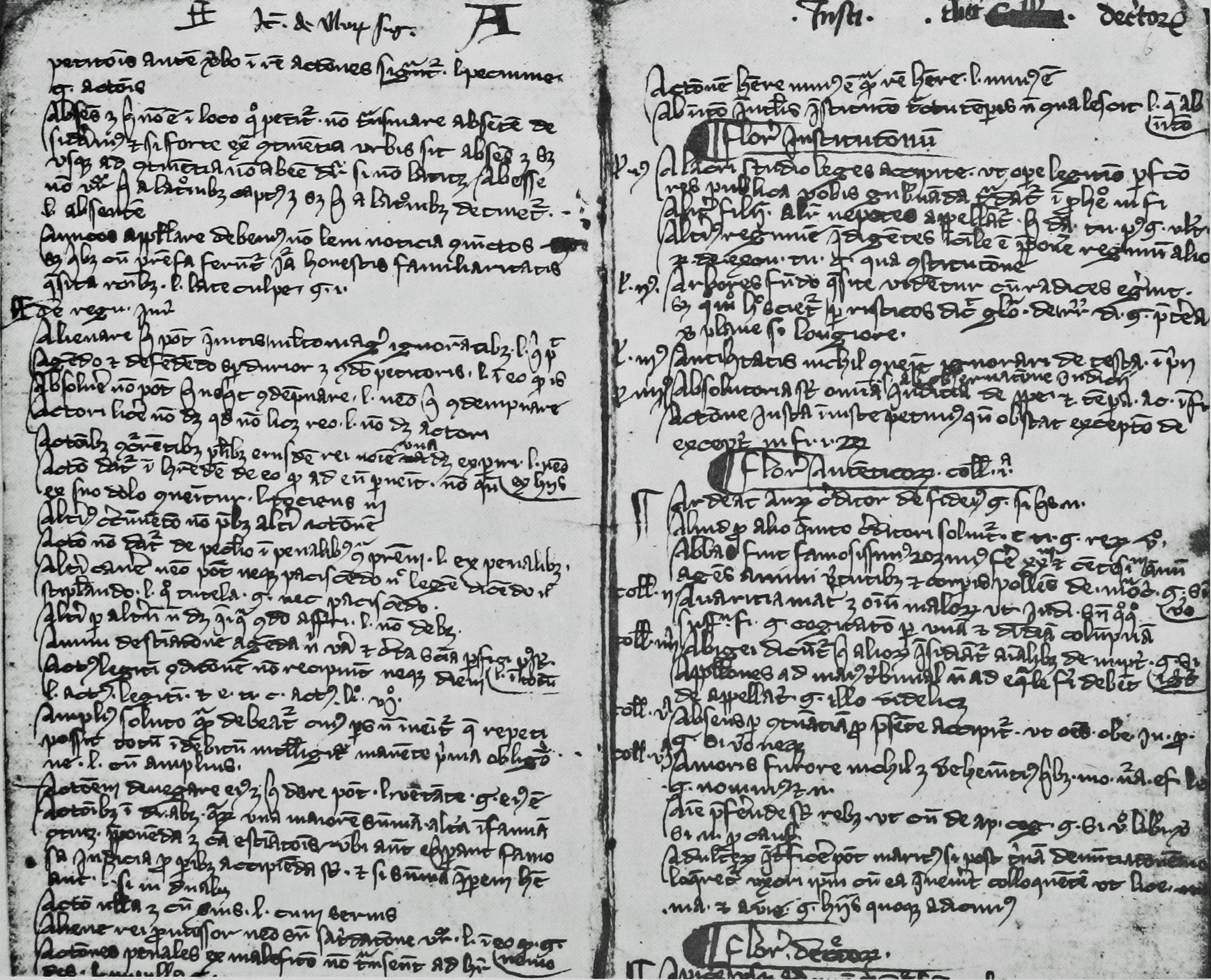
Digitus florum utriusque iuris, 1341

Jean de Hocsem or Jan van Hocsem, Latinized Johannes Hocsemius (1278–1348), was a canon and scholaster of Saint Lambert's Cathedral, Liège.

He was the author of the Gesta episcoporum Leodiensium, a history of the bishops of Liège from 1247 to 1347, the original manuscript of which is now in the Royal Library of Belgium in Brussels. It is one of the major sources for the history of the War of the Cow. A second manuscript survives in the library of Averbode Abbey. A critical edition of the chronicle by Godefroid Kurth was published in 1927 under the title La chronique de Jean de Hocsem.

In 1341, he wrote a book about canon law, Digitus florum utriusque iuris, one copy of which, in the National Archives (RHCL) in Maastricht, is partly in his own hand.
