= Henry I of Durbuy =

Henry I, Count of Durbuy
- Count of Durbuy
- Reign: Unknown–1097
- Successor: Godefroi, Count of Durbuy
- Died: 1097; Jerusalem
- Noble family: House of Namur
- Issue: Godefroi, Count of Durbuy
- Father: Albert II, Count of Namur
- Mother: Regilende, daughter of Gothelo I

Henry I (died 1097), Count of Durbuy, son of Albert II, Count of Namur, and Regilende, daughter of Gothelo I, Count of Verdun and Duke of Lorraine.

Emperor Henry IV confirmed donations made by Henry to Saint James's Church, Liège, as witnessed by Giselbert II, Count of Duras. Henry participated in the First Crusade and died in Jerusalem in 1097.

Henry was married, but the name of his wife is unknown. They had one child:

- Godefroi, Count of Durbuy

Upon his death, Henry was succeeded as Count of Durbuy by his son Godefroi.

== Sources ==
- Gade, John A., Luxembourg in the Middle Ages, Brill, 1951
- Terre de Durbuy, catalogue d'exposition, Durbuy, Halle aux Blés, Ministère de la Communauté française, Direction générale des Arts et des Lettres, Administration du Patrimoine Culturel, 1982
