= Jesse (bishop of Amiens) =

Frankish Catholic prelate

Titlepage of Jesse's copy of Jerome's Against Jovinianus with Jesse's name at the bottom

Jesse was a Frankish prelate and diplomat who served as the bishop of Amiens from 799 to 836, with a brief interruption between 830 and 833. He was a politically involved bishop during the reign of Charlemagne, but his role declined under Louis the Pious after 814.

== Life ==
Jesse was born into a noble Frankish family. He studied with Alcuin of York, which recommended him to Charlemagne. He was the head deacon at the court in Aachen before he was made bishop. His predecessor at Amiens, George, consecrated the main altar of Saint-Riquier Abbey in 798 or early 799. On 4 September, Jesse consecrated the altar dedicated to Raphael in the north portal.

=== Charlemagne's envoy ===
Jesse accompanied Pope Leo III on his return to Rome from Saxony in 799. He accompanied Charlemagne to Rome for his imperial coronation in November 800. In 802–803, he was in Constantinople as Charlemagne's ambassador to the Byzantine Empire. He set out on his mission with Count Helmgaud in April 802. According to Theophanes the Confessor, one of the matters for this embassy was the proposed marriage of Charlemagne and the Empress Irene. Jesse and Helmgaud never met the empress. Their ship lay at anchor in the Bosphorus when she was deposed in a palace coup in October. They returned the following spring with a Byzantine ambassador and the draft of a peace treaty.

In 808, Jesse was sent as a missus dominicus (royal emissary) to Ravenna. In a letter to the emperor, Pope Leo objected to this appointment, calling Jesse "unsuitable" for the job or to be a royal counsellor. Jesse attended the Council of Aachen (809). In 810, he was one of Charlemagne's envoys, along with Bernar of Worms and Adalard of Corbie, sent to discuss the filioque controversy with the pope, probably because he was regarded as an expert in eastern affairs.

In 811, Jesse was one of the witnesses of Charlemagne's testament.

=== Louis's opponent ===
Jesse either withdrew or was excluded from high politics after the accession of Charlemagne's son, Louis, in 814. He attended the synod of Noyon (814) and the synod of Paris (829). In 830, he was one of the leaders of a rebellion against Louis. According to Odbertus, it was Jesse who officiated when the captive empress Judith was forced to become a nun. The emperor soon gained the upper hand. A tribunal of bishops held at Nijmegen in the autumn of 830 under the presidency of Archbishop Ebbo deposed Jesse from his bishopric. Although he was covered by the general pardon issued by Louis in the spring of 831, he seems to have been restored as bishop only after Louis's deposition in 833. Thegan of Trier, biographer and partisan of Louis, criticizes Ebbo harshly for his role in both episodes: "You, with the judgement of others, deposed Jesse from the priesthood, but now you have recalled him to his former rank. Either then or now you showed false judgement."

On 28 February 834, following Louis's restoration, Jesse went into internal exile to the Italian kingdom of Louis's eldest son Lothair. Jesse died in Italy in the autumn of 836 or 837, the year being uncertain. He was the victim of an epidemic that also took the lives of Wala of Corbie, Hugh of Tours and Matfrid of Orléans. The author of the Vita Hludovici attributes his death, between early September and Martinmas (11 November), to the judgement of God.

== Works ==
The Epistula de baptismo, an encyclical letter on baptism, was written by Jesse to the clergy of his diocese. This letter may be related to Charlemagne's own encyclical on the topic, written in 811 or 812. It has, however, also been dated about a decade earlier, around 802.

The manuscript Bamberg, Staatliche Bibliothek, Patr. 86 (B.V.13) bears an inscription identifying its original owner as Jesse. According to E. A. Lowe, the bishop probably made use of this manuscript when writing his Epistula de baptismo. Another manuscript probably owned by Jesse is the Gospels of Sainte-Croix (Poitiers, Médiathèque François Mitterrand, 17).

== Works cited ==
- Cabaniss, Allen (1972). Charlemagne. Twayne Publishers.
- Depreux, Philippe (1997). Prosopographie de l'entourage de Louis le Pieux (781–840) (PDF). Sigmaringen: Jan Thorbecke.
- Duchesne, Louis (1915). Fastes épiscopaux de l'ancienne Gaule. Vol. 3. E. de Boccard.
- Favier, Jean (1999). Charlemagne. France Loisirs.
- Fried, Johannes (2016) [2013]. Charlemagne. Translated by Peter Lewis. Harvard University Press.
- Hägermann, Dieter (2011) [2000]. Carlo Magno: Il signore dell'Occidente. Translated by Giuseppe Albertoni. Arnoldo Mondadori Editore.
- Herbert, Lynley Anne (2012). Lux Vita: The Majesty and Humanity of Christ in the Gospels of Sainte-Croix of Poitiers (PhD dissertation). University of Delaware. ProQuest 3526426
- Herbert, Lynley Anne (2025). "A Tale of Two Tables: Echoes of the Past in the Canons of the Sainte-Croix Gospels". In David Vopřada; Markéta Dudziková; Viacheslav V. Lytvynenko (eds.). The Pattern and the Image: Insights from the Alexandrian Exegetical Tradition. De Gruyter. pp. 173–191.
- Keefe, Susan (2002). Water and the Word: Baptism and the Education of the Clergy in the Carolingian Empire. University of Notre Dame Press.
- McKitterick, Rosamond (2008). Charlemagne: The Formation of a European Identity. Cambridge University Press.
- Minois, Georges (2014). Charlemagne. Perrin.
- Mioland, Jean-Marie (1848). Actes de l'église d'Amiens: recueil de tous les documents relatifs à la discipline du diocèse, de l'an 811 à l'an 1848. Vol. 1. Caron et Lambert.
- Nelson, Janet L. (2019). King and Emperor: A New Life of Charlemagne. Penguin.
- Noble, T. F. X., ed. (2009). Charlemagne and Louis the Pious: The Lives by Einhard, Notker, Ermoldus, Thegan and the Astronomer. Pennsylvania State University Press.
- Phelan, Owen M. (2008). "Textual Transmission and Authorship in Carolingian Europe: Primo Paganus, Baptism, and Alcuin of York". Revue Bénédictine. 118 (2): 262–288. doi:10.1484/J.RB.5.100572.
- Scholz, Bernhard Walter, ed. (1970). Carolingian Chronicles: Royal Frankish Annals and Nithard's Histories. University of Michigan Press.
- Soyez, Edmond (1878). Notices sur les évêques d'Amiens. Langlois.
- Thompson, Kathleen, ed. (2024). Hariulf's History of St Riquier. Manchester University Press.
