= Gospels of Sainte-Croix =

Christ in Majesty

The Sainte-Croix Gospels (or Gospels of Sainte-Croix of Poitiers) is an illuminated gospel book produced around 800 in northern France. It was acquired by the Abbey of Sainte-Croix in Poitiers by the 10th century and is today the oldest manuscript in the collection of the Médiathèque François-Mitterrand in Poitiers, where it is MS 17 (65)—or Poitiers 17 for short.

The Sainte-Croix Gospels contains 214 leaves of parchment and measures 31 by 23 centimetres (12.2 in × 9.1 in). The first two leaves and the last have been lost. The text was copied in uncial script by a single anonymous scribe (except for a few short passages by a less capable scribe). The scribe is known to have copied at least three other manuscripts: Bamberg, Patr. 86 (B.V.13); Cambridge, Magdalene College, Pepysian 2981 (I); and Leiden, Voss. Lat. F. 26. Bernhard Bischoff places its production in Amiens, while Lynley Herbert argues for the scriptorium of Corbie Abbey. Like the Bamberg manuscript, the Sainte-Croix may have been created for Bishop Jesse of Amiens.

Preceding the text of the four canonical gospels in the Sainte-Croix Gospels are a series of ancillary texts: two sets of canon tables (an ancient table consisting of numbered lines of text and the more usual table placed within decorated arches), Eusebius's letter to Carpianus, Jerome's letter to Damasus and a poem on the harmony of the gospels by Ailerán. The second set of canon tables and the incipits of the gospels are richly decorated with gold, silver and blue pigments. A single full-page miniature introduces the gospels. It depicts Christ in Majesty surrounded by zoo-anthropomorphic Evangelist portraits, combining their symbolic animals with human forms and presenting their writings to Christ. Its unique style and composition have puzzled historians, making it the most remarked-upon feature of the Sainte-Croix Gospels.

== Works cited ==
- Bischoff, Bernhard (1994). Manuscripts and Libraries in the Age of Charlemagne. Cambridge University Press.
- Herbert, Lynley Anne (2012). Lux Vita: The Majesty and Humanity of Christ in the Gospels of Sainte-Croix of Poitiers (PhD dissertation). University of Delaware. ProQuest 3526426
- Herbert, Lynley Anne (2025). "A Tale of Two Tables: Echoes of the Past in the Canons of the Sainte-Croix Gospels". In David Vopřada; Markéta Dudziková; Viacheslav V. Lytvynenko (eds.). The Pattern and the Image: Insights from the Alexandrian Exegetical Tradition. De Gruyter. pp. 173–191.
