= Godefroi, Count of Durbuy =

Count of Durbuy

Godefroi (d. before 1124), Count of Durbuy, son of Henry I, Count of Durbuy.

Godefroi captured Otbert, Bishop of Liège, and imprisoned him in Durbuy. This presumably was related to the conflict between Otbert and Godfrey I the Bearded, Count of Louvain over the County of Brunengeruz, who Emperor Henry IV eventually entrusted to Albert III, Count of Namur. This is related to the dispute between Henry III of Luxembourg and Arnold I, Count of Looz, over the Abbey of Sint-Triuden.

Godefroi married Alix de Grandpré, daughter of Henri, Count of Grandpré and Porcien, and his wife Ermentrude de Joux, daughter of Conon "Falcon" Grandson. Ermentrude was the sister of Barthélemy de Jur, Bishop of Laon. Godefroi and Alix had three children:

- Richard I, Bishop of Verdun
- Henry II, Count of Durbuy
- Alix de Durbuy.

Upon his death, Godefroi was succeeded as Count of Durbuy by his son Henry. When Henry died, the countship of Durbuy transferred to his cousin, Henry the Blind, and subsequently to the family of the Dukes of Limburg.

== Sources ==
- Gade, John A., Luxembourg in the Middle Ages, Brill, 1951
- Terre de Durbuy, catalogue d'exposition, Durbuy, Halle aux Blés, Ministère de la Communauté française, Direction générale des Arts et des Lettres, Administration du Patrimoine Culturel, 1982
