= Robert II of Namur =

Robert II, Count of Namur
- Died: 1018–1031
- Noble family: House of Namur
- Father: Albert I, Count of Namur
- Mother: Ermengarde – daughter of Charles, Duke of Lower Lorraine

Robert II of Namur was count of Namur from the death of his father in 1011 to some time between 1018 and 1031. He was the son of Albert I, and Ermengarde, daughter of Charles, Duke of Lower Lorraine.

== Biography ==
He assisted his mother's brother-in-law, Lambert I, Count of Louvain in his fight against Baldrick II, Bishop of Liege in 1012.

In 1015, he participated in the Battle of Florennes where Lambert was killed. Although some researchers have said that Robert died in the same battle, he survived because he is again mentioned in 1018 in an imperial diploma.

Robert never married and had no issue. After his death, he was succeeded as count of Namur by his younger brother, Albert II.

== Notes ==
Robert II of Namur House of Namur Died: 1018-31
Preceded by Albert I	Count of Namur; 1010-1018?	Succeeded by Albert II
