= Gerard I of Durbuy =

Count of Durbuy from 1247 to 1298

Gérard I of Durbuy (c. 1223 – after 1298), was the Count of Durbuy from 1247 to his death. He was the second son of Waleran III of Limburg and Ermesinda of Luxembourg.

He married Mechthilde, daughter of Thierry of Cleves, Lord of Dinslaken, and Elisabeth of Brabant before 1259.

They had the following issue:

- Ermesinde (d. 1272), married to Gerhard V, Count of Blankenheim (d. after 1309)
- Catherine (d. September 26, 1328), married to 1) Albert, Lord of Voorne (d. 1287) and 2) Wolfart of Borsselen (d. 1289)
- Agnes
- Mary
- Mathilda, Lady of Melin, married to Henin of Fontaine-l'Évêque
- Pentecosta, married to William of Mortagne, Lord of Rumes (1268, d. 1302)
- Isabella, Lady of Roussy, married to Henry II of Grandpré Lord of Houffalize and Livry
- Margret (d. 1291), married to John II Lord of Ghistelles (d. 1315).

Gérard was the last count of Durbuy, the position transitioning to Emperor Henry VII after his death.

Preceded by Ermesinda	Count of Durbuy; 1247–after 1298	Succeeded by Henry VII
