= Albert II of Namur =

Count of Namur (died 1067)

Albert II, Count of Namur
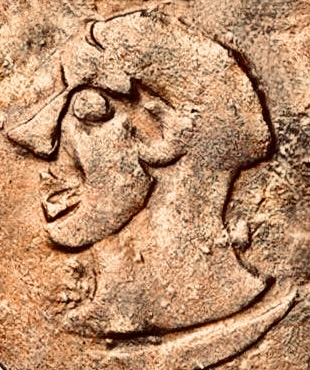
- Died: 1067
- Noble family: House of Namur
- Spouse: Regelinde – daughter of Gothelo I, Count of Verdun and Duke of Lorraine
- Issue: Albert III, Count of Namur; Henry I, Count of Durbuy; Hedwige of Namur
- Father: Albert I, Count of Namur
- Mother: Ermengarde – daughter of Charles, Duke of Lower Lorraine

Albert II of Namur was Count of Namur from the death of his elder brother Robert II to his death in 1067. They were the sons of Albert I, and Ermengarde, daughter of duke Charles of Lower Lorraine.

== Biography ==
In 1037, Albert participated in the Battle of Bar-le-Duc against Odo II, Count of Blois, who was seeking to claim for himself the inheritance of his uncle, Rudolph III of Burgundy, which in 1032 had passed to Conrad II and been incorporated into the Holy Roman Empire. In 1046, Albert supported Emperor Henry III in his fight against Godfrey III, Duke of Lower Lorraine, and Baldwin V, Count of Flanders.

In 1047, he founded the collegiate church of St. Albinus at Namur, which became Namur cathedral in 1559.

== Marriages and issue ==
Between 1010 and 1015 Albert married Regelinde (d. 1067) daughter of Gothelo I, Count of Verdun and Duke of Lorraine and had the following issue:

- Albert III (c. 1027–1102)
- Henry I, Count of Durbuy (d. 1097 in Palestine)
- Hedwige of Namur, married Gerard, Duke of Lorraine

== Sources ==
- Borgnet, Jules (1866). Biographie Nationale. Brussels: Académie Royale de Belgique. pp. 196–197.
- Gislebertus (of Mons) (2005). Chronicle of Hainaut. Translated by Napran, Laura. The Boydell Press.
- Tanner, Heather J. (1992). "The Expansion of the Power and Influence of the Counts of Boulogne under Eustace II". In Chibnall, Marjorie (ed.). Proceedings of the Battle Conference 1991. The Boydell Press.

Albert II of Namur House of Namur Died: 1067
Preceded by Robert II	Count of Namur; 1016-1067	Succeeded by Albert III
