= Reginar (died 818) =

Reginar (Reginhere) (died 17 April 818), Frankish nobleman, son of Meginhere, confidant of Charlemagne, and grandson of the conspirator Hardrad.

== Biography ==
Reginar allied himself with Bernard, King of Italy, grandson of Charlemagne. In 817, Louis the Pious issued the Ordinatio Imperii that detailed the future of the Frankish Empire. Under this, the bulk of the Frankish territory went to Louis' eldest son, Lothair. Bernard received no further territory beyond th kingship of Italy, and he was to be a vassal of Lothair. This was likely the handiwork of Empress Ermengarde, who wanted to displace Bernard in favor of her sons.

Bernard began plotting with a group of noblemen including the king’s friend Eggideo, the chamberlain Reginhard, and Reginar. Anshelm, Bishop of Milan and Theodulf, Bishop of Orléans, were also accused of being involved.

The rebels planned to dethrone Louis, putting him and his family to death, and to install Bernard as sole ruler of the Empire. Ratbold, Bishop of Verona, and Suppo, Count of Brescia, were among the first to warn Louis of the plot, reporting the belief that all of Italy would support the insurgents. Louis himself led his troops at Châlon, where Bernard and his chief partisans, ill-supported, quickly surrendered.

The conspirators were sent to Aix-la-Chapelle, where the town assembly sentenced all to death. The Emperor commuted their punishment to that of blinding. Both Bernard and Reginar died, on 17 April 818, just a few days after their punishment. Further details can be found in the article Bernard of Italy.

== Sources ==
- Bury, J. B. (Editor), The Cambridge Medieval History, Volume III: Germany and the Western Empire, Cambridge University Press, Cambridge, 1922, pages 11–12
- McKitterick, Rosamond (Editor), The New Cambridge Medieval History, Volume II: 700-900, Cambridge University Press, Cambridge, 1991, pages 113–115
