= Robert I of Namur =

Robrecht or Robert I of Namur (d. before 981) was a 10th-century count of Namur in what is now Belgium.

During his lifetime his jurisdiction came to be referred to by the name of the fortification of Namur, which was built upon a rocky prominence where the Sambre and Meuse rivers join. Previously the main name given to the core territory under his jurisdiction was the pagus or gau of Lomme.

Robert's parents are unknown but it is possible he was a son or close relative of Count Berengar who had ruled Lomme from Namur before him. This Berengar was reported by Flodoard to have married a daughter of Reginar I.

Robrecht came into conflict with the archbishop Bruno the Great, who was also Duke of Lotharingia. He ignored Bruno's edict that required him to demolish the defences he had built without permission from the duke. The identity of Robrecht's wife is unknown. He was father of:

- Albert I (d. 1011)
- Giselbert
- Ratboud
