= List of counts and margraves of Namur =

Coat of arms of the counts and margraves of Namur.

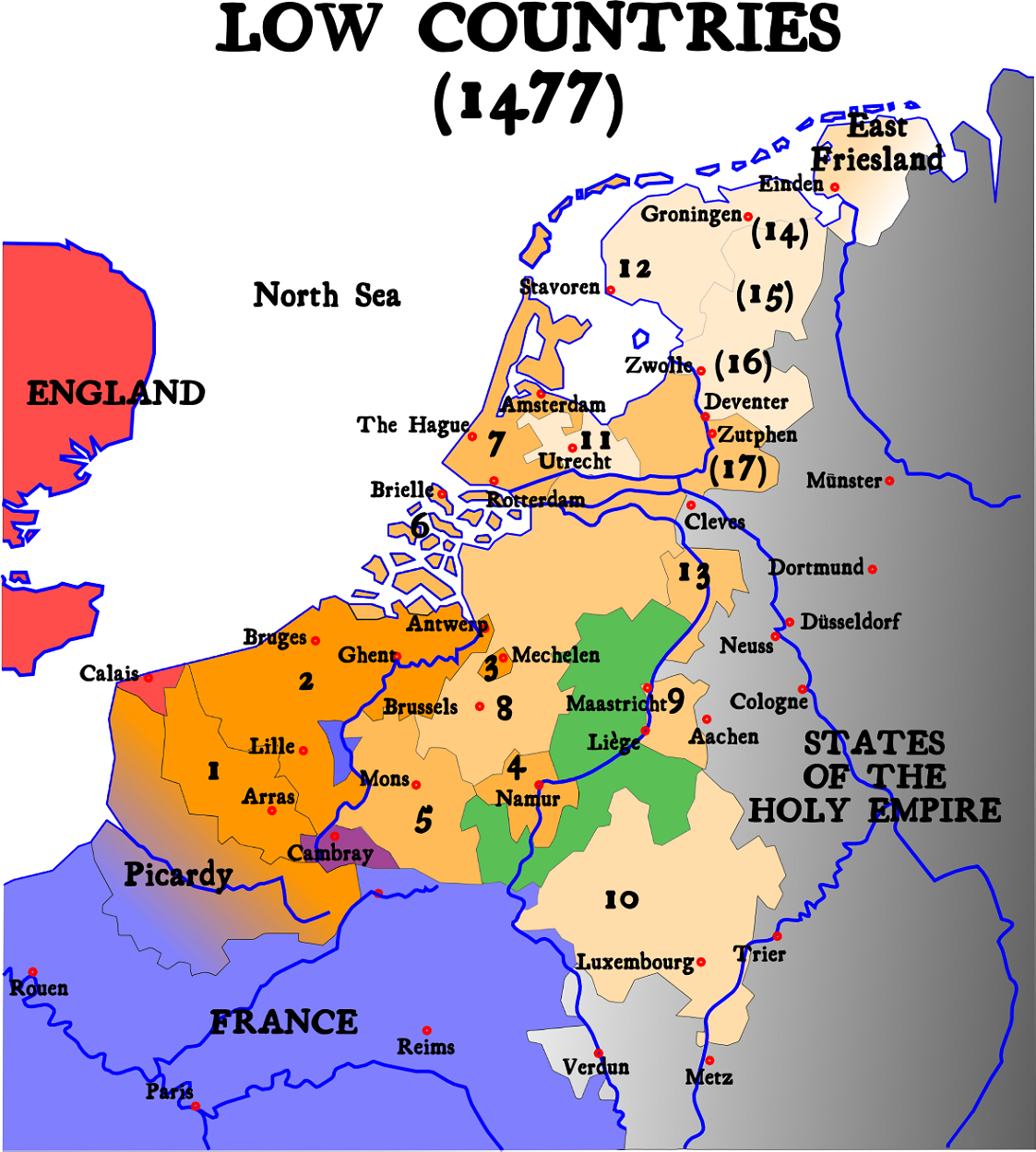
A map of the Low Countries in 1477. The County of Namur is numbered 4.

The County of Namur was not often an independent state, rather under the dominion of other entities like the counties of Hainaut and Flanders or the Duchy of Burgundy.

Succession is from father to son, unless otherwise noted.

== Counts ==
=== House of Namur ===
- Robert I (r. 946 – 981)
- Albert I (r. 992 – 1010)
- Robert II (r. 1010 – 1018?)
- Albert II (r. 1018? – 1067)
- Albert III (r. 1067 – 1102)
- Godfrey I (r. 1102 – 1139)
- Henry I the Blind (r. 1139 – 1189)
  - Alice, sister of, married Baldwin IV, Count of Hainaut

== Margraves ==
=== House of Flanders ===
- Baldwin I (r. 1189 – 1195), nephew of
- Philip I (r. 1195 – 1212)
- Yolanda (r.1212 – 1216), sister of, also Empress of the Latin Empire as Yolanda I, married Peter II of Courtenay

=== House of Courtenay ===
- Philip II (r. 1216 – 1226)
- Henry II (r. 1226 – 1229), brother of
- Margaret (r. 1229 – 1237), sister of
- Baldwin II (r. 1237 – 1256), brother of, also Emperor of the Latin Empire as Baldwin II

=== House of Luxembourg ===
- Henry III (r. 1256 – 1265), grand son of Henry I the Blind. By force.

=== House of Dampierre ===
- Guy I (r. 1265 – 1297). Bought the county from his cousin Baldwin II and chased Henry III.
- John I (r. 1297 – 1330)
- John II (r. 1330 – 1335)
- Guy II (r. 1335 – 1336), brother of
- Philip III (r. 1336 – 1337), brother of
- William I (r. 1337 – 1391), brother of
- William II (r. 1391 – 1418)
- John III (r. 1418 – 1421; died 1429), brother of

In 1421, John III sells his estates to Philip the Good, Duke of Burgundy.

=== House of Valois-Burgundy ===
- 1429-1467 - Philip IV the Good
- 1467-1477 : Charles I the Bold
- 1477-1482 : Mary I the Rich, daughter of, married

=== House of Habsburg ===
- 1493-1519 : Maximilian, husband of, also Emperor of the Holy Roman Empire as Maximilian I
- 1519-1556 : Charles II, grandson, also Emperor of the Holy Roman Empire as Charles V

Charles V proclaimed the Pragmatic Sanction of 1549 eternally uniting Namur with the other lordships of the Low Countries in a personal union. When the Habsburg empire was divided among the heirs of Charles V, the Low Countries, including Namur, went to Philip II of Spain, of the Spanish branch of the House of Habsburg.

- 1556-1598 : Philip V, also King of Spain as Philip II
- 1598-1621 : Isabella Clara Eugenia, daughter of, married Albert, Archduke of Austria)
- 1621-1665 : Philip VI, half brother of, also King of Spain as Philip IV
- 1665-1700 : Charles III, also King of Spain as Charles II

Between 1706 and 1714 Namur was invaded by the English and the Dutch during the War of the Spanish Succession. The fief was claimed by the House of Habsburg and the House of Bourbon. In 1712 Luxembourg and Namur were ceded to Maximilian II Emanuel, Elector of Bavaria by his French allies, but with the end of the war in 1713 with the Treaty of Utrecht Max. Emanuel was restored as Elector of Bavaria. The Treaty of Utrecht also settled the succession, and the Margraviate of Namur went to the Austrian branch of the House of Habsburg, along with the rest of the Spanish Netherlands.

- 1714-1740 : Charles IV, great grandson of Philip III
- 1740-1780 : Mary II Theresa, daughter of, married Francis I
- 1780-1790 : Joseph I, also Emperor of the Holy Roman Empire as Joseph II

The title was factually abolished in the aftermath of the French Revolution and the annexation of Namur by France in 1795. However, the title remained officially claimed by the descendants of Leopold II until the reign of Karl I of Austria.

- 1790-1792 : Leopold, brother of, also Emperor of the Holy Roman Empire as Leopold II
- 1792-1835 : Francis II, also Emperor of the Holy Roman Empire as Francis II
- 1835-1848 : Ferdinand, also Emperor of Austria as Ferdinand I
- 1848-1916 : Francis III Joseph, grandson of Francis II, also Emperor of Austria as Francis Joseph I
