= Albert I of Namur =

Count of Namur (died 1011)

Albert I (died ca. 1011) the son of Robert I, was a count who held the castle of Namur and a county in the Lommegau. His county came to be referred to as the County of Namur in records during his lifetime.

Albert married Ermengarde, daughter of Charles, Duke of Lower Lorraine, and had:

- Robert II, Count of Namur died without issue
- Albert II, Count of Namur was father of Hedwige of Namur, who married Gerard, Duke of Lorraine.

There are some doubts about the correct list of his daughters, as there are two very different lists given in two primary documents.

The "Genealogia ex Stirpe Sancti Arnulfi" lists:

- Count Albert
- Hadewide
- Emma of Looz

The "Vita Arnulfi Episcopi Suessioniensis" lists (as siblings of one of the Counts named Albert of Namur, whose parents are not named):

- Count Albert
- Ludgarde mother of Emmon Count of Looz, and his brother Otto.
- Goda
- Ermengarde

A 3rd relevant source is the Gesta of Sint-Truiden Abbey which also named Countess Ermengarde having a daughter named Lutgarde who married a Count Otto of Loon and was mother to Bishop Balderic II of Liège, brother of Count Giselbert of Loon. As Jean Baerten and other authors have pointed out, this is chronologically impossible, though it is possible Lutgarde could be mother of Emmo and Otto.

Ludgarde and Emma, both with a connection to Looz, are sometimes therefore thought to represent a garbled account of the same person.

== Sources ==
- Bachrach, Bernard S.; Bachrach, David S.; Leese, Michael, eds. (2018). Deeds of the Bishops of Cambrai, Translation and Commentary. Routledge.
- Tanner, Heather J. (1992). Chibnall, Marjorie (ed.). "The Expansion of the Power and Influence of the Counts of Boulogne under Eustace II". Anglo-Norman Studies - XIV.Proceeding of the Battle Conference 1991. The Boydell Press: 251–286.
