= Hardrad =

Hardrad (died after 786) was a Frankish count and a leading figure in the conspiracy of Thuringian noblemen against Charlemagne. This conspiracy resulted in many nobles being killed and their property confiscated, leading to the laws concerning the subdued Saxons established in the Diet of Aix of 802-803. Hardrad was a member of the Eastern Frankish aristocracy with extensive land assets and good relations with the Monastery of Fulda, and was likely related to the abbot, Baugulf von Fulda. Little is known about the life of Count Hardrad, even from contemporary Frankish sources. In 771, the Cartulary of Lorraine, Abbey Gorze, identified a deceased Hardrad, father of Ratard (Rothard of the Argengau, father of Welf I of Bavaria), who could have been the father or grandfather of the younger Hardrad. It is the same with two other occurrences, one of which is in 746 in Echternach and the other in 721 in Prüm, in which Bertrada of Laon and her father Charibert, the maternal grandfather of Charlemagne, are mentioned.

The uprising of 786 supported by Hardrad was one of two during Charlemagne's reign, the second being that of his son Pepin the Hunchback in 792, and both seemed to be associated with Charlemagne's marriage to Fastrada, as attested by Einhard. Some members of the court called for a marriage by Thüringer customary law, but Charlemagne opted for a marriage under Frankish law. Accordingly, Hardrad conspired with numerous other Thuringian nobles against the emperor, as suggested by the Annales Nazariani, an East Frankish source.

This view is regarded by many historians as poetic exaggeration. The background of the conspiracy is rather the introduction of the Carolingian imperial order in Thuringia, with the form of marriage rather trifling. Evidence for Hardrad's actions are mentioned in a revised edition of the Royal Frankish Annals for the year 785. Almost no other first-hand sources reference Hardrad directly, or suggest what his motivations or plans were for the revolt, with historians suggesting general aristocratic dissatisfaction with Charlemagne's rule as a potential motive, though this is based completely in conjecture, and lacks an explanation for the Thuringian character of the revolt.

In response, the emperor sent troops to Thuringia to ravage the possessions of the rebels, who fled to the monastery of Fulda. Charlemagne ordered the rebels to his court. Hardrad submitted as justification for refusing allegiance was that he had never sworn allegiance. The emperor had the conspirators expelled and the goods and lands confiscated, with the blinding of rebel lords used as further punishment, suggesting a powerful response from Charlemagne.

Hardrad was married to an unknown woman and they had a least two daughters, both unnamed, one of whom married the Frankish count Meginhare. Meginhare's son Reginar, following in his grandfather's tradition, conspired against Louis the Pious, resulting in his blinding and death.

== Sources ==
- Turner, Samuel Epes (Translator), Einhard: The Life of Charlemagne, Harper & Brothers, New York, 1880, reprinted by the University of Michigan Press in 1960 with a copyrighted foreword by Sidney Painter
- Thorpe, Lewis G. M., Two Lives of Charlemagne, Penguin, 1969, page 90 and footnote 106
