= Reginar Longneck =

Lotharingian noble (c. 850–915)

- Born: c. 850
- Died: c. 915
- Noble family: House of Reginar
- Spouses: Hersinda; Alberada
- Issue: Gilbert, Duke of Lorraine; Reginar II, Count of Hainaut; Frederick, Archbishop of Mainz
- Father: probably Giselbertus
- Mother: Unknown

Reginar Longneck or Reginar I (c. 850–915), Latin: Rainerus or Ragenerus Longicollus, was a leading nobleman in the kingdom of Lotharingia, variously described in contemporary sources with the titles of count, margrave, missus dominicus and duke. He stands at the head of a Lotharingian dynasty known to modern scholarship as the Reginarids, because of their frequent use of the name "Reginar".

== Background ==
Reginar was probably the son of Giselbertus, comes of the Maasgau, and a daughter of Lothair I whose name is not known (Hiltrude, Bertha, Irmgard, and Gisela are candidate names). In an 877 charter in the Capitulary of Quierzy, he possibly already appears as "Rainerus", alongside his probable father as one of the regents of the kingdom during Charles the Bald's absence on campaign in Italy.

== Career ==
Reginar was lay abbot of important abbeys stretching from the Meuse (Dutch: Maas) to the Moselle through the Ardennes, Saint-Servais in Maastricht, Echternach, Stavelot-Malmedy, and Saint-Maximin in Trier. All these abbeys lay on or near the boundary negotiated between the Eastern and Western Frankish kingdoms in the Treaty of Meerssen in 870, during a period when the Western Kingdom controlled much of Lotharingia. In Echternach, he was referred to as "Rainerus iunior" because the lay abbot before him, a probable relative, had the same name.

Reginar's secular titles and activities are mainly only known from much later sources which are considered to be of uncertain reliability. Dudo of Saint-Quentin, in describing the great deeds of the early Normans, calls Reginar I (who, along with a prince of the Frisians named Radbod, was an opponent of Rollo, the founder of Normandy) a duke of both Hainaut and Hesbaye. Centuries later William of Jumièges, and then later still, Alberic de Trois Fontaines followed Dudo using the same titles when describing the same events. He was variously referred to as duke, count, marquis, missus dominicus, but historians doubt that these titles were connected to a particular territory. That he called himself a duke is known from a charter at Stavelot 21 July 905, but this was during a period when Gebhard was duke of Lotharingia.

Reginar was originally a supporter of Zwentibold (King of Lotharingia) in 895, but he broke with the king in 898. He and some other magnates who had been key to Zwentibold's election three years earlier then took the opportunity provided by the death of Odo of France to invite Charles the Simple to become king in Lotharingia. His lands were confiscated, but he refused to give them up and entrenched himself at Durfost, downstream from Maastricht. Representatives of Charles, Zwentibold, and the Emperor Arnulf met at Sankt Goar and determined that the succession should go to Louis the Child. Zwentibold was killed by Reginar in battle in August 900.

Louis appointed Gebhard as his duke in Lotharingia. In 908, Reginar recuperated Hainaut after the death of Sigard. Then, after the death of Gebhard in 910, in battle with the Magyars, Reginar led the magnates in opposing Conrad I of Germany and electing Charles the Simple as their king. He never appears as the duke of Lorraine, but he was probably the military commander of the region under Charles. He was succeeded by his son Gilbert; however, the Reginarids did not succeed in establishing their supremacy in Lotharingia like the Liudolfings or Liutpoldings did in the duchies of Saxony and Bavaria.

== Family ==
By his wife Alberada, who predeceased him and was probably a second wife, Reginar left the following children:

- Gilbert, Duke of Lorraine
- Reginar II, Count of Hainaut
- a daughter, who married Berengar, Count of Namur

== Sources ==
- Reuter, Timothy. Germany in the Early Middle Ages 800–1056. New York: Longman, 1991.
- Reuter, Timothy (trans.) The Annals of Fulda. (Manchester Medieval series, Ninth-Century Histories, Volume II.) Manchester: Manchester University Press, 1992.
- Jean Baptiste David. Manuel de l'histoire de Belgique Vanlinthout, (1853) pp. 171 et seq. (in French)
- Parisot, Robert (1898), Le Royaume de Lorraine sous les Carolingiens also on google books.
- Ernst (1857), "Mémoire historique et critique sur les comtes de Hainaut de la première race", Bulletin de la Commission royale d'Histoire, 9: 393–513
