= Condroz =

Natural region of eastern Belgium

Coordinates: 50.3°N 5.0°E

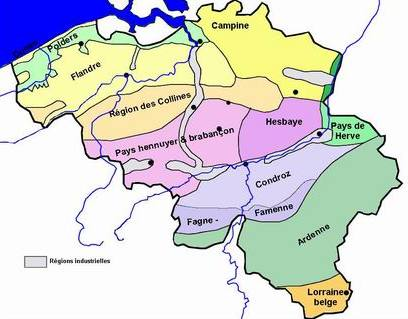
The natural regions of Belgium Condroz

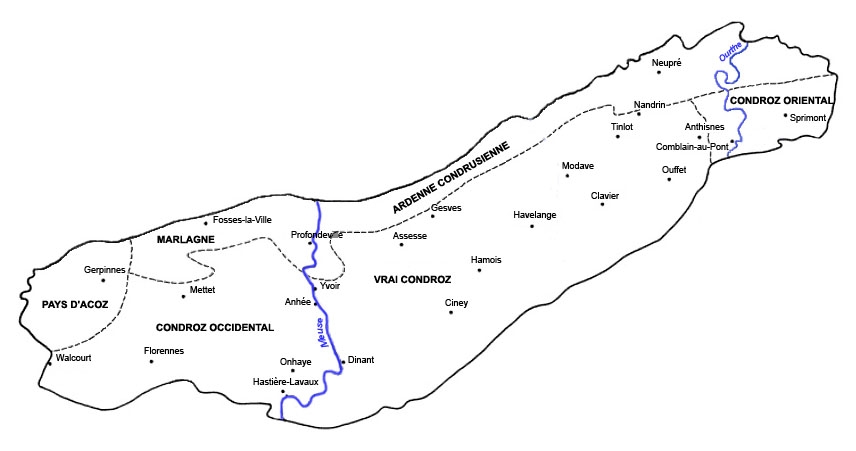
Sub-regions of the Condroz

The Condroz (French pronunciation: [kɔ̃dʁo]) is a natural region in Wallonia, the French-speaking part of Belgium, located between the Ardennes and the Meuse. Its unofficial capital is Ciney. The region preserves the name of the Condrusi, a Germanic tribe which inhabited the area during and before the Roman era.

Compared to other parts of Belgium, the Condroz is a sparsely populated, agricultural area. It consists of low hills of an average altitude of about 200 to 300 meters (660 to 980 ft). It is mainly situated in the provinces of Liège and Namur and also in smaller parts of the Belgian provinces of Hainaut and Luxembourg. It is bordered in the north by the Meuse river, in the east by the Ardennes, in the south by the Famenne region.

Historically, the Condroz did not stretch west of the Meuse, but today there is a western section, south of Namur and the Sambre river stretching to the Thiérache and southern Hainaut.

== History ==
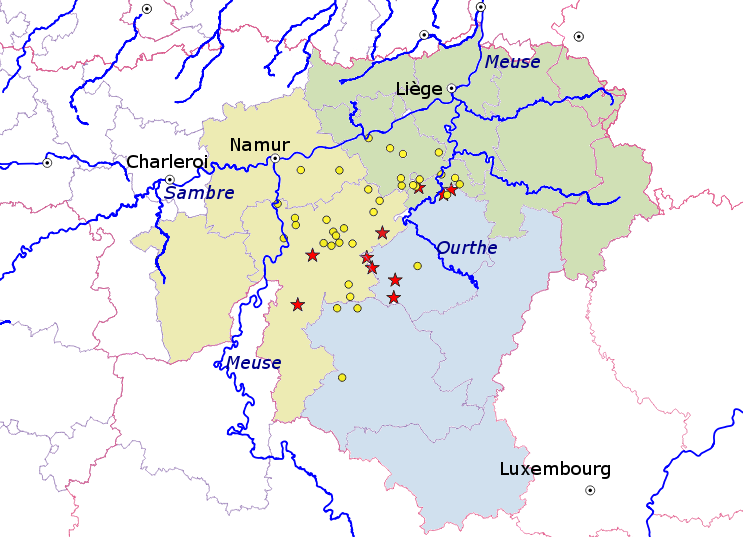
Southern Belgium, showing the early medieval places recorded as being in the Pagus Condrustis and the Falminna (Famenne). The yellow dots are in the Pagus Condrustis (medieval Condroz) and the red stars are in the Famenne. The modern province of Namur is in yellow.

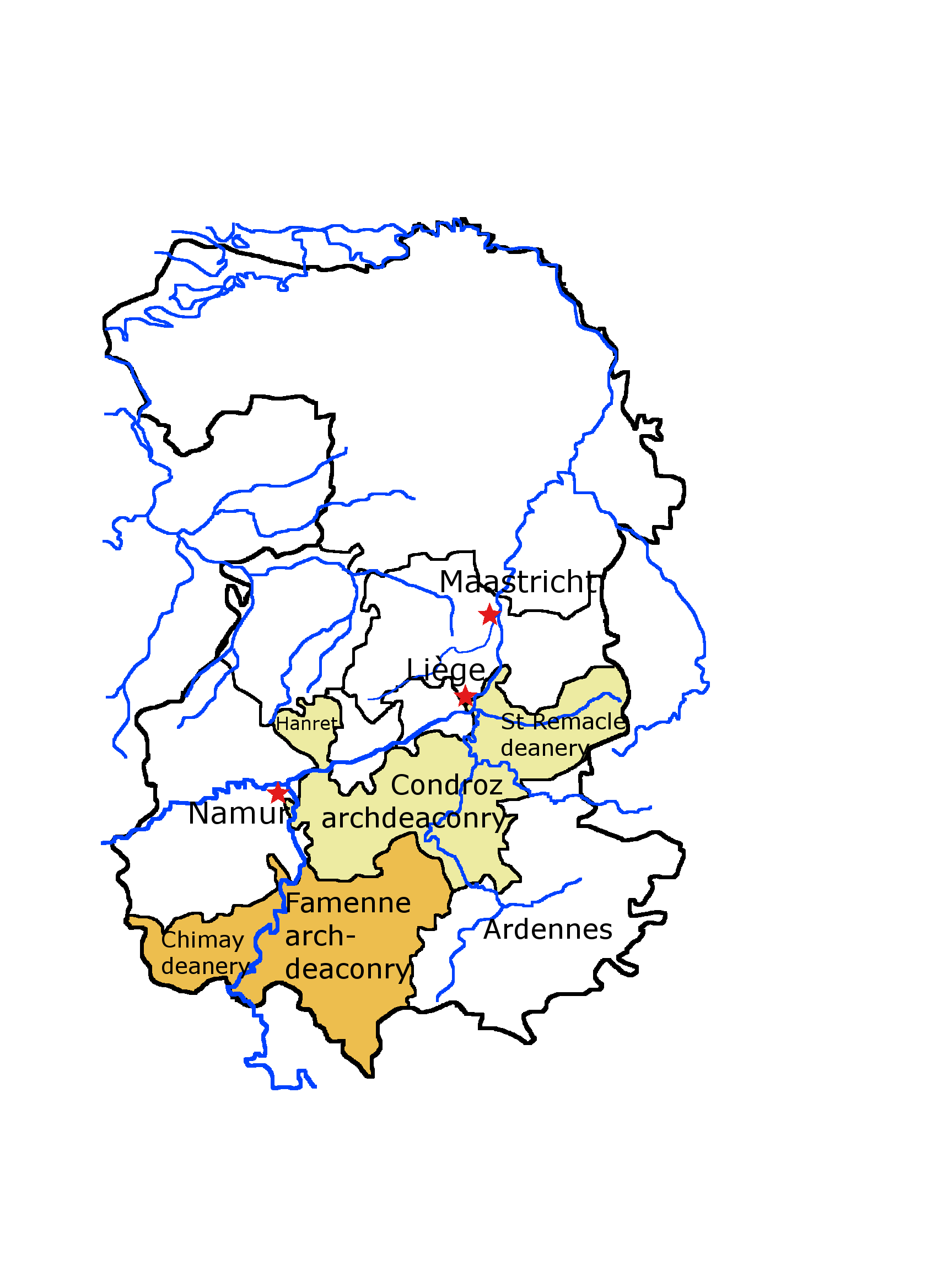
Late medieval catholic jurisdictions of Condroz and Famenne

Very little is known of the Roman era Condrusi, after whom the region was originally named. Julius Caesar described them and the Segni as living between the Eburones, to their north, and the Treviri, who lived to their south in the area of what is now Arlon, Luxembourg and the Moselle region in modern Germany and France.

From the fragmentary evidence it is known that citizens of the pagus or country of the Condrusi lived within the larger civitas of the Tungri, the Civitas Tungrorum, which had its capital in Tongeren. They fought in the Roman military and could earn Roman citizenship.

In medieval records, the Pagus Condrustis or Condrustensis started to appear again from 747, in an area consistent with the old country of the Condrusi mentioned by Caesar. For the Christian church, Condroz was part of the Bishopric of Liège, which managed a region corresponding to the old Roman Civitas Tungrorum, though the capital had now moved from Tongeren to Liège.

Unlike today, the medieval Condroz did not extend west over the Meuse river, into what is now the Belgian region Entre-Sambre-et-Meuse, because this was part of the medieval Lommegau or Pagus Lomacensis.

To the south, the Famenne region, which is today considered distinct from the Condroz, was originally a part of the Condroz. South of the Famenne region is and was rougher and more wooded terrain of the Ardennes, which today stretches into France and Luxembourg. In 839, the Carolingian Emperor Louis the Pious granted the "county" of Condroz and the county of the Ardennes to his son Louis the German, effectively making the Meuse the boundary between the eastern and western Frankish kingdoms. (This is the only time the Condroz was described as a county like this.)

To the east, the medieval Condroz stretched over the Ourthe. In 870 this area was specifically described in the Treaty of Meerssen, when the Condroz was allocated for some decades to the kingdom of the western Franks (from which France evolved).

As a church jurisdiction under Liège, already in about 800 the Pagus Condrustinsus was mentioned as one of only four divisions of the bishopric, along with Lomme, the Ardennes, and the Hesbaye. By 1497 the medieval jurisdictions, which were reformed in 1559, an archdeaconry of the Famenne had been created from the southern part (together with the Chimay deanery from the Lomme pagus west of the Meuse). In at least two significant ways, the late medieval archdeaconry did not correspond to the Condroz in any geographical sense.

- The geographical Hesbaye region north of the Meuse was divided between the Hesbaye archdeaconry and the neighbouring archdeaconries of Hainaut, Brabant and Condroz. Condroz held the deanery of Hanret in Hesbaye.
- The archdeaconry of Condroz, like that of Hesbaye, was stretched significantly further east than the pagus or geographical region of Condroz itself, with the inclusion of the deanery of Saint Remacle, which stretched from Liège and Visé along the Vesdre, as far as what is now the Belgian border with Germany.

== Photos ==
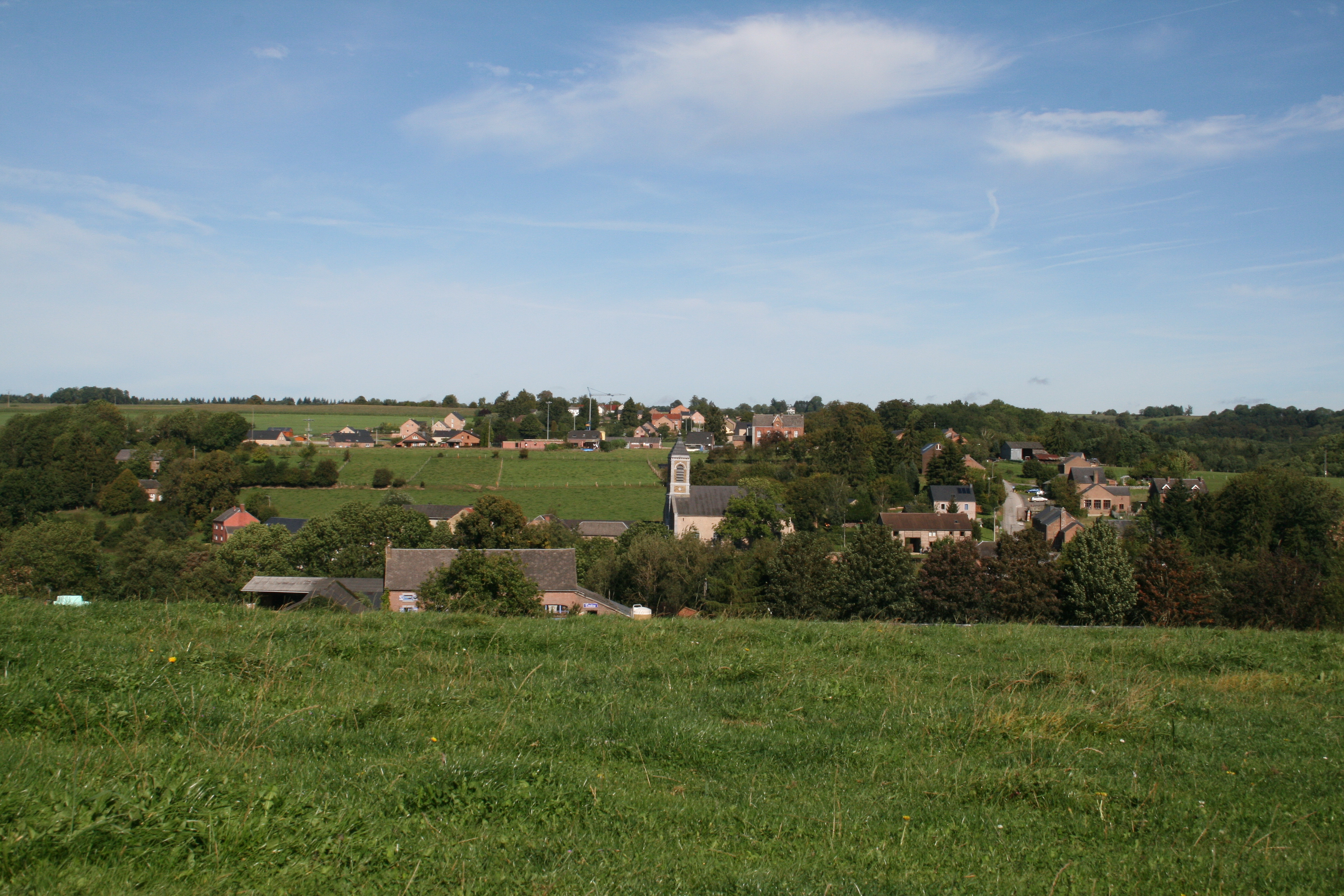
View at Chevetogne near Ciney

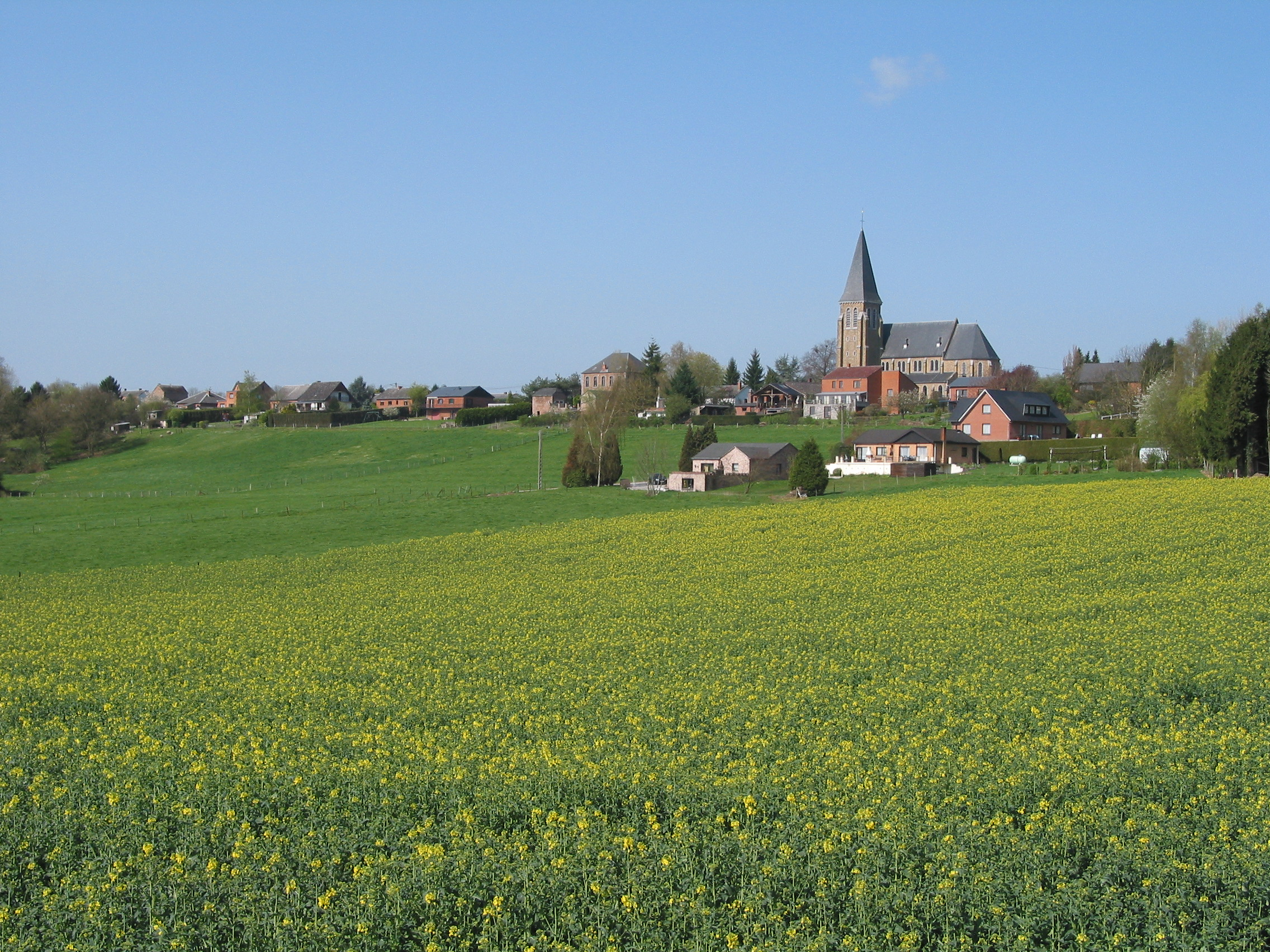
View at Sovet near Ciney

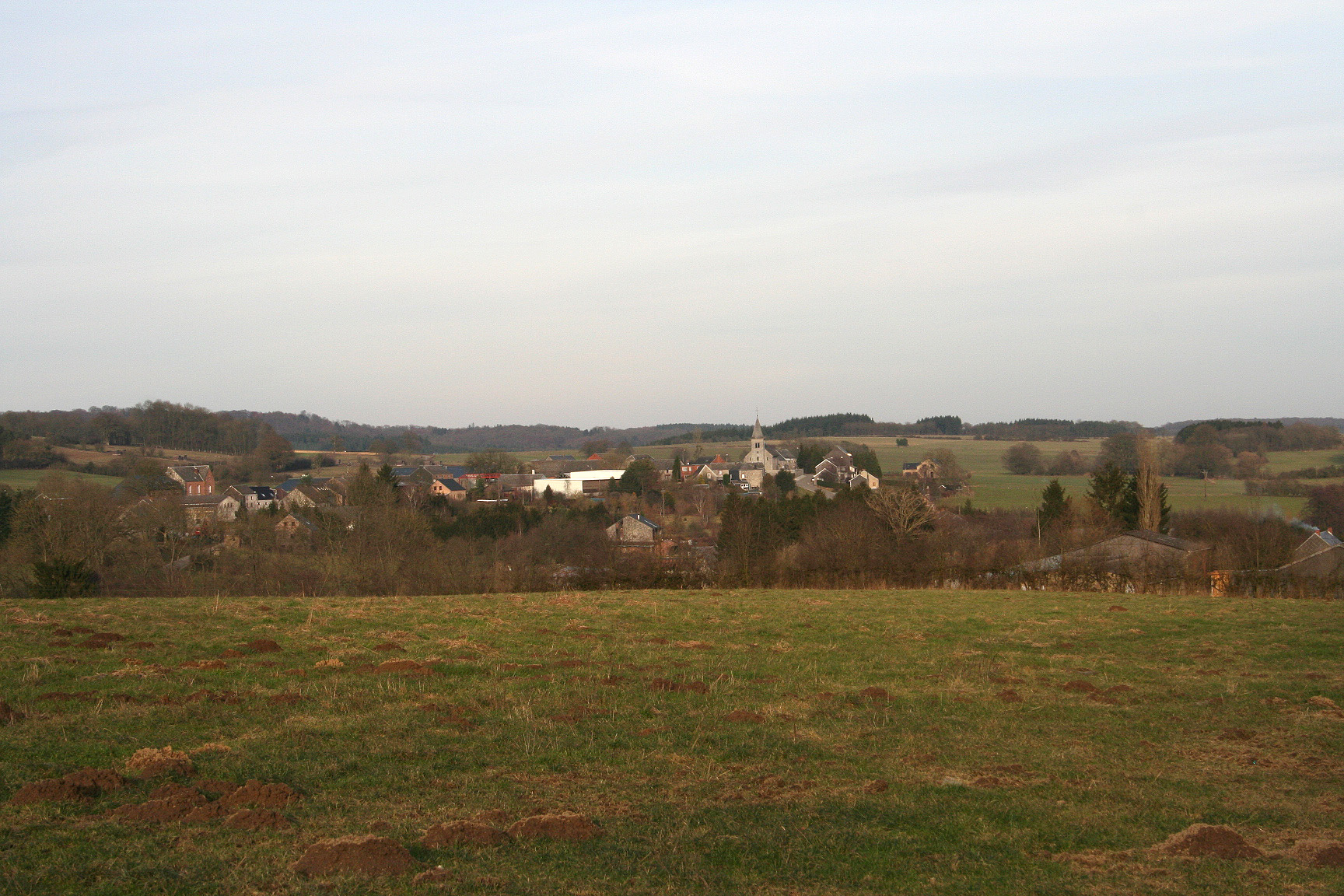
View at Nettinne near Somme-Leuze

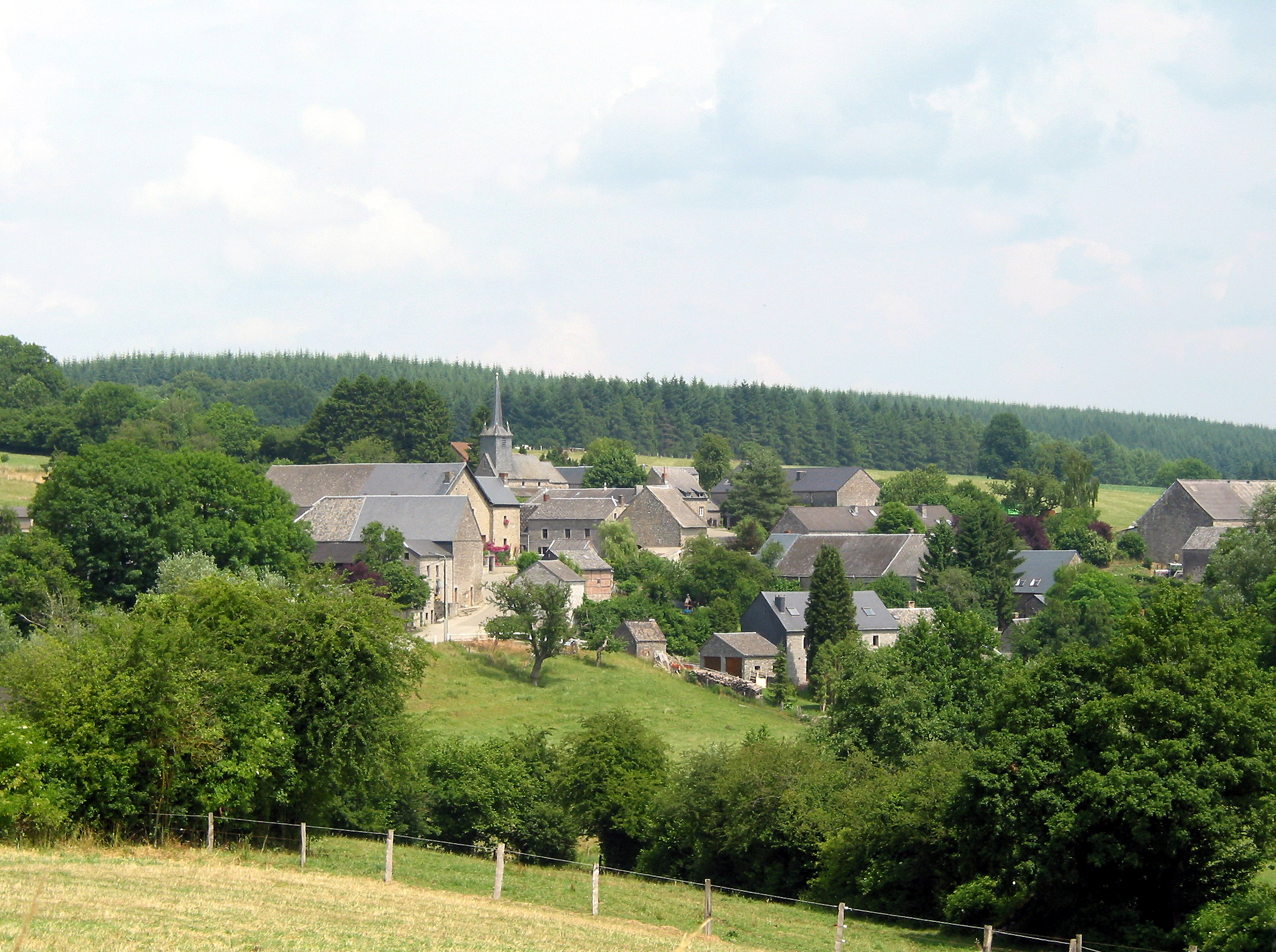
View at Chardeneux near Somme-Leuze

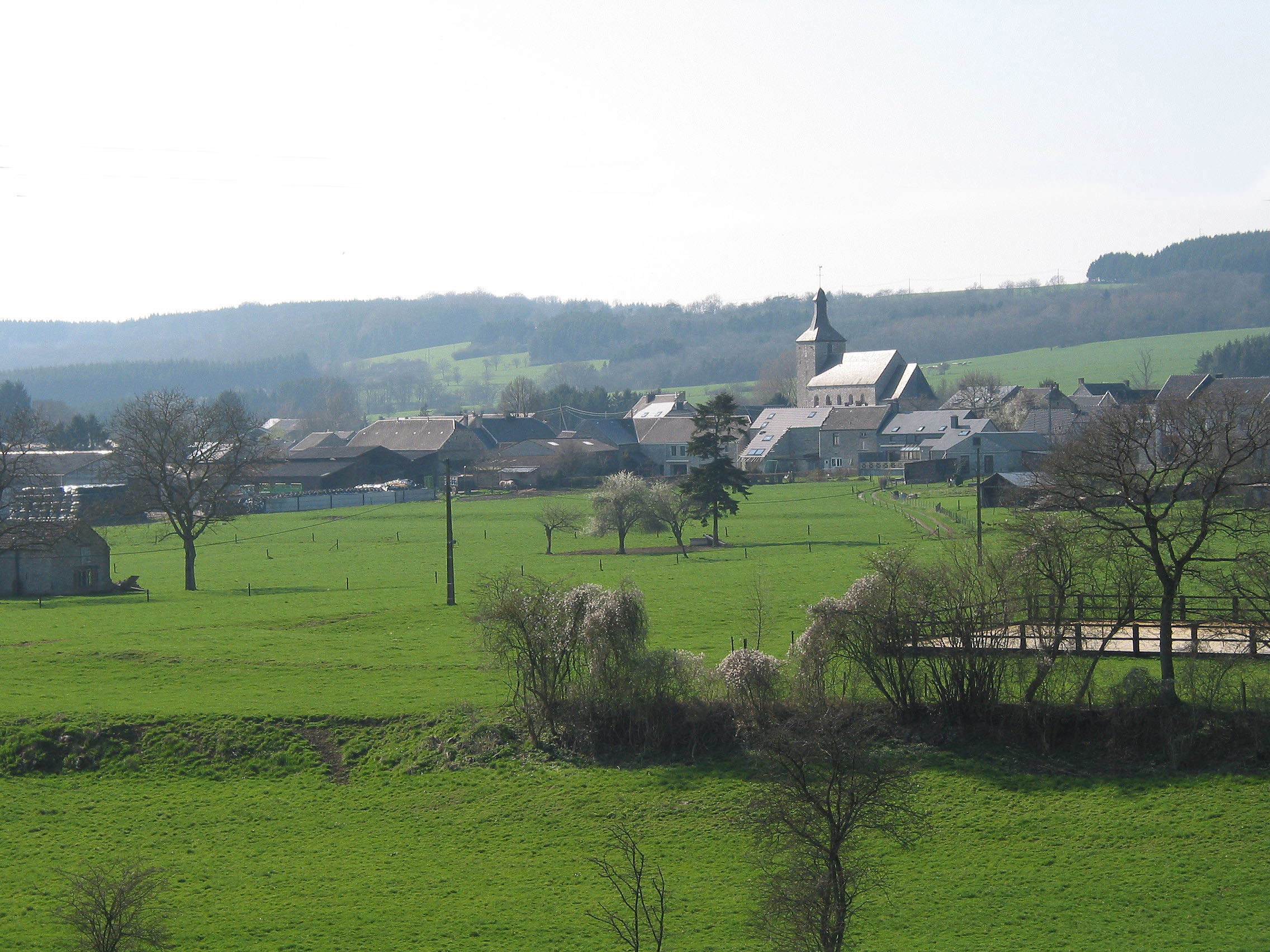
View at Tohogne near Durbuy

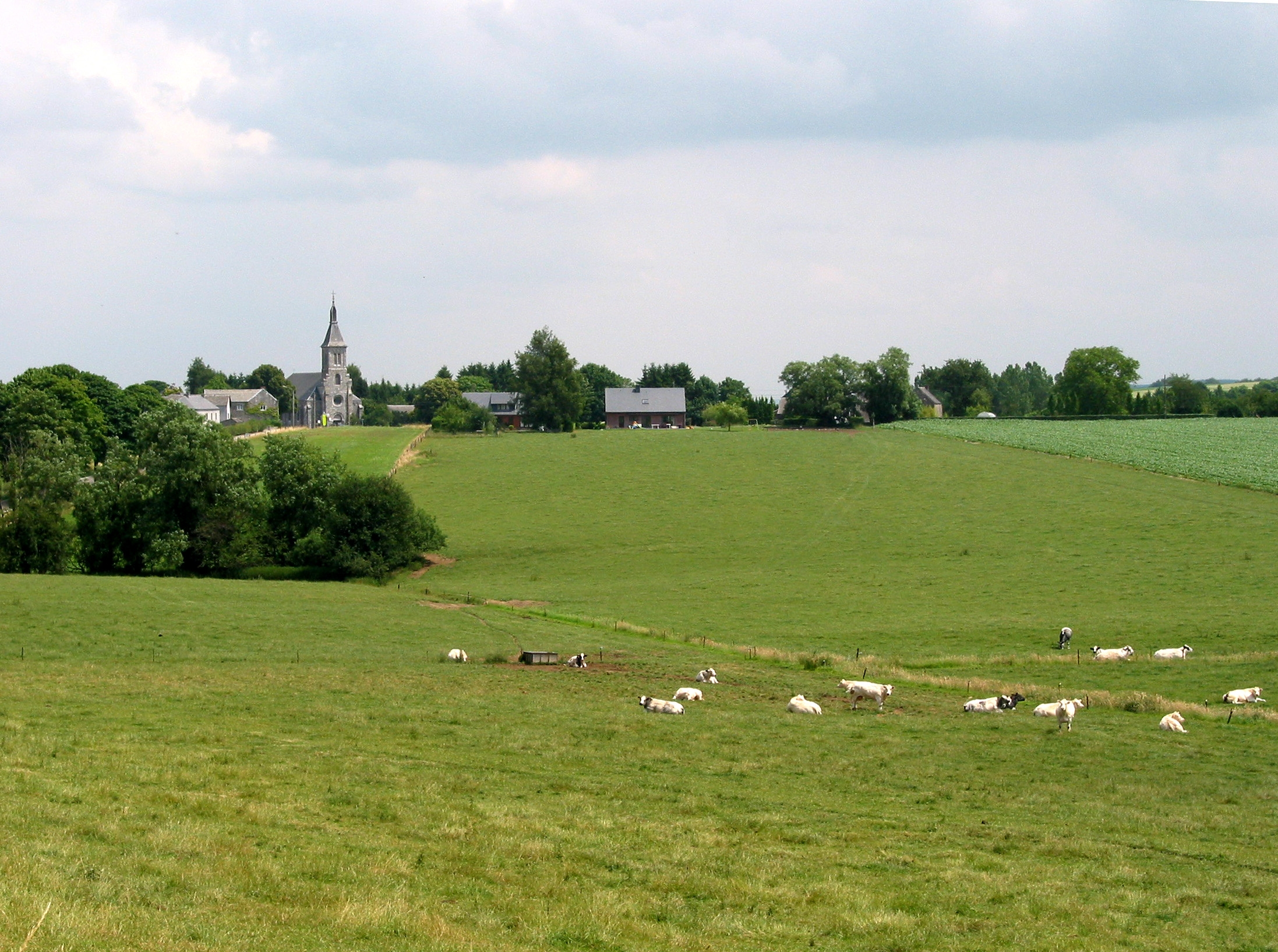
View at Méan near Havelange

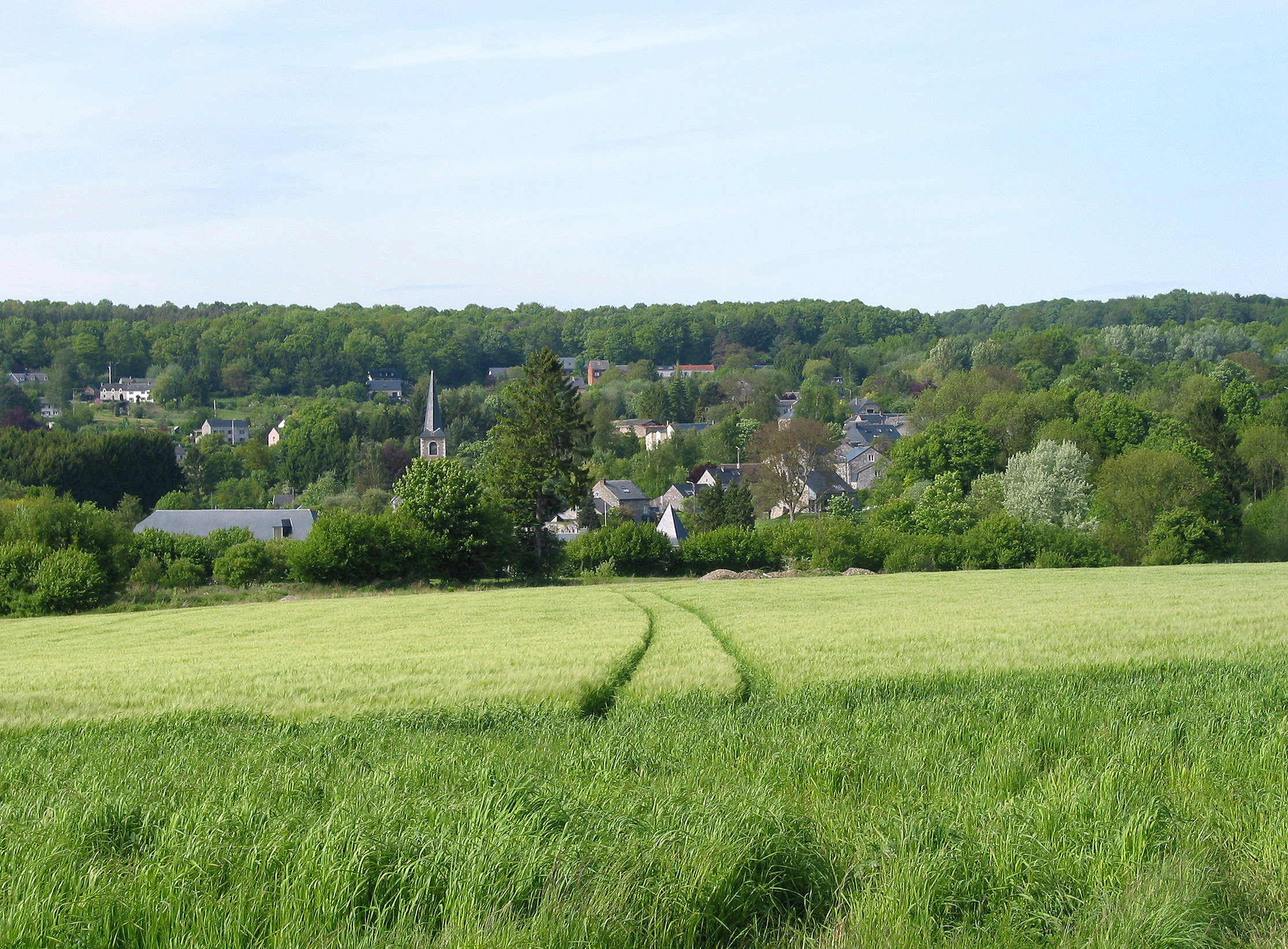
View at Mozet near Gesves

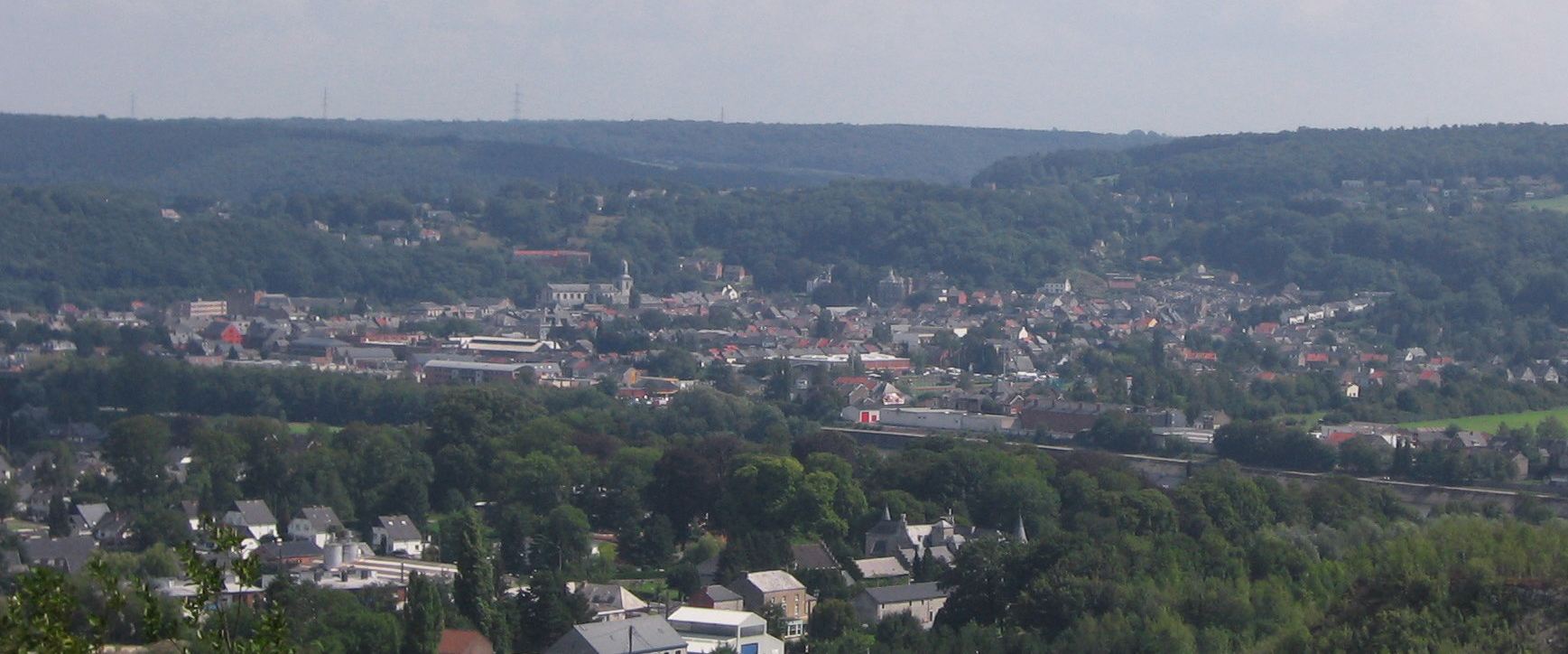
View at Andenne

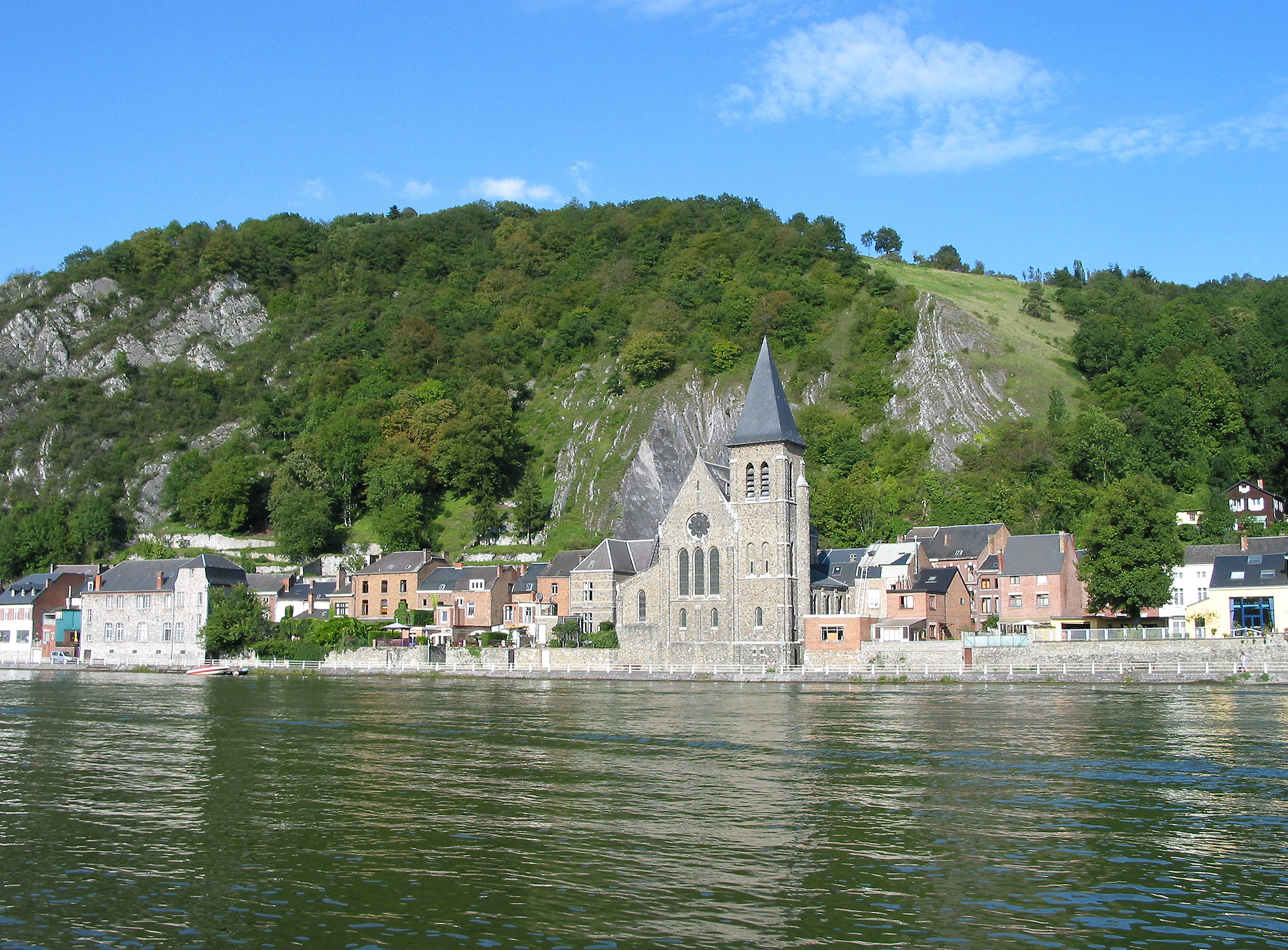
View at Dinant

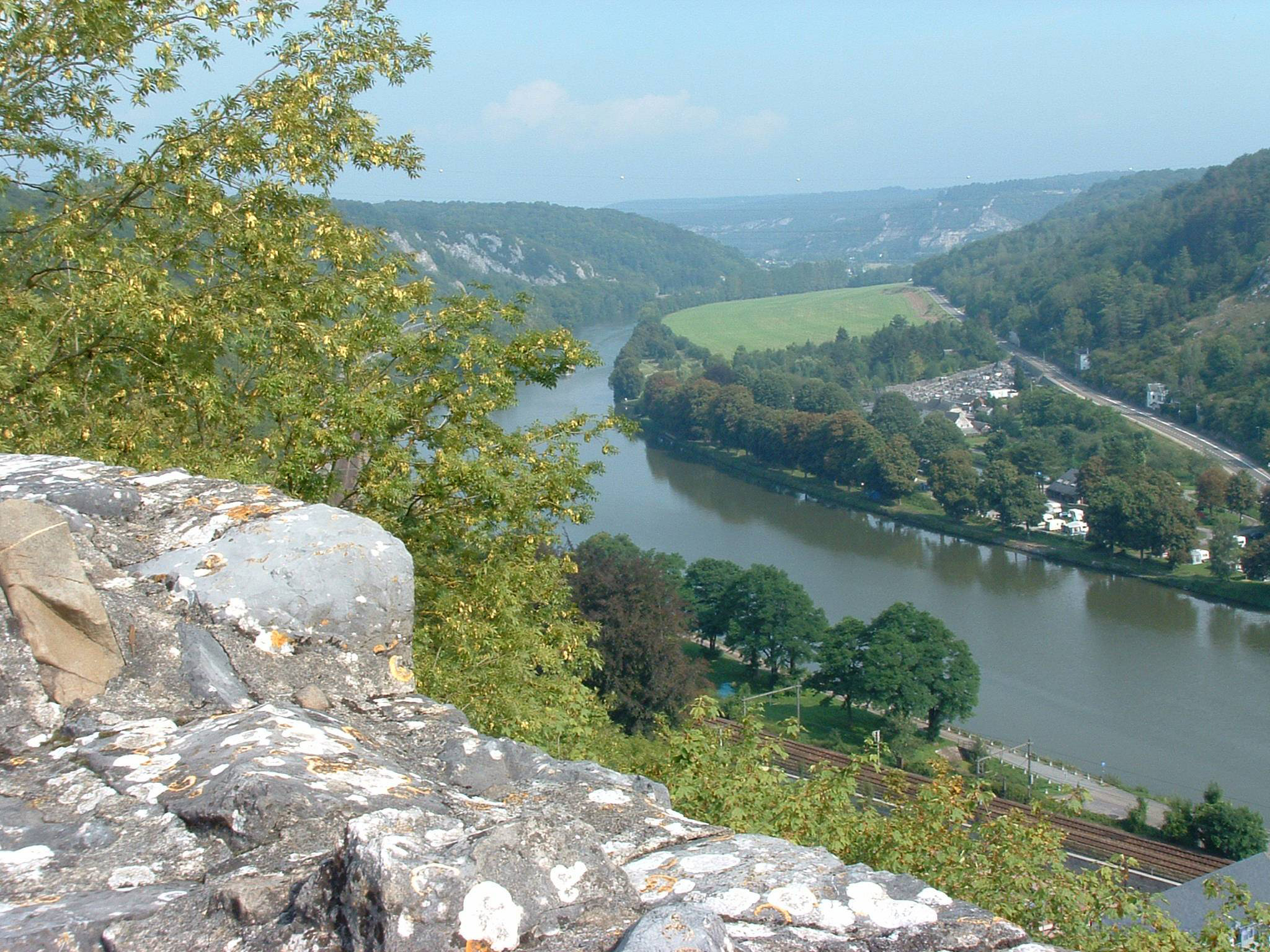
Meuse river near Dinant
