= Hesbaye =

Cultural and geophysical region in Belgium

Coordinates: 50.75°N 5.3°E

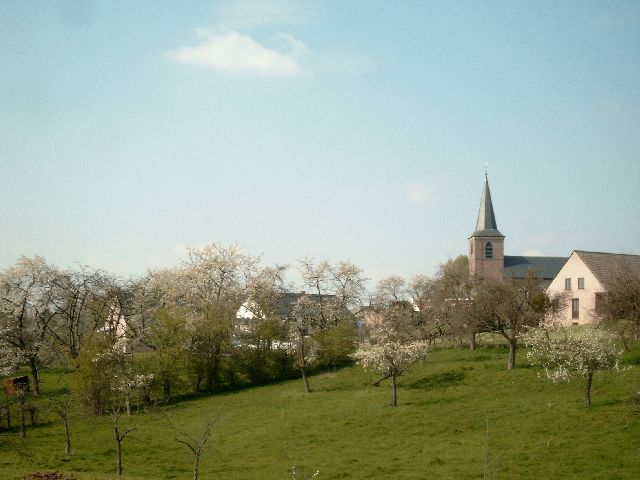
Blooming fruit trees at Kerniel, a typical Hesbayean village in the municipality of Borgloon.

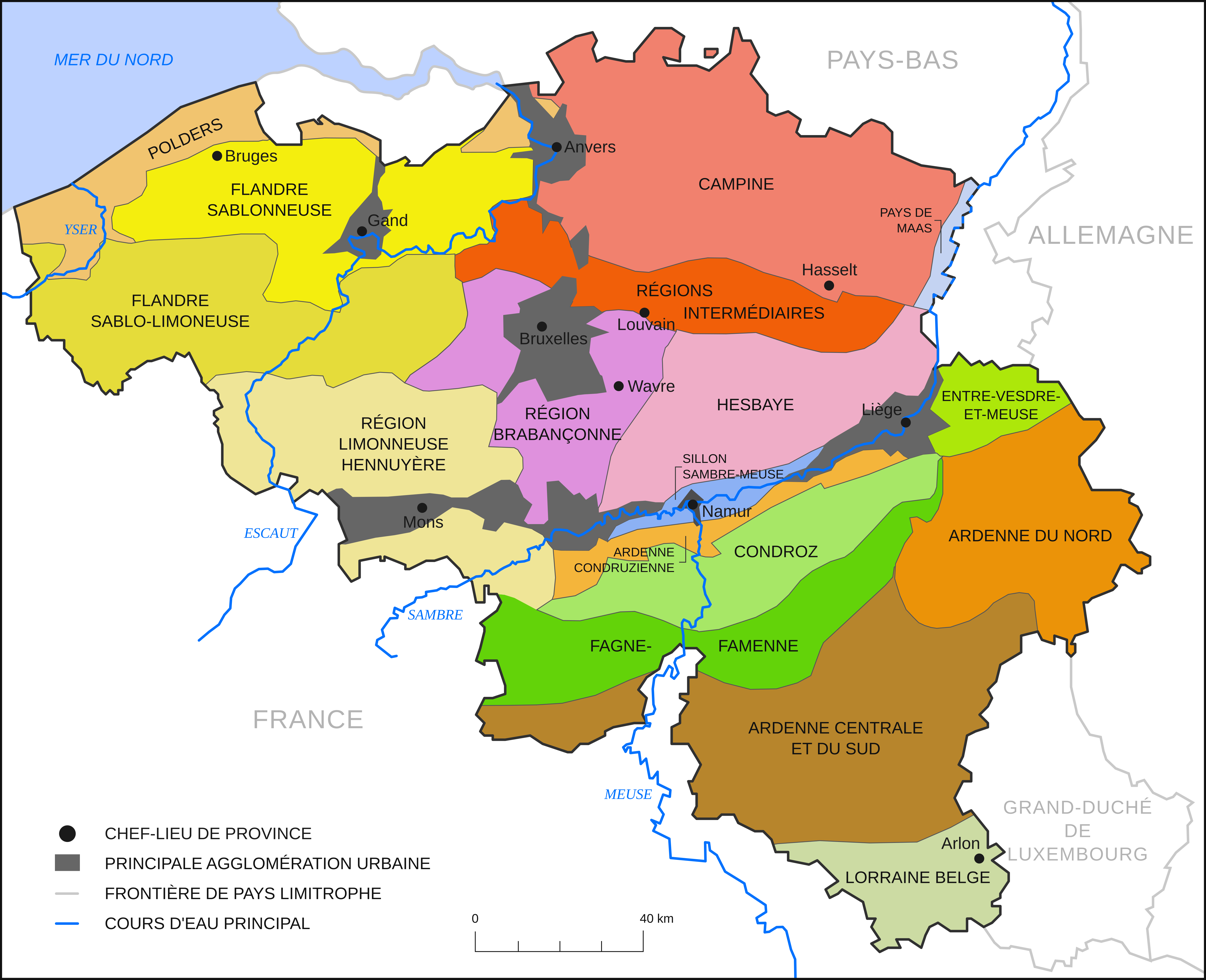
The natural regions of Belgium.

The Hesbaye (French, French pronunciation: [ɛsbɛ]), or Haspengouw (Dutch and Limburgish, Dutch pronunciation: [ˈɦɑspə(ŋ)ˌɣʌu]), is a traditional cultural and geophysical region in eastern Belgium. It is a loamy plateau region which forms a watershed between the Meuse and Scheldt drainage basins. It has been one of the main agricultural regions in what is now Belgium since before Roman times, and specifically named in records since the Middle Ages, when it was an important Frankish pagus or gau, called Hasbania in medieval Latin.

== Location ==
Major parts of three Belgian provinces are dominated by the Hesbaye landscape, important for both tourism and agriculture, and by some definitions it stretches further:

- The southern half of the province of Limburg, including the cities of Tongeren, Sint-Truiden, Bilzen and Borgloon.
- Liège province north of the Meuse, including for example the towns of Hannut and Waremme.
- Eastern Walloon Brabant including Jodoigne and Perwez.
- Easternmost Flemish Brabant, including Tienen, Hoegaarden, Landen and Zoutleeuw.
- Northern Namur province.

Geographically, Hesbaye borders on several similar regions of rolling hills:

- The Hageland to the west is the region between the Hesbaye and Louvain, in the eastern part of the province of Flemish Brabant. Historians such as Léon Vanderkindere and Jean Baerten believe this was once considered to be part of the Hesbaye.
- The Condroz lies on the opposite, southern side of the Meuse. Like the Hesbaye, this has been a fertile region since Roman times, and still has the same name as its medieval predecessor. However, for the most part it has a stonier soil, and less fertile conditions for agriculture.
- To the northeast, is the Dutch-speaking Meuse (Dutch: Maas) valley and "South Limburg" in the Netherlands, which are culturally and politically linked to the Dutch-speaking Hesbaye in Belgian Limburg. In the Middle Ages, much of South Limburg was in the Catholic deanery of Hasbania.
- Directly east, is the Pays de Herve in Wallonia.

In contrast, to the north it borders on the flat sandy Kempen region. And over the Meuse to the southeast are the rocky hills of the Ardennes. In the west the plateau ends at the Dyle river valley, except to its south where a smaller extension of the plateau landscape stretches into Hainaut and between Brussels and Charleroi, sometimes referred to as the "plateau brabançonne".

== Dry and humid Hesbaye ==
The Hesbaye is often divided into two divisions based on stratigraphy, with the boundary running through Sint-Truiden, Borgloon and Tongeren in Dutch-speaking southern Limburg. The northern "Humid" Hesbaye (Dutch Vochtig Haspengouw, French Hesbaye Humide) has a higher water table due to the Tongrian and Rupelian clay-containing layers near the surface, and many springs. It is by far the main fruit growing area of Belgium, as well as home to some of the most northerly vineyards in Belgium. The southern "Dry" division is somewhat more fertile and the ground water sinks more easily; in this region sugar beet, chicory, flax, rapeseed and grains (90% of which is wheat and barley) are cultivated.

== Name ==
In the oldest Latin documents the name of the pagus (country or territory) was typically Hasbania. As demonstrated in the collection of such records given by Ulrich Nonn, this was generally given in an adjectival form such as pagus hasbaniensis. Only a small number of such records added the Germanic word gau or gouw. Verhelst (p. 245 n.45) proposed that the small number cases of medieval Latin which include the "gau" ending are un-coincidentally in or near the old deaconry of Tongeren, which he proposed to be the historical core of the Hesbaye. Therefore, he proposed, the terms Hasbania and Haspengouw can not be assumed to have identical meanings in all records, even though in modern Dutch the form with "gouw" is now the only one, while in modern French the form without is the only one.

Latin continued to be use in documentation in the Belgian area into the early modern era, and it has been noted that spelling variations sometimes even included Hispania (or similar) which would usually refer to geographical area containing Spain and Portugal.

== History ==
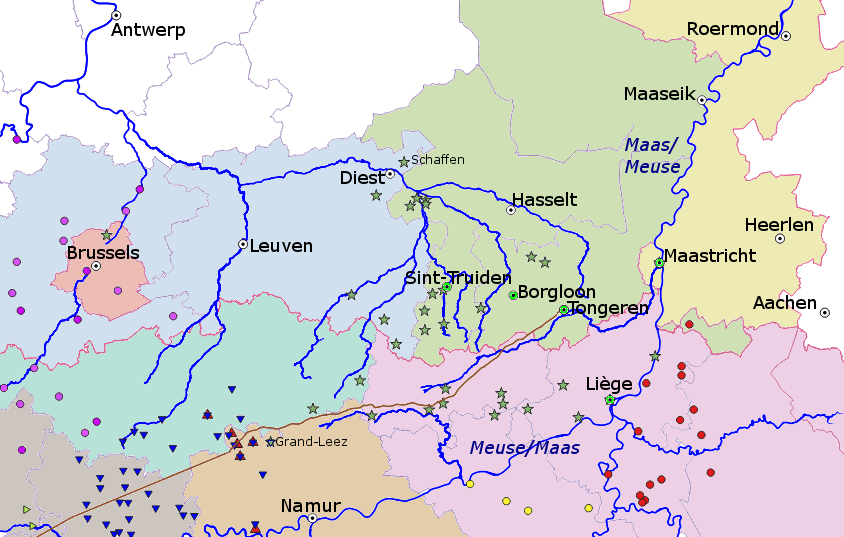
The green stars show early medieval records of places which were in the pagus of Hasbania. The coloured areas are modern provinces of Belgium and the Netherlands.

In Roman times, Haspengouw formed the fertile agricultural core area of the Civitas Tungrorum, containing its capital in Tongeren, and with sandy Toxandria to the north of it in the Campine, and the stony hills of the Condroz and Ardennes to the south. The Salian Franks were allowed to settle in Toxandria in the 4th century, while the more heavily populated Haspengouw remained more Romanized. Frankish power however eventually extended over neighbouring Romans. From at least the eighth century Hesbaye was an important geographical division in the Merovingian Frankish kingdom of Austrasia.

In the 8th century, Robert, who has been proposed as an ancestor of the Capetians, was described as a Duke or Count of Hasbania, implying that in his lifetime maybe it formed one large political area. In a grant of 741 some of his lands near Diest were described as being in the country of "Hasbaniensi et Mansuarinsi", the Hasbanians and the Mansuarini.

Later, Hasbania was mentioned in the division of territories between Charles the Bald and Louis the German in 870 in the Treaty of Meerssen, which specifically mentions that it had four counties at that time. Its exact boundaries are unclear but it may have stretched as far west as Leuven and the River Dyle. Judging from the ancient catholic Archdeaconry of Hesbaye, it may also have stretched to the east of the Meuse.

In the 10th century, smaller counties considered to have been within the pagus of Hesbaye included a County of Avernas (with its capital town in modern Hannut), a county which was itself called Haspinga, possibly between the rivers Jeker and the Meuse, and a county named Huste or Hufte, which might have had its seat at modern Hocht in modern Lanaken, in the extreme northeast of the area. It is possible that Vliermaal played a role in a county also, for example in Hocht, because in later times it was a court town for the County of Loon. In the west an apparently short-lived and small county named Brunengeruz was absorbed by the growing power of the westernmost county based in Louvain/Leuven.

In the early 11th century the County of Loon, with its comital seat in Borgloon first starts to appear in records. Along with Louvain, whose power indeed proceeded to expand beyond the region, these two counties proved to be lasting.

In 1040, the Emperor Henry III recognized a county called Hasbania as being under the prince-bishop Nithard of Liège. This Hasbania may have been one of the smaller counties within the Hesbaye, but it seems that the important County of Loon, which had formed out of the Counties of Avernas and Hocht, was considered to be held under it. Much later, the County of Loon was integrated it with the Prince-Bishopric of Liège. Areas to the west of Loon came under the increasing power of the County of Leuven.

By the early 12th century, the County of Duras was established, west of St Truiden.

== See also ==
- Rida (River)

== Bibliography ==
- Nonn, Ulrich (1983), Pagus und Comitatus in Niederlothringen: Untersuchung zur politischen Raumgliederung im frühen Mittelalter
- Verhelst, Karel (1984), "Een nieuwe visie op de omvang en indeling van de pagus Hasbania (part 1)", Handelingen van de Koninklijke Zuidnederlandsche Maatschappij voor Taal- en Letterkunde en Geschiednis, 38
- Verhelst, Karel (1985), "Een nieuwe visie op de omvang en indeling van de pagus Hasbania (part 2)", Handelingen van de Koninklijke Zuidnederlandsche Maatschappij voor Taal- en Letterkunde en Geschiednis, 39
