= Battle of the Wines =

1224 French poem

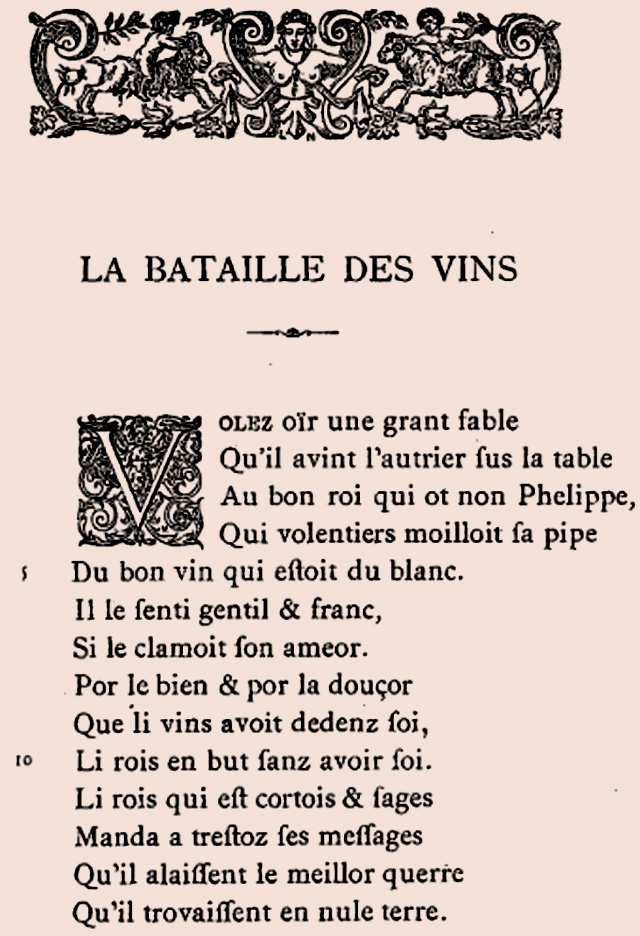
The first page of Battle of the Wines

The Battle of the Wines (fr. La Bataille des Vins), sometimes called "The Battle of the Blends" was a notable poem written by Henry d'Andeli in 1224 and tells the story of a famous wine tasting organized by the French king Philip Augustus. Over 70 samples from France and across Europe, including Cyprus, Spain and the Mosel region, were tasted and judged by an English priest.

The priest classified the wines he tasted as either Celebrated for those which pleased him, or Excommunicated for those that did not meet his standards. In the end a sweet wine from Cyprus, widely believed to be Commandaria won the overall tasting, and was awarded the supreme title of "Apostle".

== Wines from France ==
=== Celebrated wines ===
- Laon
- Clermont
- Crouy
- Soissons
- Montmorency
- Hautvillers
- Épernay
- Argenteuil
- Deuil
- Pierrefitte
- Marly
- Trilbardou
- Sézanne
- Saint-Yon
- Samois
- Orléans
- Jargeau
- Tonnerre
- Auxerre
- Chablis
- Saint-Bris
- Vermenton
- Orchaise
- Vézelay
- Montrichard
- Lassay
- Sancerre
- Savigny
- Beaune
- Nevers
- Issoudun
- Châteauroux
- Buzançais
- Poitiers
- Chauvigny
- Saint-Pourçain
- La Rochelle
- Montmorillon
- Saint-Jean-d'Angély
- Taillebourg
- Saintes
- Angoulême
- Saint-Émilion
- Bordeaux
- Moissac
- Montpellier
- Béziers
- Carcassonne
- Narbonne

=== Excommunicated wines ===
- Chambilly
- Le Mans
- Rennes
- Étampes
- Argences
- Beauvais
- Châlons-sur-Marne
