= Philippide =

Philippide may refer to:

- Philippide, poem by William the Breton about Philip Augustus
- Alexandru I. Philippide 1859–1933), Romanian linguist and philologist
- Alexandru A. Philippide (1900–1979), Romanian poet
