= Château de Gisors =

Castle in France

- Gisors in the department of Eure, France
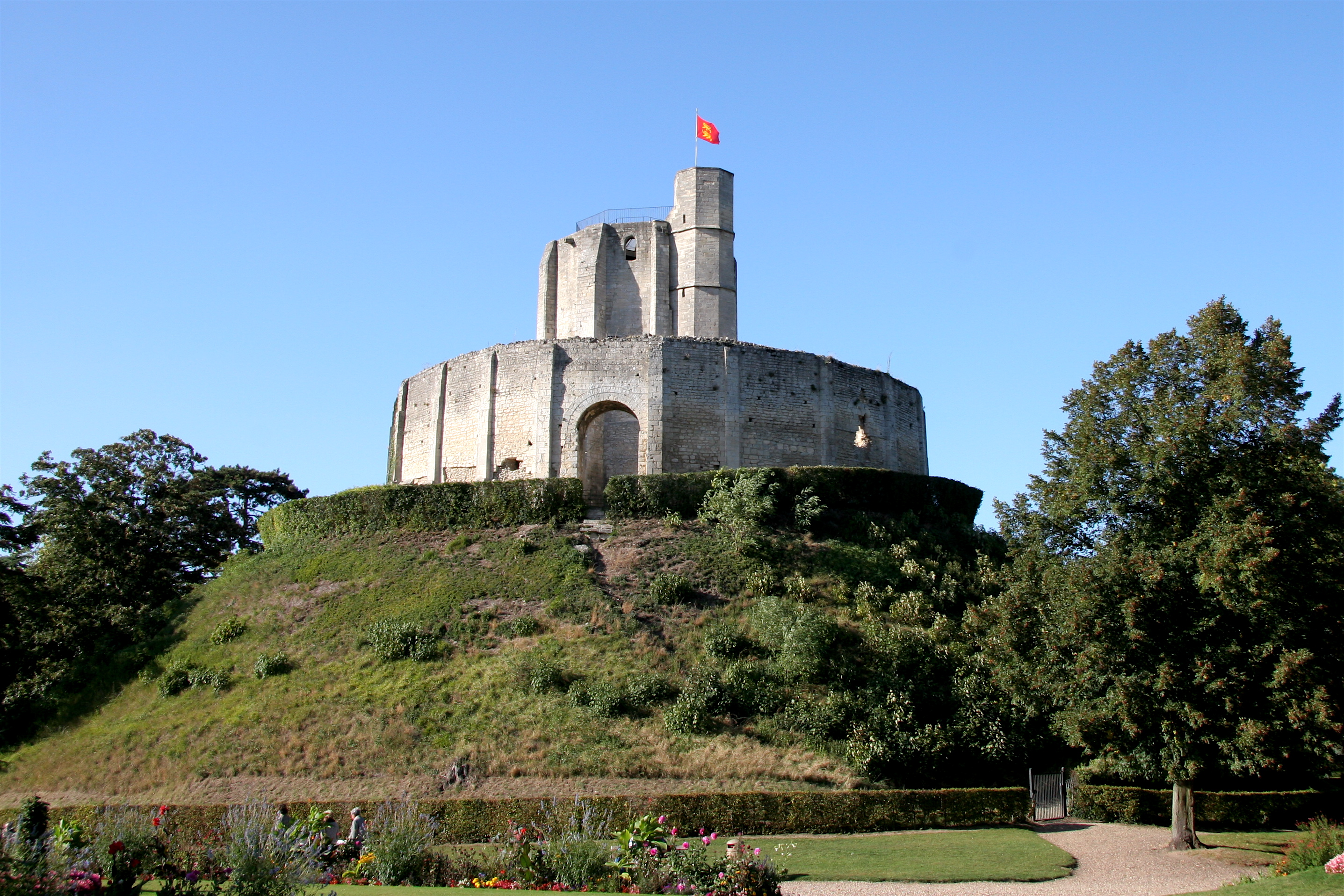
- The original octagonal keep and chemise (outer wall) of Gisors

Site information
- Type: Motte-and-bailey castle
- Controlled by: Dukes of Normandy

Location
- Location within France
- Coordinates: 49.279903°N 1.772975°E

The Château de Gisors is a castle in the town of Gisors in the department of Eure, France. The castle was a key fortress of the Dukes of Normandy in the 11th and 12th centuries. It was intended to defend the Anglo-Norman Vexin territory from the pretensions of the King of France.

== History ==
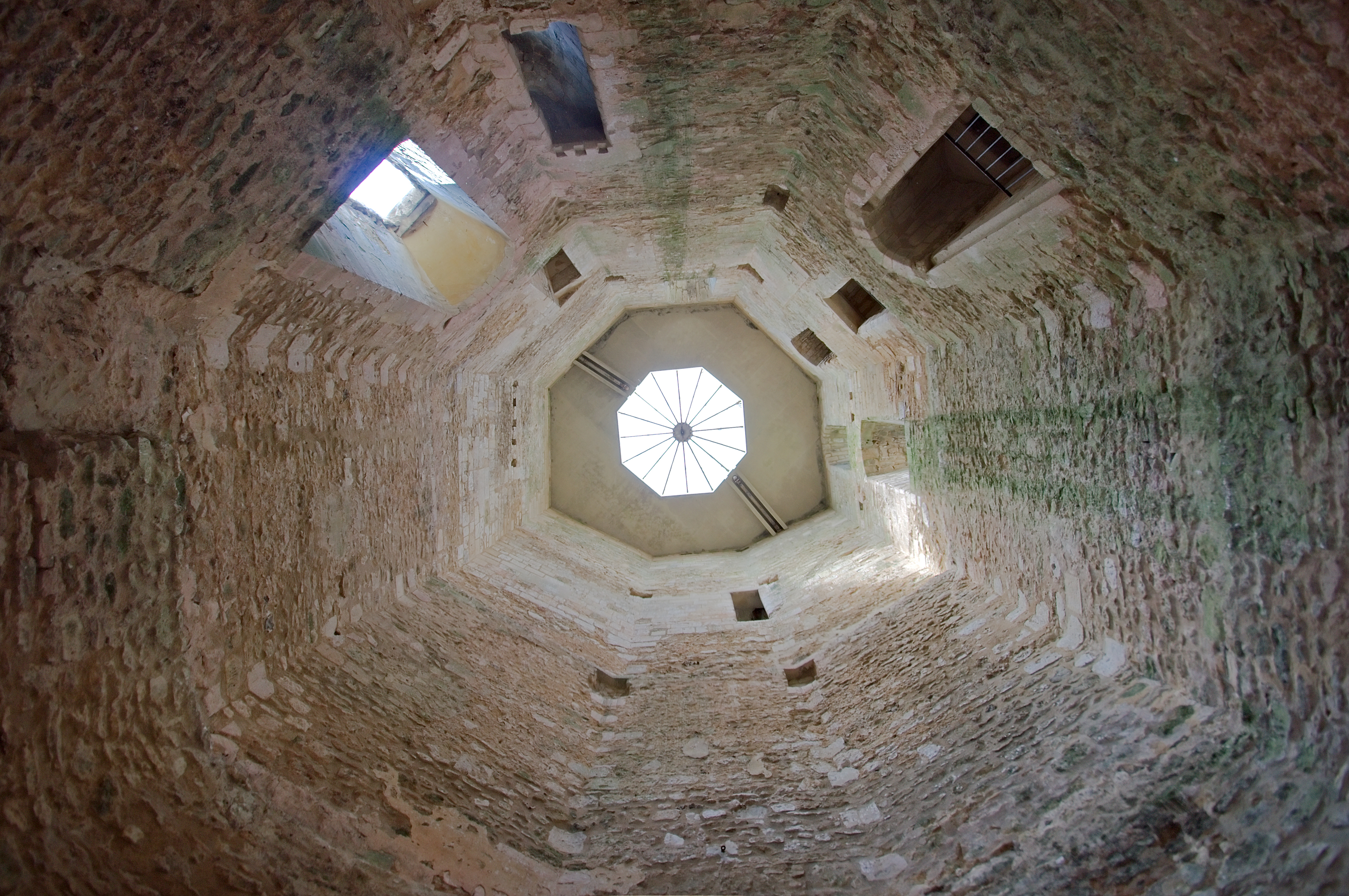
The interior of the 12th-century keep. Originally wooden floors would have divided the tower into different floors.

King William II of England ordered Robert of Bellême to build the first castle at Gisors. Henry I of England built the octagonal stone keep surmounting the motte; his work at Gisors was part of a programme of royal castle building in Normandy during his reign to secure the region against the aspirations of the French crown. It saw the construction of more than 25 castles.

In 1193, as King Richard I of England (also Duke of Normandy) was imprisoned in Germany, the castle, while under the command of Gilbert de Vascoeuil fell into the hands of King Philip II of France. After Richard's death in 1199, Philip conquered much of the rest of Normandy and Gisors thereafter lost a good part of its importance as a frontier castle.

The castle is also known for its links with the Templars, being put into their charge by the French king between 1158 and 1160. During the arrest and Trials of the Knights Templar in the early 14th century, several knights were held at the castle awaiting trial: Henri Zappellans or Chapelain, Anceau de Rocheria, Enard de Valdencia, Guillaume de Roy, Geoffroy de Cera or de La Fere-en-Champagne, Robert Harle or de Hermenonville, and Dreux de Chevru. Gisors Castle also became the final prison of the Grand Master of the Order, Jacques de Molay, in 1314.

Although it has been estimated that the bailey could have housed 1,000 soldiers, in 1438 (during the Hundred Years' War) the English garrison numbered just 90. By 1448, this had decreased to 43.

== Description ==
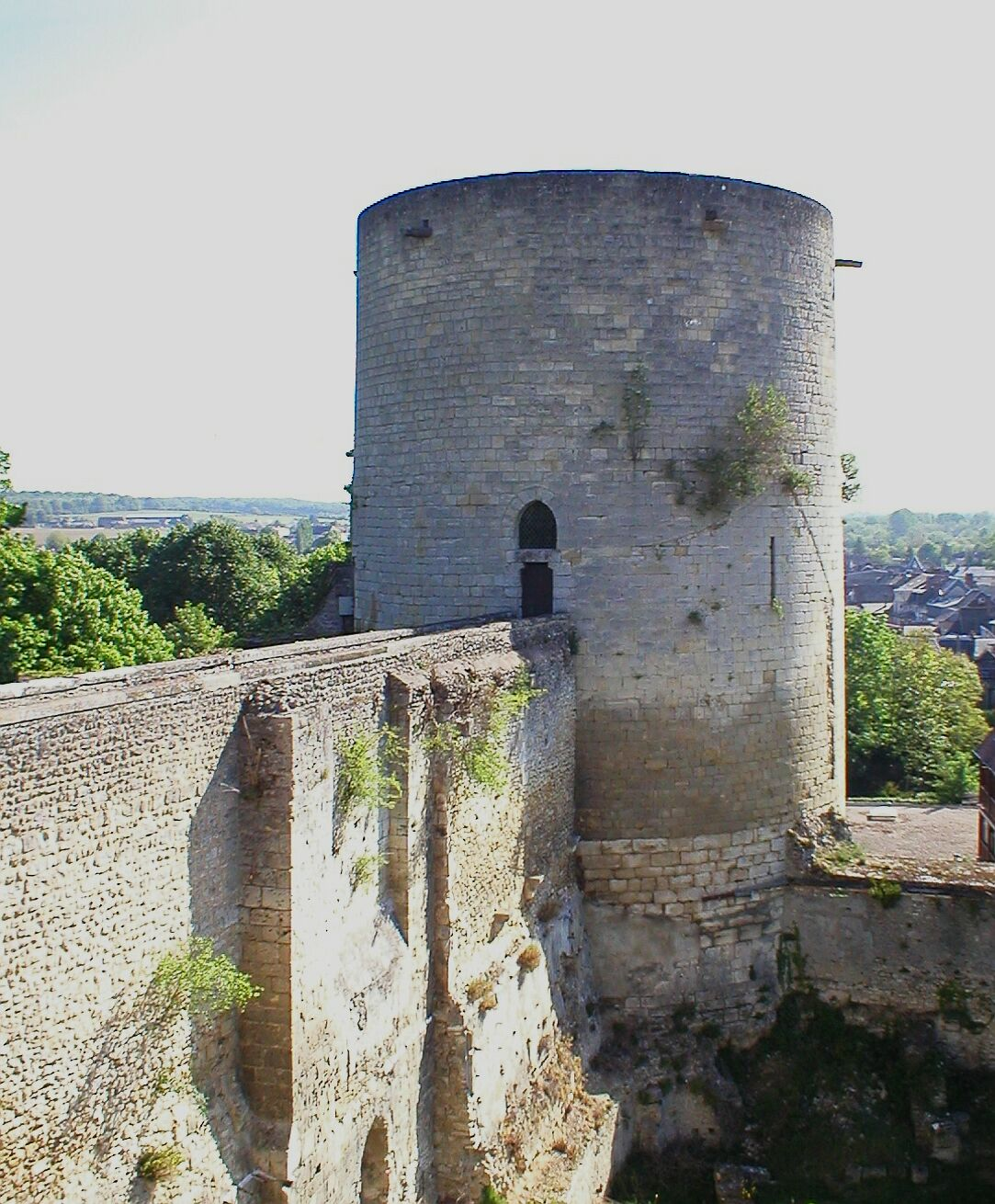
Gisor's 13th-century keep

The first building work is dated to about 1095, and consisted of a motte, which was enclosed in a spacious courtyard or bailey. Henry I of England, Duke of Normandy, added an octagonal stone keep to the motte. After 1161, important reinforcement work saw this keep raised and augmented; the wooden palisade of the motte converted to stone, thus forming a chemise; and the outer wall of the bailey was completed in stone with flanking towers. The octagonal keep is considered one of the best preserved examples of a shell keep.

A second keep, cylindrical, called the Prisoner's Tower (tour du prisonnier), was added to the outer wall of the castle at the start of the 13th century, following the French conquest of Normandy. Further reinforcement was added during the Hundred Years' War. In the 16th century, earthen ramparts were built.

Since 1862, the Château de Gisors has been recognised as a monument historique by the French Ministry of Culture.

== See also ==
- List of castles in France
- Gérard de Sède
- French Romanesque architecture

== Sources ==
- Chibnall, Marjorie (1979). "Feudal Society in Orderic Vitalis". In R Allen Brown (ed.). Proceedings of the Battle Conference 1978. The Boydell Press. pp. 35–48. ISBN 0-85115-107-8.
- Crouch, David (2006). The Normans: The History of a Dynasty. Continuum. ISBN 978-1-85285-595-6.
- Kaufmann, J. E.; Kaufmann, H. W. (2004). The Medieval Fortress: castles, forts and walled cities of the Middle Ages. Da Capo. ISBN 978-0-306-81358-0.
- Mesqui, Jean, Chateaux-forts et fortifications en France, Paris: Flammarion, 1997, p. 493. ISBN 2-08-012271-1.
