= Pierre Charlot =

Illegitimate son of Philip II of France

Pierre Charlot, (b.1205/1209 - d. 1249), was the treasurer of St. Martin of Tours, St. Frambaud of Senlis, and St. Fursy of Peronne. He was the illegitimate son of Philip II of France. Elected bishop of Noyon in 1240, Pierre accompanied Louis IX of France on the Seventh Crusade. He died near Cyprus in 1249 and was buried in the cathedral of Noyon.

== Life ==
Pierre was born between 1205 and 1209, the illegitimate son of Philip II of France and an unknown mother. (Note: According to Baldwin, Pierre's mother was a "lady of Arras".) Despite his illegitimate birth, Pierre's father hired William the Breton as his tutor, and following his father's death, William dedicated the prologue in his "Philippidos" to him. Pierre was given a dispensation, owing to his illegitimate birth, from Pope Honorius III which allowed him to hold ecclesiastical benefices.

=== Appointments ===
By 1232, Pierre was appointed treasurer of the church of St. Martin in Tours. In 1234 a number of canons challenged the election on the grounds that it had been procured by coercion and threats. In 1235 he held the offices of treasurer of Saint-Frambaud of Senlis and of Saint-Fursy of Péronne.

In 1240, Pierre and John, the dean of St. Martin of Tours, both received the same number of votes in the election for bishop of Noyon. The decision was sent to Rome and through the appeals of Louis IX of France, Pierre was awarded the bishopric. The decision, drew letters of complaint from Pope Gregory IX to the archbishop of Reims, chapter of Namur, and the bishop of Palestrina. Gregory argued that Pierre was the child of an adulterous relationship and thus ineligible to hold the office of bishop without a special dispensation, and he should be removed from office and placed on a three-year suspension from his benefices. Despite papal animosity, Pierre kept his episcopate.

=== Crusade ===
Pierre accompanied his nephew, King Louis IX, on the Seventh Crusade to the Holy Land, and died near Cyprus in 1249 and was buried in the cathedral of Noyon.

== Sources ==
- Baldwin, John W. (1986). The Government of Philip Augustus: Foundations of French Royal Power in the. University of California Press.
- Field, Sean L. (2019). Courting Sanctity: Holy Women and the Capetians. Cornell University Press.
- Gorochov, Nathalie (2007). "L'Universite recrut-t-elle dans la ville? Le cas de Paris au XIII siecle". In Gilli, Patrick; Verger, Jacques; Le Blévec, Daniel (eds.). Les universités et la ville au Moyen Âge: Cohabitation et tension (in French). Brill. pp. 257–296.
- Harvey, Katherine (2014). Episcopal Appointments in England, c. 1214–1344: From Episcopal Election to Papal Provision. Ashgate Publishing.
- McDougall, Sara (2017). Royal Bastards: The Birth of Illegitimacy, 800-1230. Oxford University Press.
- Richard, Jean (1992). Saint Louis, Crusader King of France. Cambridge University Press.
