= Henry of Valenciennes =

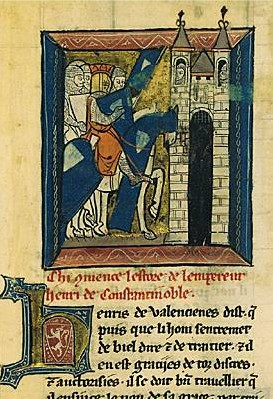
First page of Henry's chronicle

Henry of Valenciennes was an early 13th-century French writer, historian and chronicler of the Latin Empire.

Henry of Valenciennes was a chronicler under Henry of Flanders who left for the Fourth Crusade with the army of his patron. In 1204, following the capture of Constantinople by the Franco-Venetian forces, he became a canon in the Hagia Sophia. In 1206, the year of his patron's accession to the throne of the Latin Empire, he was tasked with compiling a chronicle mostly focused on his deeds, roughly picking up where Geoffrey of Villehardouin's chronicle concludes. As a result, Henry's chronicle is usually included with Geoffrey's in the surviving manuscripts. It abruptly ends in 1209 or 1210, but it is notable for its account of the Battle of Philippopolis in 1208. Henry is also credited with the Lai d'Aristote, previously attributed to the Norman Henry d'Andeli.
