= Rigord =

French chronicler (c. 1150 – c. 1209)

Rigord (Rigordus) (c. 1150 – c. 1209) was a French chronicler. He was probably born near Alais in Languedoc, and became a physician.

After becoming a monk he entered the monastery of Argenteuil, and then that of Saint-Denis, and described himself as "regis Francorum chronographus".

Rigord wrote the Gesta Philippi Augusti, dealing with the life of the French king, Philip Augustus, from his coronation in 1179 until 1206. The work, which is very valuable, was abridged and continued by William the Breton. The earlier part of the Gesta speaks of the king in very laudatory terms, but in the latter part it is much less flattering in its tone.

Rigord also wrote a short chronicle of the kings of France.

== Editions ==
The Gesta is published in tome xvii of Dom Martin Bouquet's Recueil des historiens des Gaules et de la France (Paris, 1738–1876); and with introduction by HF Delaborde (Paris, 1882–85). A French translation of the Gesta is in tome xi of Guizot's Collection des mémoires relatifs à l'histoire de France (Paris, 1825).

There is an English translation by Larry F. Field in The Deeds of Philip Augustus: An English Translation of Rigord's "Gesta Philippi Augusti", edited by M. Cecilia Gaposchkin and Sean L. Field with a preface by Paul R. Hyams (Cornell University Press, 2022).
