= William the Breton =

French chronicler and poet

William the Breton (c. 1165 – c. 1225), French chronicler and poet, was a contemporary and dependent of French king Philip Augustus for whom he served in diplomatic missions and for whom he wrote a Latin prose chronicle and a Latin epic poem.

William the Breton was, as his name indicates, born in Brittany, probably in the town of Saint-Pol-de-Léon. He was educated at Mantes and at the University of Paris. William gained the status of "Master" and was recorded by his contemporary Giles of Paris as one of the fifteen sages of Paris of his day. Later, he became chaplain to the French king Philip Augustus, who employed him on diplomatic errands, and entrusted him with the education of his natural son, Pierre Charlot. William is supposed to have been present at the Battle of Bouvines in 1214.

His works are the Philippide and the Gesta Philippi H. regis Francorum. The former, a classicizing Latin epic poem in 12 books and composed in three redactions, gives some very interesting details about Philip Augustus and his time, including some information about military matters, and shows that William was an excellent Latin scholar.

In its final form the Gesta is an epitome of the work of Rigord, who wrote a life of Philip Augustus from 1179 to 1206, and an original continuation by William himself from 1207 to 1220. In both works William speaks in very laudatory terms of the king; but his writings are valuable because he had personal knowledge of many of the facts which he relates. He also wrote a poem, Karlotis, dedicated to Charlot, which is lost.

William's works were edited with an introduction by Henri Delaborde as Œuvres de Rigord et de Guillaume le Breton (Paris, 1882–1885), and were translated into French by François Guizot in Collection des mémoires relatifs a l'histoire de France, tomes xi and xii (Paris, 1823–1835). See Delaborde's introduction, and Auguste Molinier, Les Sources de l'histoire de France, tome iii (Paris, 1903). Book I of the Philippide, along with relevant selections of the Gesta, was translated into English by Gregory P. Stringer.
