= Gilbert de Vascoeuil =

French nobleman

- Born: 1150
- Died: After 1193
- Noble family: De Vascoeuil
- Issue: Pétronille De Vascoeuil
- Father: Gautier De Vascoeuil
- Mother: Aénor De Dammartin

Gilbert de Vascoeuil, Lord of Saint-Denis-le-Thiboult, Lord of Vascœuil, Castellan of Gisors, was a nobleman during the time of the Angevin Empire. He owned lands in both England and France, and served as Governor of Gisors during its surrender.

He is best known for his role in the incredibly quick surrender of the Château de Gisors as part of the 1193 French invasion of Normandy. King Richard I of England was originally betrothed to Princess Alys, King Phillip II of France's sister with a dowry of the Vexin. Richard later repudiated the marriage to marry Berengaria of Navarre, but managed to force Phillip to allow him to keep the dowry. Eventually, Phillip contested this, and while Richard was held captive by Leopold V, Duke of Austria he invaded Vexin. The keep of Gisors was described as "The key of the region" and was thus crucial to its defense. It fell so quickly under Gilbert's command that some chroniclers suspected foul play, and its fall perpetuated the loss of the entire Vexin region and later Normandy East of Rouen.

He had an unknown wife, with whom he had a daughter in around 1170, named Pétronille.
