= Philip II of France =

King of France from 1180 to 1223

Philip II 'Augustus'
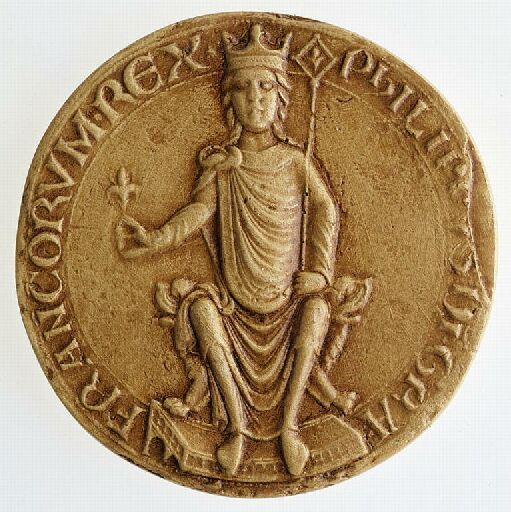
- The seal of Philip II. The legend reads: PHILLIPVS DEI GRATIA FRANCORVM REX (Philip, by the grace of God, king of the Franks)

King of the Franks/France (Note: According to Bernard Guenée, the style rex Francie is recorded since 1190, which is supported by several letters and documents. According to Dauvit Broun, the title was not officially adopted by the royal chancery until 1254, during the reign of king Louis IX. John W. Baldwin argues that Philip only ruled as rex Francorum, and that rex Francie was used in unofficial documents.)
- Reign: 18 September 1180 – 14 July 1223
- Coronation: 1 November 1179 (as co-king)
- Predecessor: Louis VII
- Successor: Louis VIII
- Born: 21 August 1165; Gonesse, France
- Died: 14 July 1223 (aged 57); Mantes-la-Jolie, France
- Burial: Basilica of St Denis
- Spouses: Isabella of Hainault (m. 1180; died 1190) Ingeborg of Denmark (m. 1193) Agnes of Merania (m. 1196; died 1201)
- Issue more...: Louis VIII; Marie, Duchess of Brabant; Philip I, Count of Boulogne; Pierre, Bishop of Noyon (ill.)
- House: Capet
- Father: Louis VII of France
- Mother: Adela of Champagne

Philip II (21 August 1165 – 14 July 1223), also known as Philip Augustus (French: Philippe Auguste), was King of France from 1180 to 1223. His predecessors had been known as kings of the Franks (Latin: rex Francorum), but from 1190 onward, Philip became the first French monarch to style himself "King of France" (rex Francie). The only son of King Louis VII and his third wife, Adela of Champagne, he was originally nicknamed 'God-given' (Dieudonné) because he was a first son and born late in his father's life. Philip was given the epithet "Augustus" by the chronicler Rigord for having extended the crown lands of France so remarkably.

After decades of conflicts with the House of Plantagenet, Philip succeeded in putting an end to the Angevin Empire by defeating a coalition of his rivals at the Battle of Bouvines in 1214. This victory had a lasting impact on western European politics: the authority of the French king became unchallenged, while John, King of England, was forced by his barons to assent to Magna Carta and deal with a rebellion against him aided by Philip's son Louis, the First Barons' War. The military actions surrounding the Albigensian Crusade helped prepare the expansion of France southward. Philip did not participate directly in these actions, but he allowed his vassals and knights to help carry them out.

Philip transformed France into the most prosperous and powerful state in Europe. He checked the power of the nobles and helped the towns free themselves from seigneurial authority, granting privileges and liberties to the emergent bourgeoisie. He built a great wall around Paris, "the Wall of Philip II Augustus", re-organised the French government, and brought financial stability to his realm.

== Early years ==
Philip was born in Gonesse on 21 August 1165, the son of Louis VII and Adela of Champagne. He was nicknamed "Dieudonné" (God-given) being the first born son, arriving late in his father's life. (Note: "Philip Augustus 'Dieudonné', [...] as this epithet demonstrates, was thought to have been given to Louis VII by God, because Louis had been married three times and had to wait many years for the birth of a son".) In 1173, the Emperor Frederick Barbarossa proposed to marry his daughter, Beatrice (born c. 1163), to Philip. The proposal was successfully opposed by Pope Alexander III, since at the time Barbarossa recognized a rival pope in Callixtus III.

Louis intended to make Philip co-ruler with him, in accordance with the traditions of the House of Capet, but these plans were delayed when Philip became ill after a hunting trip. His father went on pilgrimage to the shrine of Thomas Becket in Canterbury Cathedral to pray for Philip's recovery, and was told that his son had recovered. However, on his way back to Paris, the king suffered a stroke.

In declining health, Louis VII had 14-year-old Philip crowned and anointed as king at Reims on 1 November 1179 by Archbishop William of the White Hands. Philip was married on 28 April 1180 to Isabella of Hainault, the daughter of Count Baldwin V of Hainaut and Countess Margaret I of Flanders. Isabella brought the County of Artois as her dowry. The marriage was held at Bapaume, with the bishops of Senlis and Laon in attendance.

From the time of his coronation, all real power was transferred to Philip, as his father's health slowly declined. The great nobles were dissatisfied with Philip's advantageous marriage. His mother and four uncles, all of whom exercised enormous influence over Louis, were extremely unhappy with his attainment of the throne since Philip had taken the royal seal from his father. Louis died on 18 September 1180.

=== Consolidation of the royal demesne ===
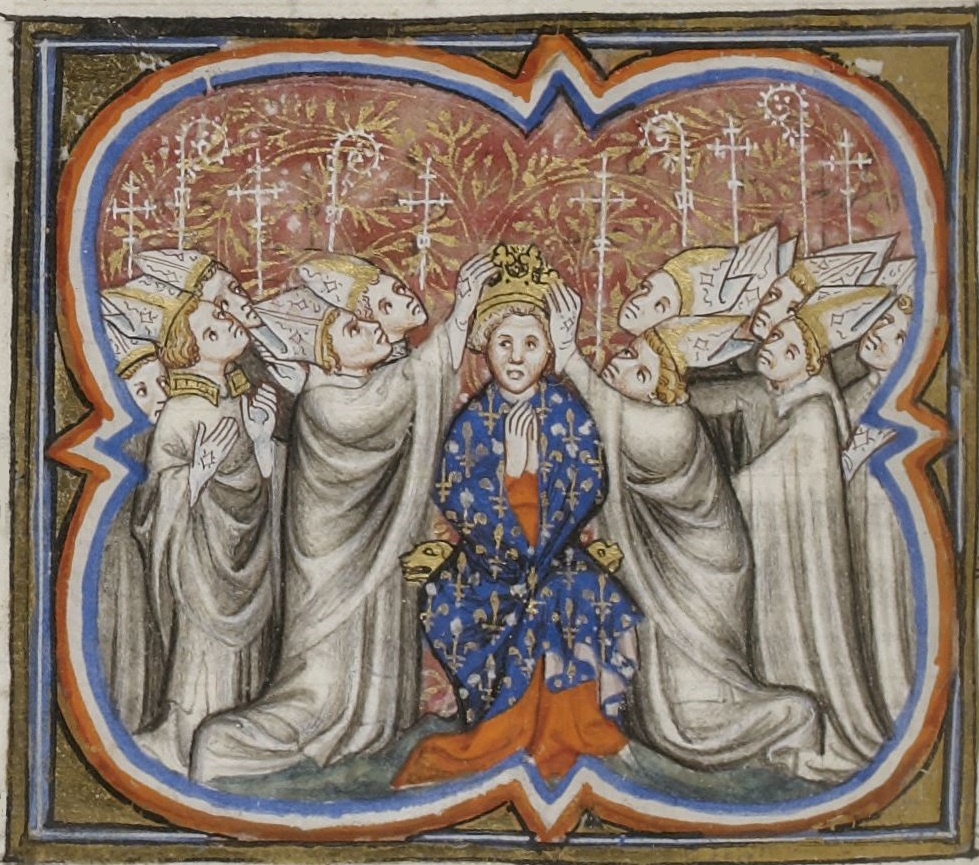
The coronation of Philip II Augustus, from the Grandes Chroniques de France, c. 1332–1350

The royal demesne had increased under Philip I and Louis VI, but had slightly diminished under Louis VII. The first major increase to the royal demesne came in 1185, when Philip acquired the County of Amiens. He purchased the County of Clermont-en-Beauvaisis in 1218, and following the death of Robert I, Count of Alençon, in 1219, Philip obtained the city and county of Alençon. Philip's eldest son, Louis, inherited the County of Artois in 1190, when Queen Isabella died.

=== Royal army ===
The main source of funding for Philip's army was the royal demesne. In times of conflict, he could immediately call up 250 knights, 250 horse sergeants, 100 mounted crossbowmen, 133 crossbowmen on foot, 2,000 foot sergeants, and 300 mercenaries. Towards the end of his reign, the king could muster some 3,000 knights, 9,000 sergeants, 6,000 urban militiamen, and thousands of foot sergeants. Using his increased revenues, Philip was the first Capetian king to build a French navy actively. By 1215, his fleet could carry a total of 7,000 men. Within two years, his fleet included 10 large ships and many smaller ones.

=== Expulsion of Jews ===
Reversing his father's tolerance and protection of Jews, Philip in 1180 ordered French Jews to be stripped of their valuables, ransomed and converted to Christianity on pain of further taxation. In April 1182, partially to enrich the French crown, he expelled all Jews from the demesne and confiscated their goods. Philip expelled them from the royal demesne in July 1182 and had Jewish houses in Paris demolished to make way for the Les Halles market. The measures were profitable in the short-term, the ransoms alone bringing in 15,000 marks and enriching Christians at the expense of Jews. Ninety-nine Jews were burned alive in Brie-Comte-Robert. In 1198, Philip allowed Jews to return.

=== Wars with his vassals ===
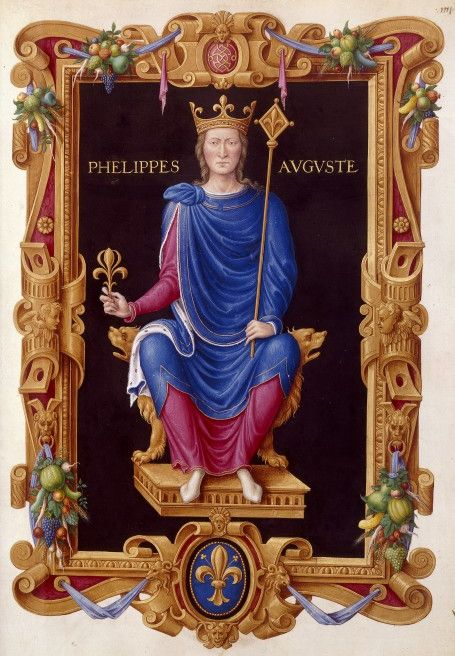
Philip II enthroned, portrait by Jean du Tillet, 1555–1566

In 1181, a conflict arose between Philip and Count Philip I of Flanders over the Vermandois, which King Philip claimed as his wife's dowry. The Count of Flanders invaded France, ravaging the whole district between the Somme and the Oise before penetrating as far as Dammartin. Notified of Philip's approach with 2,000 knights, he headed back to Flanders. Philip chased him, and the two armies confronted each other near Amiens.

By this stage, Philip had managed to counter the ambitions of the count by breaking his alliances with Duke Henry I of Brabant and the Archbishop of Cologne, Philipp von Heinsberg. This, together with an uncertain outcome were he to engage the French in battle, forced the Count to conclude a peace. In July 1185, the Treaty of Boves left the disputed territory partitioned, with Amiénois, Artois, and numerous other places passing to the king, and the remainder, with the county of Vermandois proper, left provisionally to the Count of Flanders. It was during this time that Philip II was nicknamed "Augustus" by the monk Rigord for augmenting French lands.

Meanwhile, in 1184, Stephen I, Count of Sancerre, and his Brabançon mercenaries ravaged the Orléanais. Philip defeated him with the aid of the Confrères de la Paix.

=== War with Henry II ===
A disagreement arose between Philip and King Henry II of England, who was also Count of Anjou and Duke of Normandy and Aquitaine in France. The death of Henry's eldest son, Henry the Young King, in June 1183, began a dispute over the dowry of Philip's widowed sister Margaret. Philip insisted that the dowry should be returned to France as the marriage did not produce any children, per the betrothal agreement. The two kings held conferences at the foot of an elm tree near Gisors, which was so positioned that it would overshadow each monarch's territory, but to no avail. Philip pushed the case further when King Béla III of Hungary asked for the widow's hand in marriage, and thus her dowry had to be returned, to which Henry finally agreed.

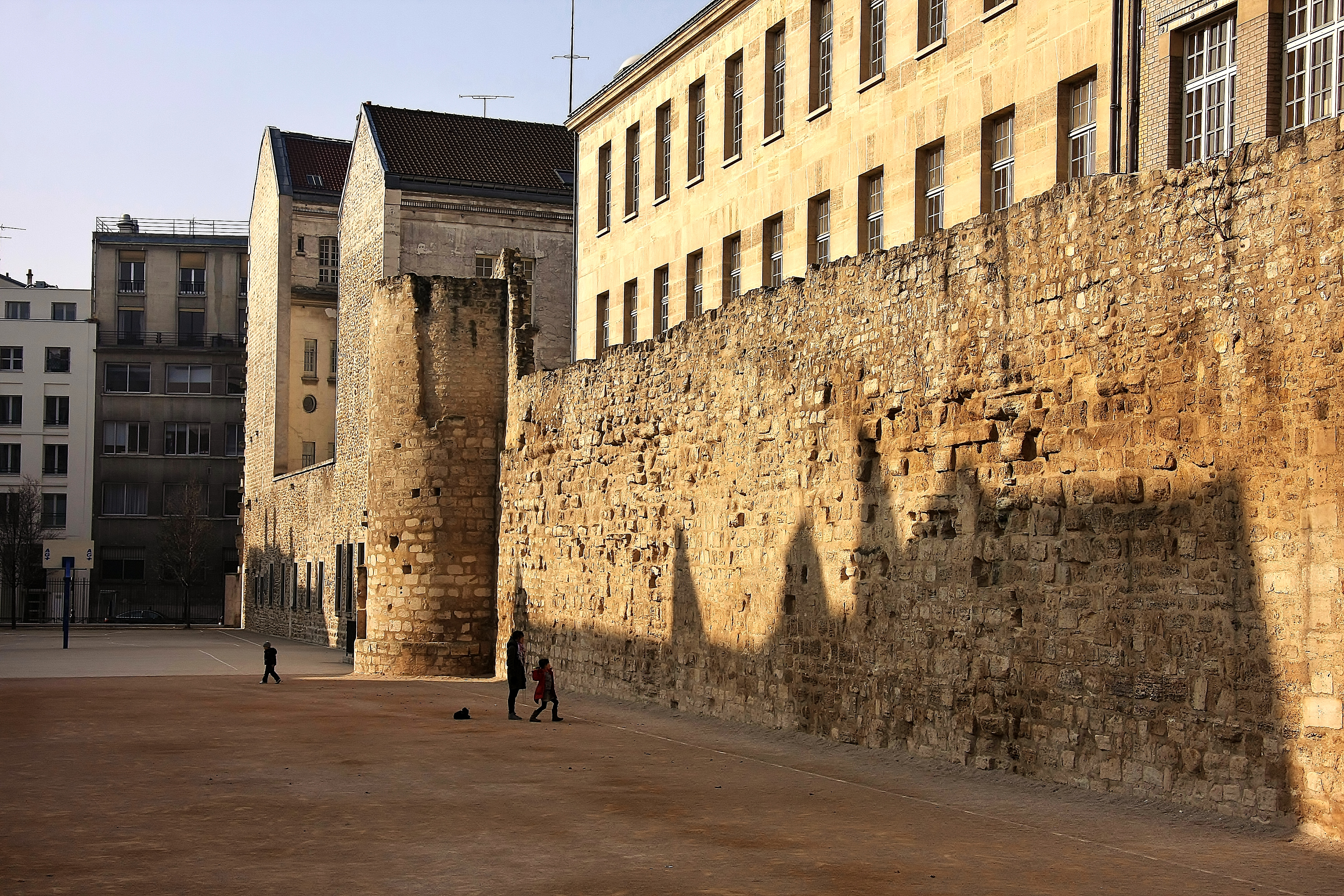
Remains of the Wall of Philip II Augustus built around Paris before he went to the Crusades. The segment pictured here is found in the rue des Jardins-Saint-Paul.

The death of Henry's fourth son, Geoffrey II, Duke of Brittany, began a new round of disputes, as Henry insisted that he retain the guardianship of the duchy for his unborn grandson Arthur I, Duke of Brittany. Philip, as Henry's liege lord, objected, stating that he should be the rightful guardian until the birth of the child. Philip then raised the issue of his other sister, Alys, Countess of Vexin, and her delayed betrothal to Henry's son Richard I of England, nicknamed Richard the Lionheart.

With these grievances, two years of combat followed (1186–1188), but the situation remained unchanged. Philip initially allied with Henry's young sons Richard the Lionheart and John, who were in rebellion against their father. The first attempt to seriously test Henry's resolve came when Philip II launched an attack on Berry in the summer of 1187 and captured the fortress of Issoudun.

In June, Philip made a truce with Henry, which left Issoudun in Philip's hands while also granting him Fréteval in Vendômois. Though the truce was for two years, Philip found grounds for resuming hostilities in the summer of 1188 and succeeded in seizing Châteauroux. He skillfully exploited the estrangement between Henry and Richard. Richard did homage to him voluntarily at Bonsmoulins in November 1188.

In 1189, as Henry's health was failing, Richard openly joined forces with Philip to drive him into submission. They chased him from Le Mans to Saumur, capturing Tours in the process, before forcing him to acknowledge Richard as his heir. By the Treaty of Azay-le-Rideau (4 July 1189), Henry was forced to renew his own homage, confirm the cession of Issoudun to Philip, along with Graçay, and renounce his claim to suzerainty over Auvergne. Henry died two days later. His death and the news of the fall of Jerusalem to Saladin, diverted attention from the Franco-English war.

The Angevin kings of England, the line of rulers to which Henry II belonged, were Philip's most powerful and dangerous vassals as Dukes of Normandy and Aquitaine and Counts of Anjou. Philip made it his life's work to destroy Angevin power in France. One of his most effective tools was to befriend all of Henry's sons and use them to foment rebellion against their father. He maintained friendships with Henry the Young King and Geoffrey, Duke of Brittany until their deaths. At Geoffrey's funeral, he was so overcome with grief that he had to be forcibly restrained from casting himself into the grave. He broke off his friendships with Henry's other sons Richard and John as each ascended to the English throne.

== Third Crusade ==
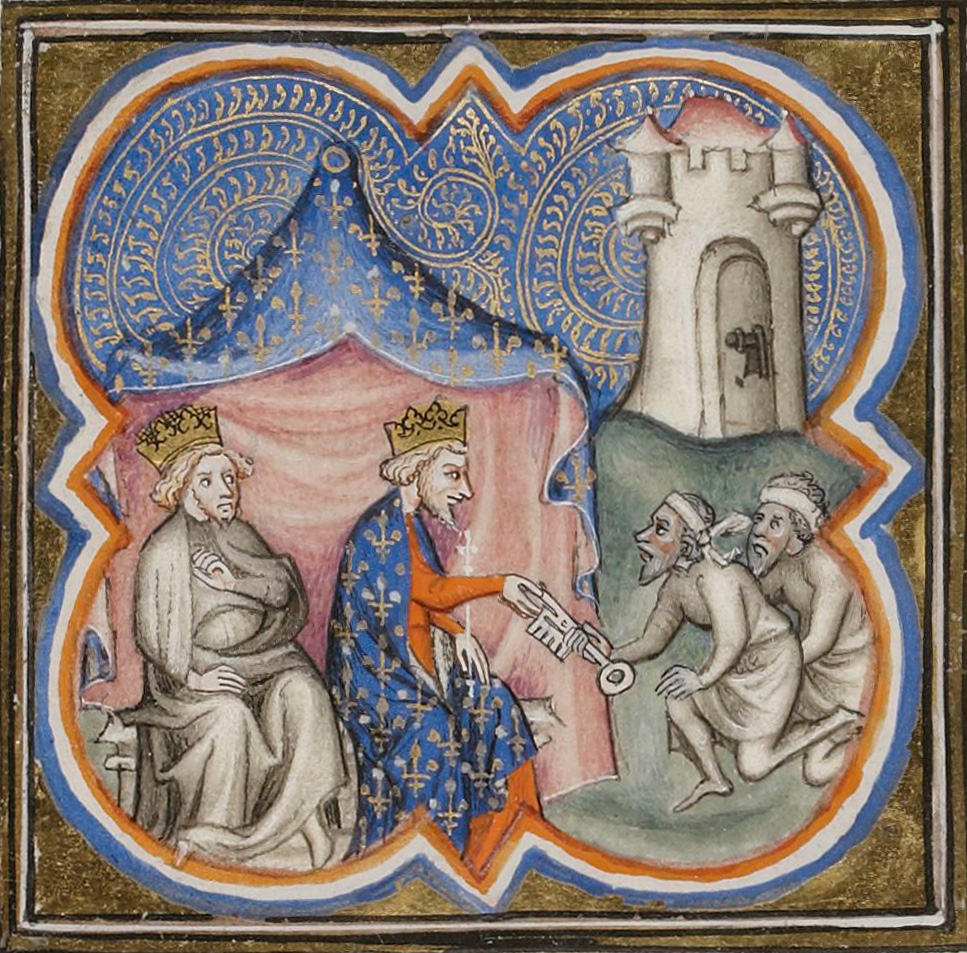
Philip (centre) and King Richard I of England accepting the keys to Acre, illumination on parchment, c. 1375–1380, from the Grandes Chroniques de France in the Bibliothèque nationale de France

Philip travelled to the Holy Land to participate in the Third Crusade of 1189–1192 with King Richard I of England and Holy Roman Emperor Frederick I Barbarossa, leaving Vézelay with his army on 4 July 1190. At first, the French and English crusaders travelled together, but the armies split at Lyon after Richard decided to go by sea from Marseille, whereas Philip took the overland route through the Alps to Genoa. The French and English armies were reunited in Messina, where they wintered together.

On 30 March 1191, the French set sail for the Holy Land and on 20 April Philip arrived at Acre, which was already under siege by a lesser contingent of crusaders, and he started to construct siege equipment before Richard arrived on 8 June. By the time Acre surrendered on 12 July, Philip was severely ill with dysentery, which reduced his zeal. Ties with Richard were further strained after Richard acted in a haughty manner after Acre fell to the crusaders.

More importantly, the siege of Acre resulted in the death of Philip, Count of Flanders, who held the county of Vermandois proper. His death threatened to derail the Treaty of Gisors that Philip had orchestrated to isolate the powerful Blois-Champagne faction. Philip decided to return to France to settle the issue of succession in Flanders, a decision that displeased Richard, who said, "It is a shame and a disgrace on my lord if he goes away without having finished the business that brought him hither. But still, if he finds himself in bad health, or is afraid lest he should die here, his will be done."

On 31 July 1191, the French army of 10,000 men, with 5,000 silver marks to pay the soldiers, remained in Outremer under the command of Duke Hugh III of Burgundy. Philip and his cousin Peter of Courtenay, Count of Nevers, made their way to Rome, where Philip protested to Pope Celestine III, to no avail, of Richard's abusive manner, and from there returned to France. The decision to return was also fuelled by the realization that with Richard campaigning in the Holy Land, English possessions in northern France would be open to attack. After Richard's delayed return home, the war between England and France ensued over the possession of English-controlled territories.

== Conflict with England, Flanders and the Holy Roman Empire ==
=== Conflict with Richard the Lionheart, 1191–1199 ===
The immediate cause of Philip's conflict with Richard the Lionheart stemmed from Richard's decision to break his betrothal with Philip's sister Alys at Messina in 1191. Some of Alys's dowry that had been given over to Richard during their engagement was part of the territory of Vexin. This should have reverted to Philip upon the end of the betrothal, but Philip, to prevent the collapse of the Crusade, agreed that this territory was to remain in Richard's hands and would be inherited by his male descendants. Should Richard die without an heir, the territory would return to Philip, and if Philip died without an heir, those lands would be considered a part of Normandy.

Returning to France in late 1191, Philip began plotting to find a way to have those territories restored to him. He was in a difficult situation, as he had taken an oath not to attack Richard's lands while he was away on a crusade. The Third Crusade ordained territory under the protection of the Church in any event. Philip was unsuccessful in requesting a release from his oath from Pope Celestine III, so he was forced to build his own casus belli.

On 20 January 1192, Philip met William FitzRalph, Richard's seneschal for Normandy. Presenting some documents purporting to be from Richard, Philip claimed that the English king had agreed at Messina to hand disputed lands over to France. Not having heard anything directly from their sovereign, FitzRalph and the Norman barons rejected Philip's claim to Vexin. Philip at this time also began spreading rumours about Richard's action in the east to discredit the English king in the eyes of his subjects. Among the stories Philip invented included Richard being involved in treacherous communication with Saladin, alleging he had conspired to cause the fall of Gaza, Jaffa, and Ascalon, and that he had participated in the murder of Conrad of Montferrat. Finally, Philip made contact with John, Richard's brother, whom he convinced to join the conspiracy to overthrow the legitimate king of England.

At the start of 1193, John visited Philip in Paris, where he paid homage for Richard's continental lands. When word reached Philip that Richard had finished crusading and had been captured on his way back from the Holy Land, he promptly invaded Vexin. His first target was the fortress of Gisors, commanded by Gilbert de Vascoeuil, which surrendered without putting up a struggle. Philip then penetrated deep into Normandy, reaching as far as Dieppe. To keep the duplicitous John on his side, Philip entrusted him with the defence of the town of Évreux. Meanwhile, Philip was joined by Count Baldwin IX of Flanders, and together they laid siege to Rouen, the ducal capital of Normandy. Here, Philip's advance was halted by a defence led by the Earl of Leicester. Unable to penetrate this defence, Philip moved on.

At Mantes on 9 July 1193, Philip came to terms with Richard's ministers, who agreed that Philip could keep his gains and would be given some extra territories if he ceased all further aggressive actions in Normandy, along with the condition that Philip would hand back the captured territory if Richard would pay homage. To prevent Richard from spoiling their plans, Philip and John attempted to bribe Holy Roman Emperor Henry VI in order to keep the English king captive for a little while longer. Henry refused, and Richard was released from captivity on 4 February 1194. By 13 March Richard had returned to England, and by 12 May he had set sail for Normandy with some 300 ships, eager to engage Philip in war.

Philip had spent this time consolidating his territorial gains and by now controlled much of Normandy east of the Seine, while remaining within striking distance of Rouen. His next objective was the castle of Verneuil, which had withstood an earlier siege. Once Richard arrived at Barfleur, he soon marched towards Verneuil. As his forces neared the castle, Philip, who had been unable to break through, decided to strike camp. Leaving a large force behind to prosecute the siege, he moved off towards Évreux, which John had handed over to his brother to prove his loyalty. Philip retook the town and sacked it, but during this time, his forces at Verneuil abandoned the siege, and Richard entered the castle unopposed on 30 May. Throughout June, while Philip's campaign ground to a halt in the north, Richard was taking a number of important fortresses to the south. Philip, eager to relieve the pressure off his allies in the south, marched to confront Richard's forces at Vendôme. Refusing to risk everything in a major battle, Philip retreated, only to have his rear guard caught at Fréteval on 3 July. This Battle of Fréteval turned into a general encounter in which Philip barely managed to avoid capture as his army was put to flight in a rout. Fleeing back to Normandy, Philip avenged himself on the English by attacking the forces of John and the Earl of Arundel, seizing their baggage train. By now both sides were tiring, and they agreed to the temporary Truce of Tillières.

The war resumed in 1195 when Philip once again besieged Verneuil. He continued the siege in secret as Richard arrived to negotiate in person; when Richard found out, he swore revenge and left. Philip now pressed his advantage in northeastern Normandy, where he conducted a raid at Dieppe, burning the English ships in the harbor while repulsing a counterattack at the same time. Philip then marched southward into the Berry region. His primary objective was the fortress of Issoudun, which had just been captured by Richard's mercenary commander, Mercadier. The French king took the town and was besieging the castle when Richard stormed through French lines and made his way in to reinforce the garrison, while at the same time, another army was approaching Philip's supply lines. Philip called off his attack, and another truce was agreed; the Treaty of Louviers.

The war slowly turned against Philip over the course of the next three years. Political and military conditions seemed promising at the start of 1196 when Richard's nephew Arthur I, Duke of Brittany ended up in Philip's hands, and he won the Siege of Aumale, but Philip's good fortune did not last. Richard won over a key ally, Baldwin of Flanders, in 1197. The same year, the Holy Roman Emperor Henry VI died and was succeeded by Otto IV, Richard's nephew, who put additional pressure on Philip. Finally, many Norman lords were switching sides and returning to Richard's camp. This was the state of affairs when Philip launched his campaign of 1198 with an attack on Vexin that was pushed back and then compounded by the Flemish invasion of Artois which diverted his attention elsewhere.

On 27 September, Richard entered Vexin, taking Courcelles-sur-Seine and Boury-en-Vexin before returning to Dangu. Philip, believing that Courcelles was still holding out, went to its relief. Discovering what was happening, Richard decided to attack the French king's forces, catching Philip by surprise. Philip's forces withdrew and attempted to reach the fortress of Gisors. Bunched together, the French knights with king Philip attempted to cross the Epte River on a bridge that promptly collapsed under their weight, almost drowning Philip in the process. He was dragged out of the river and shut himself up in Gisors.

Philip ordered the fortress to be reinforced and soon planned a new offensive, launching raids into Normandy and again targeting Évreux which he captured and sacked. Richard countered Philip's thrust with a successful counterattack in Vexin, while Mercadier led a raid on Abbeville. By autumn 1198, Richard had regained almost all that had been lost in 1193. With the warring sides in a deadlock, Philip extended a truce so that discussions could begin towards a more permanent peace, with the offer that he would return all of the territories except for Gisors.

In mid-January 1199, the two kings met for a final meeting, Richard standing on the deck of a boat, and Philip standing on the banks of the Seine River. Shouting terms at each other, they could not reach an agreement on the terms of a permanent truce, but they did agree to further mediation, which resulted in a five-year truce that held. Later in 1199, Richard was killed during a siege involving one of his vassals.

=== Conflict with John of England, 1200–1206 ===
In May 1200, Philip signed the Treaty of Le Goulet with Richard's successor John. The treaty was meant to bring peace to Normandy by settling the issue of its much-reduced boundaries. The terms of John's vassalage were not only for Normandy, but also for Anjou, Maine, and Touraine. John agreed to heavy terms, including the abandonment of all the English possessions in Berry and 20,000 marks of silver.

Philip in turn recognized John as king of England, formally abandoning Arthur of Brittany's candidacy, whom he had hitherto supported, recognizing instead John's suzerainty over the Duchy of Brittany. To seal the treaty, a marriage between Blanche of Castile, John's niece, and Louis the Lion, Philip's son, was contracted.

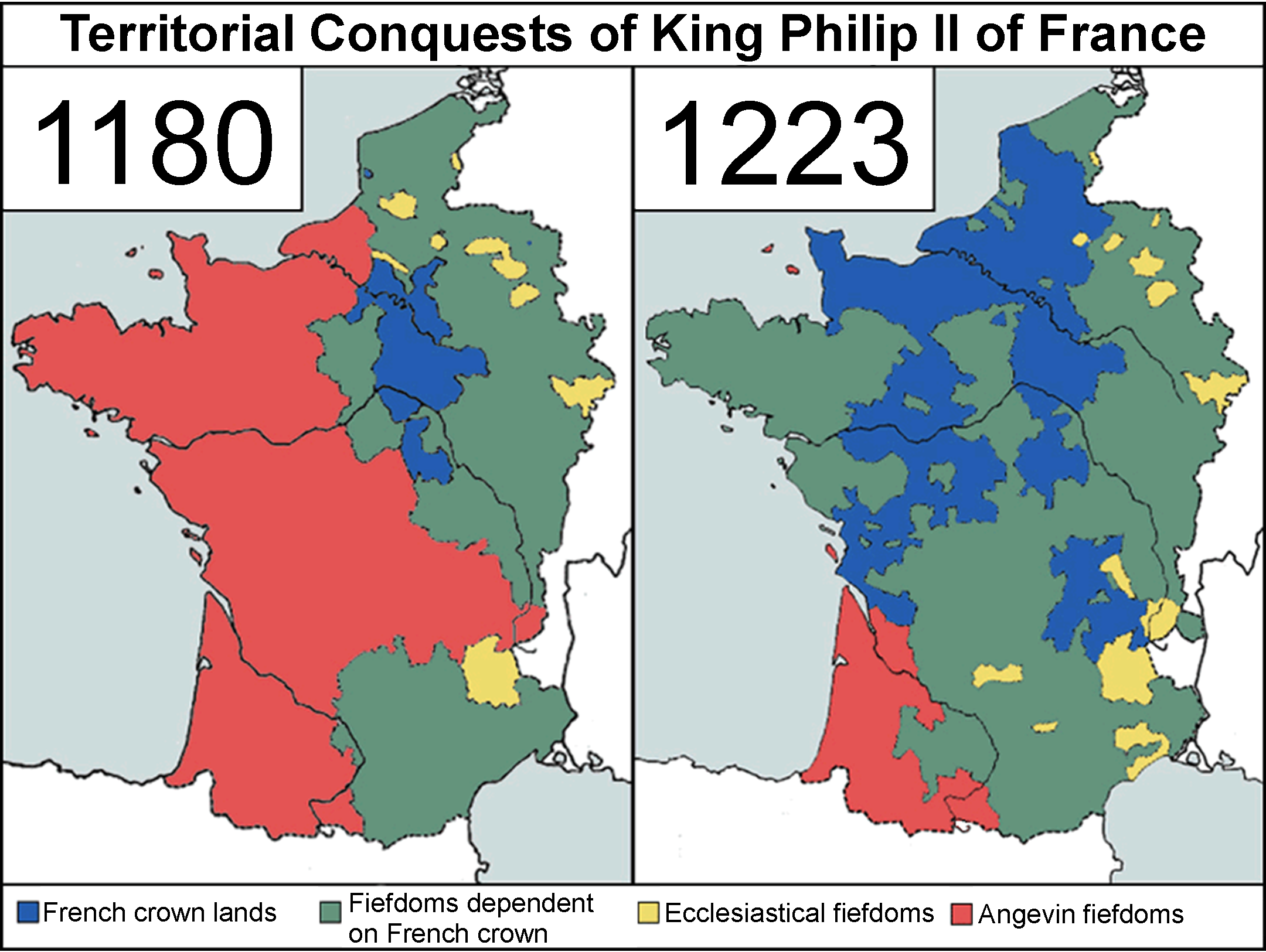
Territorial conquests of Philip II

This agreement did not bring warfare to an end in France, since John's mismanagement of Aquitaine led the province to rebel later in 1200, a disturbance that Philip secretly encouraged. To disguise his ambitions, Philip invited John to a conference at Andely and then entertained him at Paris. Both times he committed to complying with the treaty. In 1202, disaffected patrons petitioned the French king to summon John to answer their charges in his capacity as John's feudal lord in France. John refused to appear, so Philip again took up Arthur of Brittany's claims to the English throne as well as betrothing him to his six-year-old daughter Marie. In retaliation, John crossed over into Normandy and his forces soon captured Arthur, presumably as well as Arthur's sister Eleanor.

In 1203, Arthur disappeared, with most people believing that John had had him murdered. The outcry over Arthur's fate saw an increase in local opposition to John, which Philip used to his advantage. He took to the offensive and, apart from a five-month siege of Andely, swept all before him. After Andely surrendered, John fled to England. By the end of 1204, most of Normandy and the Angevin lands, including much of Aquitaine, had fallen into Philip's hands. Philip requested John release Eleanor of Brittany, claiming that she was to be his daughter-in-law, but to no avail.

What Philip had gained through victory in war, he sought to confirm by legal means. Philip, again acting as John's liege lord over his French lands, summoned him to appear before the Court of the Twelve Peers of France to answer for Arthur's murder. John requested safe conduct, but Philip only agreed to allow him to come in peace, while providing for his return only if it were allowed after the judgment of his peers.

Not willing to risk his life on such a guarantee, John refused to appear, so Philip summarily dispossessed the English of all lands. Pushed by his barons, John eventually launched an invasion of northern France in 1206, disembarking with his army at La Rochelle during one of Philip's absences, but the campaign ended in disaster. After backing out of a conference that he himself had demanded, John eventually bargained at Thouars for a two-year truce, the price being his agreement to the chief provisions of the judgment of the Court of Peers, including a loss of his patrimony.

=== Alliances against Philip, 1208–1213 ===
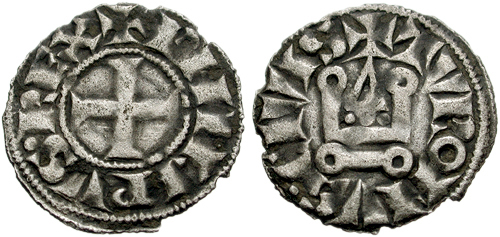
A Denier tournois coin of Philip II

In 1208, Philip of Swabia, the successful candidate to become Holy Roman Emperor, was assassinated. As a result, the imperial crown was given to his rival Otto IV, the nephew of King John. Otto, prior to his accession, had promised to help John recover his lost possessions in France, but circumstances prevented him from making good on his promise. By 1212, both John and Otto were engaged in power struggles against Pope Innocent III: John over his refusal to accept the papal nomination for the archbishop of Canterbury, and Otto over his attempt to strip King Frederick II of Germany of the Kingdom of Sicily. Philip decided to take advantage of this situation, first in Germany, where he aided the German noble rebellion in support of the young Frederick. John immediately threw England's weight behind Otto. Philip now saw his chance to launch a successful invasion of England.

In order to secure the cooperation of all his vassals in his plans for the invasion, Philip denounced John as an enemy of the Church, thereby justifying his attack as motivated solely by religious scruples. He summoned an assembly of French barons at Soissons, which was well attended. The only exception was Count Ferdinand of Flanders, who refused out of anger over the loss of the towns of Aire and Saint-Omer that had been captured by Philip's son Louis the Lion. He would not participate in any campaign until he was restored to his ancient lands.

Philip was eager to prove his loyalty to Rome and thus secure papal support for his planned invasion, announced at Soissons a reconciliation with his estranged wife Ingeborg of Denmark, which the popes had been promoting. The barons fully supported his plan, and they all gathered their forces and prepared to join with Philip at the agreed rendezvous. Through all of this, Philip remained in constant communication with Pandulf Verraccio, the papal legate, who was encouraging Philip to pursue his objective.

Verraccio was also holding secret discussions with King John. Advising the English king of his precarious predicament, he persuaded John to abandon his opposition to papal investiture and agreed to accept the papal legate's decision in any ecclesiastical disputes as final. In return, the pope agreed to accept the Kingdom of England and the Lordship of Ireland as papal fiefs, which John would rule as the pope's vassal, and for which John would do homage to the pope.

No sooner had the treaty between John and the pope been ratified in May 1213 than Verraccio announced to Philip that he would have to abandon his expedition against John, since to attack a faithful vassal of the Holy See would be a mortal sin. Philip argued in vain that his plans had been drawn up with the consent of Rome, that his expedition was in support of papal authority that he only undertook on the understanding that he would gain a plenary indulgence. He had spent a fortune preparing for the expedition.

The papal legate remained unmoved, but Verraccio suggested an alternative. The Count of Flanders had denied Philip's right to declare war on England while King John was still excommunicated, and that his disobedience needed to be punished. Philip eagerly accepted the advice, and quickly marched at the head of his troops into the territory of Flanders.

=== Battle of Bouvines, 1214 ===
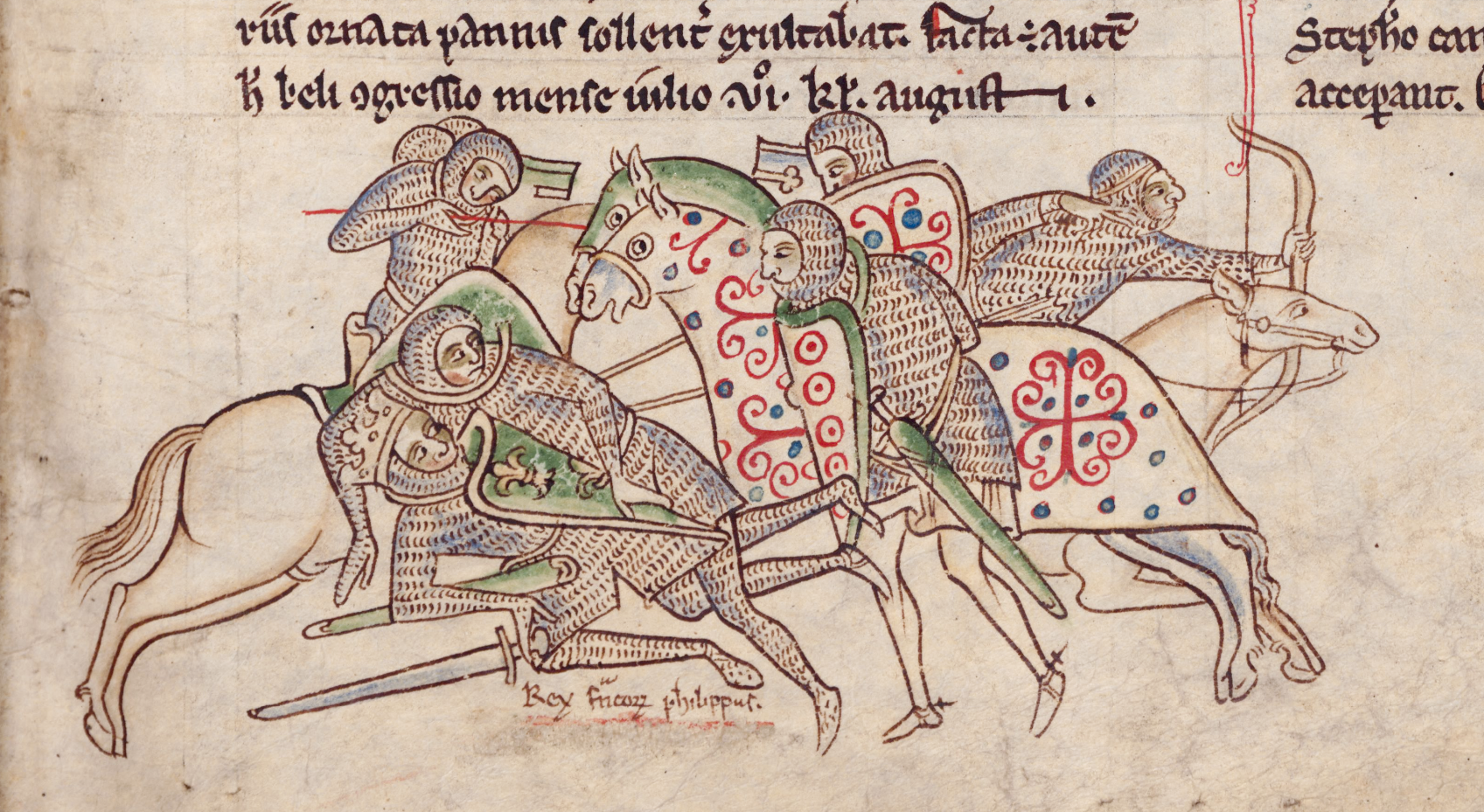
Philip II unhorsed at the Battle of Bouvines in 1214, from the Chronica Majora, c. 1250 by Matthew Paris

The French fleet proceeded first to Gravelines and then to the port of Damme. Meanwhile, the army marched by Cassel, Ypres, and Bruges before laying siege to Ghent. Hardly had the siege begun when Philip learnt that the English fleet had captured a number of his ships at Damme and that the rest were so closely blockaded in its harbour that it was impossible for them to escape. He ordered the fleet to be burned to prevent it from falling into enemy hands.

The destruction of the French fleet had once again raised John's hopes, so he began preparing for an invasion of France and a reconquest of his lost provinces. The English barons were initially unenthusiastic about the expedition, which delayed his departure, so it was not until February 1214 that he disembarked at La Rochelle.

John was to advance from the Loire, while his ally Otto IV made a simultaneous attack from Flanders, together with the Count of Flanders. The three armies did not coordinate their efforts effectively. It was not until John had been disappointed in his hope for an easy victory after being driven from Roche-au-Moine and had retreated to his transports that the Imperial Army, with Otto at its head, assembled in the Low Countries.

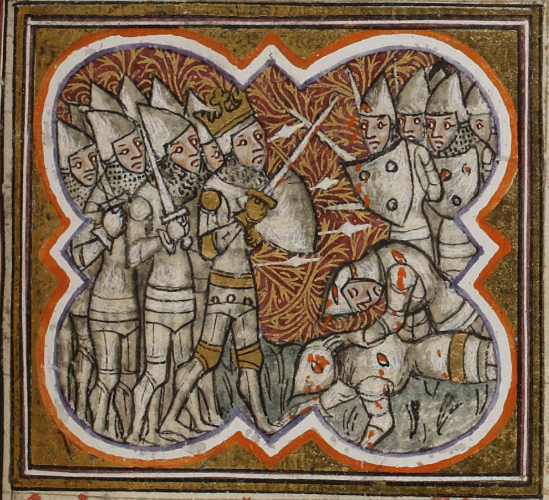
Philip II's victory at Bouvines, from the Grandes Chroniques de France, c. 1350–1375

On 27 July 1214, the opposing armies suddenly discovered that they were quite close to one another, on the banks of a little tributary of the River Lys, near the bridge at Bouvines, near Lille in southern Flanders. It being a Sunday, Philip did not expect the allied army to attack, as it was considered unholy to fight on the Sabbath. Philip's army numbered some 7,000, while the allied forces possessed around 9,000 troops.

The armies clashed at what became known as the Battle of Bouvines. Philip was unhorsed by the Flemish pikemen in the heat of battle, and were it not for his mail armor he would have probably been killed. When Otto was carried off the field by his wounded and terrified horse, and the Count of Flanders was severely wounded and taken prisoner, the Flemish and Imperial troops saw that the battle was lost, turned, and fled the field. The French did not pursue, as it was late in the day and nearly dark.

Philip returned to Paris triumphant, marching his captive prisoners behind him in a long procession, as his grateful subjects came out to greet the victorious king. In the aftermath of the battle, Otto retreated to his castle of Harzburg and was soon overthrown as Holy Roman Emperor, to be replaced by Frederick II. Count Ferdinand remained imprisoned following his defeat, while King John's attempt to rebuild the Angevin Empire ended in complete failure.

Philip's decisive victory was crucial in shaping Western European politics in both England and France. In England, the defeated John was so weakened that he was soon required to submit to the demands of his barons and sign Magna Carta, which limited the power of the crown and established the basis for common law. The Battle of Bouvines marked the end of the Angevin Empire.

== Marital problems ==
After the early death of Isabella of Hainault in childbirth in 1190, Philip decided to marry again. He decided on Ingeborg, daughter of King Valdemar I of Denmark, who received 10,000 marks of silver as a dowry. Philip met her at Amiens on 14 August 1193 and they were married that same day. At the feast of the Assumption of the Virgin, Archbishop Guillaume of Reims crowned both Philip and Ingeborg. During the ceremony, Philip was pale, nervous, and could not wait for the ceremony to end.

Following the ceremony, he had Ingeborg sent to the convent of Saint-Maur-des-Fosses and asked Pope Celestine III for an annulment on the grounds of non-consummation. Philip had not reckoned with Ingeborg. She insisted that the marriage had been consummated, and that she was his wife and the rightful queen of France. The Franco-Danish churchman William of Æbelholt intervened on Ingeborg's side, drawing up a genealogy of the Danish kings to disprove the alleged impediment of consanguinity.

In the meantime, Philip sought a new bride. Initial agreement was reached for him to marry Margaret, daughter of Count William I of Geneva, but the young bride's journey to Paris was interrupted by Thomas, Count of Savoy, who kidnapped Philip's intended new wife and married her instead, claiming that Philip was already bound in marriage. Philip achieved a third marriage in June 1196, when he was married to Agnes of Merania from Dalmatia. Their children were Marie and Philip, Count of Clermont.

Pope Innocent III declared Philip Augustus' marriage to Agnes of Merania null and void, as he was still married to Ingeborg. He ordered the king to part from Agnes, and when he did not, the pope placed France under an interdict in 1199. This continued until 7 September 1200. Due to pressure from the pope, Ingeborg's brother King Valdemar II of Denmark and Agnes' death in 1201, Philip took Ingeborg back as his wife, but it would not be until 1213 that she would be recognized at court as queen.

== Appearance and personality ==
The only known description of Philip describes him as "a handsome, strapping fellow, with a cheerful face of ruddy complexion, and a temperament much inclined towards good-living, wine, and women. He was generous to his friends, stingy towards those who displeased him, well-versed in the art of stratagem, orthodox in belief, prudent and stubborn in his resolves. He made judgments with great speed and exactitude. Fortune's favourite, fearful for his life, easily excited and easily placated, he was very tough with powerful men who resisted him, and took pleasure in provoking discord among them. Never, however, did he cause an adversary to die in prison. He liked to employ humble men, to be the subduer of the proud, the defender of the Church, and feeder of the poor".

== Issue ==
- By Isabella of Hainault:
  - Louis VIII (5 September 1187 – 8 November 1226), King of France (1223–1226); married Blanche of Castile and had issue.
  - Robert (twin) (born and died 14 March 1190) (Note: According to Catherine Hanley the twins were unnamed.)
  - Philip (twin) (14 March 1190 – 17 March 1190)
- By Agnes of Merania:
  - Marie (1198 – 15 August 1238); married firstly Philip I of Namur. Married secondly Henry I, Duke of Brabant, had issue.
  - Philip (July 1200 – 14/18 January 1234), Count of Boulogne by marriage; married Matilda II, Countess of Boulogne, and had issue.
- By a woman in Arras:
  - Pierre Charlot, bishop of Noyon.

== Later years ==
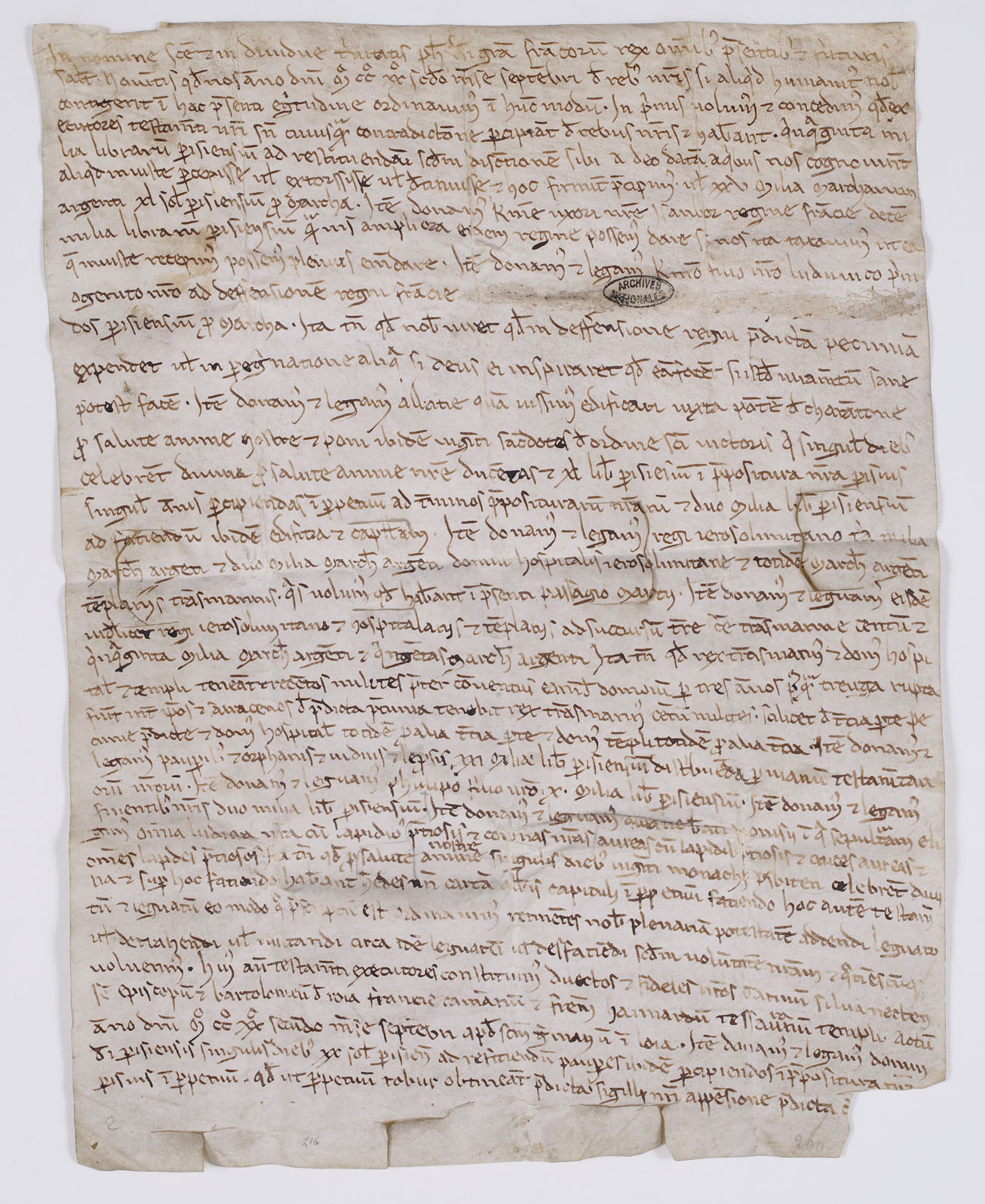
The will of Philip II, September 1222

When Pope Innocent III called for a crusade against the "Albigensians", or Cathars, in Languedoc in 1208, Philip did nothing to support it, (Note: "Eight months later, Honorius granted Philip one-half of the twentieth from France to secure his help for Simon [Montfort].") though he did not stop his nobles from joining in. The war against the Cathars did not end until 1244, when their last strongholds were finally captured. The fruits of the victory, the submission of the south of France to the crown, were to be reaped by Philip's son Louis VIII and grandson Louis IX. From 1216 to 1222, Philip also arbitrated in the War of the Succession of Champagne and finally helped the military efforts of Duke Odo III of Burgundy and Holy Roman Emperor Frederick II to bring it to an end.

Philip II Augustus played a significant role in one of the greatest centuries of innovation in construction and education in France. With Paris as his capital, he had the main thoroughfares paved, built a central market, Les Halles, continued the construction begun in 1163 of Notre-Dame de Paris, constructed the first incarnation of the Louvre as a fortress, and gave a charter to the University of Paris in 1200.

Under his guidance, Paris became the first city of teachers the medieval world knew. In 1224, the French poet Henry d'Andeli wrote of the great wine-tasting competition that Philip II Augustus commissioned, the Battle of the Wines.

Philip II fell ill in September 1222 and had a will made, but carried on with his itinerary. Traveling in hot weather the next summer resulted in a fever. The king recovered and felt well enough to resume his restless activity of touring his kingdom. The partial return of his health prompted him to travel to Paris on 13 July 1223, against the advice of his physician. The journey proved too much for him and he died en route the next day, in Mantes-la-Jolie, at the age of 57.

His body was carried to Paris on a bier. He was interred in the Basilica of St Denis in the presence of his son and successor, Louis VIII, and his illegitimate son Philip I, Count of Boulogne, and John of Brienne, the King of Jerusalem.

== Sources ==
- Babbitt, Susan M. (1985). Oresme's Livre de Politiques and the France of Charles V. American Philosophical Society. p. 39. ISBN 978-0-871-69751-6. OL 2874232M.
- Baldwin, John W. (1991). The Government of Philip Augustus: Foundations of French Royal Power in the Middle Ages. University of California Press. ISBN 0-5200-7391-6.
- Broun, Dauvit (2015). "Rethinking Scottish Origins". In Boardman, Steve; Foran, Susan (eds.). Barbour's Bruce and Its Cultural Contexts: Politics, Chivalry and Literature in Late Medieval Scotland. Boydell & Brewer. pp. 163–190. ISBN 978-1-843-84357-3. OL 28567359M.
- Bradbury, Jim (1997). Philip Augustus: King of France 1180–1223. The Medieval World. Routledge. ISBN 978-0-582-06059-3.
- Bradbury, Jim (2007). The Capetians: Kings of France, 987–1328. Hambledon Continuum. ISBN 978-1852855284.
- Claster, Jill N. (2009). Sacred Violence: The European Crusades to the Middle East, 1095–1396. University of Toronto Press. ISBN 978-1442600607.
- Cox, Eugene L. (1974). The Eagles of Savoy. Princeton University Press. ISBN 978-0691618418.
- Cuttino, George Peddy (1985). English Medieval Diplomacy. Indiana University Press.
- Demouy, Patrick (1998). "Henri de France et Louis VII: l'évêque cistercien et son frère le roi". Actes des congrès de la Société des historiens médiévistes de l'enseignement supérieur public. 29: 47–61.
- Duby, G. (1990). The Legend of Bouvines: War, Religion, and Culture in the Middle Ages. Univ of California Press. ISBN 0-5200-6238-8.
- Fawtier, Robert (1963). Capetian Kings of France Monarchy and Nation, 987–1328. Macmillan.
- Fegley, Randall (2002). The Golden Spurs of Kortrijk: How the Knights of France Fell to the Foot Soldiers of Flanders. McFarland & Company, Inc.
- Firnhaber-Baker, Justine (2024). House of Lilies: The Dynasty that made Medieval France. Basic Books. ISBN 9781541604759.
- Flori, Jean; Tucker, Spencer (2019). "King Philip II". In Tucker, Spencer C. (ed.). Middle East Conflicts from Ancient Egypt to the 21st Century: An Encyclopedia and Document Collection. ABC-CLIO. p. 999. ISBN 978-1-440-85352-4.
- Guenée, Bernard (1981). Politique et histoire au Moyen Age: recueil d'articles sur l'histoire politique et l'historiographie médiévale (1956–1981) (in French). FeniXX réédition numérique. ISBN 978-2-859-44048-0. OL 3068126M.
- Hallam, Elizabeth M (2014). Capetian France 987–1328. Taylor & Francis.
- Hanley, Catherine (2022). Two Houses, Two Kingdoms: A History of France and England, 1100–1300. Yale University Press.
- Hayes, Dawn Marie (2004). "Christian Sanctuary and Repository of France's Political Culture: The Construction of Holliness and Masculinity at the Royal Abbey of Saint-Denis, 987–1328". In Cullum, P.; Lewis, K. (eds.). Holiness and Masculinity in the Middle Ages. University of Wales Press. p. 135. ISBN 978-0-708-31894-2. OL 9655960M.
- Horne, Alistair (2004). La Belle France: A Short History. Alfred A. Knopf. ISBN 978-1-400-04140-4. OL 8362955M.
- Hosler, John D. (2007). Henry II, A Medieval Soldier at War, 1147–1189.
- Keefe, Thomas K. (2003). "Shrine Time: Henry II's Visits to Thomas Becket's Tomb". In Morillo, Stephen (ed.). The Haskins Society Journal Studies in Medieval History. Vol. 21. The Boydell Press. pp. 115–122.
- Meade, Marion (1977). Eleanor of Aquitaine: A Biography. New York: Hawthorn Books. ISBN 0-8015-2231-5.
- Moore, John C. (January 1962). "Count Baldwin IX of Flanders, Philip Augustus, and the Papal Power". Speculum. 37 (1): 79–89. doi:10.2307/2850600. JSTOR 2850600. S2CID 159905474.
- Morris, Marc (2015). King John: Treachery and Tyranny in Medieval England: The Road to Magna Carta. Pegasus Books. ISBN 978-1-605-98885-6.
- Nicholas, David M (2014). Medieval Flanders. Taylor & Francis.
- Payne, Robert (1984). The Dream and the Tomb: A History of the Crusades. New York: Stein and Day. ISBN 0-8128-2945-X.
- Petit-Dutaillis, C. (1999). The Feudal Monarchy in France and England. Translated by Hunt, E.D. Routledge.
- Pollock, M. A. (2015). Scotland, England and France After the Loss of Normandy, 1204–1296. The Boydell Press.
- Powell, James M. (1986). Anatomy of a Crusade, 1213-1221. University of Pennsylvania Press. ISBN 0-8122-1323-8.
- Rees, Simon (2006). "King Richard I of England Versus King Philip II Augustus". Military History (published September 2006). Archived from the original on 5 May 2008.
- Riehle, Alexander (2020). A Companion to Byzantine Epistolography. Brill.
- Richard, Jean (1983). "Philippe Auguste, la croisade et le royaume". Croisés, Missionaires et Voyageurs. Perspectives Orientales du Monde Latin Médiéval (in French). London: Variorum Collected Studies Series CS182.
- Stark, Rodney (2003). For the glory of God. Princeton University Press.
- Titterton, James (2025). Bouvines 1214: Philippe Augustus and the Battle for France. Oxford: Osprey Publishing. ISBN 9781472868824.
- Verbruggen, J. F. (1997) [1954]. De Krijgskunst in West-Europa in de Middeleeuwen, IXe tot begin XIVe eeuw [The Art of Warfare in Western Europe During the Middle Ages: From the Eighth Century to 1340]. Translated by Willard, S. (2nd ed.). Suffolk: Boydell Press. ISBN 0-8511-5630-4. OL 995963M.
- Wood, Charles T. (1966). The French Apanages and the Capetian Monarchy: 1224–1328. Harvard University Press.

Philip II of France House of Capet Born: 21 August 1165 Died: 14 July 1223
Regnal titles
Preceded by Louis VII	King of the Franks (King of France); 1179–1223 with Louis VII as senior king (1179–1180)	Succeeded by Louis VIII
