= Savigny-lès-Beaune wine =

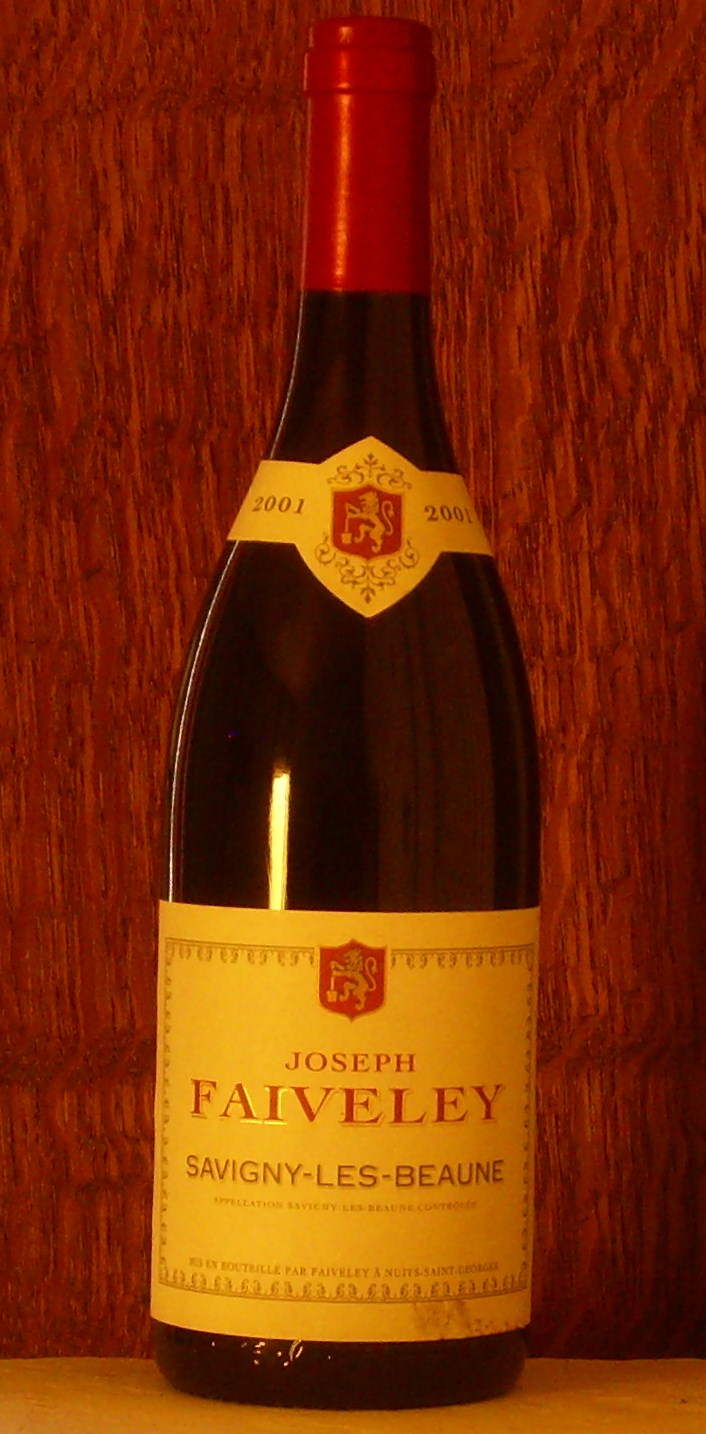
A bottle of Savigny-lès-Beaune wine.

Savigny-lès-Beaune wine is produced in the commune of Savigny-lès-Beaune in Côte de Beaune of Burgundy. The Appellation d'origine contrôlée (AOC) Savigny-lès-Beaune may be used for red and white wine with respectively Pinot noir and Chardonnay as the main grape variety. The name of the appellation is sometimes written simply as Savigny, without the -lès-Beaune suffix. The production consists of slightly over 85 per cent red wine, and slightly less than 15 per cent white wine. There are no Grand Cru vineyards within Savigny-lès-Beaune.

In 2008, there was 347.82 hectares (859.5 acres) of vineyard surface in production for Savigny-lès-Beaune wine at village and Premier Cru level, and 13,359 hectoliter of wine was produced, of which 11,443 hectoliter red wine and 1,916 hectoliter white wine. Some 249.96 hectares (617.7 acres) of this area was used for the red wines in 2007. The total amount produced corresponds to almost 1.8 million bottles, of which slightly over 1.5 million bottles of red wine and a little over 250,000 bottles of white wine.

For white wines, the AOC regulations allow both Chardonnay and Pinot blanc to be used, but most wines are 100% Chardonnay. The AOC regulations also allow up to 15 per cent total of Chardonnay, Pinot blanc and Pinot gris as accessory grapes in the red wines, but this is not very often practiced. The allowed base yield is 40 hectoliter per hectare of red wine and 45 hectoliter per hectare for white wine. The grapes must reach a maturity of at least 10.5 per cent potential alcohol for village-level red wine, 11.0 per cent for village-level white wine and Premier Cru red wine, and 11.5 per cent for Premier Cru white wine.

== Premiers Crus ==
There are 22 climats in Savigny-lès-Beaune classified as Premier Cru vineyards. The wines of these vineyards are designated Savigny-lès-Beaune Premier Cru + vineyard name, or may labelled just Savigny-lès-Beaune Premier Cru, in which case it is possible to blend wine from several Premier Cru vineyards within the AOC.

In 2007, 143.26 hectares (354.0 acres) of the total Savigny-lès-Beaune vineyard surface consisted of Premier Cru vineyards, of which 132.23 hectares (326.7 acres) red and 11.03 hectares (27.3 acres) white Savigny-lès-Beaune Premier Cru. The annual production of Premier Cru wine, as a five-year average, is 5,231 hectoliter of red wine and 440 hectoliter of white wine.

The climats classified as Premiers Crus are:

- Les Charnières
- Les Talmettes
- Les Vergelesses
- Bataillière
- Basses Vergelesses
- Aux Fourneaux
- Champ Chevrey
- Les Lavières
- Aux Gravains
- Petits Godeaux
- Aux Serpentières
- Aux Clous
- Aux Guettes
- Les Rouvrettes
- Les Narbantons
- Les Peuillets
- Les Marconnets
- La Dominode
- Les Jarrons
- Les Hauts Jarrons
- Redrescul
- Les Hauts Marconnets
