= Henry d'Andeli =

Henry d'Andeli was a 13th-century Norman poet notable for his work La Bataille des Vins (English Battle of the Wines), and for the satirical poem Battle of the Seven Arts. He also wrote Dit du Chancelier Philippe on the subject of his contemporary Philip the Chancellor.

The fabliau Lai d'Aristote, which was formerly ascribed to him, is now thought to be by Henry of Valenciennes.

== Battle of the arts ==
In his mock-epic battle (c1230-50), d'Andeli laments the defeat of rhetoric (represented by Grammar/Orléans) at the hands of Logic/Paris. Grammar is forced to flee to Egypt; and Poetry in the person of 'Sir Versifier' to the Loire countryside - d'Andeli predicting that "It will be thirty years before he dares show his face again".

== See also ==
- Bernardus Silvestris
- Goliard
- John of Garland
