= Vézelay =

- Commune
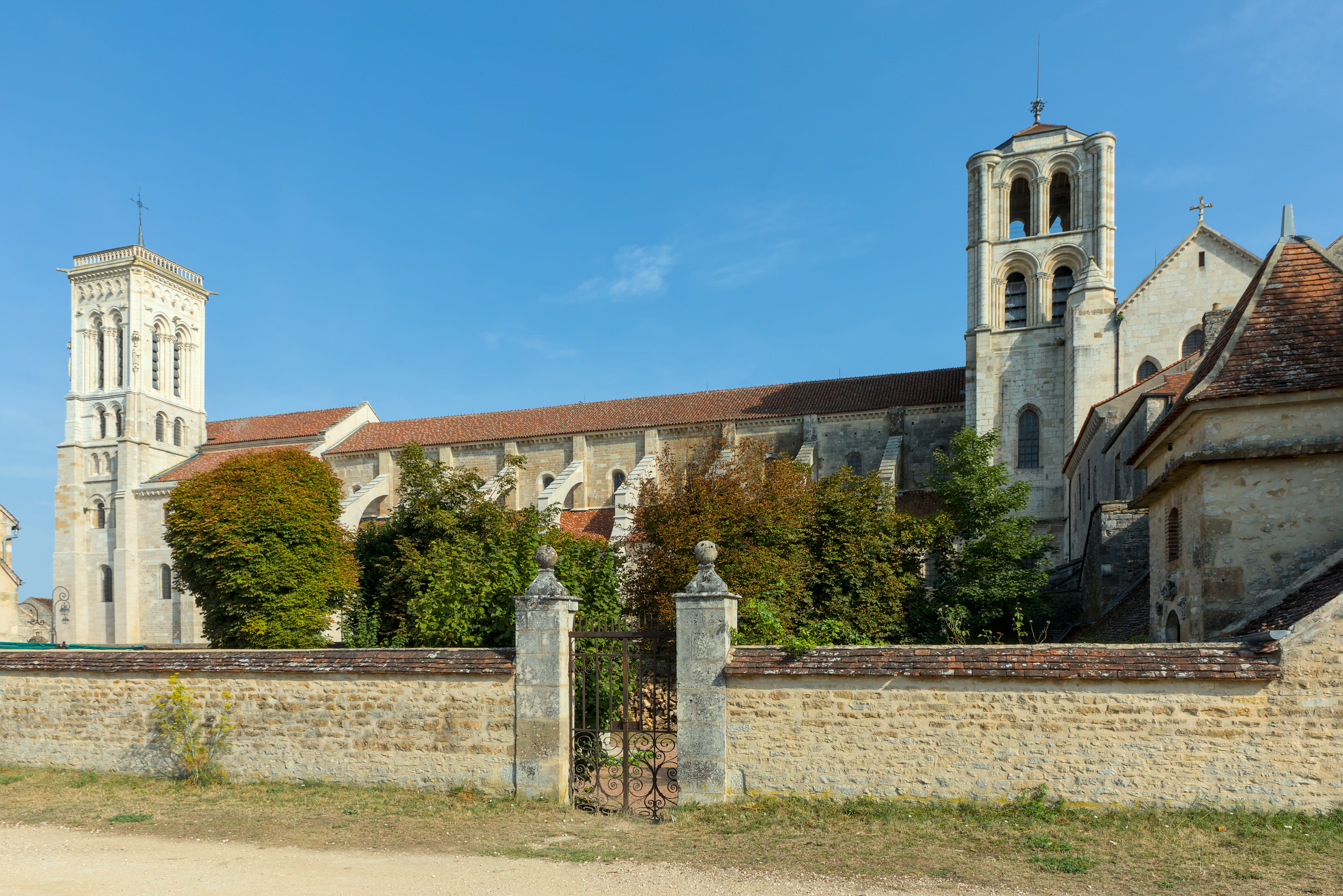
- Vézelay Abbey

- Coat of arms
- Location of Vézelay
- Location within France Location within Bourgogne-Franche-Comté
- Coordinates: 47°28′00″N 3°44′48″E
- Country: France
- Region: Bourgogne-Franche-Comté
- Department: Yonne
- Arrondissement: Avallon
- Canton: Joux-la-Ville

Government
  - Mayor (2020–2026): Hubert Barbieux
- Area^{1}: 21.83 km^{2} (8.43 sq mi)
- Elevation: 302 m (991 ft)
- Highest elevation: 339 m (1,112 ft)
- Lowest elevation: 170 m (560 ft)
- Population (2023): 476
  - Density: 21.8/km^{2} (56.5/sq mi)
- Time zone: UTC+01:00 (CET)
  - Summer (DST): UTC+02:00 (CEST)
- INSEE/Postal code: 89446 /89450
- ^{1} French Land Register data, which excludes lakes, ponds, glaciers > 1 km^{2} (0.386 sq mi or 247 acres) and river estuaries.

Vézelay (French: [vez(ə)lɛ]) is a commune in the department of Yonne in the north-central French region of Bourgogne-Franche-Comté. It is a defensible hill town famous for Vézelay Abbey. The town and its 11th-century Romanesque Basilica of St Magdalene are designated UNESCO World Heritage Sites.

== History ==
=== Ancient history ===
The first traces of human settlement in the vicinity of Vézelay date from 2300 to 2200 BC. near the sources of the Salt Fountains. In the first century and the second century, about two thousand mine shafts were mined in the south-west of Vezelay by about five hundred to eight hundred slaves. These mines allowed the creation of a center of economic activity (market), a refuge and probably a place of pilgrimage.

From the 1st century, the Romans set up the wine-growing on the hill of Vézelay. A temple in honor of Bacchus was discovered by the parish priest Guenot in 1689 in the foundations of the old church of Saint-Etienne during the construction of a new bell tower, which shows the importance of this culture in the region.

=== Middle Ages ===
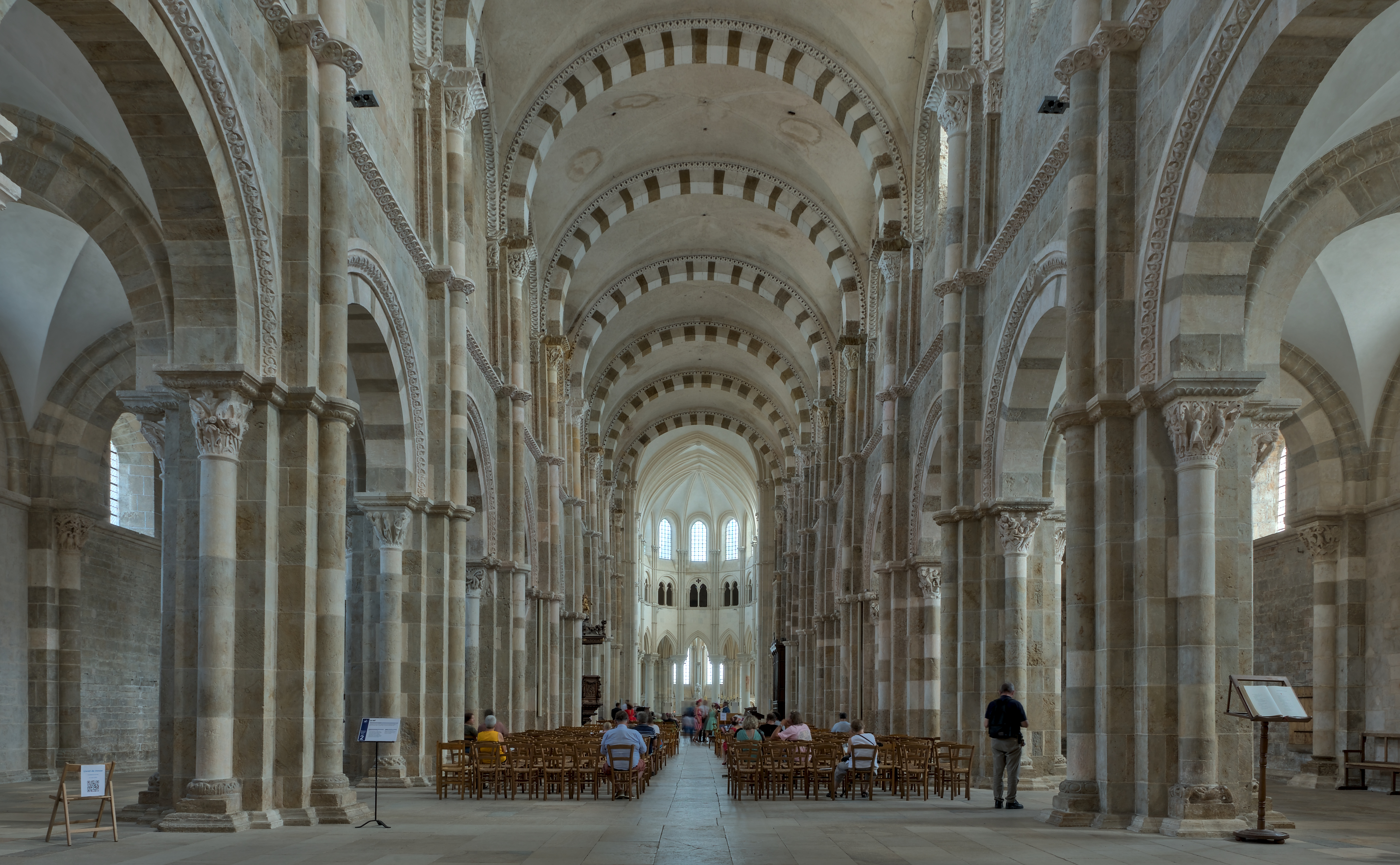
Vézelay Abbey

In the 9th century the Benedictines were given land to build a monastery during the reign of Charles the Bald. According to legend, not long before the end of the first millennium a monk named Baudillon brought relics of Mary Magdalene to Vézelay from Saint-Maximin-la-Sainte-Baume.

In 1058 Pope Stephen IX confirmed the authenticity of the relics, leading to an influx of pilgrims that has continued to this day. Vézelay Abbey was also a major starting point for pilgrims on the Way of St. James to Santiago de Compostela. This was crucially important in attracting pilgrims and the wealth they brought to the town.

Bernard of Clairvaux preached the Second Crusade at the Council of Vézelay in 1146 with King Louis VII of France. The crowd was so large that a large platform was erected on a hill outside the city. The full text has not survived, but a contemporary account says that "his voice rang out across the meadow like a celestial organ" When Bernard was finished the crowd enlisted en masse and they supposedly ran out of cloth to make crosses. Bernard is said to have flung off his own robe and began tearing it into strips to make more crosses. Others followed his example and he and his helpers were supposedly still producing crosses as night fell.

On 2 July 1190, the Frankish and English factions of the Third Crusade met at Vézelay before officially departing for the Holy Land.

The human settlement on the hill of Vézelay is very anterior to the Benedictine abbey. Merovingian sarcophagi were found in the basement of the church of St. Peter, and under one of them an older sarcophagus. In 2012, a Carolingian wall was discovered, under the cloister of Vézelay.

Girart de Roussillon received by a favor from Louis the Pious and chose in 858 to ensure the perenniality of his possessions by transforming them into two Benedictine communities, respectively male and female: Pothières and Vézelay. He founded a monastery of women at the present site of Saint-Père. It had a villa, surrounded by large estates. The neighborhood in which the houses were located bore the name of Vezeliacus, which became Vizeliac, then Vézelay.

This was a tenuous start, abruptly interrupted between 871 and 877, when the Normans dislodged the nuns. Girart then asks for their replacement by a community of men. The abbey was then transferred to the hill and Benedictine monks replaced the nuns. The position of the monastery attracted multiple families to take advantage of the protection of the walls of the new establishment. It was dedicated to the Virgin and the apostles St. Peter and St. Paul.

Its status is quite peculiar, for it was affiliated with Cluny, which was exempted until 1744:

"by paying the annual fee of one pound of silver to the Holy See, To recognize no chief of order, no diocesan bishop, no prince, no lord whatsoever. It forms a kind of theocratic republic, detached at first from the Carolingian monarchy, then from the French feudalism, and not preserving, either with one or the other, any connection or relationship of subordination."

Some authors assert that in 882 the monk Badilon had brought from Saint-Maximin-la-Sainte-Baume to Vézelay, relics of Mary Magdalene. On the other hand, Eudes, first abbot, is mentioned in 897.

=== The abbey of Vézelay ===
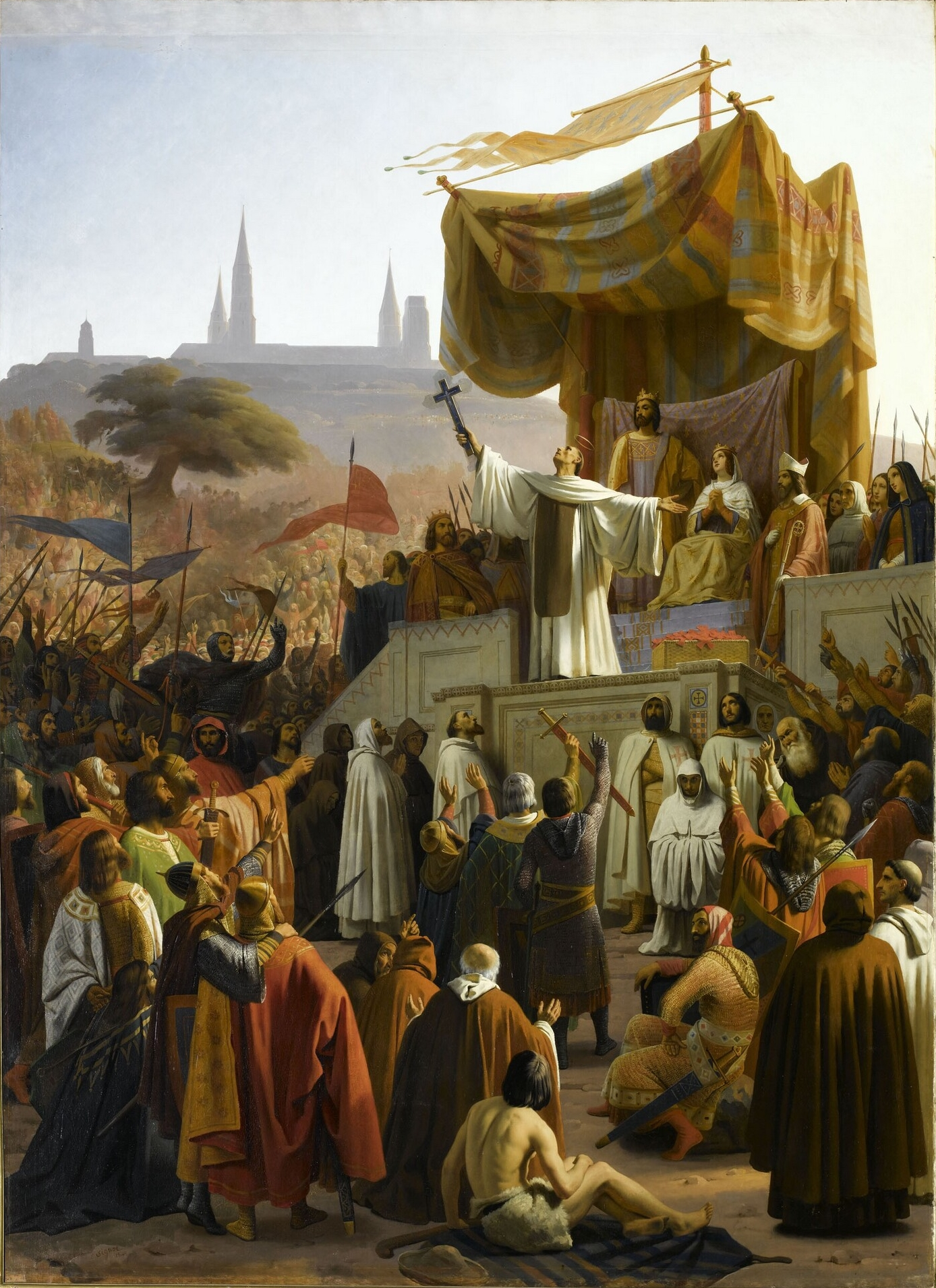
Saint Bernard of Clairvaux preaching the second crusade in Vézelay in 1146.

Elected in 1037, Abbot Geoffroy reformed the abbey and convinced his contemporaries that the abbey possessed the remains of Mary Magdalene: hence pilgrimages, offerings and donations.

Between the years 1050 and 1250, Vézelay was the largest Magdalenian sanctuary in Western Europe. This benefited the inhabitants naturally and the village became a small town. "Hence, among them, a spirit of independence, which monastic despotism irritated, and which soon manifested itself by bloody revolts, obstinate struggles". It would be necessary to wait for a pontifical bull to make Madeleine officially become the patroness of the abbey (1050). Such prosperity attracted Cluny, who submitted to Vezelay and appointed the Abbe Artaud.

In 1060, Vézelay obtained the right of commune.

In 1096, Urban II preached the first crusade; the construction of the abbey church was decided. It was consecrated in 1104. The abbe Artaud was assassinated in 1106. After multiple vicissitudes (revolts, seigneurial conflicts, the fire of 1120 caused by lightning), the narthex or Church of the Penitent Pilgrims was built: it was dedicated only in 1132. In 1137 the Abbe Albéric signed a charter with the inhabitants that defined the rights of the abbey and the bourgeois: an act of wisdom that was praised In laudatory terms by Bernard of Clairvaux.

In the twelfth century, Vézelay developed. Then, in 1146, Vézelay's reputation was such that Bernard de Clairvaux preached the second crusade at the place known as the Saint Bernard cross. The place of preaching was transformed into a commemorative church: there were still some ruins known as "La Cordelle". Abbé Ponce de Montbossier temporarily restored the abbey to its former privileges of independence ("pote, potestas Vezeliacensis"). The abbots received enormous prerogatives from the Vatican: the right to wear the mitre, the crosier, the ring and the sandals.

At the same time, the city continued its development and was fortified in 1150 with 2,000 meters of curtain wall and the construction of the Holy Cross gate. Then, the city obtained communal institutions in 1152, which were withdrawn in 1155 by Louis VII. After the revolt of 1167, the inhabitants obtained from the monks a written charter which guaranteed them liberties in the region ("libertas Vezeliacensis").

In 1190, Philippe Auguste and Richard Cœur de Lion met for the third crusade. The choir of the Romanesque church was rebuilt into a larger one. Abbe Hugues, a corrupt man, squandered the wealth of the abbey and was dismissed in 1207. The decline of the abbey began, coinciding with the decline of the monastic orders and that of the Benedictines in particular.

=== Decline of the abbey ===
Towards 1215, the abbey was completed, and the conflicts with the counts of Nevers resumed. The different popes and kings of France could do nothing to protect the religious community. The protection of the relics of the Madeleine seemed to be ineffective, and the pilgrims turned away from this troubled city by so many conflicts (such as the uprising of 1250). Pope Clement IV launched an inquiry to understand the reasons for such a forfeiture and ordered a solemn verification of the relics of the Madeleine. King St. Louis joined the ceremony (on 24 April 1267). But in 1279, the pope proclaimed that the body found at Saint-Maximin-la-Sainte-Baume was indeed the body of Mary Magdalene. The pilgrims turned away from Vézelay and prosperity left too.

In 1280, an ordinance signed by Philip the Bold proclaims the more or less complete attachment of Vezelay to the royal domain. Pope Martin IV approved the decree. With the Order of 1312, Philip the Fair confirmed that city and abbey are an ordinary dependency of the royal domain. The inhabitants understood that this authority allowed them to contain the abbatial independence, and to escape the brutalities of feudal lords. Vezelay enters the restricted circle of the towns of the kingdom (there were only 16).

In 1360, the wall was rebuilt and reinforced with round towers with machicolations.

On 27 July 1421 the troops of the Duke of Burgundy, Philippe Le Bon, await the army of rescue at Vézelay. They make their junction with the English contingents of King Henry V, commanded by his brother, the Duke of Bedford, John of Lancaster. The two armies gather 12,000 men and meet to counter the forces of the Dauphin Charles at La Charité-sur-Loire.

Abbot Hugues de Maison-Comte, an adviser to Charles V, is known for his fairness in his relations with the inhabitants of Vézelay (1353–1383), and Abbé Alexandre, adviser to Philippe Le Bon for his diplomatic role. He exhorted the Vezelians to leave the Anglo-Burgundian league and contributed to the rapprochement between Philip the Good and Charles VII and led to the meeting of the Council of Basel in 1431. Finally, he participated in the elaboration of the Pragmatic Sanction of Bourges in 1438.

Louis XI did not tolerate the abbots being bound to the Duke of Burgundy, Charles the Bold. In order to secure a stronghold, he brutally imposed one of his courtiers, Pierre de Balzac. The New Gate of Vézelay built at the end of the 15th century and where the sites are still visible.

At the end of the 15th century, a new door was built in the precincts: the Porte Neuve. The latter is defended by two round towers about twelve meters in diameter with walls three meters thick, and two harrows are added to the door in order to be able to prohibit access.

In 1538, a bull granted what the monks long demanded: namely secularization. The abbey becomes a simple collegiate church, a chapter of canons replaces the Benedictine monks and especially the domain is placed in the hands of commendatory abbots. Francis I tried in vain to get Vezelay to become a bishopric.

The bull of 1541 was registered by the Parlement of Paris only in 1653. It bore only insufficient income and favored the commendatory abbots.

=== Wars of religion ===
During the wars of religion, the abbots made a strong place of the Protestant League. Under the influence of Theodore de Beze, the abbey made Vézelay one of the first towns of the region allied to Protestantism. In March 1569, the town was taken by the Protestant troops of Captains Sarrasin and Blosset, anxious to win a good military position.

The city was soon besieged by the armies of Charles IX commanded by Louis Prevost of Sansac. The cavalry was launched on Vézelay on October 6, but the captains entrenched in the city defended themselves by attacking in their turn. The bombings since Asquins and Saint-Père yielded nothing. The siege turned into a blockade to starve the city. The city did not surrender despite eight months of siege and intense fighting, thanks to a supply of relief from Protestant troops. Sansac lifted the camp, leaving the city untaken, on 25 February 1570.

At the treaty of Saint-Germain (1570), Vézelay was one of the two towns of the government of Champagne to authorize the Protestants to freely exercise their worship.

In 1594 Edme de Rochefort, Sieur de Pluvault, who governed the city in the name of the League, gave the place to Henri IV and took the lead of the royalist troops to take Avallon.

== Wine ==
Vézelay is the local wine appellation. Vineyards descend to the edge of the town and produce only white wines, made exclusively of the Chardonnay grape variety. About half of the production is marketed through the Cave Henry co-operative. The vineyards are believed to have been established by the Monastery in the ninth century. In the late nineteenth century the vineyards were decimated by phylloxera. The vineyards were revived during the 1970s.

== Gallery ==
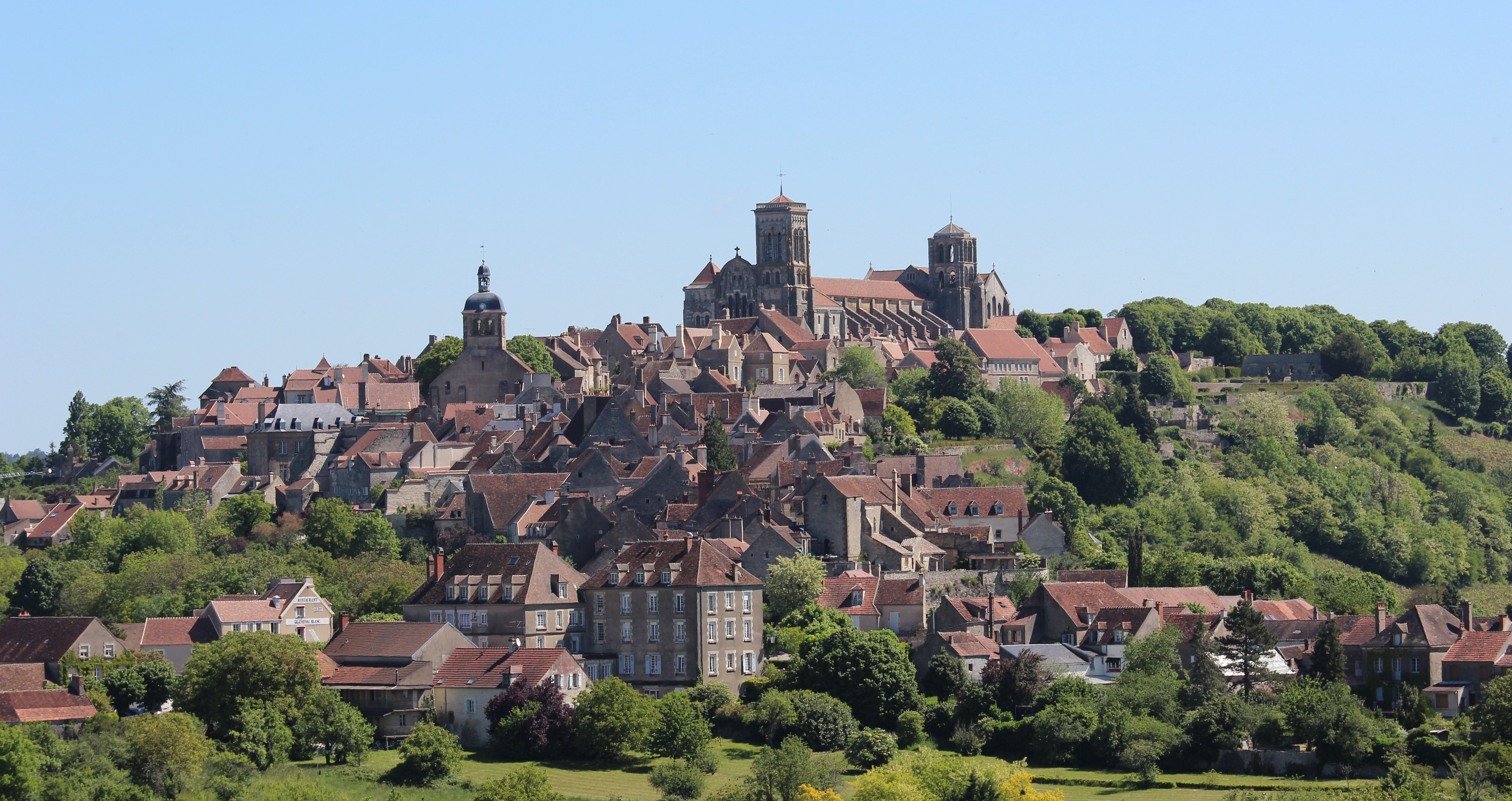
General view of the town

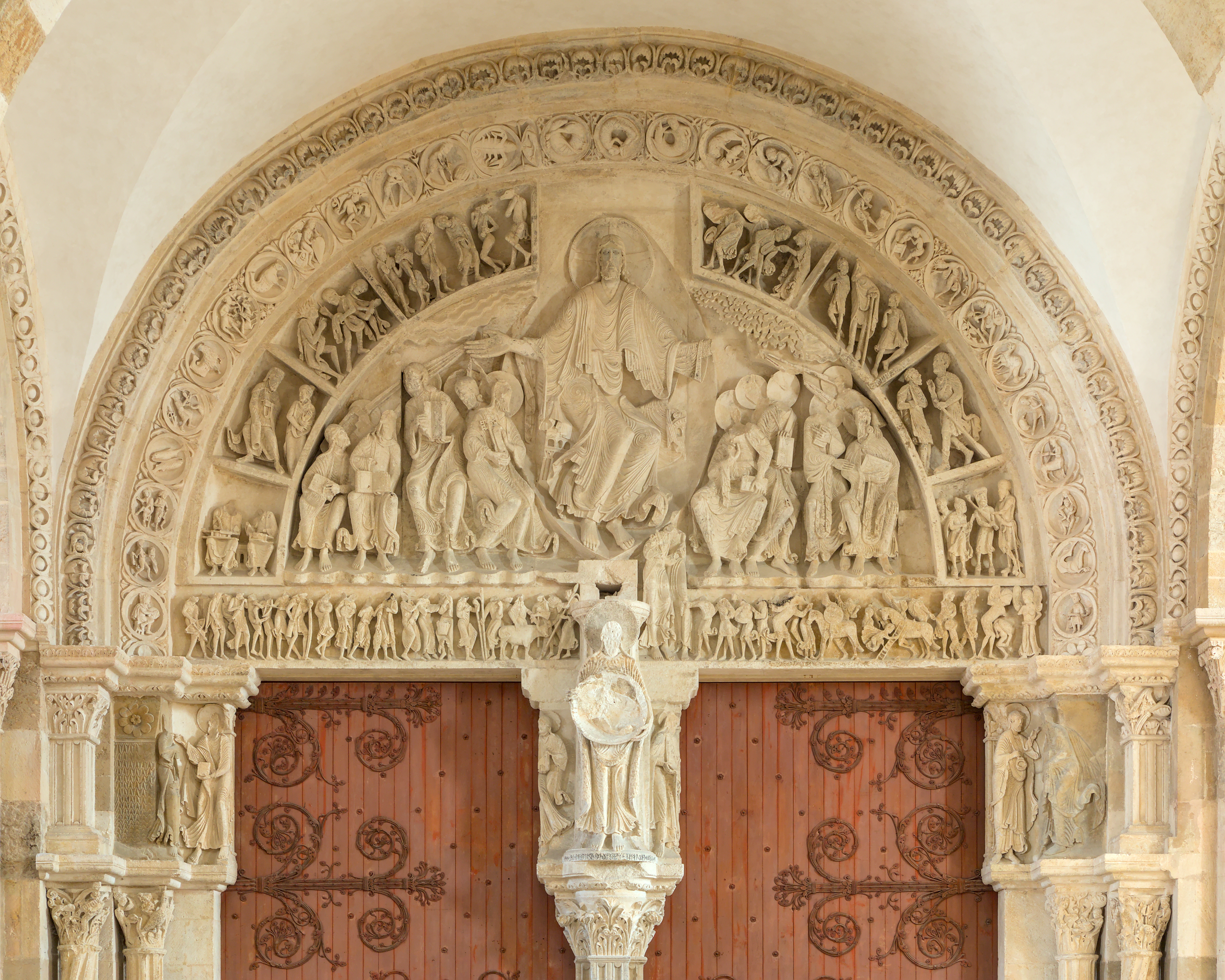
The tympanum of the central portal of the basilica

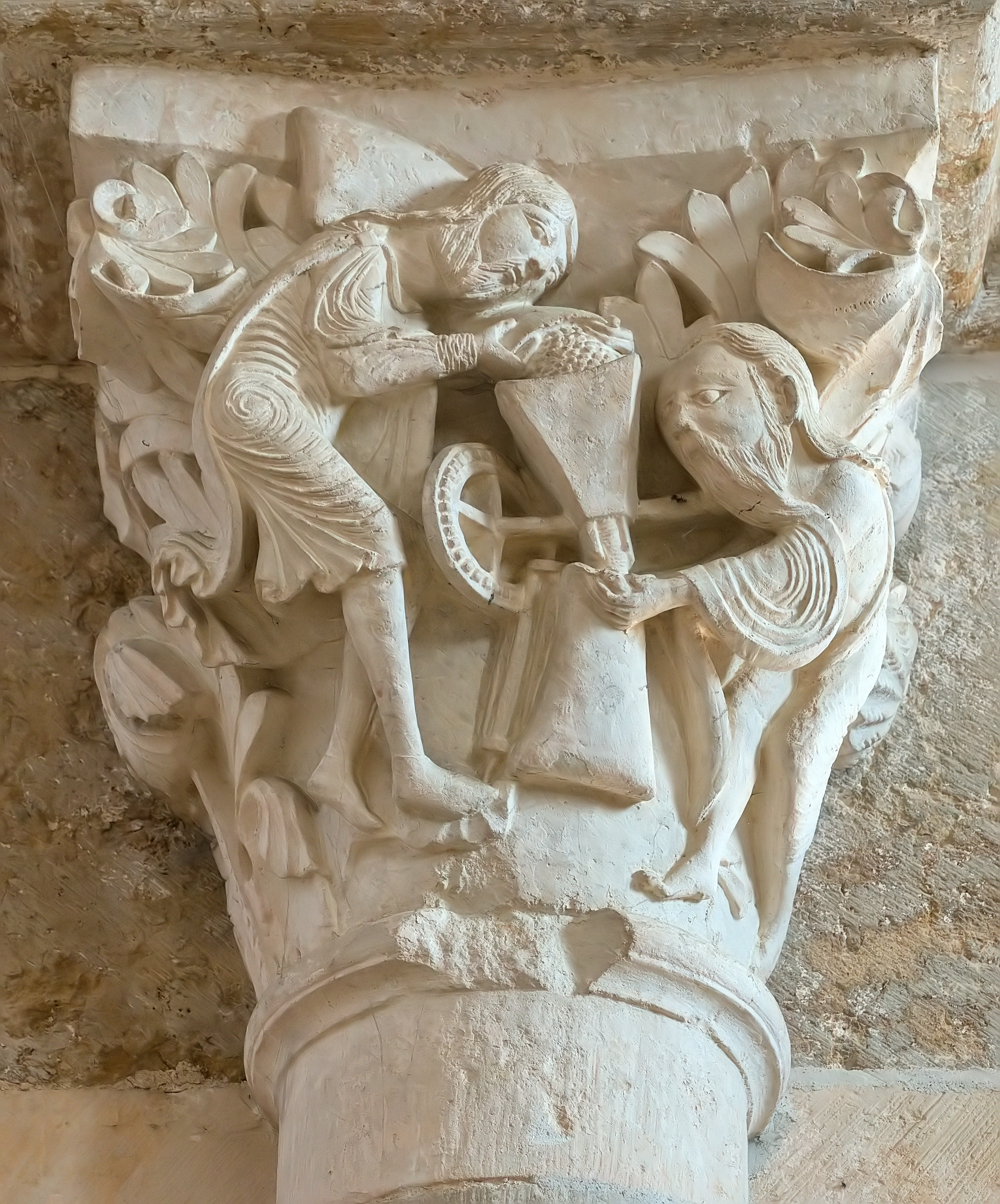
One of the most remarkable capitals of the basilica : the Mystical Mill, with Moses of the left and saint Paul on the right

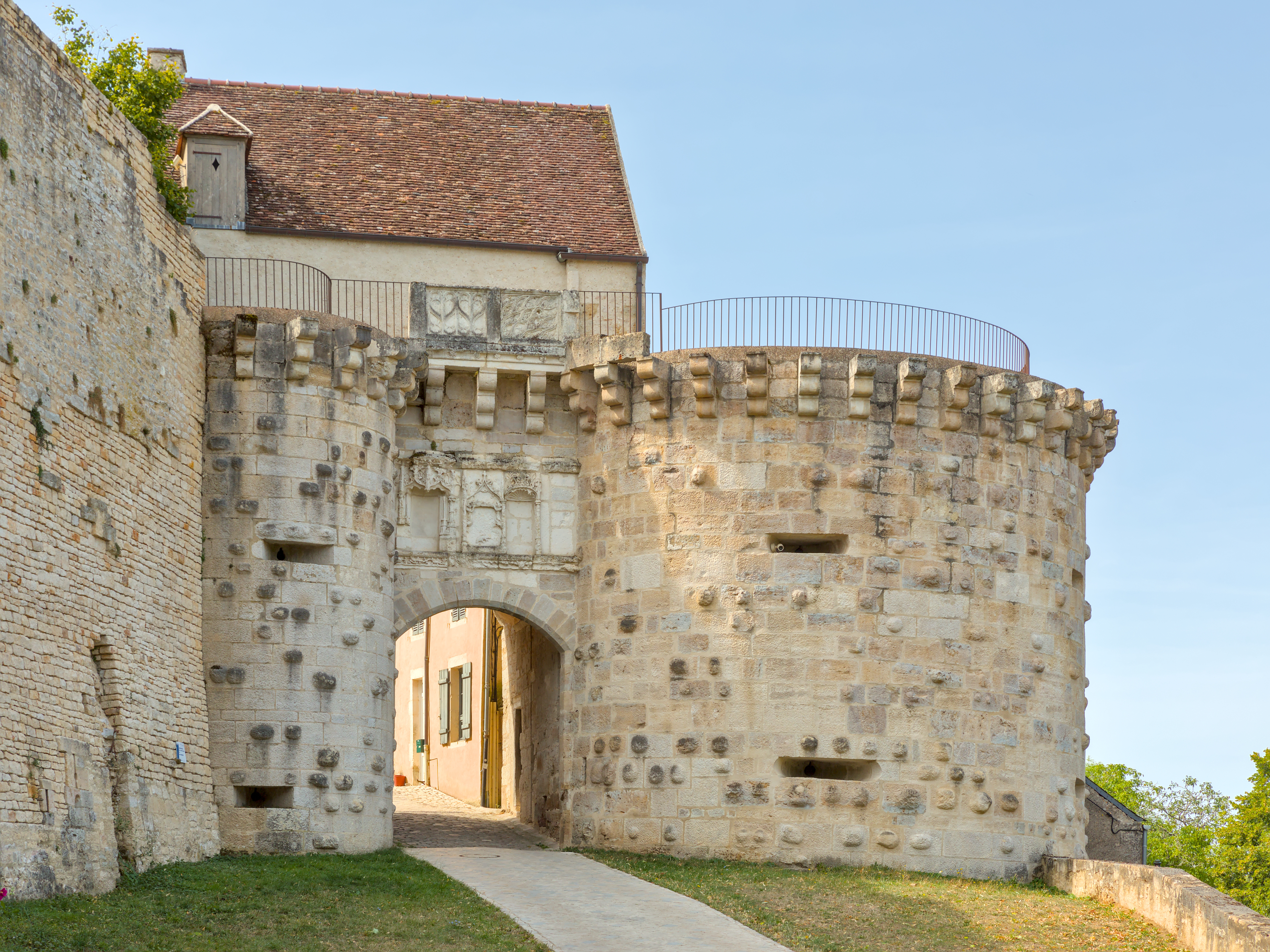
Porte Neuve, a gate in the city walls

== See also ==
- Communes of the Yonne department
- Morvan Regional Natural Park
