= Eustace of Flanders =

Flemish nobleman

Eustace of Flanders or Eustace of Hainaut was a member of the House of Flanders, brother of the Latin Emperors Baldwin I and Henry, and regent of the Kingdom of Thessalonica in 1209–1216.

== Life ==
Eustace was a younger son of Count Baldwin V of Hainaut and Countess Margaret I of Flanders. His older brothers Baldwin I (r. 1204–1205) and Henry (r. 1205–16) participated in the Fourth Crusade and were the first two emperors of the Latin Empire of Constantinople.

Eustace himself probably did not participate in the Crusade, and only appears among the senior noblemen of the Latin Empire in 1206. He was evidently among those nobles from Flanders and northern France who were invited to come to the Latin Empire by his brothers. In 1208 he was sent to command a garrison in the Rhodope Mountains, belonging to the autonomous prince Alexius Slav. In summer 1209, Henry quelled a revolt of the Lombard barons of the Kingdom of Thessalonica, and brought the realm under his effective control by appointing Eustace (along with Berthold of Katzenelnbogen) as his de facto viceroy there. The Greek ruler of Epirus, Michael I Komnenos Doukas, sent envoys to propose an alliance. Henry distrusted Michael's sincerity, but sent an embassy to Epirus with his terms, which amounted to Michael declaring himself a vassal of the Latin Empire. As confirmation of the pact, Eustace married a daughter of Michael and received a third of his lands as her dowry.

Eustace is last mentioned in April 1217 as attending the coronation of the new Latin emperor, Peter of Courtenay, and his sister, Yolanda of Flanders. Eustace probably accompanied Peter on his overland march into Epirus, was taken captive alongside him by Theodore Komnenos Doukas, and perished in captivity.

== Sources ==
- Bredenkamp, François (1996). The Byzantine Empire of Thessaloniki (1224–1242). Thessaloniki: Thessaloniki History Center. ISBN 9608433177.
- Longnon, Jean (1978). Les compagnons de Villehardouin: Recherches sur les croisés de la quatrième croisade. Geneva: Librairie Droz.
- Van Tricht, Filip (2011). The Latin Renovatio of Byzantium: The Empire of Constantinople (1204-1228). Leiden: Brill. ISBN 978-90-04-20323-5.
