= Philip II of Namur =

Marquis of Namur (1194–1226)

Philip II (1194–1226), called à la lèvre, was the Marquis of Namur from 1216 to his death. He was the eldest son of Peter II of Courtenay and Yolanda of Flanders. On the death of his maternal uncle Philip the Noble in 1212, his mother Yolanda temporarily ruled Namur and passed the county to Philip in 1216.

== Heir to the Latin Empire of Constantinople ==
His father Peter was chosen as Latin Emperor of Constantinople in 1216 and was captured and imprisoned in 1217. His mother Yolanda died in 1219. Philip refused to rule the empire when it was offered to him. The Constantinople empire went to his brother Robert.

== War of succession in Namur ==
Philip had to fight the descendants of Henry IV of Luxembourg (as Henry I of Namur) who had not given up their claim to Namur. He fought Waleran III of Limburg, husband of Ermesinda of Luxembourg, and concluded peace in March 1223 at Dinant.

== Albigensian Crusade ==
In 1226, he partook in the Albigensian Crusade of Louis VIII of France and the siege of Avignon. Philip died near Saint-Flour in the Auvergne. He was unmarried and the margraviate went to his brother Henry.

== Sources ==
- Previte-Orton, C.W. (1960). The Shorter Cambridge Medieval History. Vol. II: The Twelfth Century to the Renaissance. Cambridge at the University Press.
- Van Tricht, Filip (2011). The Latin Renovatio of Byzantium: The Empire of Constantinople (1204-1228). Brill.294

Preceded by Yolanda	Margrave of Namur; 1216–1226	Succeeded by Henry II
