= Van Aalst =

Aalst is Dutch surname. Notable people with the surname include:

- Diederik van Aalst, the last lord/count of the Land of Aalst
- J. A. van Aalst (1858–1914), Belgian customs and postal officer in China
- Roy van Aalst (born 1983), Dutch politician
- Wil van der Aalst (born 1966), Dutch computer scientist

== See also ==
- Van Aelst, Dutch and Flemish surname
