= Baldwin V =

Baldwin V may refer to:

- Baldwin V of Flanders (1012–1067)
- Baldwin V of Hainaut (1150–1195)
- Baldwin V of Jerusalem, king of Jerusalem from 1183 to 1186
