= Baldwin IV =

Baldwin IV may refer to:

- Baldwin IV of Jerusalem (1161–1185), king of Jerusalem from 1174 until 1185
- Baldwin IV of Flanders (980–1035), count of Flanders from 987 to 1035
- Baldwin IV of Hainaut (1108–1171), count of Hainaut from 1120 to 1171
- Wade Baldwin IV (born 1996), American professional basketball player
