= Aalst =

Aalst may refer to:

== Places ==
- Aalst, Belgium, a city and municipality in Belgium
  - Okapi Aalst, Belgian professional basketball club based in Aalst
- Aalst, Buren, a village in the Netherlands, in the province of Gelderland
- Aalst, North Brabant, a village in the Netherlands, in the province of North-Brabant
- Aalst, Zaltbommel, a village in the Netherlands, in the province of Gelderland

== Other uses ==
- Aalst (play), by Pol Heyvaert

== See also ==
- Van Aalst, Dutch surname
