= Alice of Namur =

Lotharingian noblewoman (died 1169)

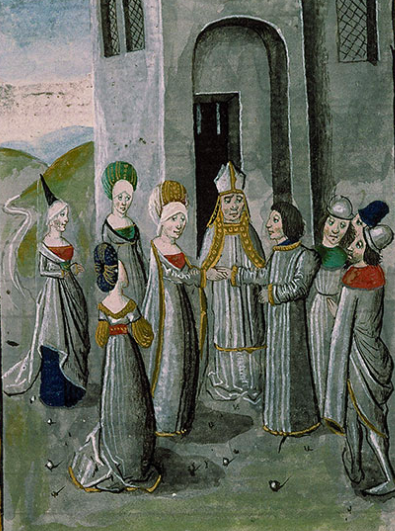
- Died: July 1169; Valenciennes
- Noble family: House of Namur
- Spouse: Baldwin IV of Hainaut
- Issue: Yoldande; Baldwin; Geoffrey; Lauretta; Baldwin V, Count of Hainaut
- Father: Godfrey I of Namur
- Mother: Ermesinde of Luxembourg

Alice of Namur (died July 1169 at Valenciennes) was the daughter of Count Godfrey I of Namur and Countess Ermesinde of Luxembourg.

Her father married her off to Count Baldwin IV of Hainaut around 1130. Gislebert of Mons described her as having "a graceful body and a beautiful face". Their son Baldwin was the heir of Namur when her brother Count Henry IV of Luxembourg died in 1196.

Her children with Baldwin IV of Hainaut were:

- Yolande (1131/5 – after 1202), wife of Count Ives II of Soissons, and Count Hugh IV of Saint Pol
- Baldwin (1134 – 1147/50)
- Agnes (1140/45 – 1174 or after), married Ralph de Coucy
- Geoffrey, Count of Oostrevant (1147–1163), first husband of Countess Eleanor of Vermandois
- Lauretta (died 1181), wife of Thierry of Alost (Dirk van Aalst) and Bouchard V of Montmorency
- Baldwin V, Count of Hainaut (1150–1195), later Count of Flanders by marriage to Margaret I of Flanders
- Henry (died after 1207), Seigneur of Sebourg
- Bertha

She was buried inside Saint Waltrude Collegiate Church.

== Bibliography ==
- L. Devillers, Memoire historique et descriptif sur l'eglise de Sainte-Waudru a Mons, Mons, 1857.
- J.A. Everard, Brittany and the Angevins: Province and Empire, Cambridge, 2000, pp. 30-31.
- F. Rousseau, Henri l’Aveugle, Comte de Namur et de Luxembourg (1136-1196), Liège, 2013 (= Paris - Liège, 1921).
