= Ingeborg Psalter =

12th-century illuminated psalter

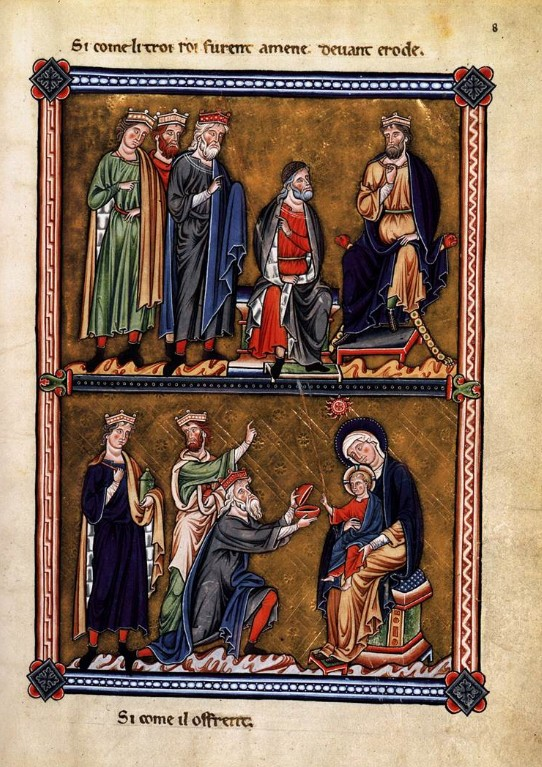
Magi & Herod, Ingeborg Psalter

The Ingeborg Psalter is a late 12th century illuminated psalter now housed in the Musée Condé of Chantilly, France.

It was created about 1195 in northern France for Ingeborg of Denmark, wife of King Philip II of France. It is unknown who commissioned the Psalter for Ingeborg, but it may have been commissioned by either Stephen of Tournai or Eleanor, Countess of Vermandois. It is one of the most significant surviving examples of early Gothic painting.

The manuscript was prayerbook for private devotionals and contains a calendar, the 150 Psalms in Latin plus other liturgical texts. There are 200 extent folios. The text is written in an early Gothic minuscule.
