= Van Aelst =

Van Aelst is a Dutch and Flemish surname. Notable people with the surname include:

- Evert van Aelst (1602–1657), Dutch painter
- Kees van Aelst (1916–2000), Dutch water polo player
- Nicolaus van Aelst (c.1526–1613), Flemish engraver
- Pieter Coecke van Aelst (1502–1550), Flemish painter
- Peeter van Aelst, 17th-century Dutch painter listed by Cornelis de Bie in his Het Gulden Cabinet
- Pieter van Aelst (f 1644–1654), Flemish painter
- Pieter van Aelst III (c. 1495 – c. 1560), Flemish tapestry weaver
- Willem van Aelst (1627–c.1683), Dutch painter

== See also ==
- Van Aalst, Dutch surname
