= Tsarevets (fortress) =

Medieval stronghold in Veliko Tarnovo, Bulgaria

Coordinates: 43°5′0″N 25°39′10″E

- Bulgaria
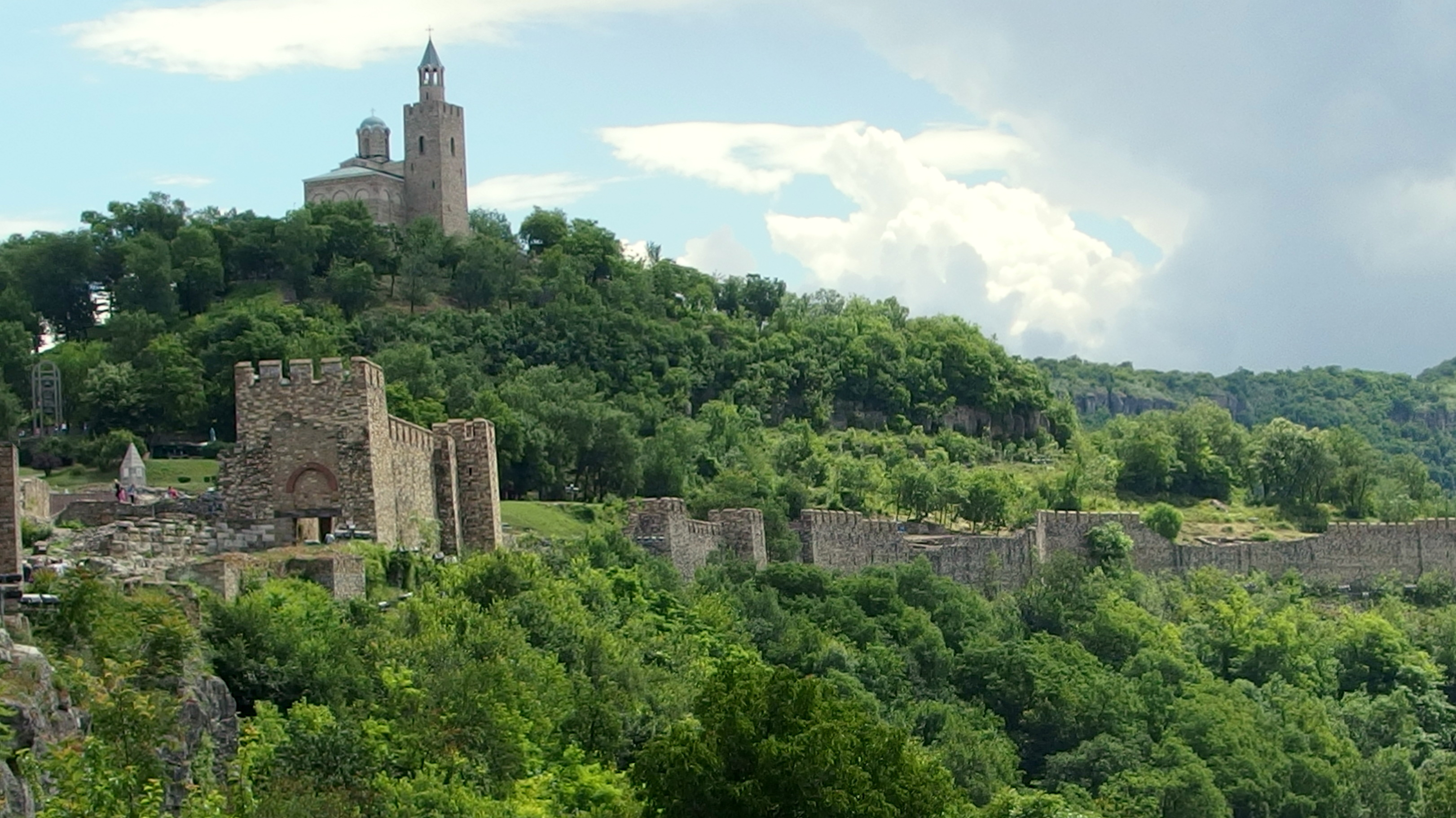

Location

Tsarevets (Bulgarian: Царевец, romanized: Carevec, pronounced [ˈt͡sarɛvɛt͡s]) is a medieval stronghold located on a hill with the same name in Veliko Tarnovo in northern Bulgaria. Tsarevets is 206 metres (676 ft) above sea level. It served as the Second Bulgarian Empire's primary fortress and strongest bulwark between 1185 and 1393, housing the royal and the patriarchal palaces, and it is also a popular tourist attraction.

== History ==
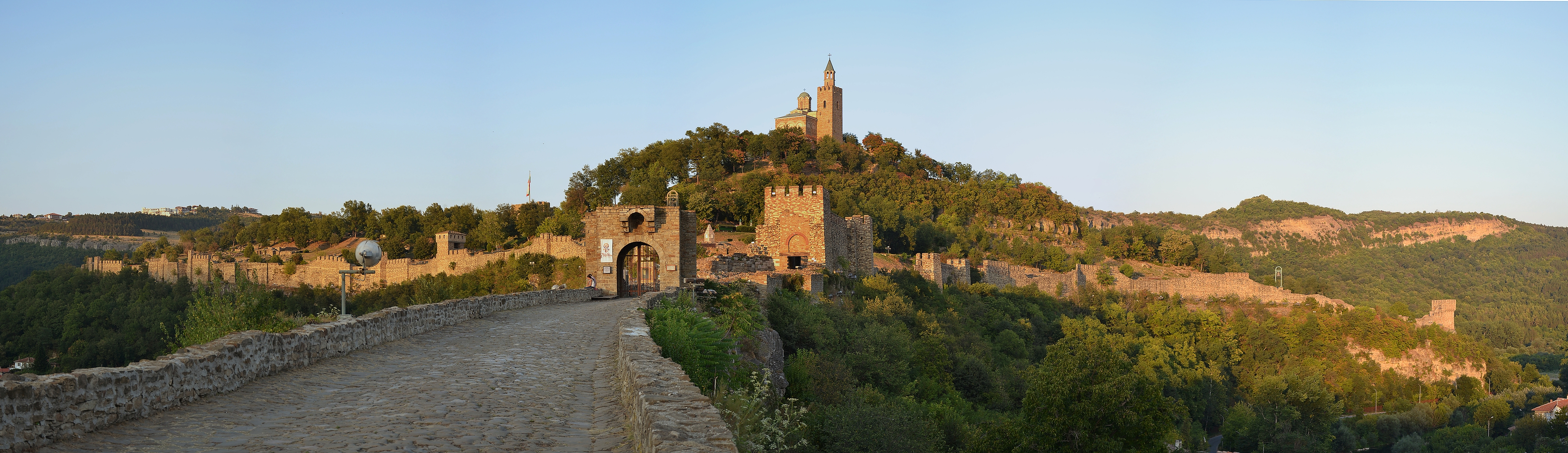
Veliko Tarnovo - Tsarevets

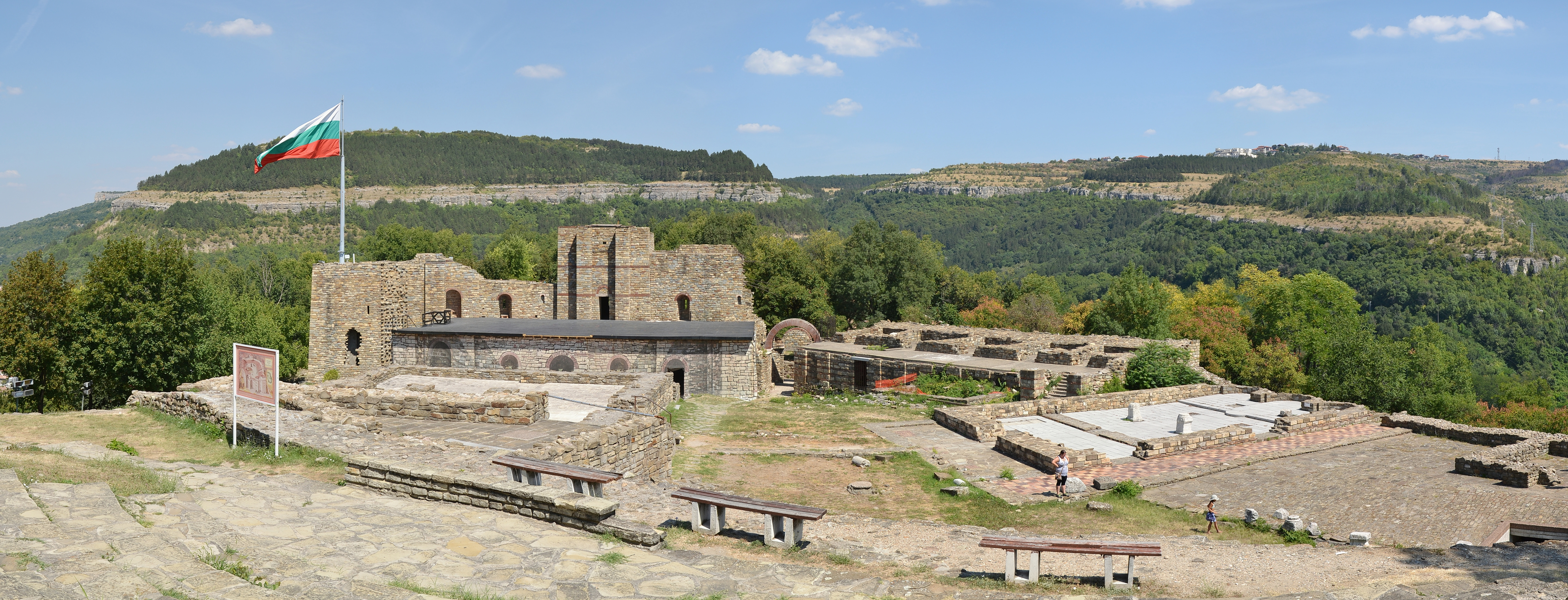
Ruins of the Palace

The earliest evidence of human presence on the hill dates from the 2nd millennium BC. It was settled in the 4th century, and a Byzantine city, tentatively identified with Zikideva, was constructed near the end of the 5th century, on the grounds of which the construction of the Bulgarian stronghold was begun in the 12th century. After the Bulgarian Rebellion and the establishment of the Second Bulgarian Empire with its capital in Veliko Tarnovo, the fortress became the most important one in Bulgaria, often compared with Rome and Constantinople in magnificence. In 1393, the stronghold was besieged by Ottoman forces for three months before finally being conquered and burnt down on 17 July, which marked the fall of the Bulgarian Empire.

It has three entrances. The main entrance is located on the easternmost side of the hill. The castle complex is located in the centre, surrounded by an internal stone wall, two battle towers and two entrances - north and south. It consists of a throne hall, a castle church and the king's chamber. The restoration of the fortress Tsarevets began in 1930 and was completed in 1981 in honour of the 1300 anniversary of the establishment of the Bulgarian state. Kings Petar, Asen, Kaloyan and Ivan Asen the second lived there. The castle was the biggest one in the 14th century.

== Complex ==
The whole stronghold is girdled by thick walls reaching up to 3.6 metres (12 ft) and was served by three gates. The main gate was at the hill's westernmost part, on a narrow rock massif, and featured a draw-bridge. The second gate is 180 metres (590 ft) away from the first one and the third one, which existed until 1889, is 450 metres (1,480 ft) further.

The palace is on the hill's central and plain part, which was a closed complex encircled by a fortified wall, two towers and two entrances, a main one from the north and one from the south. It featured a throne room, a palace church and a royal residential part and encompassed 4,872 square metres (52,440 ft^{2}).

On the top of the hill is the patriarchate, a complex with an area of about 3,000 square metres (32,000 ft^{2}). The Cathedral of the Ascension of the Lord, built on the remains of a late Roman basilica, was reconstructed in 1981 and painted in 1985. The frescoes inside, painted in a striking modernist style rather than in the style of traditional Orthodox frescoes, depict conventional Christian subjects as well as glorious and tragic moments of the Second Bulgarian Empire. The church has not been reconsecrated.

Baldwin's Tower (Балдуинова кула), a modern reconstruction of a medieval tower modeled after the tower in Cherven and built in 1930, is in the southeastern part of the fortress. It is at the place of the original medieval tower where Latin Emperor Baldwin I of Constantinople found his death as a prisoner of Kaloyan of Bulgaria.

During the Middle Ages, residential buildings, craftsman's workshops and numerous churches and monasteries were situated on the slopes of the Tsarevets hill. Archaeologists have discovered 400 residential buildings, differentiated in quarters, over 22 churches and 4 monasteries.

Tsarevets hill is also the location of Execution Rock, an outcropping over the Yantra River from which traitors were pushed to their deaths and their bodies fell into the river. There Patriarch Joachim was executed by the Tsar Theodore Svetoslav in the year 1300.

== Audiovisual show ==
The Sound and Light (Звук и светлина, Zvuk i svetlina) audiovisual show is an attraction carried out in the evening that uses three lasers, variegated lights, dramatic music and church bells to tell the story of the fall of Tarnovo to the Ottomans, as well as other key moments of the history of Bulgaria. The large-scale show has been organized at Tsarevets since 1985, when the 800-year anniversary of the Uprising of Asen and Peter was celebrated. It was designed and planned by a Bulgarian-Czechoslovak team led by Valo Radev and Jaromir Hnik.

Changing of the Guard. A 15-minute ceremonial procession begun 15 April 2011 at 19:30, to be performed each weekend throughout the summer (tourist season).

== Honours ==
Tsarevets Buttress on Trinity Peninsula, Antarctica is named after the site.

== Gallery ==
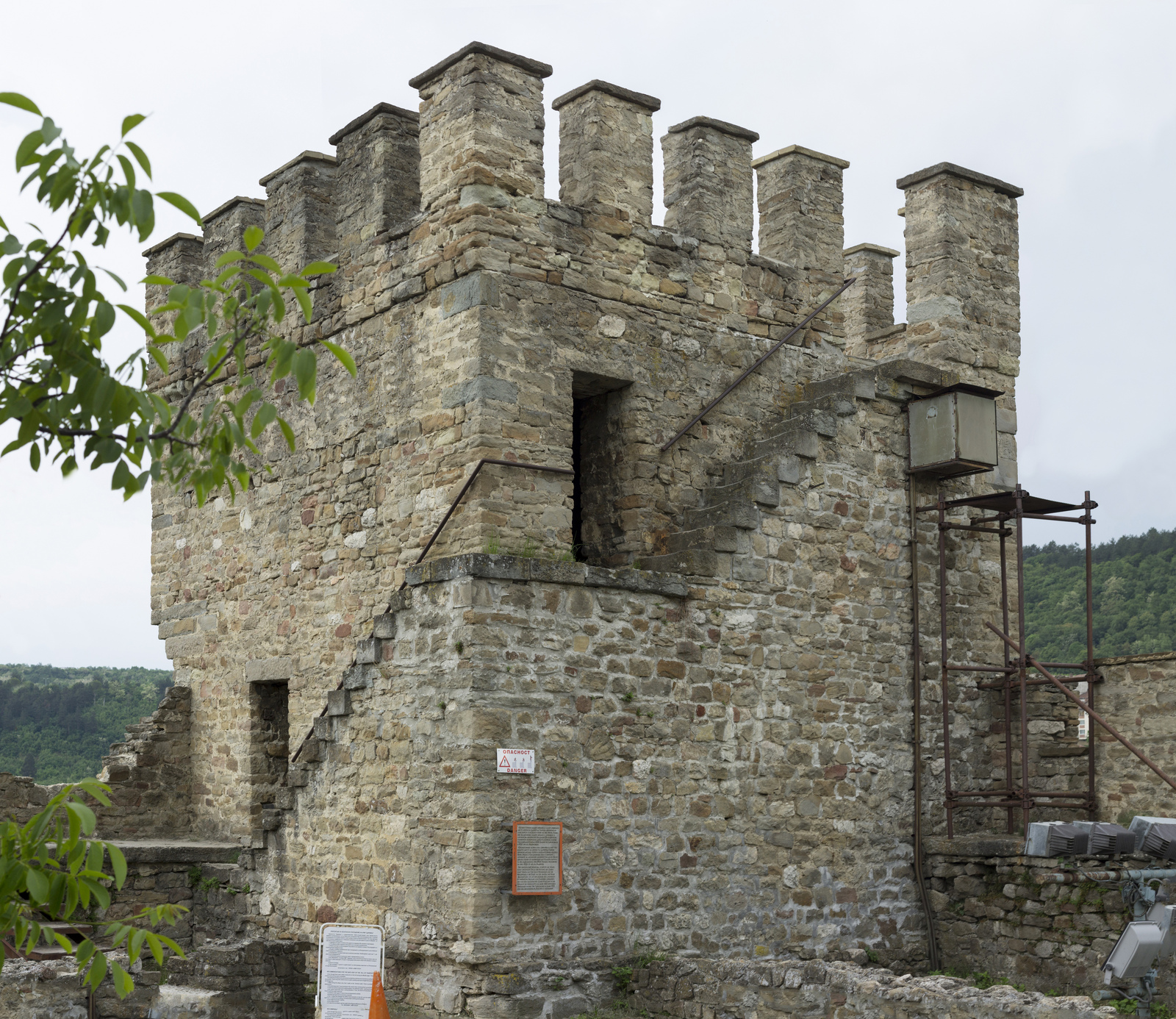
Baldwin's Tower

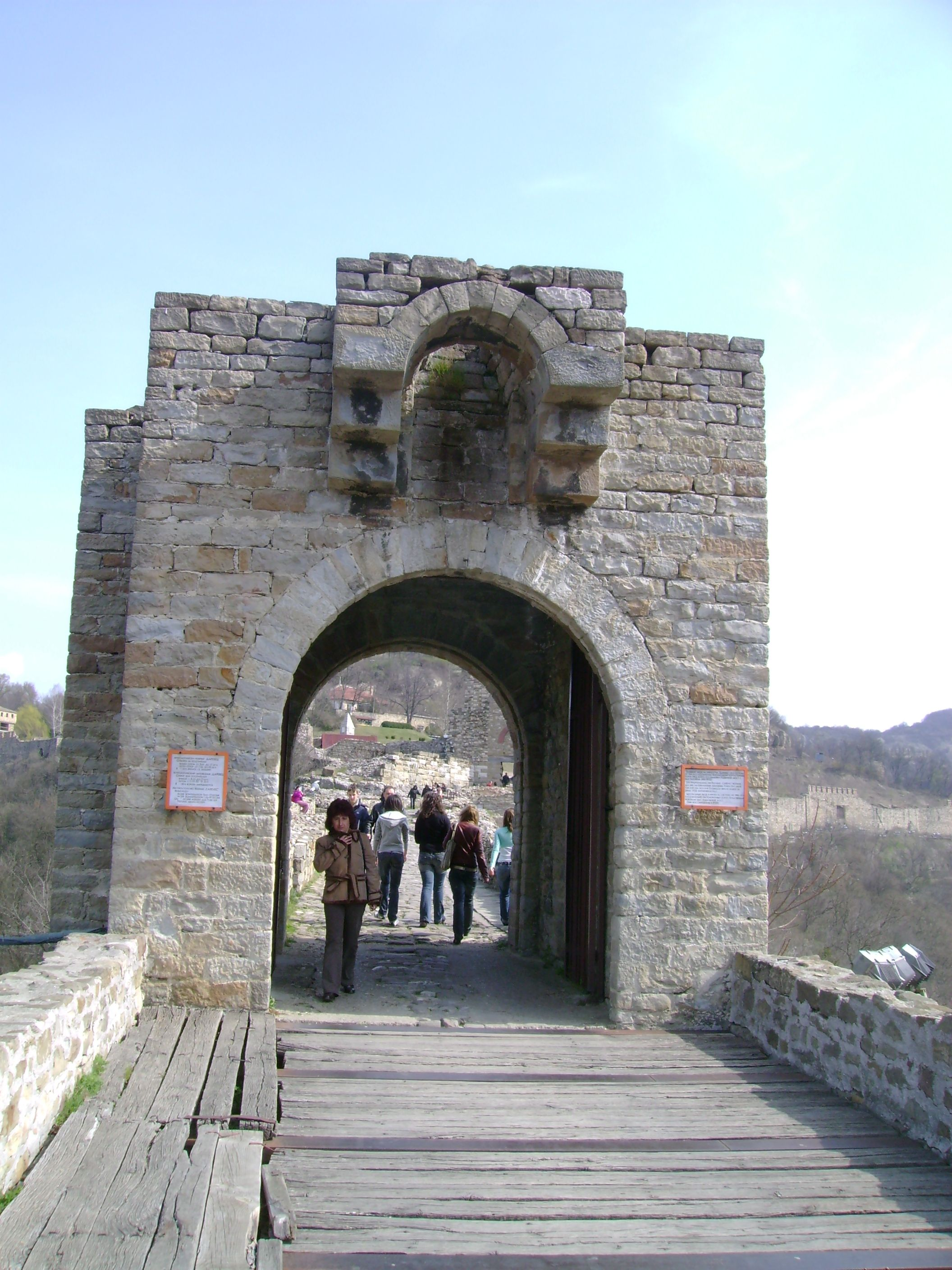
Gate

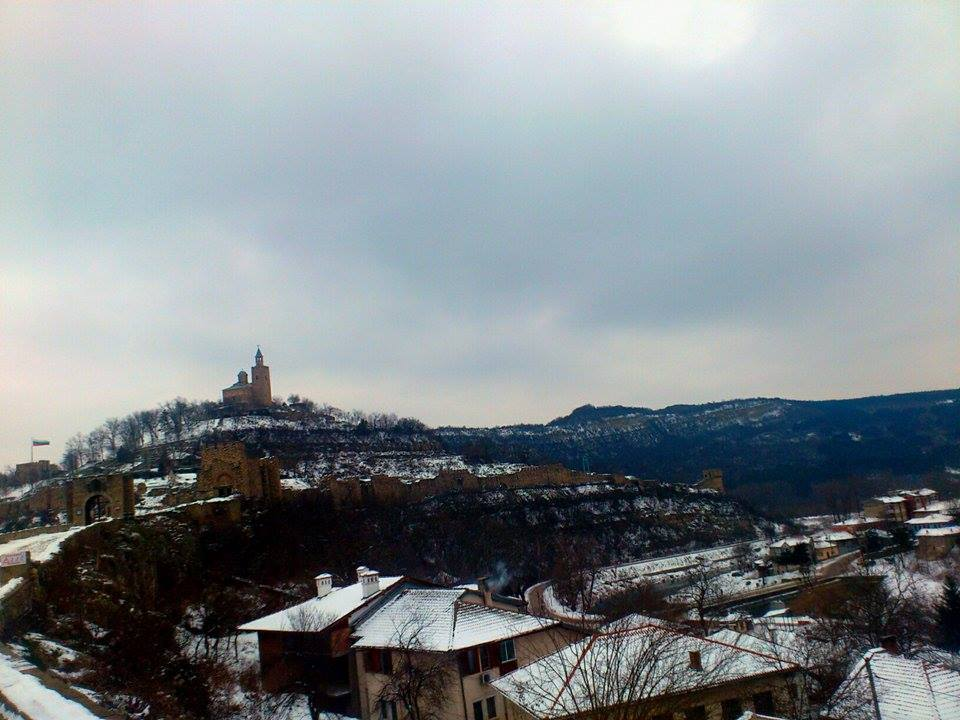
Winter view of Tsarevets (31.12.2014)

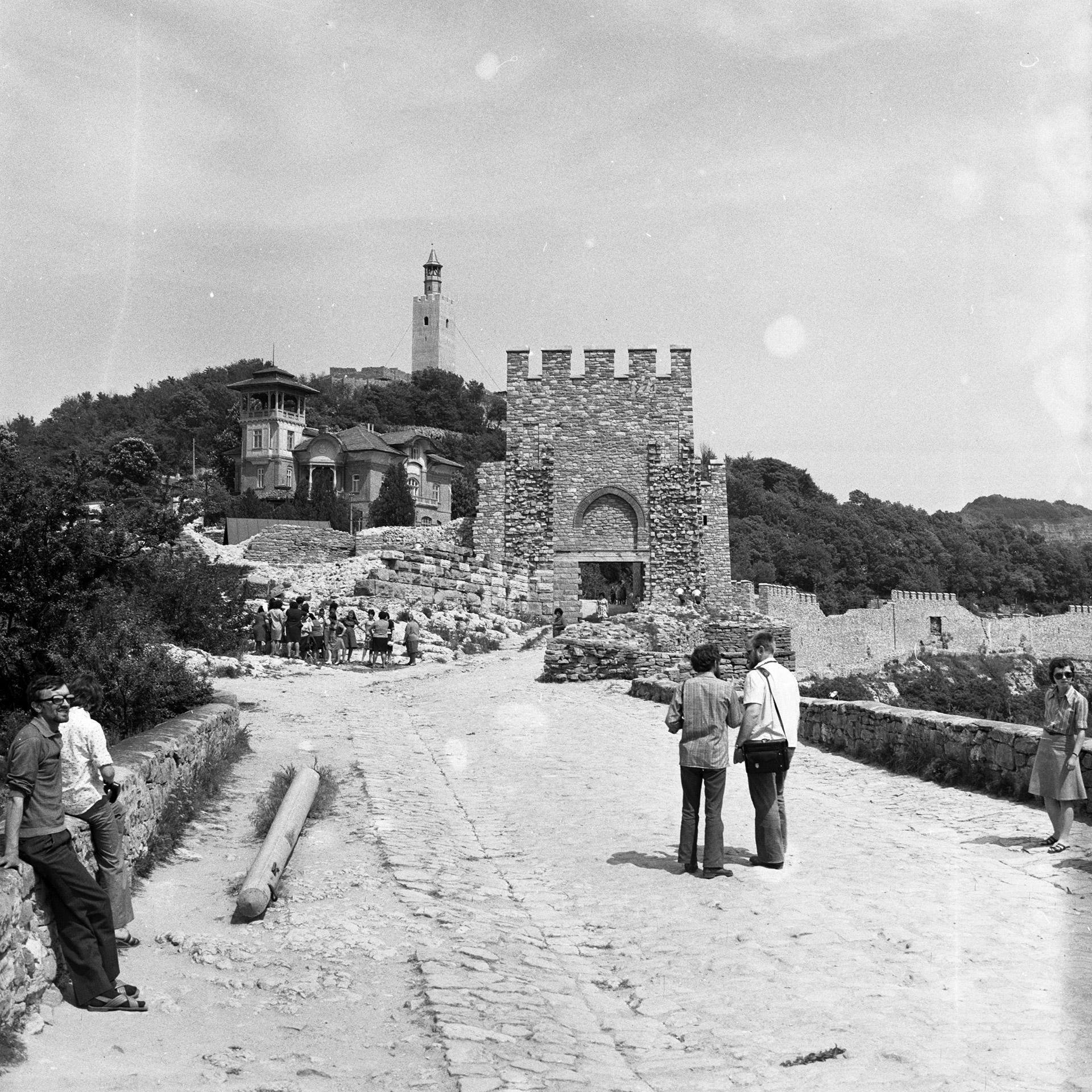

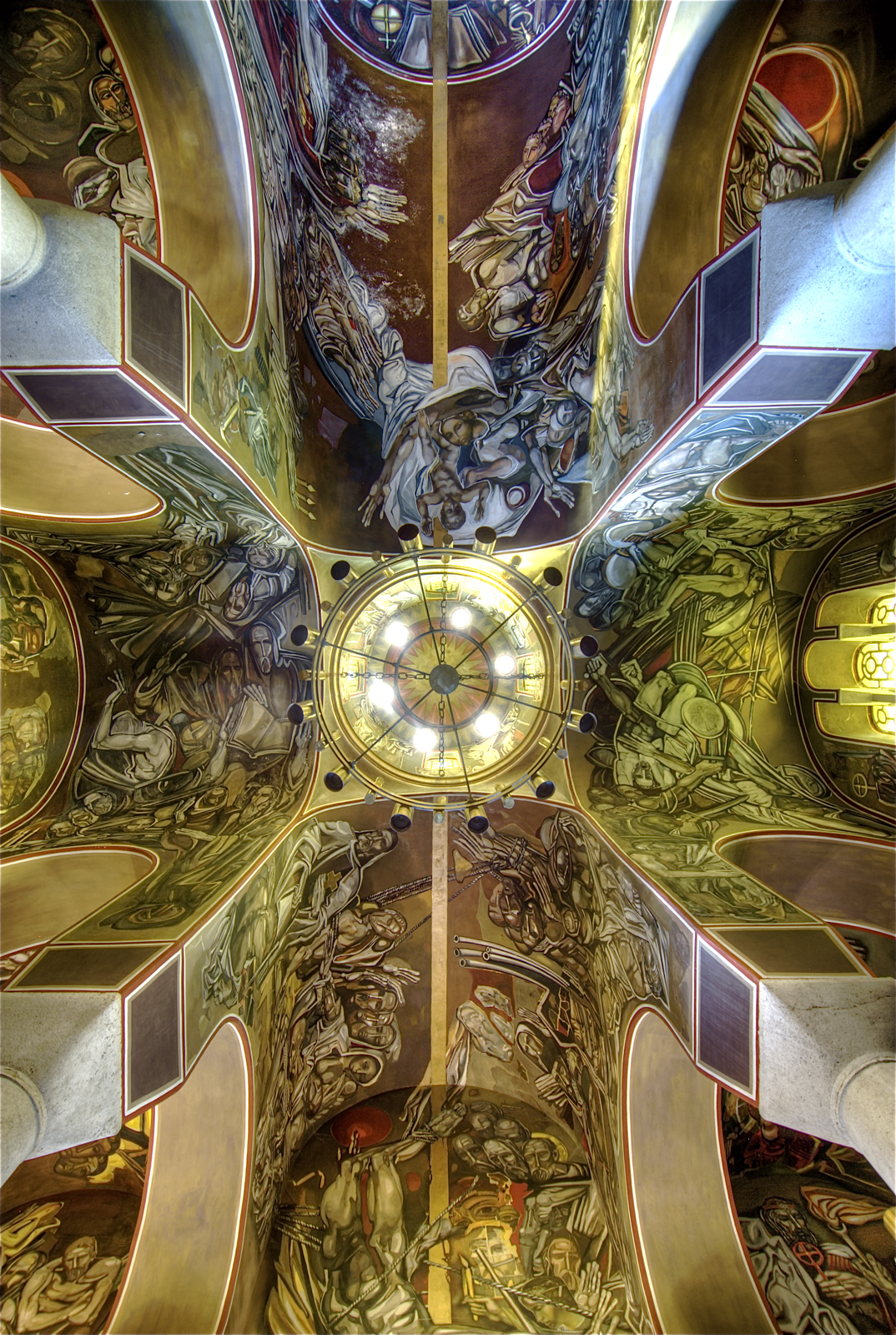

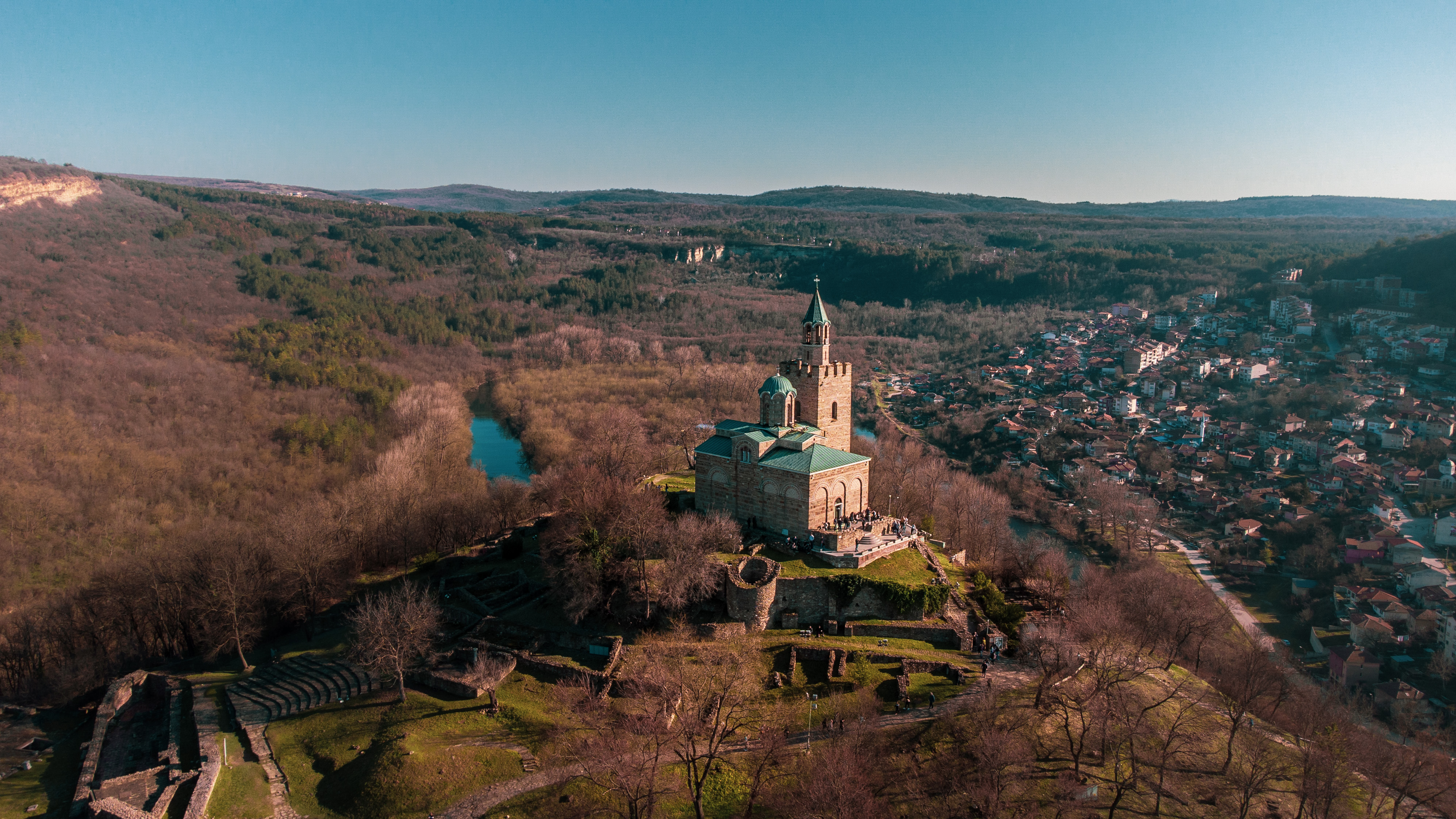
Aerial view towards the Patriarch church, restored in 1981 (03.03.2021)
