= Philip I of Namur =

Margrave of Namur (1175–1212)

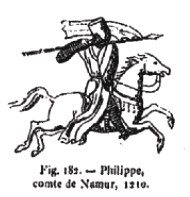
Philip as depicted on his seal

Philip I (1175 – 9 October 1212), called the Noble, was the margrave of Namur from 1195 until his death. He was the second son of Count Baldwin V of Hainault and Countess Margaret I of Flanders. His paternal grandmother was Alice of Namur.

== Reign ==
Baldwin V had fought a war with his uncle Count Henry IV of Luxembourg to establish Namur as independent from Luxembourg in 1189 and in 1194, Emperor Henry VI declared Namur to be a margraviate. Baldwin's will left Namur to Philip, but as a fief of Hainault.

Count Theobald I of Bar, who had married Henry of Luxembourg's daughter, Ermesinda, refused to relinquish Namur and attacked Philip, besieging him in Namur. The war lasted for three years until the Treaty of Dinant, signed on 26 July 1199, recognised Philip as holder of Namur.

Philip was left as regent of Hainault while his elder brother, Count Baldwin IX of Flanders, went on the Fourth Crusade and acted as guardian to Baldwin's daughters, Joanna and Margaret.

Following Baldwin's capture at Adrianople, Philip was summoned to a meeting by King Philip Augustus of France at Pont de l'Arche. Philip was forced to swear fealty to the king of France and give Baldwin's daughters as wards of the King. Along with these exactions Philip was forced to marry Marie, daughter of Philip Augustus and Agnes of Merania.

In Namur, Philip reigned as a peaceful and pious promoter of social development. He intervened as the mediator between many feuding lords. He died of dysentery on 9 October 1212, in Valenciennes. He had designated his twin sister Yolande as heir.

== Notes ==
Preceded by Baldwin I	Margrave of Namur; 1195–1212	Succeeded by Yolanda
