= Baldwin's Tower =

Tower house in Bulgaria

Coordinates: 43°4′51″N 25°39′11″E

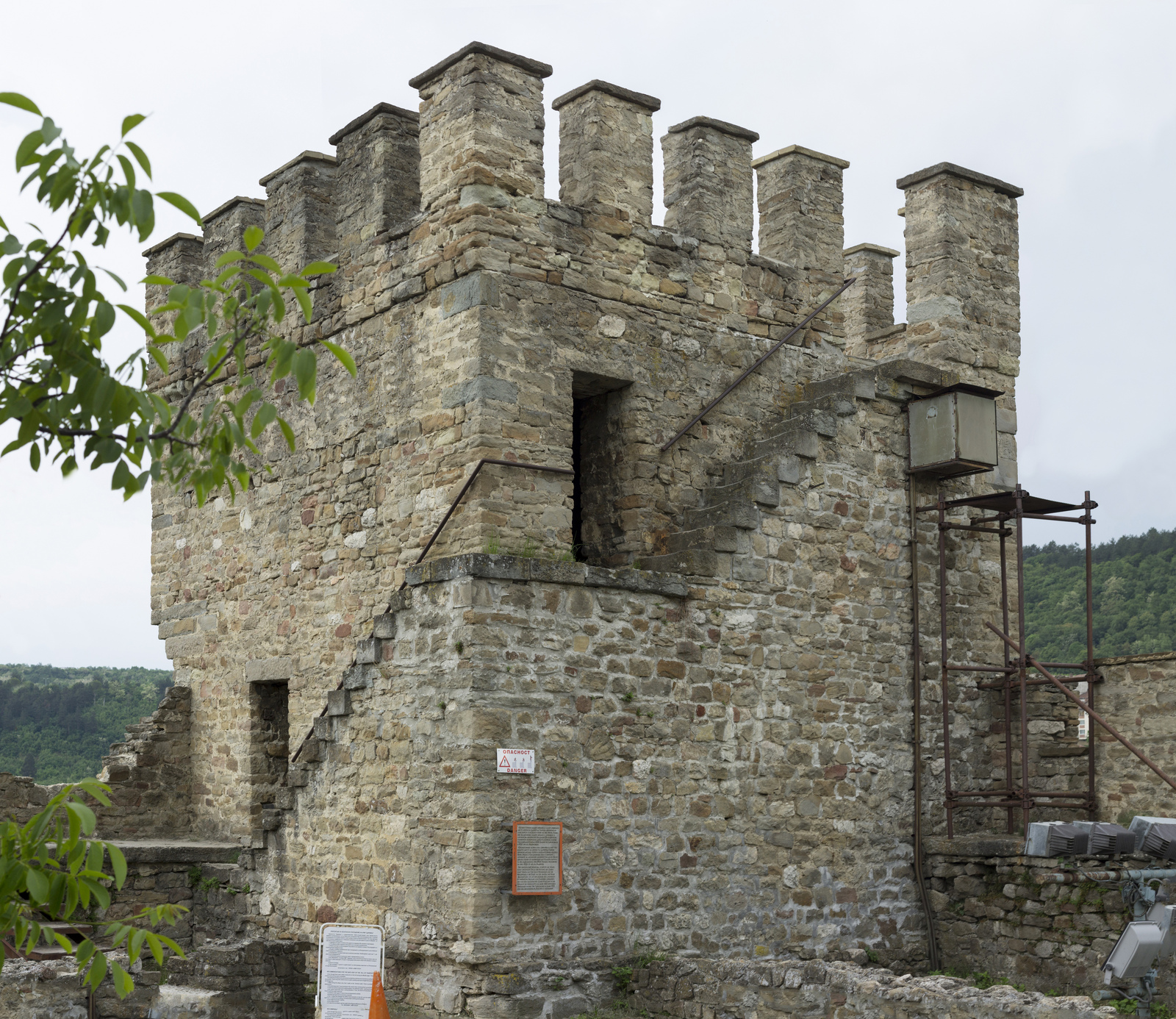
Baldwin's Tower

Baldwin's Tower (Bulgarian: Балдуинова кула, Balduinova kula) is a tower house located in the Tsarevets fortress in the Bulgarian town of Veliko Tarnovo. The tower's name originates from Baldwin IX of Flanders, who was imprisoned in the tower after his capture in the Battle of Adrianople. It overlooks the Frankish Quarter (Frenkhisar) and Frenkishar Gate which are located southeast of the fortress wall of the Tsarevets fortress. The Sofia Globe regarded it as one of Bulgaria's biggest historical tourism spots.

== History ==
The tower's name originates from Baldwin IX of Flanders, one of the leaders of the Fourth Crusade which sacked Constantinople and first emperor of the Latin Empire after their conquest of the Byzantine Empire. In 1205, Baldwin led a Crusader force against Bulgarian emperor Kaloyan and was captured after the Battle of Adrianople. It is commonly said that Baldwin was imprisoned in, and eventually died in, the tower. (Note: Some sources report his death as fact. George Bradshaw hedged his death with "probably", while the Sofia Globe regarded it as legend.) The tower survived until 1913 when it was destroyed by an earthquake. It was restored in either 1930, 1933, or 1938 by archaeologist and architect Alexander Rashenov based on the preserved medieval tower in the Cherven fortress near Rousse.

On February 29, 2013, the Bulgarian National Television reported that Baldwin's Tower was in critical need of repair, alongside concerns it may be too dangerous for visitors. The reason for the damage was that tourists would pick stones out of the tower’s walls and floors, either as mementos or to throw them from the cliff into the nearby Yantra River. The cost of repairs was estimated to be 15,000 leva, which was expected to come from entrance fees paid by tourists visiting Tsarevets.
