= Yolanda of Flanders =

Latin Empress from 1217 to 1219

Yolanda

Latin Empress of Constantinople
- Reign: 1217–1219
- Coronation: 9 April 1217
- Predecessor: Henry of Flanders
- Successor: Robert of Courtenay
- Co-ruler: Peter II of Courtenay (1217)
- Born: 1175
- Died: 1219 (aged 43–44)
- Spouse: Peter II of Courtenay
- Issue more...: Philip II, Marquis of Namur; Margaret, Marchioness of Namur; Elizabeth, Empress of Bulgaria; Yolanda, Queen of Hungary; Robert I, Latin Emperor; Agnes, Princess of Acaia; Marie, Empress of Nicaea; Henry II, Marquis of Namur; Baldwin II, Latin Emperor
- House: Flanders
- Father: Baldwin V of Hainault
- Mother: Margaret I of Flanders

Yolanda of Flanders (French: Yolande de Hainault; 1175 – September 1219) was the ruling empress of the Latin Empire in Constantinople from 1217 to 1219. Her husband, Peter II of Courtenay, was captured and imprisoned before he could reach Constantinople, so Yolanda ruled Constantinople alone. She was the margravine of Namur from 1212 until 1216.

== Biography ==
Yolanda was the daughter of Baldwin V, Count of Hainault, and Countess Margaret I of Flanders. Two of her brothers, Baldwin I and then Henry, were emperors in Constantinople.

In 1212, Yolanda inherited the title of Margrave of Namur from her brother, Philip I, and held the title jointly with her husband Peter.

After the death of her brother, emperor Henry, in 1216, there was a brief period without an emperor, before Peter was elected to succeed her brother.

Her husband Peter accepted the imperial crown at her instigation. Yolanda, who was empress in her own right, was crowned by Pope Honorius III together with her husband Peter.

On their way there, Peter sent Yolanda ahead to Constantinople, while he fought the Despotate of Epirus, during which he was captured. Because his fate was unknown (although he was probably killed), Yolanda ruled Constantinople alone for two years.

Benjamin Hendrickx described her as a regent, but Filip Van Tricht consider her as an empress in her own right, because:

- For the legitimacy of his emperorship, her husband was dependent on her as the sister of the previous emperors.
- In April 1217 in Rome, she, together with her husband, confirmed the constitutional conventions of the empire in the presence of the envoys of the Venetian doge, something that is unknown of any other empress.
- From a 13th-century Venetian catalogue of emperors, she ruled the empire whilst Conon of Béthune governed it at her side, this ensuing from a woman being on the imperial throne.

She allied with the Bulgarians against the various Byzantine successor states, and was able to make peace with Theodore I Lascaris of the Empire of Nicaea, who married her daughter, Marie.

She died in September 1219.

== Legacy ==
Following Yolanda's death, her second son, Robert of Courtenay, became emperor because her eldest son, Philip, did not want the throne. Robert was still in France at the time.

Yolanda left the title of Margrave of Namur to her eldest son, Marquis Philip II, when she went to Constantinople in 1216.

== Issue ==
By Peter of Courtenay she had 13 children:

- Philip II (1194–1226), Marquis of Namur, who declined the offer of the crown of the Latin Empire
- Margaret (1196–1258), Marchioness of Namur, who married first Raoul d'Issoudun and then Henry count of Vianden
- Elizabeth (1199–1269), who married Walter (Gaucher) count of Bar and then Eudes sire of Montagu
- Yolanda (1200–1233), who married Andrew II of Hungary
- Robert I (1201–1228), Latin Emperor
- Agnes (1202–1247), who married Geoffrey II Villehardouin, Prince of Achaea
- Constance (died after 1210)
- Marie (1204–1228), who married Theodore I Lascaris of the Empire of Nicaea
- Eleonore (1208–1230), who married Philip of Montfort, Lord of Tyre
- Sybil, nun at Fontevraud-l'Abbaye; died at a young age after 1223
- Peter, clergyman; died at a young age
- Henry (1212–1229), Marquis of Namur
- Baldwin II (1217–1273), Latin Emperor

== Sources ==
- Nicol, Donald M. (14 October 1993) [1972]. The Last Centuries of Byzantium, 1261–1453 (second ed.). Cambridge University Press. ISBN 978-0-521-43991-6.
- Rasmussen, Ann Marie (1997). Mothers and Daughters in Medieval German Literature. Syracuse University Press. ISBN 978-0-8156-0389-4.
- Tricht, Filip Van (23 May 2011). The Latin Renovatio of Byzantium: The Empire of Constantinople (1204–1228). BRILL. ISBN 978-90-04-20323-5.

Yolanda of Flanders House of Hainaut Cadet branch of the House of Flanders Born: 1175 Died: 1219
Regnal titles
| Preceded by Philip I | Marchioness of Namur; 1212–1216 with Peter | Succeeded by Philip II |
| Preceded by Henry | Latin Empress of Constantinople; 1217–1219 with Peter (1217) | Vacant Title next held by Robert |
