= Elisabeth of Courtenay =

Empress consort of Bulgaria
- Tenure: 1213 - 1218
- Born: c. 1199
- Died: 1269 (aged 69–70)
- Spouse: Boril of Bulgaria; Milo IV, lord of Le Puiset; Eudes I Lord of Montaigu
- Issue: Alexandre of Montagu; Guillaume I, Lord of Montaigu; Phillipe of Montagu, Lord of Chagny; Gaucher of Montagu, Lord of Jambles; Eudes of Montagu; Marguerite, Lady of Villeneuve
- House: Courtenay
- Father: Peter II of Courtenay
- Mother: Yolanda of Flanders

Elisabeth of Courtenay (French: Elisabeth de Courtenay; c. 1199 –1269) was an Empress consort of Bulgaria, the daughter of Peter II of Courtenay and Yolanda of Flanders.

Elisabeth married tsar Boril of Bulgaria (died 1218), Walter of Bar-sur-Seine (died 1219) and then Eudes I Lord of Montaigu. Elisabeth and Eudes had:

- Alexandre of Montagu, (1221–1249)
- Guillaume I, Lord of Montaigu, (1222–1300)
- Phillipe of Montagu, Lord of Chagny (born 1227) married Flore d'Antigny. Had a daughter Jeanne of Montagu.
- Gaucher of Montagu, Lord of Jambles, (born 1230)
- Eudes of Montagu, (born 1231)
- Unnamed daughter, (died young)
- Unnamed daughter, (died young)
- Marguerite, Lady of Villeneuve, (born 1232)
