= Ascension Cathedral, Veliko Tarnovo =

Eastern Orthodox cathedral in Bulgaria

Patriarchal Cathedral of the Holy Ascension of the Lord
- Патриаршеска катедрала "Свето Възнесение Господне", Patriarsheska katedrala "Sveto Vaznesenie Gospodne"
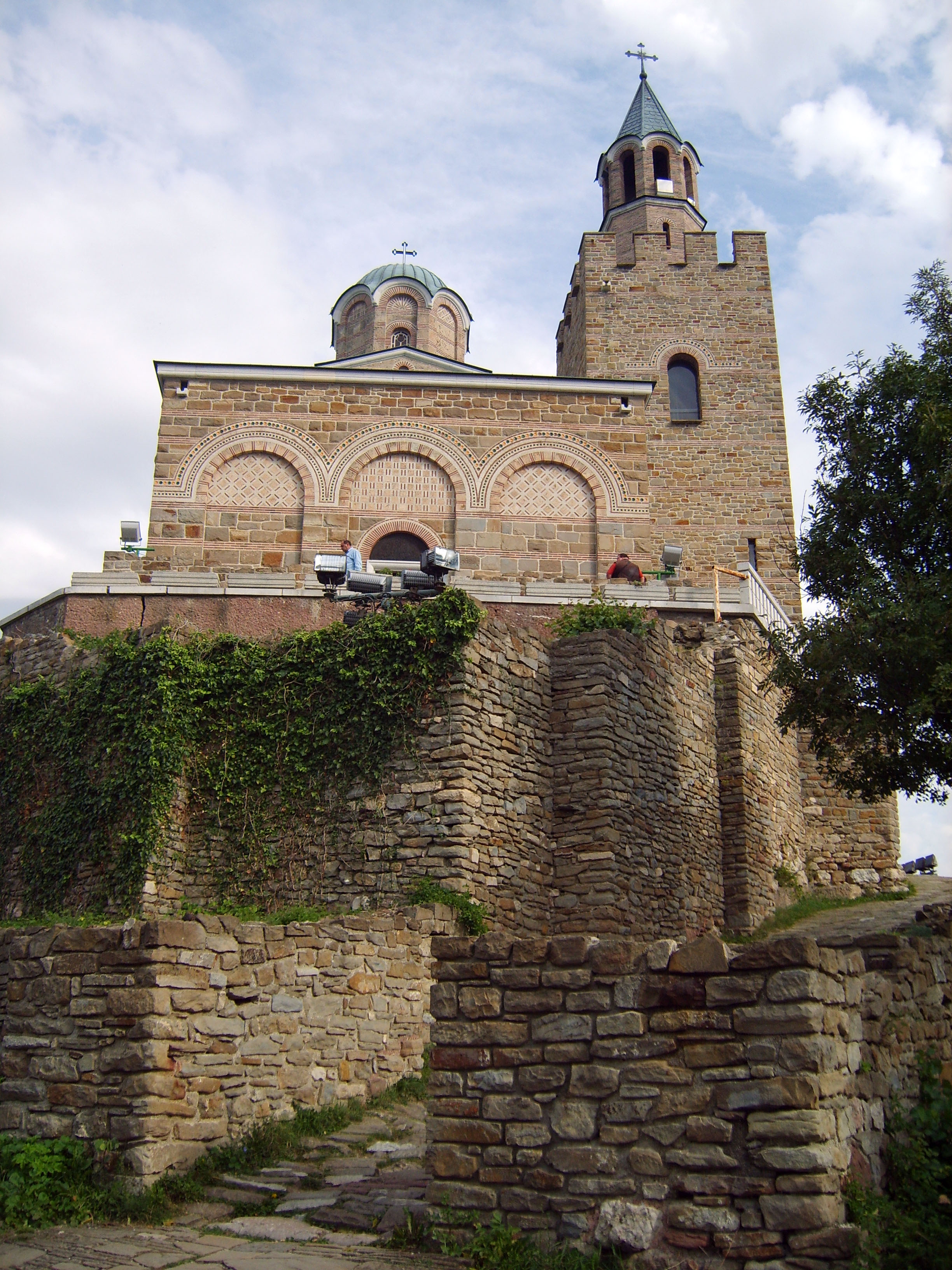
- The Patriarchal Cathedral of the Holy Ascension of the Lord, topping the Tsarevets hill in Veliko Tarnovo
- Patriarchal Cathedral of the Holy Ascension of the Lord
- 43°4′58″N 25°39′8.3″E
- Country: Bulgaria
- Denomination: Eastern Orthodox

The Patriarchal Cathedral of the Holy Ascension of the Lord (Bulgarian: Патриаршеска катедрала "Свето Възнесение Господне", Patriarsheska katedrala "Sveto Vaznesenie Gospodne") is a former Eastern Orthodox cathedral in the city of Veliko Tarnovo, in north central Bulgaria. Located on top of the fortified Tsarevets hill in the former capital of the Second Bulgarian Empire, the cathedral was the seat of the Bulgarian patriarch from its construction in the 11th–12th century to its destruction in 1393.

Standing on top of a late Roman church, the cathedral, reconstructed in the 1970s and 1980s, follows a cross-domed plan with a bell tower and a triple apse. Richly decorated on both the exterior and interior, its internal walls now feature modern frescoes, the presence of which has meant that it has not been reconsecrated. Though not active as a Christian place of worship, it has been open for visitors since 1985.

== History ==
The Patriarchal Cathedral of the Holy Ascension of the Lord is not the first church building to occupy the position on the top of Tsarevets hill. It was constructed directly on top of a late Roman (early Byzantine) basilica which dates to the 5th–6th century AD. The Roman basilica may have remained in use by the local congregation during the First Bulgarian Empire, though it was no longer active by the time the construction of the current church began.

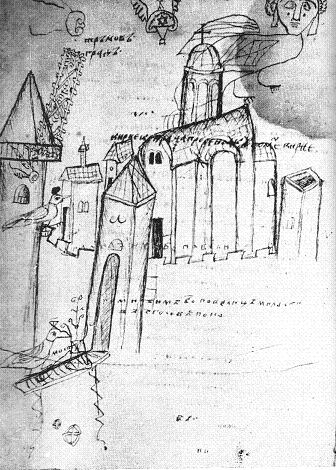
The Patriarchal Cathedral as illustrated in a sketch in the 14th-century Braşov Menaion

The current building of the Patriarchal Cathedral is considered by scholars to have been built in two stages. The first stage of construction was carried out in the late 11th century or the 12th century. The cathedral was initially built as a monastery church in the middle of a monastery compound, though in the early 12th century it was already the seat of the Bulgarian patriarch. The compound suffered large-scale damage caused by a fire, which necessitated the church's reconstruction in the middle of the 14th century, perhaps during the rule of Tsar Ivan Alexander of Bulgaria (r. 1331–71). Besides repair and reinforcement efforts, work on the church in the 14th century also included the construction of the exonarthex and the bell tower.

There are several references to the cathedral in medieval sources. The earliest reference to the church tells of the transfer of Saint Michael the Warrior's relics from the Potuka fortress to the Patriarchal Cathedral on the order of Tsar Kaloyan (r. 1197–1207). The housing of a warrior saint's relics in the Patriarchal Cathedral signifies the incessant warfare against Byzantines and Latins that dominated Kaloyan's reign. In the late 14th century, the last Patriarch of Tarnovo, Saint Evtimiy, described the church as the "great patriarch's Cathedral of the Holy Ascension" in his writings.

Another possible reference to the church may be in a marginal note from 1358 to a copy of the Acts of the Apostles. In the note, the copyist, one Laloe, thanks God and the "Holy and Most Glorious Ascension" for having finished his work on the book. Scholar Bistra Nikolova believes this to be an allusion to the Patriarchal Cathedral, which may have patronised the project. Alternatively, the copy could have been made at the cathedral's scriptorium, where Laloe may have worked.

The church is also depicted in the medieval sketch of Tarnovo in the Braşov Menaion, a menaion service book written in the mid-14th century and then carried to Kronstadt (now Braşov, Romania) after the fall of Bulgaria under Ottoman rule.

The Patriarchal Cathedral was destroyed after the Ottomans captured the Bulgarian capital after their Siege of Tarnovo on 17 July 1393. The church was fully reconstructed in the 20th century; reconstruction works were carried out by a team under architect Boyan Kuzupov. These commenced in 1978 and were finished in 1981, to mark Bulgaria's 1300th anniversary. However, it was not until November 1985, when the contemporary murals were finished, that the church was opened once again for visitors. The church's ruins have been protected as a national antiquity since 1927; in 1967, they were proclaimed an architectural monument of culture of national importance. As part of the Tsarevets architectural reserve, it is also listed among the 100 Tourist Sites of Bulgaria.

== Location and architecture ==
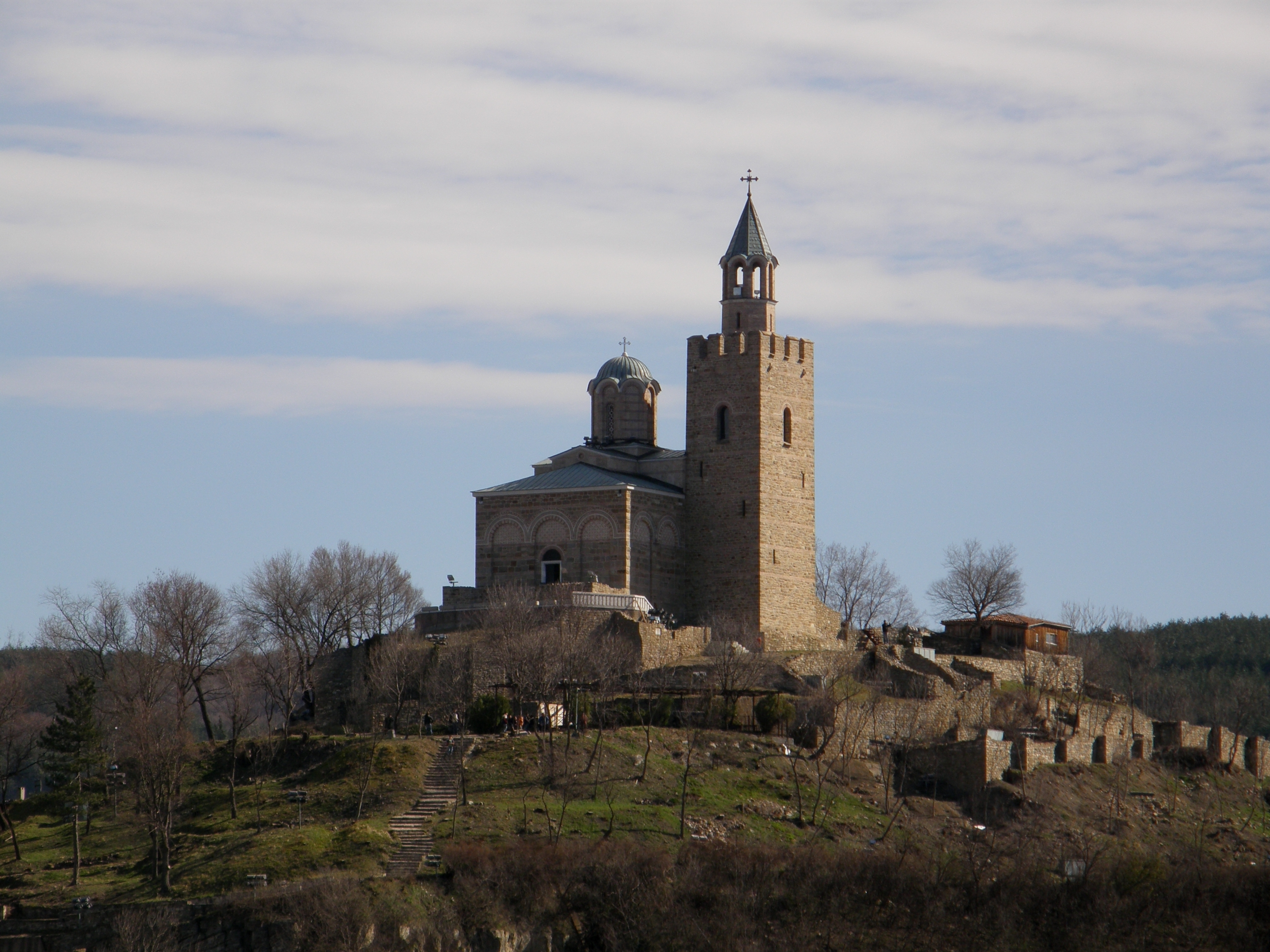
View of the cathedral at a distance

The Patriarchal Cathedral of the Holy Ascension of God is located on top of the Tsarevets hill, overlooking the modern city of Veliko Tarnovo. The church was part of a group of buildings that constituted the seat of the Bulgarian Patriarchate and acted as the city and the country's main cathedral. The patriarchate on Tsarevets was a fortress of its own, with two defensive towers and an entrance on its west wall. The Patriarchal Cathedral stood in the middle of its courtyard.

The Patriarchal Cathedral features a triple apse, the central part of which matches the apse of the original basilica on the site. The three-naved church follows the traditional Byzantine cross-in-square design. Built out of crushed stones and mortar with limited brickwork, it measures 26 by 12 metres (85 ft × 39 ft). The cathedral includes two narthices, a bell tower, and two other premises attached to the south church wall. The presence of a bell tower is considered to be a rarity in Balkan church architecture. Six columns support the interior and distinguish the altar from the cella (naos). It is unclear whether the church housed a synthronon (stone benches for the clergy) in the apse, as there are doubts that its remains may actually be part of the older basilica.

The church featured ample exterior and interior decoration. While the facades were decorated with arches and ceramic tiles, the interior floor mosaics were made of white, yellow, and pink marble as well as semi-precious gemstones like sapphire and porphyry. The interior walls were covered with frescoes and mosaics. However, none of the interior decoration has survived. During the church's 20th-century reconstruction, its interior was repainted by artist Teofan Sokerov, who depicted important moments of medieval Bulgarian history in a modernist style. Due to these murals, the church has never been reconsecrated and remains inactive. The facade of the cathedral also includes a stone with a donor's inscription of a Bulgarian ruler, which ended up as part of the building material.

There are a total of four burial grounds in and around the church, two of which are for priests. One of the burial grounds is inside the exonarthex, where overarched tombs were built in the 14th century. Besides Michael the Warrior's relics, the cathedral also housed the remains of Bulgarian patriarchs Joachim I, Macarius and Joachim III.
