= Henry II of Namur =

Marquis of Namur (1206–1229)

Henry II

Marquis of Namur
- Reign: 1226–1229
- Predecessor: Philip II
- Successor: Margaret
- Born: 1206
- Died: 1229 (aged 22–23)
- House: Courtenay
- Father: Peter II of Courtenay
- Mother: Yolanda, Latin Empress

Henry II (1206–1229) was the margrave of Namur from 1226 until his death.

== Reign ==
He was the third son of the Peter II of Courtenay, Latin Emperor, and Yolanda, countess of Namur. When his eldest brother, Philip II, Marquis of Namur died in 1226 without an heir, his second brother Robert was already Latin Emperor in Constantinople, so Henry became the new Margrave of Namur. At the time of his succession, Henry was in France, under the guardianship of Enguerrand III, Lord of Coucy.

When his brother Robert died in 1228, Henry renounced the title of Latin Emperor, which went to his younger brother Baldwin.

Henry died himself one year later without children, and he was succeeded by his sister Margaret, who was married to Henry, count of Vianden.

Preceded by Philip II	Margrave of Namur; 1226–1229	Succeeded by Margaret
