= Margaret I of Flanders =

Countess of Flanders from 1191 to 1194

Margaret I
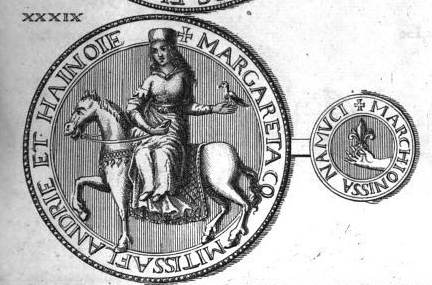
- Margaret's effigy on a seal
- Successor: Baldwin IX
- Born: c. 1145
- Died: 15 November 1194
- Buried: St. Donatian's Cathedral in Bruges
- Noble family: Metz
- Spouses: Ralph II, Count of Vermandois; Baldwin V, Count of Hainaut
- Issue: Isabelle of Hainaut; Baldwin VI of Hainaut; Yolanda of Flanders; Philip I of Namur; Henry of Flanders; Sybille of Hainaut; Eustace of Flanders; Godfrey of Hainaut
- Father: Thierry, Count of Flanders
- Mother: Sibylla of Anjou

Margaret I (c. 1145 – died 15 November 1194) was the countess of Flanders suo jure from 1191 to her death.

== Early life ==
Margaret was the daughter of Count Thierry of Flanders and Sibylla of Anjou.

In 1160 she married Count Ralph II of Vermandois, son of Ralph I and known as Ralph the Younger. Due to his leprosy, the marriage could not be consummated and remained childless. He died of leprosy in 1167 without issue.

In 1169 she married Count Baldwin V of Hainaut, a scion of the House of Flanders.

== Countship ==
In 1191, Margaret's brother Count Philip I of Flanders died childless, as his heir she claimed the county of Flanders with the support of her husband. Her claim was questioned by the king of France who, with support of Ghent, declared Flanders escheated to the crown due to the lack of male heirs, a problem that was not solved until the Treaty of Arras by the mediation of the archbishop of Reims. They met some unrest among the nobility of the area, foremost by her brother's widow, Theresa of Portugal, who was given extensive dower lands in the coastal and southern Flanders where she provoked considerable unrest by high taxation.

The right of Margaret and her husband to the County of Flanders was not finally acknowledged until 1 March 1192. As countess, she objected to all foreign legal independence in her lands, and accordingly, she prevented the Hanse merchants living in Bruges from acquiring a separate quarter and rights for themselves in the port of Damme.

Margaret died on 15 November 1194. As her husband had become Count of Flanders jure uxoris, he could not remain sole count, and Margaret was succeeded by their son Baldwin IX.

== Issue ==
Margaret and Baldwin had:

- Isabella of Hainault, married Philip II of France
- Baldwin IX of Flanders (1171–1205), also count of Flanders and Latin Emperor
- Yolanda (1175–1219), married Peter of Courtenay, Latin Emperor.
- Philip I of Namur (1175–1212), Margrave of Namur, married Marie of France.
- Henry of Flanders (1176–1216), Latin emperor of Constantinople, married firstly to Agnes of Montferrat and secondly to Maria of Bulgaria.
- Sybille (1179–9 January 1217), married c. 1197 Guichard IV, Sire de Beaujeu. They had a daughter, Agnes of Beaujeu.
- Eustace (d. 1219), regent of the Kingdom of Thessalonica
- Godfrey

== Sources ==
- Evergates, Theodore, ed. (1999). Aristocratic Women in Medieval France. University of Pennsylvania Press.
- Nicholas, David (1992). Medieval Flanders. Longman.

Preceded by Philip	Countess of Flanders; 1191–1194 with Baldwin VIII (1191–1194)	Succeeded by Baldwin IX
