= Baldwin V of Hainaut =

Count of Hainaut from 1171 to 1195

Baldwin V, Count of Hainaut
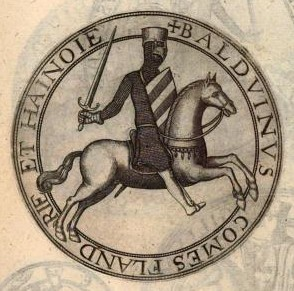
- Baldwin V's seal
- Born: 1150
- Died: 17 December 1195 (age 45)
- Noble family: House of Flanders
- Spouse: Margaret I, Countess of Flanders
- Issue: Isabelle of Hainaut; Baldwin VI of Hainaut; Yolanda of Flanders; Philip I of Namur; Henry of Flanders; Sybille of Hainaut; Eustace of Flanders; Godfrey of Hainaut
- Father: Baldwin IV, Count of Hainaut
- Mother: Alice of Namur

Baldwin V of Hainaut (1150 – 17 December 1195) was count of Hainaut (1171–1195), margrave of Namur as Baldwin I (1189–1195) and count of Flanders as Baldwin VIII (1191–1195).

== History ==
Baldwin was the son of Count Baldwin IV of Hainaut. In the winter of 1182 or 1183, the count of Namur-Luxembourg was seriously ill and completely blind, whereupon Baldwin immediately visited him in Luxembourg. There he was reconfirmed as heir by his uncle and was able to receive the homage of several vassals from him. The succession was confirmed by Emperor Frederick I Barbarossa on 22 May 1184 at the Diet of Pentecost in Mainz, on which Baldwin acted as imperial sword bearer.

Baldwin acquired Flanders with his marriage to his widowed third cousin once removed Margaret I of Flanders in 1169. Namur was acquired from his mother Alice of Namur. He was described as "The Count Baldwin with eyes of blue."

Baldwin was buried at the monastery of Saint Waudru before the altar of Blessed James the apostle.

== Family ==
With Margaret, Baldwin had the following children:

- Isabelle of Hainaut (Valenciennes, April 1170 – 15 March 1190, Paris), married king Philip II of France
- Baldwin VI of Hainaut (1171–1205), also count of Flanders and Latin Emperor
- Yolanda of Flanders (1175–1219), married Peter II of Courtenay, Latin Emperor
- Philip I of Namur (1175–1212)
- Henry of Flanders (1176–1216), Latin Emperor
- Sybille of Hainaut (1179 – 9 January 1217), married c. 1197 Guichard IV, Sire de Beaujeu (d. 1216)
- Eustace of Flanders (d. 1219), regent of the Kingdom of Thessalonica, married in 1209 to a daughter, name unknown, of Michael I Komnenos Doukas, ruler of Epirus
- Godfrey of Hainaut

== See also ==
- Counts of Hainaut family tree
- Counts of Flanders family tree

== Sources ==
- Bouchard, Constance Brittain (1987). Sword, Miter, and Cloister: Nobility and the Church in Burgundy, 980-1198. Cornell University Press.
- Gislebert of Mons (2005). Chronicle of Hainaut. Translated by Napran, Laura. The Boydell Press.
- Nicholas, David M (1992). Medieval Flanders. Routledge.

Preceded by Philip I	Count of Flanders; 1191–1194 with Margaret I	Succeeded by Baldwin VI/IX
Preceded by Baldwin IV	Count of Hainaut; 1171–1195	Succeeded by Baldwin VI/IX
Preceded by Henry I	Marquis of Namur; 1189–1195	Succeeded by Philip I
