= Baldwin I, Latin Emperor =

Latin Emperor from 1204 to 1205

Baldwin I
- Emperor and Autocrat of the Romans
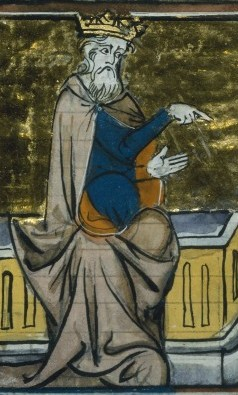

Latin Emperor of Constantinople
- Reign: 1204–1205
- Coronation: 16 May 1204 (Hagia Sophia)
- Predecessor: Alexios V (as byzantine emperor)
- Successor: Henry of Flanders

Count of Flanders
- Reign: 1194–1205
- Predecessor: Margaret I and Baldwin VIII
- Successor: Joan

Count of Hainaut
- Reign: 1195–1205
- Predecessor: Baldwin V
- Successor: Joan

Byzantine emperor (claimant)
- Born: July 1172; Valenciennes, Hainaut, Kingdom of France
- Died: c. 1205 (aged about 32–33); Tarnovo, Bulgaria
- Spouse: Marie of Champagne (m. 1186; died 1204)
- Issue: Joan, Countess of Flanders; Margaret II, Countess of Flanders
- House: House of Flanders
- Father: Baldwin V, Count of Hainaut
- Mother: Margaret I, Countess of Flanders
- Religion: Latin Catholic

Baldwin I (Dutch: Boudewijn; French: Baudouin; July 1172 – c. 1205) was the first Emperor of the Latin Empire of Constantinople; Count of Flanders (as Baldwin IX) from 1194 to 1205 and Count of Hainaut (as Baldwin VI) from 1195 to 1205. Baldwin was one of the most prominent leaders of the Fourth Crusade, which resulted in the sack of Constantinople in 1204, the conquest of the Byzantine Empire, and the foundation of the Latin Empire. The following year he was defeated at the Battle of Adrianople by Kaloyan, the emperor of Bulgaria, and spent his last days as a prisoner.

== Early life and family history ==
Baldwin was the son of Count Baldwin V of Hainaut and Countess Margaret I of Flanders. When the childless Count Philip I of Flanders left on the last of his personal crusades in 1177, he designated Baldwin, his brother-in-law, as his heir. When Philip returned in 1179 after an unsuccessful siege of Harim during a joint campaign on behalf of the Principality of Antioch, he was designated as the chief adviser of Philip Augustus by his sickly father, King Louis VII of France. One year later, Philip of Flanders had his protégé married to his niece, Isabelle of Hainaut, offering the County of Artois and other Flemish territories as dowry, much to the dismay of Baldwin V. In 1180, war broke out between King Philip and his mentor Philip I of Flanders, resulting in the devastation of Picardy and Île-de-France; King Philip refused to give open battle and gained the upper hand, and Baldwin V of Hainaut, at first allied with his brother-in-law Philip I of Flanders, intervened on behalf of his son-in-law, King Philip, in 1184, in support of his daughter's interests.

Count Philip's wife Elisabeth died in 1183, and Philip Augustus seized the province of Vermandois on behalf of Elisabeth's sister, Eleonore. Philip then remarried, to Matilda of Portugal. Philip gave Matilda a dower of a number of major Flemish towns, in an apparent slight to Baldwin V. Fearing that he would be surrounded by the royal domain of France and the County of Hainaut, Count Philip signed a peace treaty with Philip Augustus and Count Baldwin V on 10 March 1186, recognizing the cession of Vermandois to the king, although he was allowed to retain the title Count of Vermandois for the remainder of his life. Philip died without further issue of disease on the Third Crusade at the siege of Acre in 1191, he was succeeded in Flanders by Baldwin V of Hainaut, although the two had been on seemingly uncordial terms since the 1186 treaty. Baldwin V thereupon ruled as Baldwin VIII of Flanders by right of marriage. When Countess Margaret I died in 1194, Flanders descended to her eldest son, Baldwin IX.

In 1186, the younger Baldwin had married Marie, daughter of Count Henry I of Champagne, and Marie of France. The chronicler Gislebert describes Baldwin as being infatuated with his young bride, who nevertheless preferred prayer to the marital bed.

Immediately after this arrangement, the count of Hainaut's son Baldwin, thirteen years old, received as wife Marie, the count of Champagne's sister, twelve years old, at Château-Thierry. This Marie began sufficiently young to devote herself to divine obedience in prayers, vigils, fasts and alms. Her husband Baldwin, a young knight, by chaste living, scorning all other women, began to love her alone with a fervent love, which is rarely found in any man, so that he devoted himself to his sole wife only and was content with her alone. The solemn rejoicing of the wedding was celebrated at Valenciennes with an abundance of knights and ladies and men of whatever status.

19th century portrait of him by Albrecht De Vriendt

Through Marie, Baldwin had additional connections and obligations to the defenders of the Holy Land: her brother Henry II of Champagne had been King of Jerusalem in the 1190s (leaving a widow and two daughters who needed help to keep and regain their territories in Palestine). Marie's uncles Richard I of England and Philip II of France had just been on the Third Crusade.

Baldwin's own family had also been involved in the defence of Jerusalem: his uncle Philip had died on Crusade. Baldwin's maternal grandmother was a great-aunt of Queen Isabella I of Jerusalem and the Counts of Flanders had tried to help Jerusalem relatives in their struggle. Baldwin wanted to continue the tradition. Margaret died in 1194, and the younger Baldwin became Count of Flanders. His father died the next year, and he succeeded to Hainaut.

== Count of Flanders and Hainaut ==
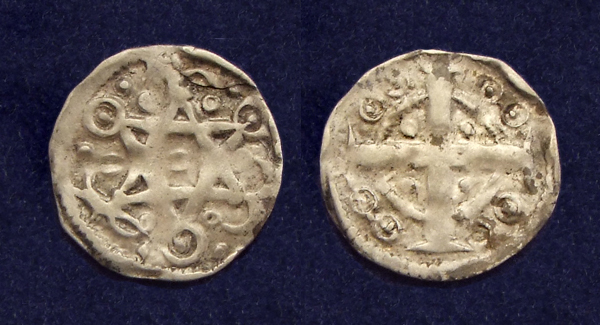
Silver 'maille' (half-denarius or petit denier) struck at Ypres under Baldwin IX

Baldwin took possession of a much-reduced Flanders, lessened by the large chunk, including Artois, given by Philip of Alsace as dowry to Baldwin's sister Isabelle of Hainaut, and another significant piece to his own wife. Isabelle had died in 1190, but King Philip still retained her dowry, on behalf of Isabelle's son, the future Louis VIII of France. The eight years of Baldwin's rule in Flanders were dominated by his attempts to recover some of this land. He formed an anti-French alliance with the Angevins in 1197 and a contingent (including William Marshal) was sent to support the Flemish military operations. Baldwin put the town of Arras under siege and when Philip II of France moved to relieve it, he found himself trapped and suffered a severe defeat, after which a temporary truce was agreed. The truce quickly broke down, and Baldwin launched a full-scale invasion of Artois in 1198, just as the Angevins began an offensive in the Vexin that culminated in a humiliating French defeat at Gisors. Philip II later took Baldwin's brother, Philippe of Namur, prisoner, and Baldwin was forced to agree to a truce to ensure his safety. The Treaty of Péronne was signed in January 1200 on the condition that Baldwin receive the territories he had won during the war. Baldwin was made the vassal of Philip II, and the king returned portions of Artois to Baldwin.

In this fight against the French king, Baldwin allied with others who had quarrels with Philip, including kings Richard I and John of England, and the German King Otto IV. A month after the treaty, on Ash Wednesday (23 February) 1200 in the town of Bruges, Baldwin 'took the cross', meaning he committed to embark on a crusade, namely the Fourth Crusade. He spent the next two years preparing, finally leaving on 14 April 1202.

As part of his effort to leave his domains in good order, Baldwin issued two notable charters for Hainaut. One detailed an extensive criminal code and appears to be based on a now-lost charter of his father. The other laid down specific rules for inheritance. These are an important part of the legal tradition in Belgium.

Baldwin left behind his two-year-old daughter and his pregnant wife, Countess Marie. Marie was regent for Baldwin for the two years she remained in Flanders and Hainaut, but by early 1204, she had left both her children behind to join him in the East. They expected to return in a couple of years, but in the end, neither would see their children or their homeland again. In their absence, Baldwin's younger brother Philip of Namur was regent in Flanders, with custody of the daughters. Baldwin's uncle William of Thy (an illegitimate son of Baldwin IV of Hainaut) was regent for Hainaut.

Meanwhile, desperate for funds to support themselves and pay for their expenses, the leaders of the Fourth Crusade were persuaded by the Venetians (who had built the crusaders' fleet) to divert to Constantinople. The Venetians had had designs on the Byzantine capital for some time, and also wished to revenge themselves for the Massacre of the Latins in 1182. The political excuse for this excursion was in large part due to the exiled Byzantine prince Alexios (the future Emperor Alexios IV Angelos), who promised the crusaders supplies, money, and the island of Crete in return for their help in ousting his uncle Emperor Alexios III Angelos and freeing his imprisoned father Isaac II Angelus. In April 1204, after numerous failed negotiations attempting to obtain the promised funds from the Byzantines, the Crusaders conquered the most powerfully protected city in the world. Stunned at their own success and unsure of what to do next, the leaders adopted a similar track as their forefathers had during the First Crusade. They elected one of their own, Count Baldwin of Flanders as emperor (of what modern historians refer to as the Latin Empire) and divided imperial lands into feudal counties.

== Latin emperor ==
The imperial crown was at first offered to Enrico Dandolo, Doge of Venice, who refused it. The choice then lay between Baldwin and the nominal leader of the crusade, Boniface of Montferrat. While Boniface was considered the most probable choice, due to his connections with the Byzantine court, Baldwin was young, gallant, pious, and virtuous, one of the few who interpreted and observed his crusading vows strictly, and the most popular leader in the host. With Venetian support, he was elected on 9 May 1204 and crowned on 16 May in the Hagia Sophia at a ceremony which closely followed Byzantine practices. During his coronation, Baldwin wore a very rich jewel that had been bought by Byzantine Emperor Manuel I Komnenos for 62,000 silver marks. Baldwin's wife Marie, unaware of these events, had sailed to Acre. There she learned of her husband's election as emperor, but died in August 1204 before she could join him.

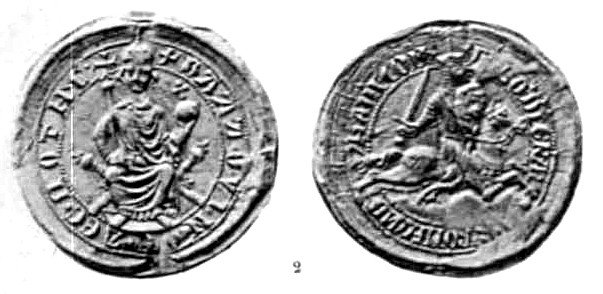
Seal of Baldwin as emperor

The Latin Empire was organized on feudal principles; the emperor was feudal superior of the princes who received portions of the conquered territory: in October 1204 he enfeoffed 600 knights who occupied lands formerly held by Greek nobles. His own special portion consisted of the city of Constantinople, the adjacent regions both on the European and the Asiatic side, along with some outlying districts, and several islands including Lemnos, Lesbos, Chios and Tenos. The territories still had to be conquered; first of all, it was necessary to break the resistance of the Greeks in Thrace and secure Thessalonica. In this enterprise in the summer of 1204, Baldwin came into collision with Boniface of Montferrat, the rival candidate for the empire, who received a large territory in Macedonia with the title of king of Thessalonica.

Boniface hoped to make himself quite independent of the empire and do no homage to his kingdom, and he opposed Baldwin's proposal to march to Thessalonica. The antagonism between Flemings and Lombards aggravated the quarrel. Baldwin insisted on going to Thessalonica; Boniface laid siege to Adrianople, where Baldwin had established a governor; civil war seemed inevitable. An agreement was effected by the efforts of Dandolo and Count Louis I of Blois. Boniface received Thessalonica as a fief from the emperor and was appointed commander of the forces which were to march to the conquest of Greece.

During the following winter (1204–1205) the Franks prosecuted conquests in Bithynia, in which Henry, Baldwin's brother, took part. But in February the Greeks revolted in Thrace, relying on the assistance of Kaloyan, tsar of Bulgaria, whose overtures of alliance had been rejected by the emperor. The garrison of Adrianople was expelled. Baldwin along with Dandolo, the count of Blois, and Marshal Villehardouin, the historian, marched to besiege that city. The Frankish knights were defeated (14 April 1205); the count of Blois was slain, and the emperor was captured by the Bulgarians (see Battle of Adrianople).

== Captivity and death ==
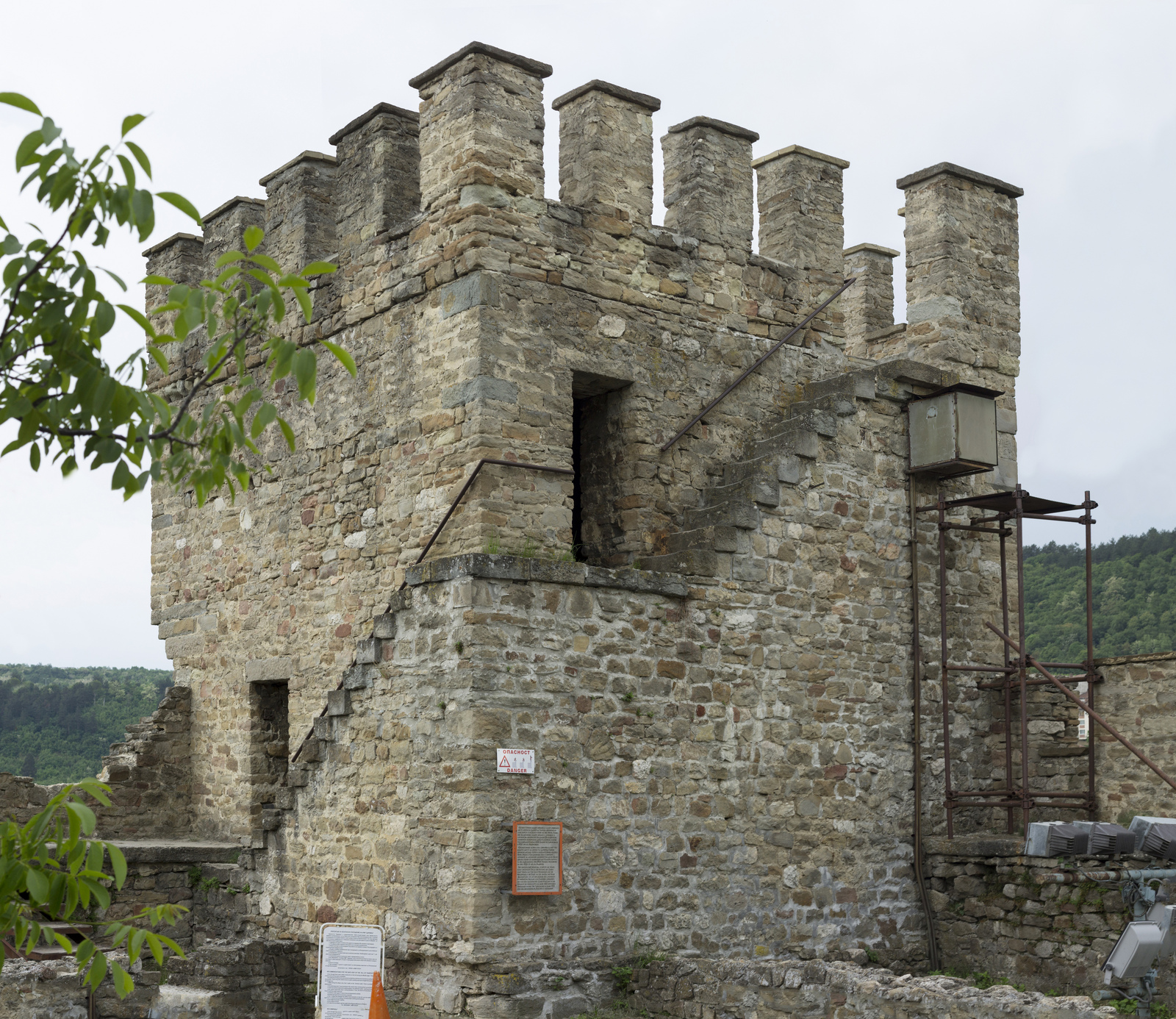
Baldwin's Tower in the Tsarevets castle, Veliko Tarnovo, Bulgaria

For some time, Baldwin's fate was uncertain, and in the meanwhile Henry, his brother, assumed the regency. Not until the middle of July the following year was it ascertained that he was dead.

The circumstances of Baldwin's death are not exactly known. There are several accounts of his fate; one being that he was at first treated well as a prisoner by Kaloyan despite refusing to release him at the request of the Pope—another says Kaloyan had Baldwin's hands and feet cut off and thrown in a ditch to die, while a third account says he refused the advances of the Bulgarian queen who then accused him of rape and had him executed. The historian George Acropolites reports that the Tsar had Baldwin's skull made into a drinking cup, just as had happened to Nicephorus I almost four hundred years before.

Kaloyan wrote to Pope Innocent III, reporting that Baldwin had died in prison. A tower of the Tsarevets fortress of the medieval Bulgarian capital, Veliko Tarnovo, is still called Baldwin's Tower; supposedly, it was the tower where he was interned.

It was not until July 1206 that the Latins in Constantinople had reliable information that Baldwin was dead. His brother Henry was crowned emperor in August.

Back in Flanders, however, there seemed to be doubt whether Baldwin was truly dead. In any case, Baldwin's other brother Philip of Namur remained as regent, and eventually, both of Baldwin's daughters, Joan and Margaret II, were to rule as countesses of Flanders.

Twenty years later, in 1225, a man appeared in Flanders claiming to be the presumed dead Baldwin. His claim soon became entangled in a series of rebellions and revolts in Flanders against the rule of Baldwin's daughter Jeanne. A number of people who had known Baldwin before the crusade rejected his claim, but he nonetheless attracted many followers from the ranks of the peasantry. Eventually unmasked as a Burgundian serf named Bertrand of Ray, the false Baldwin was executed in 1226.

== Notes ==
Baldwin I, Latin Emperor House of Flanders Born: July 1172 Died: c.1205
Regnal titles
Preceded by Alexios V as Byzantine Emperor	Latin Emperor of Constantinople; 1204–1205	Succeeded by Henry
Preceded by Margaret I Baldwin VIII	Count of Flanders; 1194–1205	Succeeded by Joan
Preceded by Baldwin V	Count of Hainaut; 1195–1205	Succeeded by Joan
