= Marie of France, Duchess of Brabant =

Marie of France
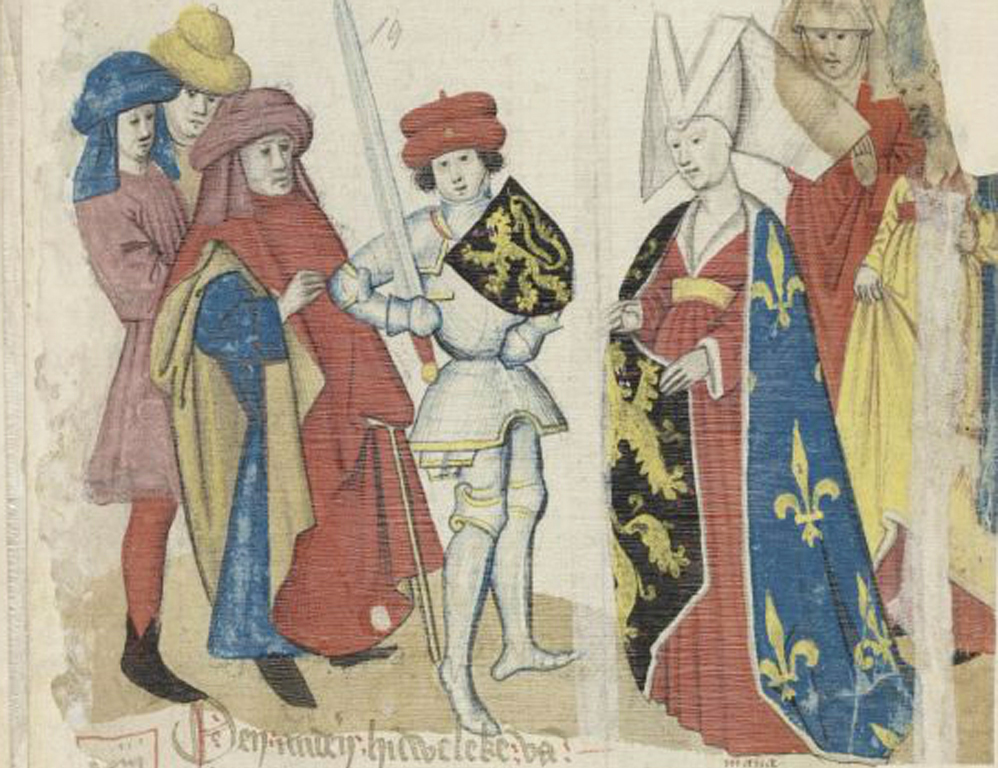

Duchess consort of Brabant
- Tenure: 22 April 1213 – 15 August 1224
- Born: 1198
- Died: 15 August 1224 (aged 25–26)
- Burial: St. Peter's Church
- Spouse: Philip I of Namur (m. 1211; died 1212) Henry I, Duke of Brabant (m. 1213)
- Issue: Elisabeth, Countess of Cleves; Marie of Brabant
- House: Capet
- Father: Philip II of France
- Mother: Agnes of Merania

Marie of France (1198 – 15 August 1224) was a daughter of Philip II of France and his disputed third wife Agnes of Merania. She was a member of the House of Capet.

== Early life and legitimacy ==
In order to marry Agnes, Marie's father Philip had to get a divorce from his neglected second wife Ingeborg of Denmark. Pope Innocent III (1198–1216) refused to grant Philip a divorce. Philip still did remarry though. His first choice was Marguerite of Geneva, but they did not marry. Philip then married Agnes in 1196. Agnes gave birth to Marie and then to her brother, Philip I, Count of Boulogne.

Innocent III declared Philip's marriage to Agnes null and void, as he was still married to Ingeborg. He ordered the King to part from Agnès; when he did not, the Pope placed France under an interdict in 1199. This continued until 7 September 1200. Needing an alliance from Ingeborg's brother, King Valdemar II of Denmark (1202–41), Philip finally allowed Ingeborg to be recognized as his Queen in 1213.

== Marriages ==
Marie's first betrothal was to Prince Alexander of Scotland (future King Alexander II); the pair were only two years of age. Alexander succeeded as King aged sixteen in 1214, his engagement to Marie having been broken off around 1202.

Marie's second betrothal was to Arthur I, Duke of Brittany, who was fighting against John for the Kingdom of England. Marie's father recognised Arthur's rights to many French lands but recognised John as the rightful King of England. Marie and Arthur were betrothed in 1202 but never married due to Arthur's disappearance and supposed death, for which John was blamed.

Marie's first marriage to Philip I of Namur in 1211, was a diplomatic move by her father, Philip II, to gain control over Flanders and Hainault.

The marriage did not produce children and Philip died in 1212.

With the death of her first husband, Marie was able to remarry. She married on 22 April 1213 in Soissons to Henry I, Duke of Brabant. This was a second marriage for them both, Henry having been widowed three years earlier by his first wife Mathilde of Flanders.

The couple had two daughters:

1. Elizabeth (1213 – 23 October 1272), married in Leuven on 19 March 1233 Count Dietrich of Cleves, Lord of Dinslaken (c. 1214–1244), married 1246 Gerhard II, Count of Wassenberg (d. 1255)
2. Marie (b. 1214), died young

Marie died on 15 August 1224 and was buried at Affligem Abbey.
