= Isabella of Hainault =

Queen of France from 1180 to 1190

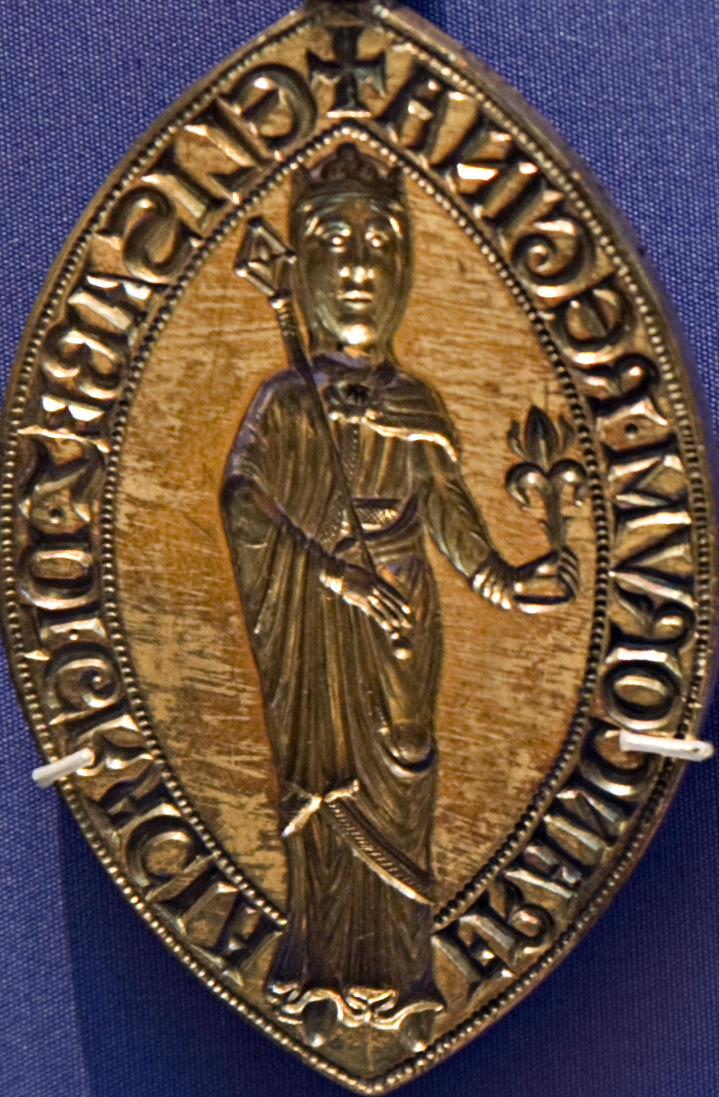
- Isabella's seal as queen shows her holding a sceptre and fleur-de-lis

Queen consort of the Franks
- Tenure: 28 April 1180 – 15 March 1190
- Coronation: 28 May 1180

Countess of Artois
- Reign: 28 April 1180 – 15 March 1190
- Successor: Louis
- Born: 5 April 1170; Valenciennes, France
- Died: 15 March 1190 (aged 19); Paris, France
- Burial: Notre-Dame, Paris
- Spouse: Philip II of France (m. 1180)
- Issue: Louis VIII of France
- House: Flanders
- Father: Baldwin V, Count of Hainaut
- Mother: Margaret I, Countess of Flanders

Isabella of Hainault (5 April 1170 – 15 March 1190; also spelled: Ysabella de Hainault, Ysabelle de Hainaut or Ysabeau de Hainaut) was a Queen of France as the first wife of King Philip II. She was also formally ruling Countess of Artois de jure between 1180 and 1190.

== Early life ==
Isabella was born in Valenciennes on 5 April 1170, the daughter of Baldwin V, Count of Hainaut, and Margaret I, Countess of Flanders. When she was just one year old, her father had her betrothed to Henry, the future Count of Champagne. He was the nephew of Adèle of Champagne, the queen of France. In 1179, both their fathers swore that they would proceed with the marriage, but her father later agreed to her marrying King Philip II.

== Queen of France ==
Isabella married the 15 year old Philip on 28 April 1180 at Bapaume, and brought as her dowry the county of Artois. The marriage was arranged by her maternal uncle Philip, Count of Flanders, who was advisor to the King. The wedding did not please the queen dowager, for it meant the rejection of her nephew and the lessening of her brothers' influence.

Isabella was crowned Queen of France at Saint Denis on 28 May 1180. She was a descendant of Charlemagne and the chroniclers of the time saw in this marriage a union of the Carolingian and Capetian dynasties, which was represented in her son Louis VIII.

Though Isabella received extravagant praise from certain annalists, she initially failed to win Philip's affections owing to her inability to provide him with an heir, although she was only 14 years old at the time. Meanwhile, in 1184, Philip was waging war against Flanders; angered at seeing his wife's father Baldwin support his enemies, he threatened to divorce her. According to Gislebert of Mons, Isabella then appeared barefooted and dressed as a penitent in the town's churches, thus gaining the sympathy of the people. Her appeals angered them so much that they went to the palace and started shouting loud enough to be heard inside. Robert, the king's uncle, successfully interposed; no repudiation followed, for repudiating her would also have meant the loss of Artois.

The marriage grew stronger with time and the young couple developed a genuine fondness for each other. Finally, on 5 September 1187, she gave birth to the desired son, Louis.

== Death ==
Isabella's second pregnancy was extremely difficult. On 14 March 1190, she gave birth to twin boys named Robert (who died the same day) and Philip (who died 3 days afterwards, on 17 March). Owing to complications in childbirth, she died in Paris the next day, 15 March, aged not quite 20, and was buried in the cathedral of Notre-Dame. She was mourned greatly in the capital, having been a popular queen. Her husband was not with her when she died, nor did he attend the funeral, as he was away in Normandy campaigning against Richard I of England. When Philip learnt of her death, he hastily signed a truce with Richard and returned to Paris, where he confirmed the placement of her tomb and spent several days in mourning before returning to Normandy the following week. In a letter to Pope Clement III, he wrote that he greatly missed his late wife.

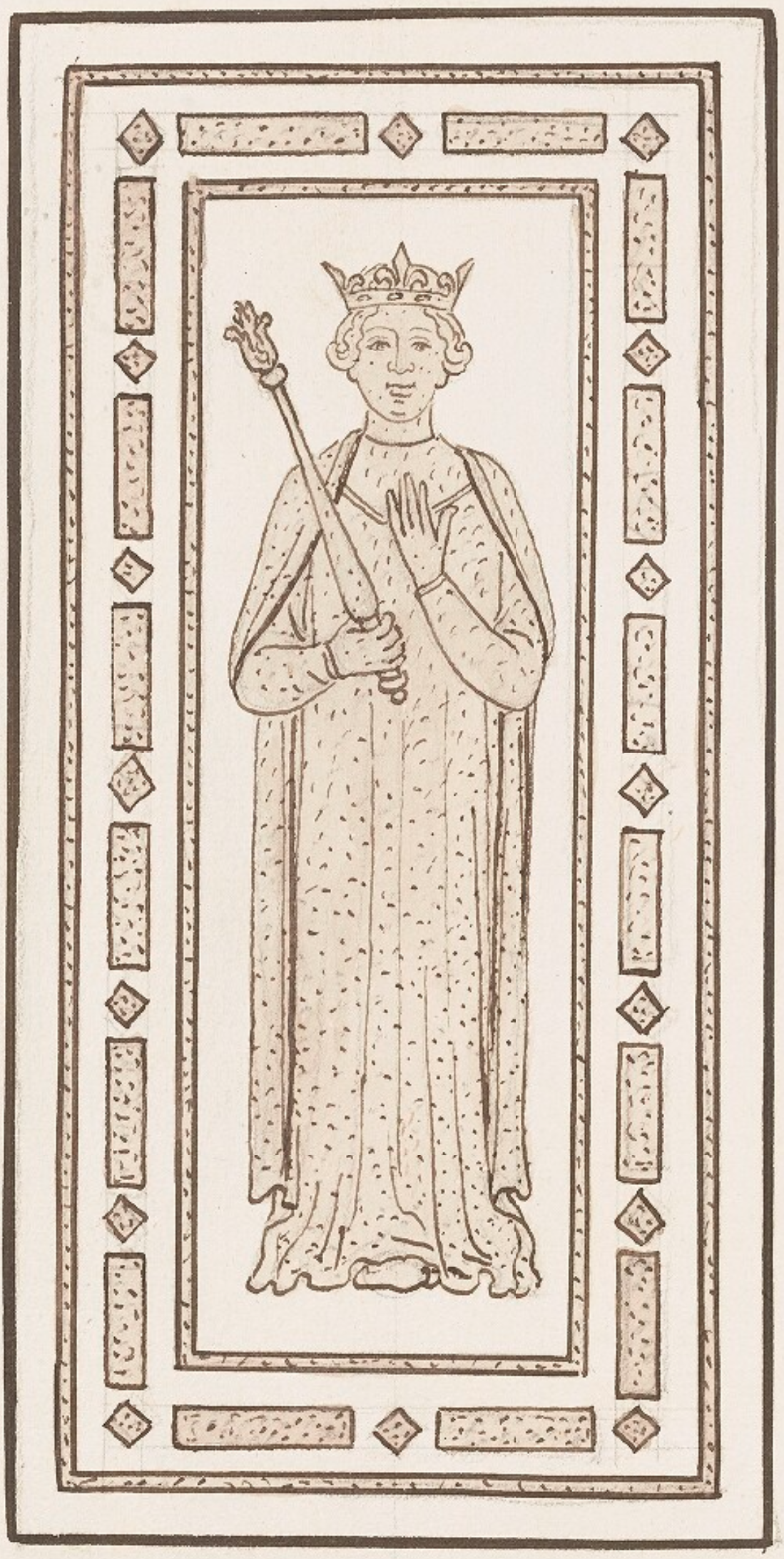
18th-century illustration of Isabella's tomb

Isabella's son Louis succeeded her as Count of Artois. Her dowry of Artois eventually returned to the French crown following the death of her husband, when her son Louis became king.

== Appearance ==
"Queen Isabelle, she of noble form and lovely eyes." In 1858, Isabelle's body was exhumed and measured at the cathedral of Notre-Dame de Paris. At 90 cm from pelvis to feet, she would have stood about 1.72-1.75 m, (5'8"-5'9") tall. It was during this exhumation that a silver seal (now in the British Museum) was discovered in the queen's coffin. Little used during her lifetime, it is one of the few medieval seals with a royal connection to survive from the Middle Ages.

== Sources ==
- Ambroise (2003). Ailes, Marianne; Barber, Malcolm (eds.). The History of the Holy War: Ambroise's Estoire de la Guerre Sainte. Vol. 1. Translated by Ailes, Marianne. Boydell Press.
- Baldwin, John W. (1986). The Government of Philip Augustus. University of California Press.
- Bouchard, Constance Brittain (1987). Sword, Miter, and Cloister: Nobility and the Church in Burgundy, 980-1198. Cornell University Press.
- Bouchard, Constance Brittain (2001). Those of My Blood: Creating Noble Families in Medieval Francia. University of Pennsylvania Press.
- Bouyer, Christian (1992). Les reines de France. Perrin.
- Bradbury, Jim (1997). Philip Augustus: King of France 1180-1223. Routledge.
- Bradbury, Jim (2007). The Capetians: Kings of France 987-1328. Hambledon Continuum.
- Hornaday, Aline G. (2003). "A Capetian Queen as Street Demonstrator: Isabelle of Hainaut". In Nolan, Kathleen D. (ed.). Capetian Women. Palgrave Macmillan.
- Nicholas, David M. (1992). Medieval Flanders. Longman.
- Schlender, Anna C. (2023). Gathagan, Laura L.; North, William; Wangerin, Laura (eds.). "The Queen of Orleans: Ingeborg of Denmark, Female Rulership, and the Capetian Monarchy". The Haskins Society Journal 33 Studies in Medieval History. Boydell & Brewer: 97–118.
- Shadis, Miriam (2003). "Blache of Castile and Facinger's "Medieval Queen": Reassessing the Argument". In Nolan, Kathleen D. (ed.). Capetian Women. Palgrave Macmillan.
- Perkinson, Stephen (2009). The Likeness of the King: A Prehistory of Portraiture in Late Medieval France. University of Chicago Press.
- Chisholm, Hugh, ed. (1911). "Isabella of Hainaut" . Encyclopædia Britannica. Vol. 14 (11th ed.). Cambridge University Press. p. 860.

French nobility
New title	Countess of Artois; 28 April 1180 – 15 March 1190	Succeeded by Louis
French royalty
Preceded by Adele of Champagne	Queen consort of France; 1180–1190	Succeeded by Ingeborg of Denmark
