= Peter II of Courtenay =

Latin Emperor in 1217

- Emperor and Autocrat of the Romans
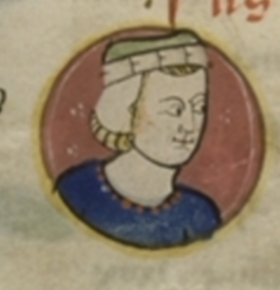

Latin Emperor of Constantinople Claimant Byzantine Emperor
- Reign: 1217
- Coronation: 9 April 1217
- Predecessor: Henry
- Successor: Yolanda
- Co-ruler: Yolanda
- Died: c. late 1217
- Spouse: Agnes I, Countess of Nevers; Yolanda of Flanders
- Issue more...: Matilda I, Countess of Nevers; Philip II, Marquis of Namur; Robert I, Latin Emperor; Henry II, Marquis of Namur; Baldwin II, Latin Emperor; Margaret, Marchioness of Namur; Elizabeth, Empress of Bulgaria; Yolanda, Queen of Hungary; Eleonore of Courtenay; Marie, Empress of Nicaea; Agnes of Courtenay
- House: Courtenay
- Father: Peter I of Courtenay
- Mother: Elizabeth de Courtenay

Peter II of Courtenay (French: Pierre de Courtenay; died c. late 1217) was emperor of the Latin Empire of Constantinople in 1217.

== Biography ==
Peter II was a son of Peter I of Courtenay (died 1183), a younger son of Louis VI of France and his second wife, Adélaide de Maurienne. His mother was Elisabeth de Courtenay, daughter of Renaud de Courtenay (died 1194) and Hawise du Donjon.

Peter first married Agnes I, via whom he obtained the three counties of Nevers, Auxerre, and Tonnerre. In 1193 he married secondly to Yolanda, a sister of Baldwin and Henry of Flanders, who were afterwards the first and second emperors of the Latin Empire of Constantinople. Peter accompanied his cousin, King Philip Augustus, on the third Crusade in 1190, returning to France in 1193. He fought (alongside his brother Robert) in the Albigensian Crusade in 1209 and 1211, when he took part in the siege of Lavaur. He was present at the Battle of Bouvines in 1214.

When his brother-in-law, the emperor Henry, died without issue in 1216, Peter was chosen as his successor, and with a small army he left his residence of château de Druyes in France to take possession of his throne. He was consecrated emperor at the Basilica of Saint Lawrence outside the Walls in Rome by Pope Honorius III on 9 April 1217. He then borrowed some ships from the Venetians, promising in return to conquer Durazzo for them, but he failed in this enterprise and sought to make his way to Constantinople by land. On the journey he was seized by the despot of Epirus, Theodore Komnenos Doukas, and, after an imprisonment, died, probably by foul means. Peter thus never governed his empire, which, however, was ruled for a time by his wife, Yolanda, who had succeeded in reaching Constantinople. Two of his sons, Robert and Baldwin, reigned in turn as emperors of the Latin Empire of Constantinople.

In late 1217, Pope Honorius III still mentioned Emperor Peter as a prisoner. Giovanni Colonna, who was also imprisoned, was released by the despot in early 1218 after negotiations. However, Peter is no longer mentioned, which suggests his death.

== Family ==
By his first wife Agnes I, Countess of Nevers he had:

- Matilda I, Countess of Nevers

By his second wife Yolanda of Flanders, of the House of Flanders he had:

- Philip (died 1226), Marquis of Namur, who declined the offer of the crown of the Latin Empire
- Robert of Courtenay (died 1228), Latin Emperor of the Latin Empire of Constantinople
- Henry (died 1229), Marquis of Namur
- Baldwin II of Constantinople (died 1273), Latin Emperor of the Latin Empire of Constantinople
- Margaret (died 1270), Marchioness of Namur, who first married Raoul, Lord of Issoudun, and then Henry I, Count of Vianden
- Elizabeth of Courtenay who married Walter, count of Bar and then Eudes sire of Montagu
- Yolanda de Courtenay, who married Andrew II of Hungary, King of Hungary and King of Croatia
- Eleonore of Courtenay, who married Philip of Montfort, Lord of Tyre
- Marie, who married Theodore I Lascaris of the Empire of Nicaea
- Agnes of Courtenay, who married Geoffrey II Villehardouin, Prince of Achaea

== Armorial ==
Arms as Lord of Courtenay

Arms of Pierre II de Courtenay as Count of Nevers, Auxerre, and Tonnerre

Arms as Latin Emperor of Constantinople

== Sources ==
- Angold, Michael (2011). "The Latin Empire of Constantinople, 1204–1261: Marriage Strategies". Identities and Allegiances in the Eastern Mediterranean after 1204. Farnham: Ashgate Publishing Limited. pp. 47–68. ISBN 9781409410980.
- Berman, Constance H. (2018). The White Nuns: Cistercian Abbeys for Women in Medieval France. University of Pennsylvania Press.
- Bouchard, Constance Brittain (1987). Sword, Miter, and Cloister:Nobility and the Church in Burgundy, 980–1198. Cornell University Press.
- Commire, Anne, ed. (1999). "Elizabeth of Courtenay (d. 1205)". Women in World History: A biographical encyclopedia. Waterford, CT: Yorkin Publications, Gale Group. ISBN 0787640808. Archived from the original on 29 March 2015 – via HighBeam Research.
- Ostrogorsky, George (1995). History of the Byzantine State. Translated by Hussey, Joan. Rutgers University Press.
- Perry, Guy (2013). John of Brienne: King of Jerusalem, Emperor of Constantinople, c. 1175–1237. Cambridge: Cambridge University Press. ISBN 9781107043107.
- Previte-Orton, C.W. (1960). The Shorter Cambridge Medieval History. Vol. II:The Twelfth Century to the Renaissance. Cambridge at the University Press.
- Rasmussen, Ann Marie (1997). Mothers and Daughters in Medieval German Literature. Syracuse University Press. ISBN 9780815603894.
- Vincent, Nicholas (1999). "Isabella of Angouleme:John's Jezebel". In Church, S. D. (ed.). King John: New Interpretations. The Boydell Press.
- Tricht, Filip Van (23 May 2011). The Latin Renovatio of Byzantium: The Empire of Constantinople (1204-1228). BRILL. ISBN 978-90-04-20323-5.

Peter II of Courtenay House of Courtenay Cadet branch of the House of Capet Born: c. 1155 Died: c. 1217
Regnal titles
Preceded by Agnes I as sole ruler	Count of Nevers, Auxerre and Tonnerre; 1184–1192 with Agnes I	Succeeded by Matilda I
Preceded by Philip I	Margrave of Namur; 1212–1216 with Yolanda	Succeeded by Philip II
Preceded by Henry	Latin Emperor of Constantinople; 1217 with Yolanda	Succeeded by Yolanda as sole ruler
