= Ingeborg of Denmark, Queen of France =

Queen of France (1193, 1200–1223)

Ingeborg of Denmark
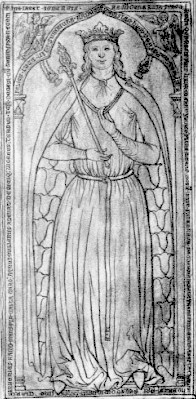

Queen consort of France
- Tenure: 15 August 1193 – 5 November 1193
- Coronation: 25 August 1193
- Tenure: 1200 – 14 July 1223
- Born: 1174
- Died: 29 July 1237 (aged 62–63); Priory of Saint-Jean-de-l’Ile
- Burial: Church of Saint-Jean-de-l’Ile
- Spouse: Philip II of France (m. 1193; died 1223)
- House: House of Estridsen
- Father: Valdemar I of Denmark
- Mother: Sophia of Minsk

Ingeborg of Denmark (French: Ingeburge; 1174 – 29 July 1237) was Queen of France by marriage to Philip II of France. She was the daughter of Valdemar I of Denmark and Sophia of Minsk.

== Marriage ==
Ingeborg was married to Philip II Augustus of France on 14 August 1193, after the death of Philip's first wife Isabelle of Hainaut (d. 1190). Her marriage brought a large dowry from her brother King Canute VI of Denmark. Stephen of Tournai described her as "very kind, young of age but old of wisdom." On the day after his marriage to Ingeborg, King Philip changed his mind, wished to obtain a separation and attempted to send her back to Denmark. Outraged, Ingeborg fled to a convent in Soissons, from where she protested to Pope Celestine III.

Three months after the wedding, Philip summoned an ecclesiastical council in Compiègne and had it draw a false family tree to show that he and Ingeborg would have been related through Philip's first wife. Contemporary Canon law stated that a man and a woman could not marry if they shared an ancestor within the last seven generations. The council therefore declared the marriage void.

Ingeborg protested again and the Danes sent a delegation to meet Pope Celestine III. They convinced him that the spurious family tree was false but the pope merely declared the annulment invalid and prohibited Philip from marrying again. Philip ignored the Pope's verdict. Ingeborg spent the next 20 years in virtual imprisonment in various French castles. At one stage she spent more than a decade in the castle of Étampes southwest of Paris. Her brother Knud VI and his advisers continually worked against the annulment. Contemporary sources also indicate that many of Philip's advisers in France supported Ingeborg.

Political reasons for this royal marriage are disputed, but Philip probably wanted to gain better relations with Denmark because the countries had been on different sides in the schism of the future succession to the throne of the Holy Roman Empire. Possibly he also wanted more allies against the rival Angevin dynasty. As a dowry, he had asked for the support of the Danish fleet for a year and the right to any remaining claims Denmark had to the throne of England. Ingeborg's brother Knud VI agreed only to a dowry of 10.000 silver marks. Marriage had been negotiated through Philip's adviser Bernard of Vincennes and Guillaume, the abbot of the Danish monastery of Æbelholt.

A page from the psalter of Ingeborg of Denmark

== Her defense ==
Pope Celestine defended the Queen, but was able to do little for her. Indeed, Philip asked Pope Celestine III for an annulment on the grounds of non-consummation "per maleficium", impotence caused by sorcery. (Historians have presented many theories for the alleged lack of consummation from temporary impotence to bouts of sweating sickness). Philip had not reckoned with Ingeborg, however; she insisted that the marriage had been consummated, and that she was his wife and the rightful Queen of France.

The Franco-Danish churchman William of Æbelholt (c. 1127 – 1203) intervened in the case. The genealogy of the Danish kings which William drew up on this occasion to disprove the alleged impediment of consanguinity and two books of his letters, some of which deal with this affair, can be found in the Patrologia Latina.

Philip married Agnes of Merania in June 1196. In that same year, Ingeborg wrote to Pope Celestine III, declaring her grief over this event. This letter was one of a handful of Ingeborg's letters in Latin that spoke of unfair treatment regarding her marriage. Then, in 1198, the new pope, Pope Innocent III, declared that this new marriage was void because the previous marriage was still valid. He ordered Philip to dismiss Agnes and take Ingeborg back. Ingeborg had written to him, stating abuse and isolation and claiming thoughts of suicide because of harsh treatment.

Philip's response was to lock Ingeborg away in the Château d'Étampes in Essonne. Locked up in a tower, Ingeborg was a prisoner. Food was irregular and sometimes insufficient. No one was allowed to visit her, except for one occasion when two Danish chaplains were allowed to visit. Philip, meanwhile, brought Agnes back, and continued to live with her, producing a second child, a son. For these offences, Philip was excommunicated in 1200, and the kingdom was placed under an interdict. When the king did not comply, Pope Innocent III placed France under interdict in 1199 until September 1200 when Philip said he would obey. He later reneged on that promise. Although the queenship of Ingeborg was restored, she remained imprisoned. Agnes died the following year.

In 1201 Philip asked the Pope to declare his children legitimate and the Pope complied to gain his political support. However, later that year Philip again asked for an annulment, claiming that Ingeborg had tried to bewitch him in the wedding night and thus made him unable to consummate the marriage. So he asked for divorce on the grounds of witchcraft. This attempt failed as well.

== Reconciliation and later life ==
Philip reconciled with Ingeborg in 1213, not out of altruism but because he wished to press his claims to the throne of the Kingdom of England through his ties to the Danish crown. Later, on his deathbed in 1223, he is said to have told his son Louis VIII to treat her well. Later, both Louis VIII and Louis IX acknowledged Ingeborg as a legitimate queen. After this time, Ingeborg spent most of her time in a priory of Saint-Jean-de-l'Ile which she had founded. It was close to Corbeil on an island in Essonne. She survived her husband by 14 years.

Ingeborg of Denmark died in either 1237 or 1238 and was buried in the Church of the Order of St John in Corbeil (Église de l'ordre de Saint-Jean à Corbeil).

== See also ==
- Ingeborg Psalter

== Other sources ==
- Alex Sanmark The Princess in the Tower (History Today February 2006)
- Gérard Morel (1987) Ingeburge, la reine interdite (Payot, collection Les romans de l'Histoire) ISBN 978-2228751209

French royalty
Preceded by Isabelle of Hainaut	Queen consort of France; 1193–1193	Succeeded by Agnes of Merania
Preceded by Agnes of Merania	Queen consort of France; 1200–1223	Succeeded by Blanche of Castile
