= Diederik van Aalst =

Last count of Aalst (died 1166)

Diederik van Aalst, Dirk van Aalst, Thierry of Alost or also known as het kind van Aalst (English: The child of Aalst), was the last lord/count of the Land of Aalst.

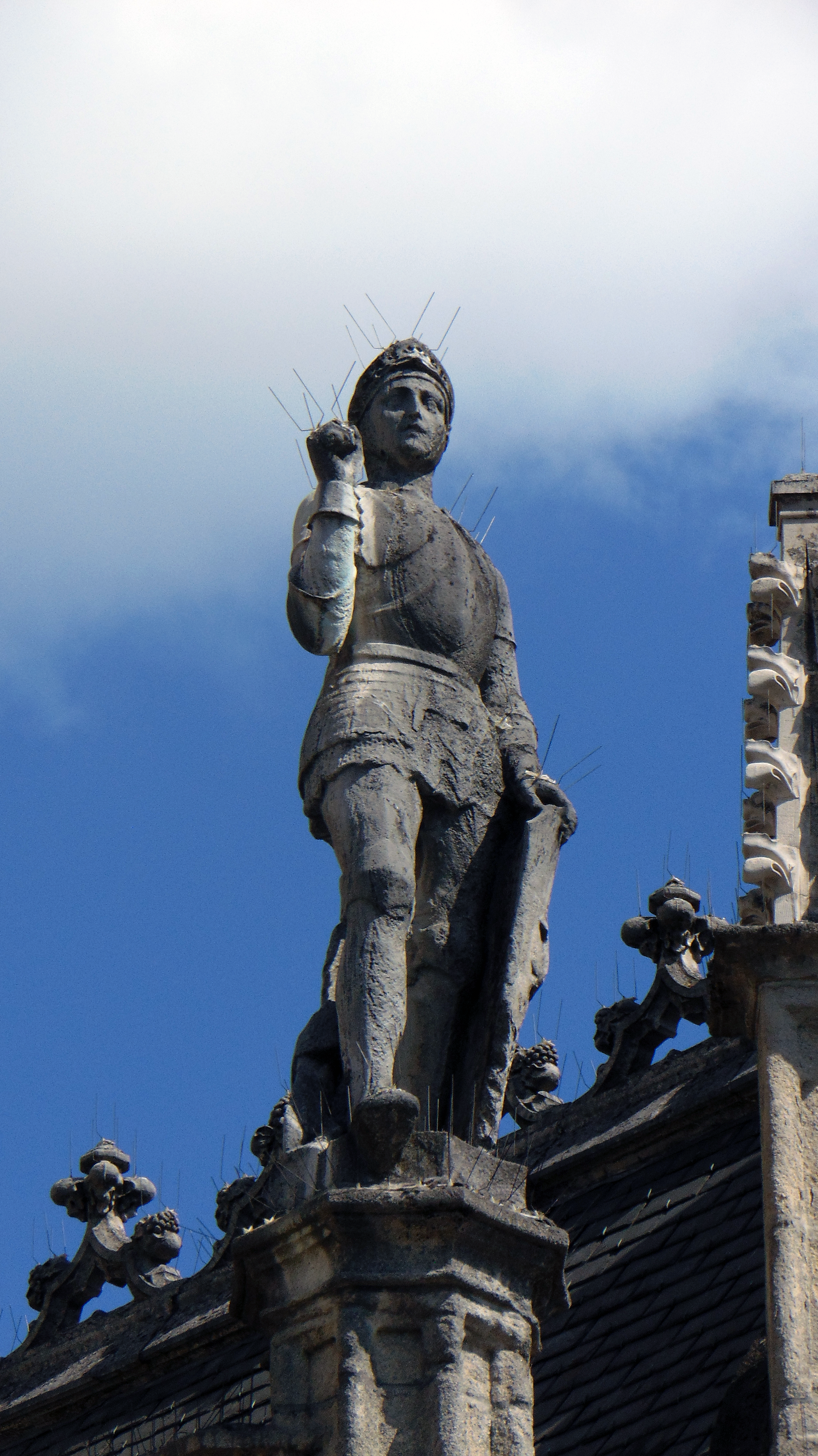
Statue of Diederik van Aalst on the Gebiedshuisje connected to the Schepenhuis of Aalst.

Diederik was a son of Iwein van Aalst and Laureta van de Elzas. He married Lauretta van Hainaut, daughter of Count Boudewijn IV and Alice of Namur. He died childless in the year 1166. Because Diederik had no heir, his belongings and the land of Aalst went to Philip of Alsace.
