= Agnes of Merania =

Queen of France from 1196 to 1201

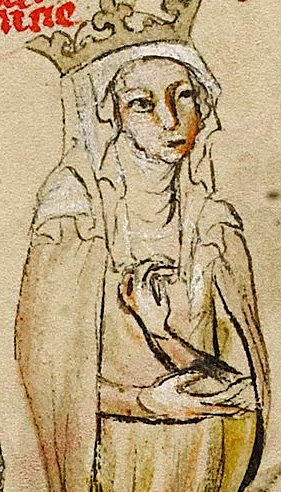

Queen consort of France
- Tenure: 1196–1200
- Born: 1175
- Died: July 1201 (aged 25–26)
- Spouse: Philip II of France (m. 1196)
- Issue: Marie, Duchess of Brabant; Philip I, Count of Boulogne
- House: Andechs
- Father: Berthold, Duke of Merania
- Mother: Agnes of Rochlitz

Agnes of Merania (1175 – July 1201) was Queen of France by marriage to King Philip II.

She is called Marie by some of the French chroniclers.

== Biography ==
Agnes Maria was the daughter of Berthold, Duke of Merania and Agnes of Rochlitz.

In June 1196, Agnes married Philip II of France, who had repudiated his second wife Ingeborg of Denmark in 1193. Pope Innocent III espoused the cause of Ingeborg; but Philip did not submit until 1200, when, nine months after interdict had been added to excommunication, he consented to a separation from Agnes.

Agnes died, possibly in childbirth, in July of the next year, at the castle of Poissy, and was buried in the Convent of St. Corentin, near Mantes.

== Family ==
Agnes and Philip had two children:

- Mary, b. 1198
- Philip I, Count of Boulogne, b 1200

Both were legitimized by the Pope in 1201.

== Sources ==
- Bradbury, Jim (1997). Philip Augustus: King of France 1180–1223. The Medieval World (1st ed.). Routledge. ISBN 978-0-582-06059-3.
- Hallam, Elizabeth (1980). Capetian France, 987-1328. Longman.
- McAuliffe, Mary (2012). Clash of Crowns: William the Conqueror, Richard Lionheart, and Eleanor of Aquitaine. Rowman & Littlefield Publishers, Inc.
- McDougall, Sara (2017). Royal Bastards: The Birth of Illegitimacy, 800-1230. Oxford University Press.
- Peters, Edward, ed. (1971). Christian Society and the Crusades, 1198-1229. University of Pennsylvania Press.
- Powell, James M., ed. (2004). The Deeds of Pope Innocent III. The Catholic University of America Press.

French royalty
Preceded by Ingeborg of Denmark	Queen consort of France; 1196–1201	Succeeded by Ingeborg of Denmark
