= Baldwin IV of Hainaut =

Count of Hainaut (1120-1171)

Baldwin IV
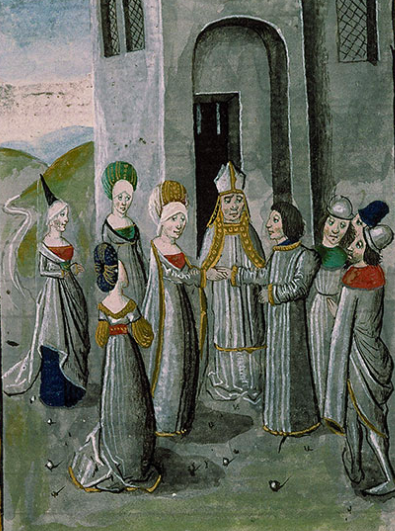
- Depiction of Baldwin IV's marriage to Alice of Namur in the Chronicles of Hainaut
- Born: 1108
- Died: 8 November 1171 (aged 62–63)
- Noble family: House of Flanders
- Spouse: Alice of Namur
- Issue: Baldwin V, Count of Hainaut
- Father: Baldwin III, Count of Hainaut
- Mother: Yolande de Wassenberg

Baldwin IV (1108 – 8 November 1171) was count of Hainaut from 1120 to his death.

Baldwin IV was the son of Count Baldwin III of Hainaut and Yolande de Wassenberg. Also known as Baldwin the Builder, he purchased the property of Ath in 1158 and built the Burbant tower. He ceded the locality of Braine-la-Willotte, also known as Braine-le-Comte, to the chapter of Sainte-Waudru in 1158. In 1159, he incorporated the seigniory of Chimay and in 1160 the châtellenies of Valencians and of Ostrevent.

== Children ==
Baldwin IV married Alice, heiress of Namur, and had the following children:

- Yolande (1131–1202), married first to Ivo II, Count of Soissons, and second to Hugh IV, Count of St Pol
- Baldwin (1134–1147)
- Agnes (1142–1168), married Ralph I, Lord of Coucy and had children including Yolande de Coucy, wife of Robert II, Count of Dreux.
- Geoffrey, Count of Ostervant (1147–1163), first husband of Eleanor, Countess of Vermandois
- Lauret(t)a (1150–1181), married first to Thierry of Alost, and second to Bouchard V, Count of Montmorency
- Baldwin V (1150–1195), also count of Flanders by his marriage to Margaret I of Flanders.

== See also ==
- Counts of Hainaut family tree

Baldwin IV of Hainaut House of Flanders Born: 1108 Died: 8 November 1171
Preceded by Baldwin III	Count of Hainaut; 1120–1171	Succeeded by Baldwin V
