= J. A. van Aalst =

Jules A. van Aalst
- Born: 14 October 1858; Namur, Belgium
- Died: after 1914
- Occupations: administrator, customs officer, postal officer, writer

Jules A. van Aalst (14 October 1858 – after 1914) was a Belgian customs and postal officer in China, known for chronicling the history of Chinese music and dance.

Van Aalst was a government administrator for the Chinese Imperial Government of the Qing Dynasty, who served in China during the late 19th century. While providing service as a government official, he chronicled the history of Chinese music and dance, serving as the primary source in the western world of Chinese music until other sources emerged in the 1950s. His most famous text is Chinese Music which was published in 1884 in Shanghai by the Statistical Dept of the Inspectorate General. Van Aalst was an official in the employ of what later came to be called the Chinese Maritime Customs Service and was during his tenure called the Imperial Maritime Customs Service. He was appointed to Postal Secretary in 1899. His boss, Sir Robert Hart, was also a music lover, creator of one of the first brass bands in China.

The Italian composer, Giacomo Puccini, used Van Aalst's text as a primary source for the Chinese musical portion of his opera, Turandot, which was first performed in 1926 and set to Carlo Gozzi's play of the same name.

== Bibliography ==
- Van Aalst, J.A., Chinese Music, Shanghai, 1884
- Van Aalst, Jules A., The Universal Language of Volapük, Amoy, 1888
