= Gislebert of Mons =

Flemish chronicler (c. 1150 – 1225)

Gislebert (or Gilbert) of Mons (c. 1150 – 1225) was a clergyman in the administration of the County of Hainaut and a chronicler whose Chronicon Hanoniense (Chronicle of Hainaut) is an essential eyewitness source for events affecting his patron Baldwin V, Count of Hainaut.

== Biography ==
Gislebert was appointed chaplain to Count Baldwin in 1169, notary at some point thereafter, and chancellor from 1178 to the count's death in 1195. From 1192, when Baldwin became margrave of Namur, he was also chancellor of Namur. He obtained the positions of provost of the churches of St. Germanus at Mons and St. Alban at Namur, in addition to several other ecclesiastical appointments. Gislebert was a confidant of the count and was also entrusted with several political missions. Among other things he took part in the Diet of Pentecost in Mainz in 1184.

During the years 1195 and 1196, Gislebert wrote the Chronicon Hanoniense, a history of Hainaut and the neighboring lands from about 1050 to 1195, which is specially valuable for the latter part of the twelfth century. Aside from the light it sheds on the life and times of Baldwin, Gislebert provides significant information about persons and affairs within France and the Empire, particularly Philip, Count of Flanders, Philip Augustus of France and Emperor Frederick Barbarossa. Gislebert's concerns for noble marriages make his chronicle an irreplaceable source for genealogical information, and in passing he gives details of the crusaders, politics, noble women, the lives of saints, relationships between lord and tenant, traditions and customs and especially military matters, with detailed accounts of sieges, campaigns and tournaments.
