= List of Lorrainian royal consorts =

Royal consorts in Lorraine

The royal consorts of the rulers of the Lorraine region have held varying titles, over a region that has varied in scope since its creation as the kingdom of Lotharingia by the Treaty of Prüm, in 855. The first rulers of the newly established region were kings of the Franks. The Latin construction "Lotharingia" evolved over time into "Lorraine" in French, "Lotharingen" in Dutch and "Lothringen" in German. After the Carolingian kingdom was absorbed into its neighbouring realms in the late ninth century, dukes were appointed over the territory. In the mid-tenth century, the duchy was divided into Lower Lorraine and Upper Lorraine, the first evolving into the historical Low Countries, the second became known as the Duchy of Lorraine and existed well into the modern era.

== Queen consort of Lotharingia ==
=== Carolingian Dynasty, 855–922 ===
Picture	Name	Father	Birth	Marriage	Became Queen	Ceased to be Queen	Death	Spouse
	Ermengarde of Tours	Hugh of Tours (Etichonids)	804	15 October 821	11 August 843; Treaty of Verdun	20 March 851		Emperor Lothair I
	Teutberga	Boso the Elder (Bosonids)	–	855	29 September 855 husband's accession	8 August 869 husband's death	before 25 November 875	Lothair II
	Ermentrude of Orléans	Odo I, Count of Orléans (Udalrichings)	27 September 823	13 December 842	8 August 869 husband's accession	6 October 869		Charles the Bald
	Richilde of Provence	Bivin of Gorze (Bosonids)	845	22 January 870		6 October 877 repudiated	2 June 910	Charles the Bald
	Emma of Altdorf	Welf (Elder Welf)	808	827	August 870 husband's accession	31 January 876		Louis the German
	Adelaide of Paris	Adalard of Paris (Girardids)	850/853	February 875	6 October 877 husband's accession	10 April 879 husband's death	10 November 901	Louis the Stammerer
	Liutgard of Saxony	Liudolf, Duke of Saxony (Liudolfings)	845	before 29 November 874	28 August 876 in the East; February 880; Sole queen after Treaty of Ribemont	20 January 882 husband's death	17/30 November 885	Louis the Younger
	Richardis of Swabia	Erchanger, Count of the Nordgau (Ahalolfings)	840	1 August 862	20 January 882 husband's accession	17 November 887 husband's desposition	18 September, between 894 and 896	Charles the Fat
	Ota of Neustria	Berengar I of Neustria (Conradines)	874	before the end of 888		8 December 899 husband's death	after 30 November 903	Arnulf of Carinthia
	Oda of Saxony	Otto I, Duke of Saxony (Liudolfings)	884	27 March/13 June 897		13 August 900 husband's death	2 July after 952	Zwentibold
	Frederuna	–	884	1/18 April 907	1 November 911 husband's election	10 February 917		Charles the Simple
	Eadgifu of England	Edward the Elder (Wessex)	902/05	7 October 919		919/23 husband's desposition	after 955	Charles the Simple
In 922, Lotharingia was subsumed into the Kingdom of Germany.

== Duchess consort of Lorraine ==
=== House of Ardennes-Metz, 959–1033 ===
Picture	Name	Father	Birth	Marriage	Became Queen	Ceased to be Queen	Death	Spouse
	Beatrice of Bar	Frederick II, Duke of Upper Lorraine (Ardennes-Bar)	1017	1054	1065 husband's accession	1069 husband's death	18 April 1076	Godfrey III

== Duchess consort of Lower Lorraine ==
=== Matfriding dynasty, 959–973 ===
Picture	Name	Father	Birth	Marriage	Became Duchess	Ceased to be Duchess	Death	Spouse
	Alpaide	–	–	–	959 duchy's division	964 husband's death	–	Frederick
The name of Richar's wife is not known (964–973)								Richar

- Interregnum (973–977)

=== Carolingian dynasty, 977–1012 ===
Picture	Name	Father	Birth	Marriage	Became Duchess	Ceased to be Duchess	Death	Spouse
	–	Robert of Vermandois (Carolingian)	950s	970s	May 977 husband's accession	970s?		Charles
	Adelaide	a low-ranking vassal of Hugh Capet	–	–		–		Charles
	Bonne of Verdun?	Godfrey I, Count of Verdun (Ardennes-Verdun)	–	–	–		991 husband's resignation	Charles
The name of Otto's wife is not known, he may have had a daughter with her (991–1012)								Gothelo I

=== House of Ardennes-Verdun, 1012–1046 ===
Picture	Name	Father	Birth	Marriage	Became Duchess	Ceased to be Duchess	Death	Spouse
The name of Gothelo's wife is not known, the name Barbe de Lebarten (and in fact her entire ancestry), being a spurious concoction of later genealogists (26 September 1023 – 19 April 1044)								Gothelo I

=== House of Luxembourg, 1046–1065 ===
Picture	Name	Father	Birth	Marriage	Became Duchess	Ceased to be Duchess	Death	Spouse
	Gerberga of Boulogne	Eustace I, Count of Boulogne (Boulogne)	–	–	1046 husband's accession	1049		Frederick
	Ida of Saxony	Bernard II, Duke of Saxony (Billung)	–	1055		18 May 1065 husband's death	31 July 1102	Frederick

=== House of Ardennes-Verdun, 1065–1076 ===
Picture	Name	Father	Birth	Marriage	Became Duchess	Ceased to be Duchess	Death	Spouse
	Beatrice of Bar	Frederick II, Duke of Upper Lorraine (Ardennes-Bar)	1017	mid 1054	18 May 1065 husband's accession	30 December 1069 husband's death	18 April 1076	Godfrey III
	Matilda of Tuscany	Boniface III, Margrave of Tuscany (Canossa)	1046	May 1069	30 December 1069 husband's accession	26/27 February 1076 husband's death	24 July 1115	Godfrey IV

=== Salian Dynasty, 1076–1087 ===
- None

=== House of Boulogne, 1087–1096 ===
- None
- Interregnum (1096–1101)

=== House of Limburg, 1101–1106 ===
Picture	Name	Father	Birth	Marriage	Became Duchess	Ceased to be Duchess	Death	Spouse
	Adelaide of Podenstein	Botho, Count of Pottenstein	1061	–	July 1101 husband's accession	1106 husband's desposition	after 13 August 1106	Henry I

=== House of Leuven, 1106–1129 ===
Picture	Name	Father	Birth	Marriage	Became Duchess	Ceased to be Duchess	Death	Spouse
	Ida of Chiny	Otto II, Count of Chiny (Chiny)	1078	1099/1105	1106 husband's accession	1117/25		Godfrey VI
	Clementia of Burgundy	William I, Count of Burgundy (Ivrea)	1070/78	1120/25		1129 husband's abdication	1129/33	Godfrey VI

=== House of Limburg, 1125/29–1139 ===
Picture	Name	Father	Birth	Marriage	Became Duchess	Ceased to be Duchess	Death	Spouse
	Judith of Guelders, heiress of Wassenberg	Gerard I, Count of Guelders (Dampierre)	1087	1107/10	1125/29 husband's ascession	16 July 1139 husband's death	24 June 1151	Waleran II

=== House of Leuven, 1139–1190 ===
Picture	Name	Father	Birth	Marriage	Became Duchess	Ceased to be Duchess	Death	Spouse
	Luitgarde of Sulzbach	Berengar II of Sulzbach (Babenberg)	1109	1139	16 July 1139 husband's ascession	13 June 1142 husband's death	1162/63	Godfrey VII
	Margaret of Limburg	Henry II of Limburg (Limburg)	1135	1155/58		1172		Godfrey VIII
	Imagina of Loon	Louis I, Count of Loon (Loon)	–	1180		21 August 1190 husband's death	5 June 1214	Godfrey VIII
Lower Lotharingia ceased to exist and had lost its territorial authority at the Diet of Schwäbisch Hall. Later duchesses were called the Duchess of Lothier, who were also the Duchess of Brabant and Limburg.

== Duchess consort of (Upper) Lorraine ==
=== House of Ardennes-Bar, 959–1033 ===
Picture	Name	Father	Birth	Marriage	Became Duchess	Ceased to be Duchess	Death	Spouse
	Beatrice of Paris	Hugh the Great (Robertians)	938–940	10 September/12 November 954	959 duchy divided	18 May 978 husband's death	23 September 1003	Frederick I
	Richilde of Metz	Folmar III, Count of Bliesgau and Metz (Metz)	–	985/992		between 11 April 1026 and 12 January 1027 husband's death	–	Theodoric I
	Matilda of Swabia	Herman II, Duke of Swabia (Conradines)	988/995	1012–1016	1019 husband's accession	17/18 May 1026 husband's death	20 July 1031/1032	Frederick II

=== House of Ardennes-Verdun, 1033–1046 ===
Picture	Name	Father	Birth	Marriage	Became Duchess	Ceased to be Duchess	Death	Spouse
The name of Gothelo's wife is not known, the name Barbe de Lebarten (and in fact her entire ancestry), being a spurious concoction of later genealogists (1033 – 19 April 1044)								Gothelo I
	Doda	–	–	–	19 April 1044 husband's accession	1047 husband's desposition by the Emperor	1053	Godfrey

=== House of Ardennes-Metz, 1047–1453 ===
Picture	Name	Father	Birth	Marriage	Became Duchess	Ceased to be Duchess	Death	Spouse
No indication has been found of the name of Duke Adalbert's wife. In 1960, Szabolcs de Vajay hypothesized that Adalbert was count of Longwy and father-in-law of William VII, Duke of Aquitaine and William I, Count of Burgundy, and that his wife was the said Clémence of Foix, daughter of the Count of Foix. (Annales de Bourgogne, Vol 32 (1960) 258–261), and has been followed in this by Frederick Lewis Weis, Ancestral Roots of Certain American Colonists Who Came to America Before 1700, Line 144-22. However, de Vajay subsequently published an unqualified retraction of his hypothesis in "Parlons encore d'Etiennette" in Onomastioque et Parente dans l'Occident medieval (Prosopographica et Genealogica, no.3), K. S. B. Keats-Rohan and C. Settipani, eds. (2000), pp. 2–6.								Adalbert
	Hedwig of Namur	Albert I, Count of Namur (Namur)	1005/10	–	1048 husband's accession	6 March 1070 husband's death	28 January 1080	Gerard
	Hedwig of Formbach	Frederick, Count of Formbach (Formbach)	–	1075/1080		1090/93		Theodoric II
	Gertrude of Flanders	Robert I, Count of Flanders (Flanders)	1080	15 August 1095		23 January 1115 husband's death	1117	Theodoric II
	Adelaide of Leuven	Henry III, Count of Leuven (Leuven)	before 1095	1112/13	23 January 1115 husband's accession	13 April 1138 husband's death	4 November, after 1158	Simon I
	Bertha of Lorraine	Frederick II, Duke of Swabia (Hohenstaufen)	1123	25 March 1139		13 May 1176 husband's death	18 October 1194 or 25 March 1195	Matthias I
	Agnes of Veldenz	Gerlach I, Count of Veldenz (Veldenz)	–	–	13 May 1176 husband's accession	–		Simon II
	Ida of Mâcon	Gerard I, Count of Mâcon and Vienne (Mâcon)	–	after 1190		1205 husband's abdication	1227	Simon II
	Wierzchoslawa Ludmilla of Greater Poland	Mieszko III the Old (Piast)	before 1153	1167	1205 husband's accession	7 April 1206 husband's death	before 1211/1223	Frederick I
	Agnes of Bar	Theobald I, Count of Bar (Scarponnois)	1177	before mid-July 1189	7 April 1206 husband's accession	10 October 1213 husband's death	19 June 1226	Frederick II
	Gertrude of Dagsburg	Albert II, Count of Dasbourg and Metz (Dagsburg)	1190 or May 1205	1206 or 1215	10 October 1213 husband's accession	17 February 1220 husband's death	30 March 1225	Theobald I
	Catherine of Limburg	Waleran III, Duke of Limburg (Limburg)	1215	August 1225		24 June 1251 husband's death	18 April 1255	Matthias II
	Margaret of Navarre	Theobald I of Navarre (Champagne)	1240	10 July 1255		31 December 1302 husband's death	3 October 1307	Frederick III
	Isabella de Rumigny	Hugh de Rumigny (Rumigny)	June 1263	23 May 1278	31 December 1302 husband's accession	13 May 1312 husband's death	after 7 December 1325	Theobald II
	Elisabeth of Austria	Albert I of Germany (Habsburg)	1285	1304 or 6 August 1306	13 May 1312 husband's accession	23 August 1328 husband's death	19 May 1353	Frederick IV
	Eleanor of Bar	Edward I, Count of Bar (Scarponnois)	–	25 June 1329		15 September 1333		Rudolph
	Marie of Blois-Châtillon	Guy I, Count of Blois (Blois-Châtillon)	1323	30 May 1334		26 August 1346 husband's death	1363/1380	Rudolph
	Sophie of Württemberg	Eberhard II, Count of Württemberg (Württemberg)	1343	16 December 1361		26 April or 26/27 July 1369		John I
	Margaret of the Palatinate	Rupert of Germany (Wittelsbach)	1376/79	5 February 1394		25 January 1431 husband's death	26/27 August 1434	Charles II

=== House of Vaudemont, 1473–1737 ===
Picture	Name	Father	Birth	Marriage	Became Duchess	Ceased to be Duchess	Death	Spouse
	Joan, Countess of Tancarville	William, Count of Tancarville (Harcourt)	–	9 September 1471	24 July 1473 husband's accession	1485 marriage annulled	8 November 1488	René II
	Philippa of Guelders	Adolf, Duke of Guelders (Egmond)	9 November 1464	1 September 1485		10 December 1508 husband's death	26 February 1547	René II
	Renée de Bourbon	Gilbert, Count of Montpensier (Bourbon-Montpensier)	1494	26 June 1515		26 May 1539		Antoine
	Christina of Denmark	Christian II of Denmark (Oldenburg)	November 1521	10 July 1541	14 June 1544 husband's accession	12 June 1545 husband's death	10 December 1590	Francis I
	Claude of France	Henry II of France (Valois)	12 November 1547	19 January 1559		21 February 1575		Charles III
	Margerita Gonzaga	Vincent I of Gonzaga, Duke of Mantua and Montferrat (Gonzaga)	2 October 1591	24 April 1606	14 May 1608 husband's accession	31 July 1624 husband's death	7 February 1632	Henry II
	Christina Katharina of Salm-Badenweiler	Paul, Count of Salm-Badenweiler (Salm)	May 1575	1597	25 November 1625 husband's accession	1 December 1625 husband's abdication	31 December 1627	Francis II
	Nicolette of Lorraine	Henry II, Duke of Lorraine (Vaudemont)	3 October 1608	23 May 1621	1 December 1625 husband's accession	19 January 1634 husband's abdication	2 February 1657	Charles IV
	Claude of Lorraine	Henry II, Duke of Lorraine (Vaudemont)	12 October 1612	17 February 1634		2 August 1648		Nicholas II
	Béatrix de Cusance	Claude François de Cusance, Count of Champlitte, Baron of Belvoir (Cusance)	27 December 1614	9 April 1637	1661 husband's restoration	5 June 1663		Charles IV
	Marie Louise d'Aspremont-Lynden	Charles II, comte d'Aspremont (Aspremont-Lynden)	1651/52	1665		18 September 1675 husband's death	23 October 1692	Charles IV
	Élisabeth Charlotte d'Orléans	Philippe of France (Orléans)	13 September 1676	13 October 1698		27 March 1729 husband's death	23 December 1744	Leopold
	Archduchess Maria Theresa	Charles VI, Holy Roman Emperor (Habsburg)	13 May 1717	12 February 1736		9 July 1737; Duchy given to Stanislas	29 November 1780	Francis III Stephen

=== House of Leszczyński, 1737–1766 ===
Picture	Name	Father	Birth	Marriage	Became Duchess	Ceased to be Duchess	Death	Spouse
	Catherine Opalińska	Jan Karol Opaliński (Opaliński)	13 October 1680	10 May 1698	9 July 1737 husband's accession	19 March 1747		Stanislas

The House of Habsburg-Lorraine continued carrying the title as titular Dukes of Lorraine.

== See also ==
- Princess of Joinville
- List of consorts of Guise
- Duchess of Nemours
- Duchess of Elbeuf
- Duchess of Mayenne
- Duchess of Aumale
