= Osterbach =

Osterbach may refer to:

- Osterbach (Biber), a river of Bavaria, Germany, tributary of the Biber
- Osterbach (Eder), a river of Hesse, Germany, tributary of the Eder
- Osterbach (Fulda), a river of Hesse, Germany, tributary of the Fulda
- Osterbach (Gersprenz), a river of Hesse, Germany, headwater of the Gersprenz
