= Hedwig of Formbach =

- Born: c. 1058
- Died: c. 1090 (aged 31–32)
- Spouse(s): Gebhard of Supplinburg; Theodoric II, Duke of Lorraine
- Issue: Ida; Lothair II; Simon; Gertrude
- Father: Frederick of Formbach
- Mother: Gertrude of Haldensleben

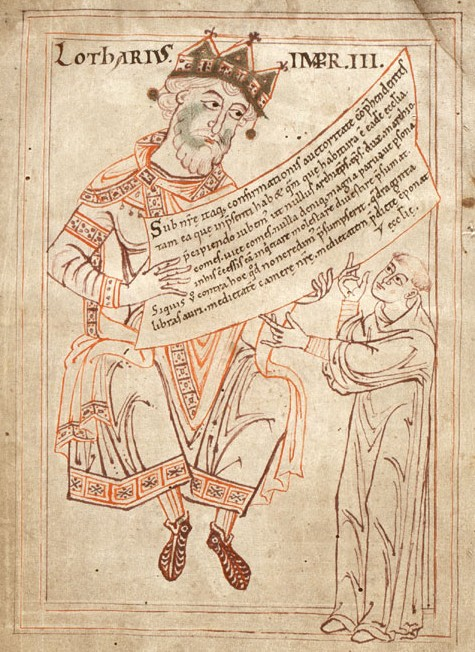
Lotar III

Hedwig of Formbach (c. 1058 – c. 1090) was the daughter of Frederick, count of Formbach and of Gertrude of Haldensleben, and heiress to Süpplingenburg Castle. She was the mother of Emperor Lothair II.

== Marriages ==
Hedwig's first husband was Gebhard of Supplinburg. According to the Sächsische Weltchronik, Gebhard had to overcome the resistance of his rivals, the counts of Goseck, relatives of Archbishop Adalbert of Bremen, who tried to have the marriage annulled. After Gebhard's death in June 1075 at the Battle of Langensalza, Hedwig married Theodoric II, Duke of Lorraine (as his first wife).

== Children ==
With Gebhard, Hedwig had two children:

- Lothair, later Holy Roman Emperor
- Ida (d.1138), who married Sighard IX (d. 1104), count of Tengling, Schala and Burghausen

With Theoderic, Hedwig had:

- Simon (1076 – 1138), who succeeded Theoderic as Duke of Lorraine, and was married to Adelaide of Leuven (d. 1158), daughter of his stepmother Gertrude and Henry III, Count of Leuven.
- Gertrude (who later changed her name to Petronilla) (died 1144), who married Floris II of Holland

== Sources ==
- Biegel, G. (1996). Heinrich der Löwe. Kaiserenkel - Kaiserfreund - Kaiserfeind. Braunschweig.
- Borchardt, Karl (2021). "Early Hospitallers in Latin Europe, 1122 and 1113/35". In Kedar, Benjamin Z.; Phillips, Jonathan; Shagrir, Iris; Chrissis, Nikolaos G. (eds.). Crusades. Vol. 19. Routledge.
- Galbert of Bruges (2013). The Murder, Betrayal, and Slaughter of the Glorious Charles, Count of Flanders. Translated by Rider, Jeff. Yale University Press.
- Silvas, Anna, ed. (1999). Jutta and Hildegard: The Biographical Sources. The Pennsylvania State University Press.
