= Hamaland =

Area of the Netherlands

County of Hamaland Graafschap Hamaland (nl)
- 9th century–11th century
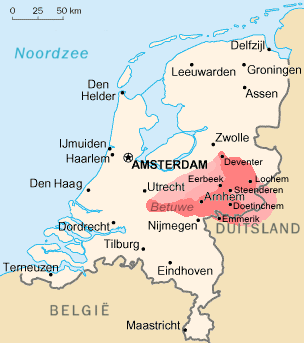
- The County of Hamaland
- Status: Vassal of Carolingian Empire
- Capital: Zutphen e.a.
- Historical era: Middle Ages
  - Established: 9th century
  - Disestablished: 11th century
Preceded by	Succeeded by
Chamavi	County of Zutphen; County of Guelders

Hamaland (also Hameland) was a medieval Carolingian vassal county in the east of the modern-day Netherlands. Its name originated from the former Chamavi inhabitants that merged into the newly formed confederation of Franks. It is located east of the river IJssel and south of Salland (the original homeland of the Frankish Salii) and Twente (the original homeland of the Germanic Tuihanti). Hamaland and the Chamavi had since late antiquity been ruled by independent kings, before being subdued by the Carolingian Franks.

== History ==
From the 9th century there was a Duchy of Hamaland, the rulers of which owned large parts of the middle, east and north of what is now the Netherlands. The same family also owned a large part of German Münsterland and more southerly estates, probably around Nassau. When the ruling Counts died out Hamaland became one of the core areas of the Dukes of Guelders, and thus became part of the Duchy of Guelders. Other lineages of the Hama-family became prominent in the Duchy of Cleve and the Bishoprics of Utrecht and Münster.

Nowadays Hamaland is part of the Dutch province Gelderland.

== List of rulers of Hamaland ==
Period	Name	Notes
Meginharding Dynasty
?	Brunhari	
c. 794–800	Wrachari	Son of Brunhari
?	Meginhard I	Son of Wrachari
c. 855	Wichman I	From the Matfriding family; possibly a son of Meginhard I
before 881	Meginhard II	Son of Wichman I
before 882 – 898	Everhard Saxo	Son of Meginhard II
898 – c. 915	Meginhard III	Brother of Everhard Saxo
c. 915 – c. 938-939(?)	Meginhard IV	Son of Everhard Saxo; revolted against King Otto I in 938–939 and was stripped of his titles
before 936(?) – 966	Wichman IV	Son of Meginhard IV; in 966 he granted the comital rights to the Imperial Abbey of Elten, a move contested by his eldest daughter Adela
Immedinger Dynasty
– 995	Immed	Husband of Adela of Hamaland, daughter of Wichman IV
995 – 1017	Diederik	Son of Immed; possibly murdered by Balderic
Non-dynastic
1017–1018	Balderic	Second husband of Adela of Hamaland
House of Verdun (Ardennes–Verdun)
1018 – 1023	Godfrey the Childless	Son-in-law of Dietrich?
1023 – 1044	Gozelo I	Brother of Godfrey
1044 – 1046	Godfrey "the Beard"	Son of Gozelo I; revolted against the Emperor and was stripped of his titles
Flamenses (House of Wassenberg)
1046 – 1052	Gerard II of Wassenberg	Son of Gerard I Flamens, married to a daughter of Dietrich
For subsequent rulers, see List of counts and dukes of Guelders
