= Gebhard of Supplinburg =

Saxon count

Gebhard of Süpplingenburg
- Count of Harzgau
- Died: 9 June 1075; Langensalza, Thuringia
- Noble family: Süpplingenburg dynasty
- Spouse: Hedwig of Formbach
- Issue: Ida; Lothair II, Holy Roman Emperor
- Father: Bernhard of Supplinburg
- Mother: Ida of Querfurt

Gebhard of Supplinburg (or Süpplingenburg; died 9 June 1075) was a Saxon count in the Eastphalian Harzgau and Nordthüringgau. He was the father of Emperor Lothair II.

== Life ==
Gebhard was the son of Count Bernhard of Supplinburg (d. about 1069) and his wife Ida of Querfurt, a niece of Saint Bruno of Querfurt. About 1052 he succeeded his father in the Eastphalian Harzgau und Nordthüringgau.

About 1060, he married Hedwig (d. 1090), a daughter of the Bavarian count Frederick of Formbach and heiress to Süpplingenburg Castle. According to the Sächsische Weltchronik, he had to overcome the resistance of the rivalling Counts of Goseck, relatives of Archbishop Adalbert of Bremen, who had the marriage annulled.

Like many Saxon nobles, Gebhard joined the Saxon Rebellion of Count Otto of Northeim and Bishop Burchard II of Halberstadt against the Salian king Henry IV of Germany. He was killed in the 1075 Battle of Langensalza by the king's forces.

The later emperor Lothair II was Gebhard's posthumous son or born shortly before his death. His widow Hedwig secondly married Duke Theodoric II of Lorraine.

== Sources ==
- Fletcher, Charles Robert Leslie (1914). The Making of Western Europe: Being an Attempt to Trace the Fortunes of the Children of the Roman Empire. Vol. 2. E.P. Dutton and Company.
- Jackman, Donald C. (2013). Gerhard Flamens (Part Two). Editions Enlaplage.
- Silvas, Anna, ed. (1999). Jutta and Hildegard: The Biographical Sources. The Pennsylvania State University Press.
