= Gerhard of the Moselle, Count of Metz =

Gerhard (or Gerard) of the Moselle (Latin Gerhardus Mosellensis), Count of Metz and possibly of Alsace (approximately 970-1025), was a Lotharingian noble active in the early 11th century. He was a key figure within an alliance of Lotharingian nobles who were seen as opponents of Henry II, Holy Roman Emperor. This also put him in constant conflict with the king's loyal representatives in Lotharingia, his relatives in the family known to historians as the House of Ardenne–Verdun. Henry II was Gerhard's brother-in-law, as they had both married daughters of Count Sigfried, the ancestor of the counts of Luxembourg. Sigfried was also in the Ardenne dynasty, though his family came to be opposed to his Verdun cousins.

Gerhard was thus a part of the rebellion of his in-laws the Luxembourg family, led by Sigfried's eldest son Henry V, Duke of Bavaria. Gerhard was also an ally of the family who had been Henry II's competitors for the throne, and who took over the crown after him, the so-called Salian dynasty. His sister's son became Conrad II, Holy Roman Emperor.

== Family ==
Gerhard's exact parentage is uncertain, but he is considered to be a relative of the so-called Matfriede and Etichonid families. The options and many speculations have been discussed in detail by Eduard Hlawitschka.

Concerning his father, Hlawitschka has defended an early modern record which says Gerhard's father was a count of Metz named Richard. This Richard corresponds to records of a Richard in this position around 970-986, who was perhaps preceded by a count also named Gerhard. Hlawitschka proposed this Richard to be a grandson of Godfrey, Count Palatine of Lotharingia, one of whose sons (possibly the one named Gerhard) was an ancestor of Emperor Henry III, according to the eleventh-century biography of Adelaide, Abbess of Vilich.

Hlawitschka believes Gerhard's mother was a sister of the wife of Hugh Raucus the Etichonid count of the Nordgau in Alsace, whose son Hugh, and grandson Pope Leo IX were described in various documents as blood relatives of descendants of Gerhard and his siblings.

Gerhard's two siblings are known.

- His sister, Adelaide of Metz, married Henry of Speyer, and their son was the future king of Germany, Conrad II.
- His brother Adalbert, count in the Saargau, succeeded Gerhard as Count of Metz. He is the earliest certain male-line ancestor of the main line of medieval Dukes of Lorraine (Upper Lotharingia), beginning with his grandson of the same name, Adalbert, Duke of Lorraine. Much later, the 18th-century House of Habsburg-Lorraine, were also direct descendants.

Gerhard married Eva (or Abenza), a daughter of Count Sigfried of Luxembourg. Their only known son, also named Sigfried, pre-deceased them, and their daughter Berscinda, became Abbess of Remiremont Abbey, where Gerhard was apparently the advocatus (German Vogt) of the abbey.

Gerhard of the Moselle. The proposal of Hlawitschka

Henry the Fowler; King of Germany	Oda	Gerhard "MATFRIEDE"	Matfried; Count of Metz	Cunigonde "ARDENNE"	Hugh "ETICHONIDS"
"OTTONIANS"	Godfrey, Count Palatine of Lotharingia	Adalbert; Count of Metz	Liutgard	Ebehard
Gerhard? Count of Metz?
Count Sigfried founder of Luxembourg	Richard? Count of Metz	Name unknown	Name unknown	Hugh "Raucus"; Count of Nordgau in Alsace
Henry V, Duke of Bavaria	Cunigunde of Luxembourg	Henry II, Holy Roman Emperor	Eva of Luxembourg	Gerhard Mosellensis; Count of Metz	Adalbert; Count in Saargau	Adelaide of Metz	Henry of Speyer	Hugh; Count of Nordgau in Alsace
Sigfried died young	Berscinda abbess	Gerhard; Count of Metz	Conrad II, Holy Roman Emperor	Pope Leo IX
Adalbert, Duke of Lorraine	Henry III, Holy Roman Emperor

== Proposed county of Alsace ==
Dietmar of Merseburg reported in his Chronicon that when Henry II claimed the crown of Germany in 1002, his main persistent opponent north of the alps was Herman II, Duke of Swabia, and that as a result of this the king gave one of Herman's counties to Count Gerhard of Alsace.

Hlawitschka has raised doubts about the traditional equation of this Gerhard of Alsace with Gerard the count of Metz, and believes this Gerhard is a first cousin, specifically a younger son of Hugh Raucus.

== Alliance with Count Balderic ==
Some time after 1010, Alpertus of Metz described the powerful man Gerhard of the Mosel, along with Count Lambert of Leuven, as companions (clientes) of Count Balderic, whose powerbase was around the area east of Nijmegen near where the Rhine and Meuse (or Maas) rivers cross the modern border of Germany and the Netherlands. This Gerhard is generally accepted to be same one who fought Duke Godefrid the childless in 1017, whose wife was a sister of the empress. He is also equated to various records naming a Gerard who was a count of Metz. (Metz is a city on the Moselle.)

Alpertus described Gerhard as Balderic's closest friend, and said that Balderic called upon him and Lambert to besiege a new fortification made on the banks of the Meuse river, by his "Saxon" rival from north of the Rhine, Wichmann of Vreden. As the situation escalated Alpertus wrote that Gerhard and Lambert "said that they would endure travails and dangers" because "these two men were always prepared to stir up any kind of commotion or rebellion". However, Alpertus had more respect for other supporters of this clique during this dispute: Heribert the Bishop of Cologne; Adalbold II bishop of Utrecht; and the emperor Henry II himself (Gerhard's brother-in-law) also supposedly gave them considerable grace.

In 1015 Count Gerhard was given control of the forts of Heimbach and Aspel (now both in Germany) to protect the interests of the widow and daughters of his relative named Godizo, who had been allied to Wichmann, and was also related to Balderic's wife Adela of Hamaland. He granted Aspel (in Rees near the Lower Rhine) to his ally Balderic. However, the widow married Gebhard, who had been a soldier of Balderic, placing Gebhard in control of the two forts, and in direct conflict with his old lord Balderic. Although Count Gerhard was able to capture the fort of Heimbach, Gebhard was able to capture Balderic and ransom him, forcing him to give up his claim on Aspel.

After Balderic lost his fort of Opladen (probably at Montferland), Gerhard and Heribert the bishop of Cologne helped Balderic. In 1017, an out-of-favour servant of Balderic managed to capture Wichmann's old fort of Monterberg (near Cleves), then under the guardianship of Duke Berhard of Saxony. Dietmar names the servant as his own first cousin Berthold, a younger son of Liuthar, Margrave of the Saxon North March. This capture gave hope to Balderic but the emperor ordered the fort to be destroyed, and Gerhard was one of the magnates asked to ensure that this took place. Subsequently Gerhard arranged for the same servant to trap Gebhard, promising to get him into the fort of Heimbach, where Gerhard, who was waiting for him, was able to kill him, avenging his friend Balderic, who had died by this time.

== Conflict with Duke Godfrey ==
Godfrey II, Duke of Lower Lorraine "the childless" was a loyalist of Henry II who ruled Lower Lotharingia. Dietmar of Merseburg described how he defeated Count Gerhard, whose men Dietmar described as bandits, in a battle which began as a judicial duel on 27 August 1017, capturing both Count Balderic, and Gerhard's son Siegfried, who was described as the empress's nephew. With Gerhard was the future king Conrad II, the son of Count Gerhard's sister Adelaide of Metz, who Dietmar says was injured by Godfrey II's forces in 1017. Among the dead was one Walter Pulverel, a follower of Gerhard from Burgundy who, according to Dietmar, dressed as a cleric and pulverised his opponents. Dietmar also reports that only 30 of Godfrey's soldiers were killed, "admittedly among the best". The chronicle of the acts (Gesta) of the bishops of Cambrai, which favoured the side of Godfrey's family, suggests that this battle was originally planned by Gerhard as a surprise attack. It also mentions that Gerhard's son Siegfried was wounded and subsequently died. It describes Gerhard's defeat as a discouragement to rebellions which had been fomented by the sisters-in-law of Henry II, including the wife of Gerhard.

In 1018, Godfrey and Gerhard were forced to make peace by the emperor, and Balderic was also reconciled with the emperor, but Godfrey II was then crushingly defeated and captured later that year when leading imperial forces against another rebel, Dirk III, Count of Holland, whose mother, like Gerhard's wife Eva, was a sister of the emperor's wife Cunegunde.

== Bibliography ==
- Hlawitschka, Eduard (1969), Die Anfänge des Hauses Habsburg-Lothringen. Genealogische Untersuchungen zur Geschichte Lothringens und des Reiches im 9., 10. und 11. Jahrhundert

Medieval works

- Alpertus of Metz, De diversitate temporum:

- Latin MGH edition: Alpertus of Metz (1841), Pertz (ed.), De diversitate temporum, MGH Scriptores, vol. 4
- Dutch translation: Alpertus of Metz (1999), Gebeurtenissen van deze tijd, translated by van Rij, Hilversum
- English translation: Alpertus of Metz (2012), Warfare and Politics in Medieval Germany, ca. 1000. On the Variety of Our Times, translated by Bachrach, David S.

- Dietmar (Thietmar) of Merseburg, Chronicon:

- Older Latin MGH edition: Thietmar of Merseburg, Lappenberg (ed.), Chronicon, MGH Scriptores, vol. 3, p. 851
- Newer Latin MGH edition: Holtsmann, ed. (1935), Chronicon, MGH SS rer. Germ. N. S., vol. 9
- English translation: Ottonian Germany. The Chronicon of Thietmar of Merseburg, translated by Warner, David A., Manchester, 2001
- German translation: R. Holtzmann,Die Chronik des Bischofs Thietmar von Merseburg und ihre Korveier Überarbeitung reproduced by Trillmich in 1957.

- Gesta episcoporum Cameracensium:

- Latin MGH edition: Bethmann, Ludwig Conrad, ed. (1846), Gesta episcoporum Cameracensium, MGH Scriptores, vol. 7
- English translation: Bachrach, David S; Bachrach, Bernard S; Leese, Michael, Deeds of the Bishops of Cambrai, Translation and Commentary
