= Theodoric II of Lorraine =

Theodoric II

Duke of Lorraine
- Reign: 1070–1115
- Predecessor: Gerard
- Successor: Simon I
- Died: 30 December 1115
- Spouse: Hedwig of Formbach; Gertrude of Flanders
- Issue Detail: Simon I, Duke of Lorraine; Thierry, Count of Flanders
- House: Metz
- Father: Gerard, Duke of Lorraine
- Mother: Hedwige of Namur

Theodoric II (died 30 December 1115), called the Valiant, was the Duke of Lorraine from 1070 to his death. He was the son and successor of Gerhard and Hedwige of Namur. He is sometimes numbered Theodoric I if the Dukes of the House of Ardennes, who ruled in Upper Lorraine from 959 to 1033, are ignored in favour of the dukes of Lower Lorraine as predecessors of the later Dukes of Lorraine.

In fact, Sophia, the daughter of Duke Frederick II of the House of Ardennes, who had inherited the counties of Bar and Montbéliard, had a husband named Louis, who contested the succession. In order to receive the support of his brother, Theodoric gave his brother the County of Vaudémont and convened an assembly of nobles, who elected him duke over Louis. Soon Louis was dead, but his son, Theodoric II of Bar, claimed the succession anyway. However, Emperor Henry IV confirmed Theodoric the Valiant in the duchy. Probably, for this reason, Theodoric remained faithful to the emperors throughout his rule. He fought the Saxons while they were at war with the Emperor between 1070 and 1078 and he generally opposed the popes Gregory VII and Urban II when they were in conflict with the Emperor.

In 1095, he planned to take up the Cross (i.e., go on Crusade, specifically the First), but his ill health provoked him to drop out, nevertheless convincing his barons to go east. Thereafter, he took little part in imperial affairs, preferring not to intervene between Henry IV and his son Henry, or against Lothair of Supplinburg, duke of Saxony.

== Marriage and children ==
His first wife was Hedwig (died 1085 or 1090), daughter of Frederick, count of Formbach. They married around 1075 and had the following issue:

- Simon (1076–1138), his successor as Duke of Lorraine, married to Adelaide of Leuven (d. 1158), daughter of his stepmother Gertrude and Henry III, Count of Leuven.
- Gertrude (died 1144), married Floris II of Holland

His second wife was Gertrude of Flanders (c.1070–1117), daughter of Robert I of Flanders and Gertrude of Saxony. She was the widow of Henry III, Count of Leuven (d. 1095), with four daughters. They married in 1106 and had:

- Thierry of Alsace "Theodoric" ( – 1168), lord of Bitche and also Count of Flanders from 1128. Married to Sibylla of Anjou
- Henry I (died 1165), bishop of Toul
- Ida, married Sigefroy (died 1104), count of Burghausen
- Ermengarde, married Bernard de Brancion
- Gisela, married Frederick, count of Saarbrücken

== See also ==
- House of Lorraine

== Sources ==
- Bogdan, Henry (2007). La Lorraine des ducs (in French). Perrin.
- Gislebertus of Mons (2005). Chronicle of Hainaut. Translated by Napran, Laura. The Boydell Press.

Theodoric II of Lorraine House of Metz Died: 30 December 1115
Preceded by Gerhard	Duke of Lorraine; 1070–1115	Succeeded by Simon I
