= County of Metz =

Historical jurisdiction

Coordinates: 49.12°N 6.18°E

The County of Metz originated from the frankish Metzgau. In the second half of the 9th century it went to the Gerhardiner (de), which held at the same time the County of Paris.

Over the Gerhardiner went the County—perhaps even in male lineage—to the Matfriede, which furthermore in 1047 received the title of Duke in Lorraine, namely Gerard IV, Duke of Alsace (c. 1030 – 1070), Seigneur of Châtenois (see also House of Châtenois).

The County of Metz was eventually merged into the Bishopric of Metz.

From 985 the city of Metz was a Free Imperial City of the German Holy Roman Empire.

== Counts of Metz ==
- Buvinus, Count of Metz, 842/862 attested (Buviniden)
- Adalhard of Metz (died 890). Children:
  - Stefan (d.a. 900), Count of Chaumont and also Bidgau ? (de); Gerhard, Matfried, Walacho and Richer (fr) (d. 945), bishop of Liège from 920.
- Gerhard I (c.870 – 910), son of Adalhard. Married Oda, widow of Zwentibold, king of Lotharingia. They had four children, including Gottfried of Jülich (c.905 – a.949).
- Matfried (died 930), son of Adalhard. Count of Metz from 926 (?). Married Lantsind, daughter of Radald and his wife Rotrud. They had three children:
  - Adalbert, Bernoin, Bishop of Verdun (d. 939) and a daughter
- Adalbert I (born c. 900, died 944), son of Matfried. Married Luitgard of Aachen (c.910 – a.960), daughter of either Wigerich III of Aachen? (d. 916/919), Count of Bidgau with Kunigunde of Lorraine, granddaughter of Louis II of France, or more likely, a less known Wideric from Bidgau-Trier, son of Roric. Children:
  - Matfried II (b.a. 944) and possibly a daughter Luitgarde
- Gerhard II (c.920 – a.963), from 963 Count of Metz, Vogt of Remiremont, son of Gottfried of Jülich (Matfriede) and grandson of Gerhard I. With an unknown wife Gerhard had two possible sons:
  - Richard and Gerhard
- Richard (or Gerhard), (950/55 – a. 986), may also be son of Count Matfried II. Vogt of Remiremont.
- 982–1022: Gerhard III (died 1024/25), son of either Count Richard, or Gerhard, son of Gerhard II, with siblings Adalbert and Adelheid (975 – 1039/46).
- 1022–1033: Adalbert II (b. 974 – 1033/37 in Bouzonville), brother or son to Gerhard III. Married Judith of Öhningen (c.975 – c. 1038). They had one registered child:
- 1033–1045: Gerhard IV (nl) (d. 1044/1045), son of Adalbert II. He married Gisela and had several children:
  - 1045–1048: Adalbert, Duke of Lorraine, Adalbert III of Metz (c.1000 – 1048), Count of Metz, possibly also Count of Longwy. Had possibly one child, Emersinde, Countess of Longwy, married possibly to Conrad I, Count of Luxembourg (c. 1040 – 1086)
  - 1048–1070: Gerhard, Duke of Lorraine, Gerhard V of Metz (d. 1070), Count of Metz
  - Conrad, Adalbero, Beatrix, Cuono, Oda, Azelinus, Ida and Adelheid, whereof some actually might be other relatives

== Counts Palatine of Metz ==
- 982-995: Folmar I, Count of Bliesgau (d. 995), Count of Lunéville and of Metz. Married Bertha and had possibly:
  - Folmar II, Stefan (d. 995), Bishop of Toul and Richilde, married in 985 to Theodoric I, Duke of Upper Lorraine.
- 995–1026: Folmar II, Count of Bliesgau (d.a. 1026), son of Folmar I, married to Gerberge, probably daughter of Godfrey I, Count of Verdun (d.c. 1002) and of Mathilde of Saxony, daughter of Hermann, Duke of Saxony
- 1029–1056: Godefroy, Count of Metz (d. 1056), son of Folmar II, married Judith.
- 1056–1075: Folmar III/VI, Count of Metz (d. 1075), son of Godefroy, married Swanechilde (Suanehilde). They had Folmar IV/VII.

== Counts (Palatine?) of Metz ==
- Folmar IV/VII (d. 1111) of Metz, son of Folmar III/VI. Count of Metz, Hüneburg, and Lunéville. He had three known children:
  - Folmar, Hugues and Theogar (d. 1120), Bishop of Metz.
- Folmar V/VIII (d. 1145), son of Folmar IV/VII. Count of Metz and Hombourg. He married Mechtild of Dagsburg (d.a. 1157), and daughter of Albert I, Count of Moha, Egisheim and Dagsburg, with Ermesinde of Luxembourg (de). Folmar and Mechtild had:
  - Hugo (d.a. 1159). Count of Homburg 1147 and Count of Metz 1157.
  - Folmar VI/IX (d.a. 1171). Count of Lunéville 1160.
  - Clementia of Metz, married to Folmar I, Count of Blieskastel. One son was Hugo I (d.a. 1220), Count of Lützelstein, and possibly Lunéville.
  - Agnes (d.b. 1180), heiress of Longwy. Married to Louis I, Count of Loon (Looz) (a.1107 – 1171). They had about seven children, including Agnes of Loon, Duchess consort of Bavaria
  - Adeleidis (d.a. 1157)
- Hugo X (fr), Count of Dagsburg, Metz, Dabo and Moha, 1137/78 attested, nephew of Folmar V/VIII. He married Luitgarde of Sulzbach, sister of Queen Gertrude of Sulzbach and widow of Godfrey II, Count of Louvain. Hugo and Luitgarde had:
- Albert II, Albert of Lichtenberg (fr) (died 1212), son of Hugo X, 1175 Count of Dagsburg and Metz. He married Gertrude of Baden (b.1160 – b.1225), daughter of Hermann III, Margrave of Baden. They had:
  - Henri and Guillaume, both dead at young age, and Gertrude, who became the heiress.
- Gertrude of Dagsburg (1190? – b. 1225), daughter of Albert II and Gertrude of Baden. She married three times: in 1206 to Theobald I (1191–1220), Duke of Lorraine since 1213 and Count of Dagsburg and Metz jure uxoris from 1216; secondly, in 1220, to Count Theobald IV of Champagne; and finally, in 1224, to Simon III, Count of Saarbrücken. All marriages were childless and Simon inherited Dagsburg, incorporating it and creating Dagsburg-Leiningen.
