= Metzgau =

Coordinates: 49.1194°N 6.1783°E

The Metzgau was a medieval Gaugrafschaft, a frankish management district, with the city of Metz as its center. The County of Metz originated from the Metzgau.

North of the Metzgau down the Moselle lay the Moselgau, whose administrative seat was temporarily Metz, wherewith a territorial overlap with the Metzgau existed at least for some time.

== Counts in Metzgau ==
- Gerhard, b. 870, d. 22 June 910, Count in Metzgau (Matfriede); m. 900 Oda of Saxony, daughter of Duke Otto der Erlauchte (Liudolfinger)
- Matfried I, b. 875, d. after 926, brother of Gerhard, 926 Count in Metzgau; m. Lantsind, daughter of Count Radald, sister of bishop Dado of Verdun

The descendants of Matfried named themselves then Counts of Metz.
