= Gertrude of Flanders, Duchess of Lorraine =

Landgravine of Brabant (c.1070 – 1117)

Gertrude of Flanders

Landgravine of Brabant Countess of Louvain Countess of Brussels
- Reign: 1090–1095

Duchess of Lorraine
- Reign: 1096–1115
- Born: c. 1070
- Died: 1117
- Spouse: Henry III, Count of Leuven; Theodoric II, Duke of Lorraine
- Issue: With Henry; Adelaide; Gertrude; With Theodoric; Theodoric of Alsace; Henry I, Bishop of Toul; Ida; Ermengarde; Gisela
- House: Flanders
- Father: Robert I, Count of Flanders
- Mother: Gertrude of Saxony

Gertrude of Flanders (c. 1070–1117), was a Countess of Louvain and Landgravine of Brabant by marriage to Henry III, Count of Leuven, and a Duchess of Lorraine by marriage to Theodoric II, Duke of Lorraine. At the time the duchy was the upper Lorraine, since 959 separated from the duchy of Lower Lorraine.

== Life ==
Gertrude was daughter of Robert I, Count of Flanders and Gertrude of Saxony. Robert was son of Baldwin V of Flanders and Adèle, a daughter of King Robert II of France, and Gertrude daughter of the Duke of Saxony. She was sister of Robert II, Count of Flanders (c. 1065 – 1111), "Robert the Crusader".

=== Leuven and Brabant ===
Gertrude married firstly Henry III, Count of Leuven (died wounded in a tournament in Tournai in 1095), of the House of Reginar. He was count of Louvain from 1078 to 1095 and landgrave of Brabant from 1085. At Henry's death, his brother Godfrey I succeeded as count and landgrave. From 1106 he also became duke of Lower Lorraine.

They had four children, probably all daughters (born about 1092-1096), assumingly including:

- Adelaide (d. 1158), wife of duke Simon I of Lorraine (1076 – 1138), son of her stepfather Theodoric with Hedwige (d. c. 1090).
- Gertrude, wife to Lambert, count of Montaigu and Clermont.

=== Lorraine ===
Secondly in 1096 she married Theodoric II, Duke of Lorraine "Thierry" (d. 1115), son of Gérard of Alsace, Count of Metz, Duke of Lorraine (-1070), of the House of Lorraine-Alsace. Thierry was a widower with a son Simon, and a daughter Gertrude. They had the following issue:

- Thierry of Alsace "Theodoric" (c. 1099 – 1168), lord of Bitche, also Count of Flanders from 1128. Married to Sibylla of Anjou, and father to Margaret I, Countess of Flanders and Matthew, Count of Boulogne
- Henry I (d. 1165), bishop of Toul
- Ida, married Sigefroy (d. 1104), count of Burghausen
- Ermengarde, married Bernard III Gros de Brancion (fr)
- Gisela, married Frederick, count of Saarbrücken.

== See also ==
- Dukes of Lorraine family tree

== Sources ==
- Rider, Jeff (2001). God's Scribe: The Historiographical Art of Galbert of Bruges. Catholic University of America Press.
- de Tournai, Herman (1996). The restoration of the Monastery of Saint Martin's of Tournai. Translated by Nelson, Lynn H. Catholic University of America Press.

Preceded by Hedwige of Namur	Duchess consort of Lorraine; 1096–1115	Succeeded by Adelaide of Leuven
Preceded by Adelheid of Orlamunde-Weimar	Landgravine consort of Brabant; 1090–1095	Succeeded by Ida of Namur
Preceded by Adelheid of Orlamunde-Weimar	Countess consort of Louvain; 1090–1095	Succeeded by Ida of Namur
