= Heinrich Franz von Mansfeld =

Austrian diplomat, Field marshal and President of the Hofkriegsrat

Heinrich Franz von Mansfeld, Prince of Fondi (Bornstedt, November 21, 1640, Vienna, June 18, 1715) was an Austrian diplomat, Field marshal and President of the Hofkriegsrat.

== Early life ==
Heinrich Franz came from the powerful House of Mansfeld, and was the second son of Count Bruno von Mansfeld (1576-1644) and his second wife, Baroness Maria Magdalena von Törring (1616-1668). Imperial Field marshal Count Philipp von Mansfeld was his uncle.

== Biography ==
He entered the Habsburg service at a young age. After a short military service, he was almost always in court or on diplomatic service. From 1680 to 1682 he was Envoy to the French court and from 1683 to 1690 to the Spanish court. Despite his very limited military experience, he was continuously promoted to higher military ranks and even became a Field marshal in 1689.

From 1684 to 1701 he was Obersthofmarschall at the Imperial court in Vienna and in 1701 he was appointed President of the Hofkriegsrat (Court War Council). In this position he repeatedly clashed with Prince Eugene of Savoy. In 1703 Mansfeld, who was unpopular with most Army generals, was relieved of this post and replaced by Eugene of Savoy. Until his death he remained as Chief Chamberlain at the Viennese court.

In 1690, he accompanied Princess Maria Anna of Pfalz-Neuburg as bride of King Charles II of Spain to her wedding in Valladolid. For this, the Spanish King awarded him the Neapolitan principality of Fondi, the title of Spanish Grandee and the Spanish Order of the Golden Fleece. The dignity of Imperial Prince granted to him, was confirmed in 1696 and 1709 and made public by Emperor Joseph I in 1711.

From 1697, he had Johann Lukas von Hildebrandt build a pleasure palace with a garden, which still unfinished, the Schwarzenberg family acquired after his death. This palace, now known as the Schwarzenberg Palace, became an important Viennese architectural monument.

== Marriage and children ==
In 1679, he married Countess Marie Louise of Aspremont-Lynden, widow of Charles IV, Duke of Lorraine. They had 2 daughters:

- Countess Maria Anna Eleonora von Mansfeld, Princess von Fondi (1680-1724), married firstly to Wilhelm Florentin, Wild und Rheingraf zu Salm (1670-1707); had issue, married secondly to Karl, Count of Colonna von Fels (d. 1713); no issue, married thirdly to Adam Anton Siegfried, Count of Auersperg (1676-1739); had issue.
- Countess Maria Eleonore von Mansfeld (1682-1747), married Prince Carl Franz Anton of Mansfeld-Bornstedt (1678-1717); had issue

== Sources ==
- Genealogie Online
- ADB
- BLKÖ
- Heinrich Franz von Mansfeld in Austria-Forum (in German) (at AEIOU)
- Säbi
