= Agatha of Lorraine =

Countess consort of Burgundy (c.1120 – 1147)

- Coat-of-arms of the House of Lorraine
- Born: c. 1120
- Died: April 1147 (aged 26–27)
- Noble family: House of Lorraine
- Spouse: Reginald III, Count of Burgundy
- Issue: Beatrice I, Countess of Burgundy
- Father: Simon I, Duke of Lorraine
- Mother: Adelaide of Leuven

Agatha of Lorraine (c. 1120 – April 1147) was the wife of her relative Reginald III, Count of Burgundy. She was the daughter of Simon I, Duke of Lorraine, and Adelaide of Leuven.

== Marriage and death ==
Agatha's children with her husband included:

- Beatrice I, Countess of Burgundy
- Two other sons and three other daughters who died in childhood

She fell sick in March 1147 and died two weeks later.

== Sources ==
- Poole, Austin Lane (1927). "England and Burgundy in the last decade of the twelfth century". In Davis, H.W.C. (ed.). Essays in History Presented to Reginald Lane Poole. Oxford at the Clarendon Press. pp. 261–273.
