= Marie Louise d'Aspremont =

- Duchess of Lorraine
- Born: 1651
- Died: 1692 (aged 40–41); Madrid
- Spouse: Charles IV, Duke of Lorraine; Heinrich Franz von Mansfeld
Names
- Marie Louise d'Aspremont
- Father: Charles II, Count of Aspremont
- Mother: Marie Françoise de Mailly

Marie Louise, Countess of Aspremont-Lynden (1651 or 1652 – Madrid, 23 October 1692), was a Duchess consort of Lorraine.

== Early life ==
She was the daughter of Charles II, Count of Aspremont-Lynden (1590-1671) and his wife, Marie Françoise de Mailly (1625-1702).

== Marriages and issue ==
On 4 November 1665 she was married to Charles IV, Duke of Lorraine, who was 47 years her senior. They had no children.

In 1679, a widow, she married Count Heinrich Franz von Mansfeld, Prince di Fondi, by whom she had two daughters:

- Countess Maria Anna Eleonora von Mansfeld, Princess von Fondi (1680-1724), married firstly to Wilhelm Florentin, Wild und Rheingraf zu Salm (1670-1707); had issue, married secondly to Karl, Count of Colonna von Fels (d. 1713); no issue, married thirdly to Adam Anton Siegfried, Count of Auersperg (1676-1739); had issue.
- Countess Maria Eleonore von Mansfeld (1682-1747), married Prince Carl Franz Anton of Mansfeld-Bornstedt (1678-1717); had issue

Preceded by Béatrix de Cusance	Duchess of Lorraine; 1665–1675	Succeeded by Eleanor of Austria
