= 1125 German royal election =

Imperial election

- 24 August – 2 September 1125

40 Electors (Note: Under the newly introduced Electio per compromissum system, 10 electors were chosen from each of the four provinces: Bavaria, Swabia, Franconia, and Saxony.) Consensus needed to win (Note: The 40 electors were tasked with agreeing on a single candidate through compromise; the final elevation of Lothair was achieved via acclamation and subsequent formal homage.)
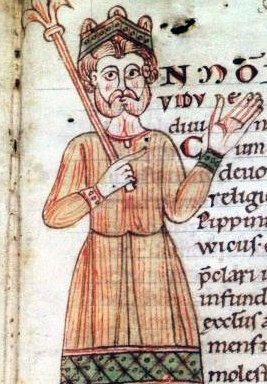

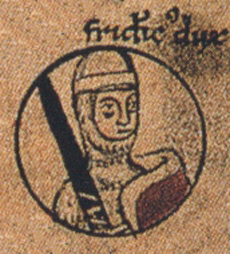

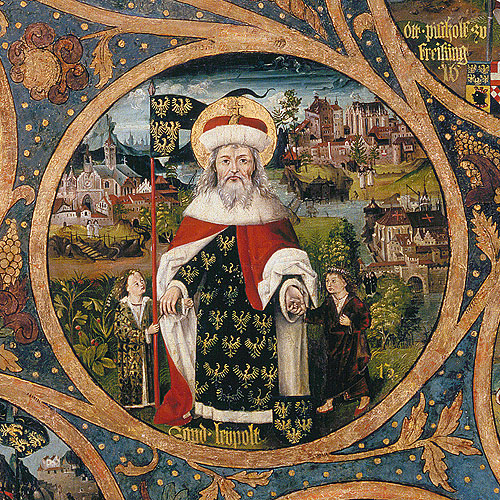
Candidate	Lothair	Frederick II	Leopold III
House	Supplinburg	Staufen	Babenberg
Result	Elected	Withdrew	Withdrew
King before election
Henry V
Salian dynasty
Elected King
Lothair III
House of Supplinburg

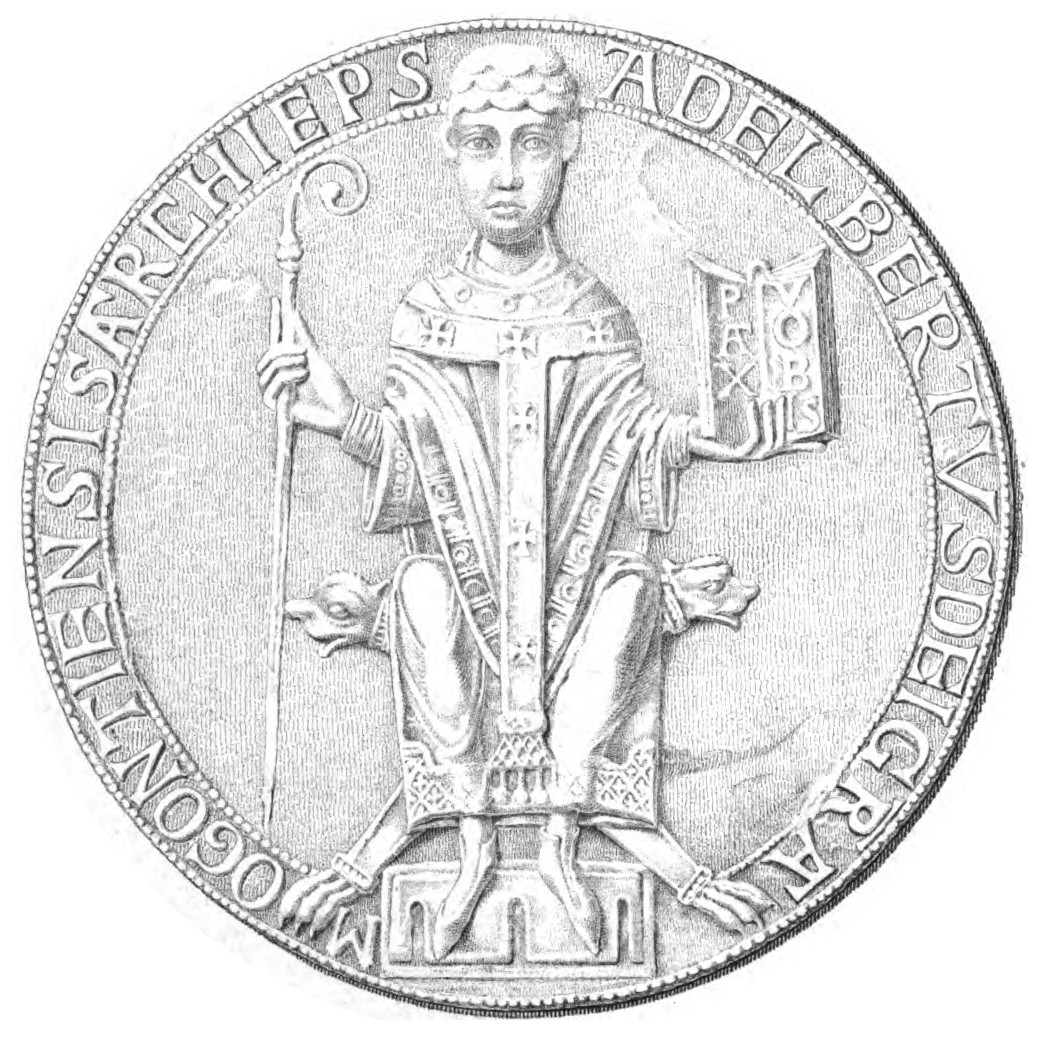
Imitation of the seal of Archbishop Adalbert I

The 1125 German royal election was the Imperial election which lasted from 24 August to 1 or 2 September 1125, following the death of Henry V. It resulted in the coronation of the Duke of Saxony Lothair of Supplinburg as the King of the Romans by the Archbishop of Mainz, Adalbert on 13 September in Aachen.

== Sources ==
The events during the election are preserved in most detail in the Narratio de electione Lotharii Saxoniae ducis in regem Romanorum (Account of the Election of Lothair of Saxony as King of the Romans), which was written by an unknown eye-witness, probably a monk at Göttweig Abbey, where the manuscript of the text was found. The manuscript was produced in the middle of the 12th century and thus at least twenty-five years after the events it describes. The detailed content of the account and the author's unawareness of the conflict between Lothair and the Staufen brothers Frederick II and Conrad III indicates that the original text was written before the end of 1125 and that the surviving manuscript must be a copy of it. Further accounts of events during the election are provided by the Orderic Vitalis and Otto of Freising.

== Background ==
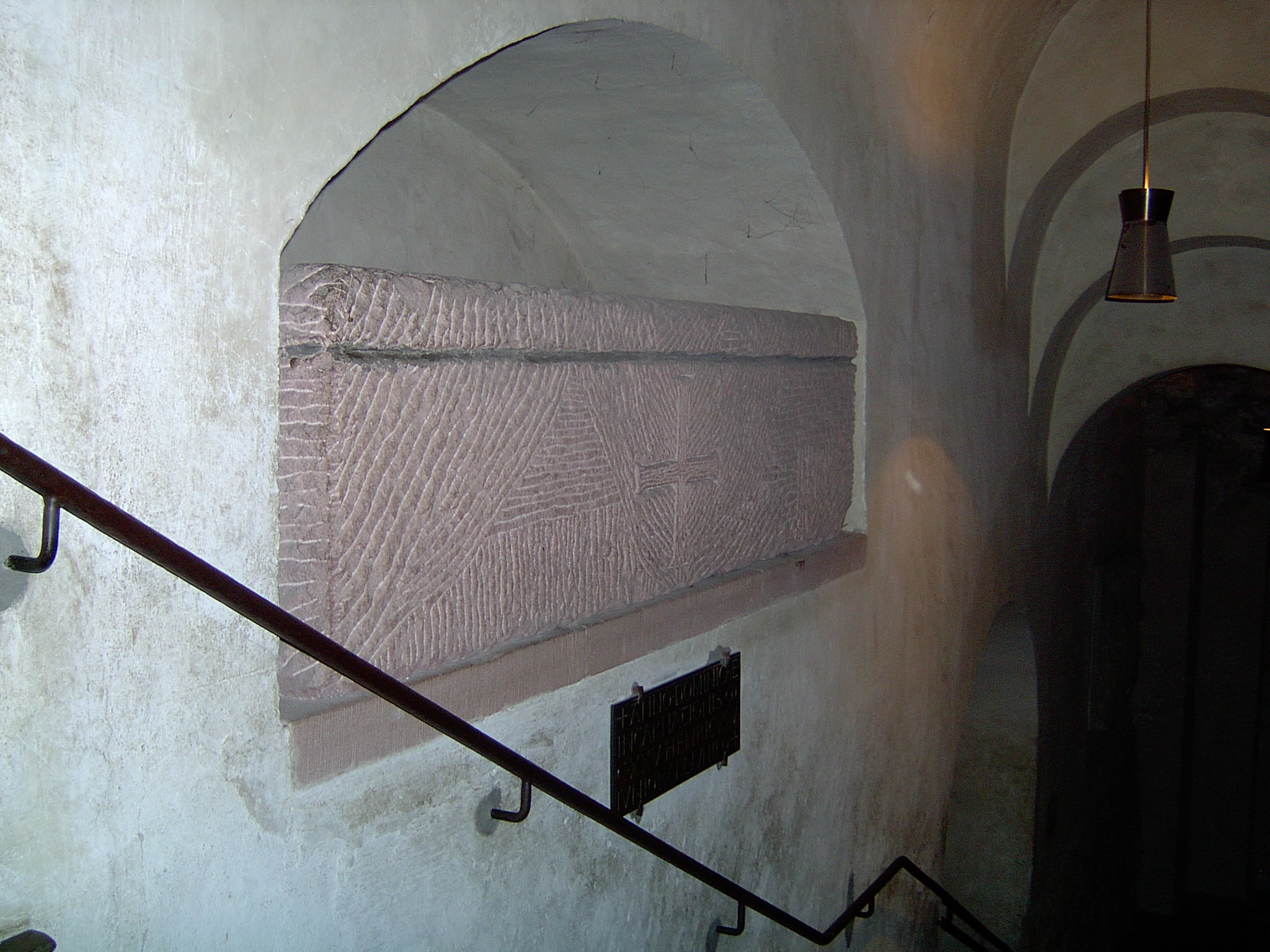
Grave of Henry V in the cathedral of Speyer.

Archbishop Adalbert, advisor of the last Salian emperor Henry V, came into opposition to him during the Investiture Controversy by 1112 at the latest and made contact with the Saxon dukes who were opponents of Henry. Adalbert was imprisoned for three years and then continued his opposition to Henry V until he was compensated by the Emperor in the Concordat of Worms in 1122. Lothair remained an open enemy of the Salians and the Staufens.

Henry V died on 23 May 1125. His will left his personal property to his nephew Duke Frederick II von Staufen of Swabia, but placed the Imperial regalia in the care of his wife Empress Matilda at Trifels Castle until an imperial election could be held. As Archchancellor and highest-ranking prince of the Empire, Archbishop Adalbert I was in charge of preparing and presiding over the election. At Henry's funeral, which probably took place in Speyer in June, the anti-Salian attitude of Adalbert became clear. He desired a free election in which Duke Frederick II's succession would not be a foregone conclusion. Otto von Freising and Ordericus Vitalis report that Adalbert took the Imperial regalia from Matilda in preparation for the Imperial election.

== Candidates ==
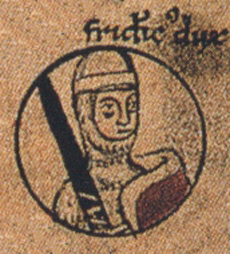
Image of Frederick in the Chronica sancti Pantaleonis

The electoral system chosen by Adalbert was a recent innovation, first used in the election of the Abbot of Zwiefalten Abbey in 1095, which was called the Electio per compromissum (Election through compromise), in which there would be ten candidates from each of the provinces of Bavaria, Swabia, Franconia, and Saxony and they would all have to reach an agreement on a single candidate. The forty electors obviously could not agree, but three candidates were put forward:

- Frederick II, Duke of Swabia,
- Lothair III, Duke of Saxony, and
- Leopold III, Margrave of Austria

Otto von Freising records a fourth candidate, Charles I, Count of Flanders, who rejected the offer.

Frederick, as nephew, supporter and personal heir of the last Salian emperor could claim the strongest right to the throne and was considered the favourite. But the powerful Duke Lothair had significant support, as a long-term opponent of the Salian emperors' hostile policy toward the spiritual princes of the empire. Leopold of Austria was also linked to the Salian dynasty, since his wife Agnes of Waiblingen was a daughter of Henry IV, and he enjoyed the support of the southern German clergy.

== Course of the election ==
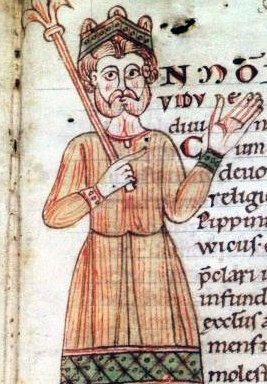
Portrait of Lothair in the Codex Eberhardi, Fulda monastery 1150/60

Frederick, who was encamped outside the city of Mainz, did not immediately appear at the electoral assembly. After the three candidates had been named, Adalbert went to Lothair and Leopold to ask if either of them was willing to recognise one of the other candidates as king. Both agreed and simultaneously announced their renunciation of their candidature. In this way, they showed their humility and demonstrated that they were worthy of being elected as king. According to the Narratio, Frederick believed that as a result of this announcement by the other two candidates, he was the only candidate remaining. The following day he entered the city victoriously, expecting to be elected by the assembled princes.

After Frederick's arrival, Adalbert repeated the question he had asked the previous day to each candidate, but when he came to Frederick he also asked whether he was willing to renounce the designation of a successor in order to enable free elections in future. Frederick left this question unanswered and went back to his camp to consult with his associates, thereby resigning as a candidate.

Subsequently, Lothair's followers riotously proclaimed him king and called on the inhabitants of the city who were assembled outside to celebrate the new king. Although many of the Bavarian princes protested at the elevation of Lothair to the kingship without an election and were demanding that an actual vote take place, Adalbert barred the doors to prevent the people of Mainz from acclaiming Lothair and to prevent the Bavarian princes from holding the vote. Then one of the Papal legates in attendance called for quiet and the Bavarian bishops declared that they could not reach a decision without Henry the Black, their Duke, who had left the assembly at the same time as Frederick II.

Perhaps three days later, the electors gathered once more and Lothair was elected king by the princes, including Henry the Black, who was present this time. The princes then performed homage to the new king. Frederick II finally did homage two days later and Archbishop Frederick of Cologne crowned Lothair in Aachen on 13 September. Conflict had already broken out between the king and Frederick II by the end of the year.

== Bibliography ==
=== Primary ===
- Narratio de electione Lotharii Saxoniae ducis in regem Romanorum, edited by Wilhelm Wattenbach, MGH. SS XII, Hannover 1856, pp. 509–512. Online (accessed on 13 April 2017)
- Ordericus Vitalis, The Ecclesiastical History of Orderic Vitalis. Books XI, XII and XIII, edited by Marjorie Chibnall, Oxford 1978, pp. 360–367.
- Otto von Freising, Gesta Frederici seu rectius cronica / Die Taten Friedrichs oder richtiger Cronica, edited by Franz-Josef Schmale, 2nd edition, Darmstadt 1965, pp. 156–159.
- Registers and other sources on the election: RI IV,1,1 n. 92, in Regesta Imperii Online (accessed on 12 March 2013)

=== Secondary ===
- Hermann Kalbfuß, "Zur Entstehung der »Narratio de electione Lotharii«," Mitteilungen des Instituts für österreichische Geschichtsforschung 31 (1910), pp. 538–557.
- Ulrich Nonn, "Geblütsrecht, Wahlrecht, Königswahl: Die Wahl Lothars von Supplinburg 1125," Geschichte in Wissenschaft und Unterricht 44 (1993), pp. 146–157.
- Ulrich Schmidt, Königswahl und Thronfolge im 12. Jahrhundert, Köln/Wien 1987, ISBN 3-412-04087-8.
- Bernd Schneidmüller, "1125 – Unruhe als politische Kraft im mittelalterlichen Reich," in Staufer & Welfen. Zwei rivalisierende Dynastien im Hochmittelalter, edited by Werner Hechberger, Regensburg 2009, pp. 30–49, ISBN 978-3-7917-2168-2.
- Heinz Stoob, Zur Königswahl Lothars von Sachsen im Jahre 1125, in: Historische Forschungen für Walter Schlesinger, edited by Helmut Beumann, Köln/Wien 1974, pp. 438–461, ISBN 3-412-10474-4.
- Ludwig Vones, "Der gescheiterte Königsmacher. Erzbischof Adalbert I. von Mainz und die Wahl von 1125," Historisches Jahrbuch 115 (1995), pp. 85–124, ISSN 0018-2621.
