= Immed IV of Hamaland =

Immed IV of Hamaland (also known as Immed of Kleef) (ca. 950-983) Count of Utrech and Renkum, was the first husband of Adela of Hamaland.

There is not much known about him. According to some he was the oldest son of Count Immed III of the family of the Immedingen and his wife Gisela (Keila).

== Wives and children ==
From the marriage with Adela of Hamaland he had the following children:

- Diederik from Hamaland, born 973
- Meinwerk, bishop of Paderborn, born 975
- Azela Immedinger
- Glismod, husband from Adalbert, Margrave of Austria, born 975
- Emma of Lesum, born 974
