= Balderic, Count of Upladium =

Count of the Holy Roman empire

Count Balderic of Upladium (died 5 June 1021) was a Rhineland count in the Holy Roman Empire, who held various estates stretching from the forest region of Drenthe in the north, to the area near Cologne, on both sides of the river Rhine.

Balderic and his wife Adela of Hamaland were heavily involved in feuds among the nobility in the region where the rivers Rhine and Maas converge, near the present day border of the Netherlands and Germany. At first he fought against Adela in the feud between her and her sister, Liutgard of Elten, perhaps as Luitgard's vassal. Together with Godizo son of Richizo, a relative of the sisters, he successfully destroyed Adela's fort. By 996, Liutgard was dead, and he had become the second husband of Countess Adela.

In the context of the bigger feuds which affected much of the Holy Roman Empire during the reign of Henry II, Balderic was a political ally of Gerhard of the Moselle, Count of Metz, and Count Reginar III, who was fighting to establish himself as a count near the region of Pagus of Brabant. This group were allies of the rebellious Luxembourg branch of the House of Ardenne, and also supported by Heribert the Bishop of Cologne.

== Ancestry and the Gennep prefecture ==
Alpertus of Metz, one of the main sources for the life events of Count Balderic, noted that "according to some people" Balderic, although he had noble status, was not of an equal background to his wife.

It is difficult to be certain which lands associated with him were those of his own inheritance, and which were possessions of his wife. Bas Aarts has proposed that his maternal family were established in the area near Xanten, and in the area which later became the County of Cleves. In a document made after the deaths of Balderic and Adela listing grants made to Deutz near Cologne, he is described as "Baldericus comes de Oplathe vel Houberch", "count of Upladium, also known as Houberg". This may mean that his most well-known fort (probably at Montferland) near Elten, was from his own inheritance and not Adela's. Balderic, with permission from Adela, also founded a collegiate church at Zyfflich, where he would later be buried.

Alpertus described both Balderic and his rival in the region, Wichmann of Vreden, as two very rich "Germani" from around the Rhine. (The term Germanus was being used geographically, referring to north of the Rhine, in the eastern Frankish kingdom, in contrast to "Gaul", south of the Rhine, meaning Lotharingia.) Wichmann of Vreden married Balderic's cousin, the daughter of his uncle, the prefect Godfrey, and gained control over dowry lands in "Gaul", while Balderic, through his marriage to Adela, gained lands in Germania. However, Wichmann's lands in Lotharingia ("Gaul") remained significantly less than Balderic's, and he saw this as a limit upon his ambitions.

Count Balderic's mother was apparently named Gerberga. The oldest Xanten necrologia mentioned the death of a Gerburg who was mother of Count Balderic ("mater Baldrici comitis").

Balderic's uncle's name was Godfried and he held the prefecture (prefectus) which Balderic eventually managed to attain. It is not clear if Godfried was a paternal or maternal uncle, although the Latin term, avunculus, implies a maternal uncle. The prefectship was a position which involved organizing defence against Viking raids in the river delta, and holding a fort at Gennep, on the river Maas. Alpertus described how Balderic played a prominent role in managing such a defence during an invasion in 1006, when his uncle was elderly.

== Hunting rights in Drenthe and Antwerp ==
In 1006 Emperor Henry II granted Ansfried, his long-time loyal sword-bearer, who he had assigned to be Bishop of Utrecht, hunting rights in Drenthe in the county of a Count Balderic.

In 1008 the same emperor made a grant to both Bishop Balderic II of Liège, a newly assigned imperial bishop, and Count Balderic, of hunting rights in the forest of Waverwald, in the area of the Nete and Dyle rivers, between Antwerp and Leuven, in what was described as the county of Count Gotizo known as "Antwerf". This area is now in Belgium. Antwerp was one of several imperial Margraviates (frontier counties) established along the Schelde river, confronting the Flemish margraves in the kingdom of France.

The two charters appear to reflect a bigger royal strategy, although the details are no longer clear. Historian Jan Dhondt noted that both bishops were in effect receiving hunting rights near their new residences, and suggested the two transactions are part of an exchange, possibly involuntarily, and probably also connected to the establishment of the Margraviate of Antwerp using possessions which previously belonged to Ansfried. Count Balderic, on the other hand, had previously held the Drenthe hunting rights, and was being compensated by lands far to the south.

That Ansfried had lands near Waverwald is shown by other records. He granted several estates in the same region, in this case described as the county of "Rien", to the church of Saints Maria and Martin in Utrecht. Before becoming bishop in 995, according to Alpertus of Metz Ansfried had been involved in struggles against Count Lambert whose lordship of Leuven was just to the south of Waverwald. Alpertus praised Count Ansfried, who became bishop of Utrecht in 995, saying he had often defeated Lambert's bandits in Brabant, who often hid in forests.

Bas Aarts interprets the Antwerp charter to say that the two Balderics were receiving rights in a forest which they already owned. Such a grant shared by two recipients would be typical in a case where they were coheirs of a recent owner, and thus the two Balderics are likely to be closely related to each other. This idea is at least as old as Léon Vanderkindere's 1902 work.

== Conflicts ==
After the death of the prefect Godfrey, Balderic's uncle, Wichmann dominated Godfrey's incompetent son, and looked set to take control of the prefecture. Wichmann also began to make allies south of the Rhine and develop plans. Wichmann built a fort on the Meuse river south of the Rhine, probably at Boxmeer. In response, Balderic called upon his companions (clientes) Gerhard of the Moselle, who he described as Balderic's best friend, and Count Lambert of Leuven, to help besiege the new fortification. They succeeded. As the situation escalated Alpertus wrote that Gerhard and Lambert "said that they would endure travails and dangers" because "these two men were always prepared to stir up any kind of commotion or rebellion". However, Alpertus had more respect for other supporters of this clique during this dispute: Heribert the Bishop of Cologne; Adalbold II bishop of Utrecht; and the emperor Henry II himself (Gerhard's brother-in-law) also supposedly gave them considerable grace.

After this, Bishop Adalbold was attacked by Godizo the son of Richizo, now an ally of Wichmann, while he was travelling to see the emperor, and horses were stolen. Adalbold and Balderic joined forces to besiege Godizo at his fort of Aspel, at Rees, now in Germany, but eventually withdrew hoping that Godizo would act more reasonably. These events put Adalbold in a more favourable mood towards Balderic.

Adela pushed Balderic to claim his late uncle Godfrey's old prefecture from the king. Adela found it unbearable that the "Saxon", Wichmann of Vrede, might become Balderic's equal, and a closer neighbour. She said he could argue this not only based on his closer relationship to his uncle, but also based upon his ancestry generally. Balderic's appeal to the king was successful, and he then moved rapidly to expel his cousin's men from the fort in Gennep, pleasing the common people, but annoying the neighbouring nobles and even members of Balderic's own household. In reaction Wichmann made successful efforts to become friendly with Bishop Adalbold, who had been supporting Balderic. Adalbold called the two men to try to make peace. Balderic argued that this was difficult because Wichmann had only recently attacked his sister's residence, and killed people. In reply Wichmann argued that Balderic's sister's sons, before they were even adults, had once attacked the old prefect Godfrey while he was travelling. Balderic was forced to make peace. On the day after this agreement however, Wichmann's men made a surprise attack on Balderic and his men.

In 1015 Godizo the son of Richizo died and Count Gerhard, who was his relative, was given control of the forts of Heimbach and Aspel (now both in Germany) to protect the interests of the widow and daughters. He granted Aspel to his ally Balderic. However, the widow married Gebhard, who had been a soldier of Balderic, placing Gebhard in control of the two forts, and in direct conflict with his old lord Balderic. Gebhard gave up that friendship and subjected himself to Wichmann's command.

Later, the emperor called Bishop Adalbold, Duke Godfried and Count Wichmann, to go to take an army to Brabant, apparently against Count Lambert. This may have been the occasion upon which Lambert was killed, 12 September 1015. They did not want Balderic to go because of his alliance to the trouble-maker. While this was happening, Balderic asked Count Gerhard to capture the fort of Heimbach, which he did. However, at a similar time, Gebhard was able to capture Balderic while he was travelling to Cologne. He treated him badly, partly cutting his beard off, and took him to Wichmann's fort at Monterberg. Balderic was held to ransom and forced to give up his claim on Aspel.

According to Dietmar of Merseburg, Balderic was present and on the losing side, when his ally Gerhard was defeated by Duke Godfrey the childless, 27 August 1017.

== Downfall ==
According to Alpertus, not long after giving up his claim on Aspel and being released, Balderic and Wichmann made peace. Balderic was entertained by Wichmann, and then Wichmann was invited to a feast by Balderic. After three days, while leading him home, Wichmann was killed by one of Balderic's men, who, according to Alpertus, had promised Adela to do so, without Balderic's knowledge. As a result of outrage at this murder, Bishop Adalbold became Balderic's outspoken opponent, and bishop Heribert in Cologne offered no assistance. Adalbold and the neighbours of Balderic, and friends of Wichmann, declared his goods forfeit and quickly began a siege, leaving Balderic and Adela at a disadvantage. They dressed women as male soldiers to man the ramparts. When the emperor himself was approaching with more forces, Balderic negotiated his defeat with Adalbold and Duke Berhard of Saxony, allowing Adela to leave with her property, but they destroyed the fort.

After Balderic lost his fort of Upladium, Gerhard and Heribert the bishop of Cologne helped Balderic. In 1017, an out-of-favour servant of Balderic managed to capture Wichmann's old fort of Monterberg (near Cleves), then under the guardianship of Bernhard II, Duke of Saxony. Dietmar names the servant as his own first cousin Berthold, a younger son of Liuthar, Margrave of the Saxon North March. This capture gave hope to Balderic but the emperor ordered the fort to be destroyed, and Gerhard was one of the people asked to ensure that this took place.

At the subsequent assembly called by the emperor, about 1018, Balderic was not given a chance to defend himself by his two enemies Duke Godfried, and Duke Bernhard. The emperor and the bishop of Cologne ensured that he returned to Cologne safely. Also in 1018, Duke Godfrey and Count Gerhard were forced to make peace by the emperor, and Balderic made peace with the emperor.

Three years later, Balderic died 5 June 1021 at Heimbach, and was buried at Zyfflich.

Later, Count Gerhard arranged for the same servant to trap Gebhard, promising to get him into the fort of Heimbach, where Gerhard, who was waiting for him, was able to kill him, avenging the death of Balderic.

The lands which fell to the crown after his death were listed in a charter of 1025. The lands listed in this "county" (comitatus) are in the areas of Veluwe and Zutphen north of the Rhine:

- Hummila 8 manses, Hummelo
- Angarlo 2 manses, Angerlo near Doesburg
- Fordhusen 14 manses
- Diedehun 5 manses, Didam
- Elisa 10 manses
- Swella 1.5 manses
- In the pagus called Felewu, at Merclede 1 manse, perhaps Markluiden
- Tungren 1 manse, Tongeren by Epe
- Dusburg 1 manse, Doesburg
- Diederna 2 manses, Dieren on the Ijssel
- Hecra 1 manse, perhaps Heeckeren stond in Steenderen
- Sorna 1 manse, Laag Soeren or High Soeren
- Hecheim 2 manses, perhaps Hattem
- Dule 3 manses
- Dornspic 3 manses, Doornspijk
- Helberga 3 manses, perhaps Elburg or Helbergen by Zutphen
- Forste 2 manses, Voorst near Zutphen
- Asawon 2 manses, Aaswijn near Zeddam
- Eltna 1 manse, Elten
- Lopena 2 manses
- Westervurd 2 manses, Westervoort on the Ijssel

== Bibliography ==
Medieval works

- Alpertus of Metz, De diversitate temporum:

- Latin MGH edition: Alpertus of Metz (1841), Pertz (ed.), De diversitate temporum, MGH Scriptores, vol. 4
- Dutch translation: Alpertus of Metz (1999), Gebeurtenissen van deze tijd, translated by van Rij, Hilversum
- English translation: Alpertus of Metz (2012), Warfare and Politics in Medieval Germany, ca. 1000. On the Variety of Our Times, translated by Bachrach, David S.

- Dietmar (Thietmar) of Merseburg, Chronicon:

- Older Latin MGH edition: Thietmar of Merseburg, Lappenberg (ed.), Chronicon, MGH Scriptores, vol. 3, p. 851
- Newer Latin MGH edition: Holtsmann, ed. (1935), Chronicon, MGH SS rer. Germ. N. S., vol. 9
- English translation: Ottonian Germany. The Chronicon of Thietmar of Merseburg, translated by Warner, David A., Manchester, 2001
- German translation: R. Holtzmann, Die Chronik des Bischofs Thietmar von Merseburg und ihre Korveier Überarbeitung reproduced by Trillmich in 1957.
