= Adela of Hamaland =

- Spouses: Immed IV of Hamaland; Balderic, Count of Upladium
- Parents: Count Wichman II of Hamaland and Liutgard of Flanders

Adela of Hamaland (also known as Adela of Elten) (c. 952 – died after 1021) was Countess of Hamaland in what is now the Netherlands in about 973–1021. She was the regent of Renkum in circa 983–?, likely as regent for her minor son Dirk of Renkum. She firstly married Count Immed IV of Hamaland (d. 983), the father of her son, and later Count Balderik of Hamaland, whom she made her co-regent by marriage.

== Life ==
Adela was the daughter of Count Wichman II of Hamaland (d. 973) and Liutgard of Flanders (d. 962), daughter of Arnulf of Flanders and Adele of Vermandois. Adela was the younger sister of Liutgard (d. 995), who became the abbess of Elten Abbey, which was founded by their father. They had a brother, Wichman, who died at a young age.

Adela's first husband was Count Immed of Renkum, a member of the Immedinger dynasty who is reputed to have come from Cologne, with whom she had five children.

=== Succession war ===
At the death of their father in 973, the emperor made Elten Abbey a Princely Imperial Abbey and Liutgard was thereby given sovereign status as princess abbess of Elten. A succession war erupted between the sisters, as Adela claimed the county as sovereign Countess of Hamaland in inheritance from her father while Liutgard claimed all the county as Elten territory. Liutgard had her vassal Balderich attack and burn Adela's fortress down. The conflict with her sister lasted from 973 until 996.

In 983, Adela became a widow and regent of the county of Renkum as guardian of her minor son Dirk of Renkum. She had coins minted with the inscription Adala cometissa. She occupied the territory of Liutgard, but was forced by the emperor to end the occupation.

=== Later life ===
Upon the death of Liutgard in 995, Adela married her sister's former vassal Balderik, and he ruled as Count of Hamaland by marriage. One year later, the succession dispute between Adela and Elten was finally resolved by mediation of the Otto III, Holy Roman Emperor: the territory formally named county of Hamaland was split between Elten Abbey and Adela of Hamaland, and Adela's spouse Balderik was formally named the successor of her father. In 999, Adela and Balderik conquered the land given to Elten as well.

By their contemporaries, Balderik was regarded merely as the tool of Adela, and when his rival Wichman van Vreden was murdered in 1016, she, rather than Balderik, was blamed. The followers of Wichman laid siege to Adela's fortress, Uplade, where Balderik left her and escaped, leaving her to defend the fortress herself. Adela did not have enough soldiers, and therefore dressed women as soldiers and used them in her defense as well. The fortress was eventually captured by the enemy, but Adela was allowed to leave unharmed.

== Children ==
With Immed, Adela had the following children:

- Meinwerk, bishop of Paderborn
- Dirk/Theoderic (d.1014)
- Glismod (d.before 1041)
- Adela (d. after 1027), a canoness at Elten Abbey
- Emma of Lesum (d. 1038), married Liutger, son of the Saxon Margrave, Hermann Billung

== Legacy ==
Adela has traditionally been given an infamous reputation in history. Contemporaries reviled her as a “treacherous wife” (perfida coniunx); a “second Salome” (secunda Herodiadis); and as acting like Jezebel (et sicut Hiezabel). Benedictine chronicler Alpertus of Metz described her as a female Cain. The medieval historian Karl Leyser called Adela "the Lady Macbeth of the Lower Rhine."

Adela is the subject of the novel De valse dageraad (2001, ISBN 9789035122895) by Jan van Aken. She is also the protagonist of the novel A Daughter Scorned: The story of Adela of Hamaland by Anna Chant (2024).

== Bibliography ==
- Annales Quedliburgenses, ed., M. Giese, MGH SS rer Germ 72 (Hannover, 2004).
- Thietmar of Merseburg, Chronicon, in R. Holtzmann, ed., MGH Scriptores rerum Germanicarum NS 9 (Berlin, 1935)
- Alpert of Metz, De diversitate temporum libri duo, ed. G. Pertz, M.G.H., Scriptores, 4 (Hanover, 1841).
- Vita Meinwerci episcopi Patherbrunnensis, ed, F. Tenckhoff, M.G.H., Scriptores rer. Germ. in us. schol. 59 (Hanover, 1921).
- K. Leyser, Communications and Power in the middle ages. Volume I: The Carolingian and Ottonian centuries, ed. T. Reuter (London, 1994).
- R. le Jan, ‘La vengeance d'Adèle ou la construction d'une légende noire,’ in La vengeance 400-1200, ed. D. Barthélemy, F. Bougard and R. le Jan (Rome, 2006), pp. 325–340.
- F. W. Oediger, 'Adelas Kampf um Elten (996-1002),' Annalen des historischen Vereins für den Niederrheins, 155-156 (1954), 67-86.
- J. M. van Winter, 'Die Hamaländer Grafen als Angehörige der Reichsaristokratie im 10. Jahrhundert,' Rheinische Vierteljahrsblätter, 44 (1980), 16-46
