= Formbach =

River in Germany

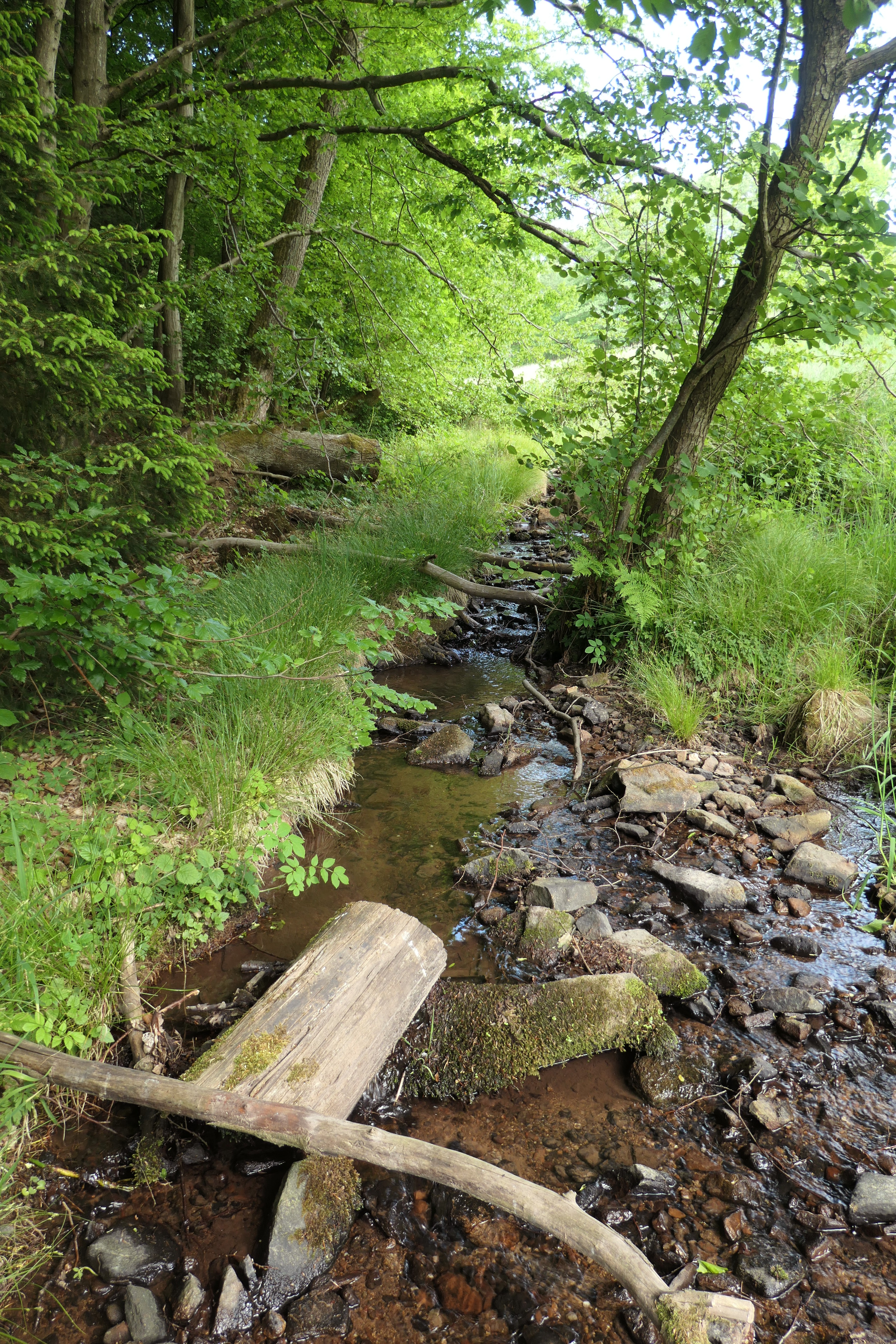

Location
- Country: Germany
- State: Hesse

Physical characteristics
- Mouth
  - location: Osterbach
  - coordinates: 49.6979°N 8.8623°E

Basin features
- Progression: Osterbach→ Gersprenz→ Main→ Rhine→ North Sea

Formbach is a small river of Hesse, Germany. It flows into the Osterbach near Unter-Ostern.

== See also ==
- List of rivers of Hesse
