= Matfriede =

The Matfriede or Matfriedinger, both of which are German terms, is a Frankish noble family of the 9th-11th centuries, or possibly several families who used similar names, that has been proposed by modern historians.

The name of the family is based on the observation that the name Matfried was used by repeatedly by members of this family. However the exact connections between these possible relatives can't for the most part be confirmed by direct evidence.

== The elder Matfriede ==
The first person proposed in this family is Matfried I, a count of Orleans in the time of Louis the Pious. He appears to have had a son also named Matfried.

== Counts of Metz ==
Adalhard, the ancestor of the second line of Matfrieds, possibly married a daughter or niece of this second Matfried.

Counts of Metz and ancestors of the Dukes of Lorraine.

Adalhard of Metz; Count of Metz
Henry the Fowler; King of Germany	Oda	Gerhard; Count of Metz	Richer/Richar (d.945); Abbot of Prüm, Bishop of Liège	Matfried; Count of Metz
"Ottonian dynasty"	Wigfried; Archbishop of Cologne	Godfrid; Count Palantine of Lotharingia	Adalbert (d.944); Count of Metz	Bishop Bernoin of Verdun
Godfrid; Duke of Lower Lotharingia	Gebhard; Possibly father of...	Gerhard, Count of Metz; Possibly father of...	Adalhard; Possibly father of...
Count Sigfried founder of Luxembourg	Richard? Count of Metz? Possibly father of...
Henry II, Holy Roman Emperor	Cunigunde of Luxembourg	Eva of Luxembourg	Gerhard Mosellensis; Count of Metz	Adalbert II; Count in Saargau and Count of Metz	Adelaide of Metz
Sigfried died young	Berscinda abbess	Conrad II, Holy Roman Emperor
Kuno; Count of Rheinfelden	Ida of Lorraine	Gerhard; Count of Metz	"Salian dynasty"
Rudolf; Duke of Swabia; Antiking of Germany	"Habsburg dynasty"	Adalbert; Duke of Lorraine

== See also ==
- County of Metz
