= Lothair III, Holy Roman Emperor =

Holy Roman Emperor from 1133 to 1137

Lothair III
- Imperator Romanorum
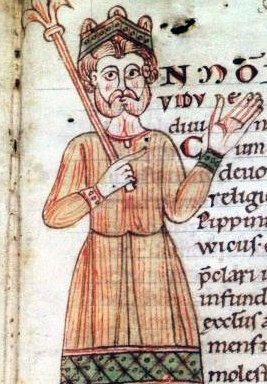
- Portrait of Emperor Lothair III

Holy Roman Emperor
- Reign: 1133–1137
- Coronation: 4 June 1133, Rome
- Predecessor: Henry V
- Successor: Frederick I

King of the Romans King of Germany, Burgundy, and Italy
- Reign: 1125–1137
- Coronation: 13 September 1125, Aachen (Germany)
- Predecessor: Henry V
- Successor: Conrad III
- Born: c. June 1075; Lutterloh, Duchy of Saxony
- Died: 4 December 1137 (aged 62); Breitenwang, Tyrol, Duchy of Bavaria
- Burial: Königslutter
- Spouse: Richenza of Northeim (m. 1107)
- Issue: Gertrude, Duchess of Bavaria
- House: Supplinburg
- Father: Gebhard of Supplinburg
- Mother: Hedwig of Formbach

Lothair III, sometimes numbered Lothair II (Note: He was the second emperor named Lothair, but is numbered "Lothair III" by those who count as his predecessor Lothair II of Lotharingia, most of whose kingdom became a part of Germany. Other sources number him "Lothair III" because he was the third Lothair to rule Italy after King Lothair II of Italy (both "Lothair II"'s are numbered after Emperor Lothair I). Lothair occasionally called himself "the third" in his diplomas (Lotharius tertius), and was the first German ruler to abandon any distinction in numbering between his rule as king and his rule as emperor, a practice continued by his successors.) and also known as Lothair of Supplinburg (c. June 1075 – 4 December 1137), was Holy Roman Emperor from 1133 until his death. He was appointed Duke of Saxony in 1106 and elected King of Germany in 1125 before being crowned emperor in Rome. The son of the Saxon count Gebhard of Supplinburg, his reign was troubled by the constant intriguing of the Hohenstaufens, Duke Frederick II of Swabia and Duke Conrad of Franconia. He died while returning from a successful campaign against the Norman Kingdom of Sicily.

== Rise to power ==
In 1013, a certain Saxon nobleman named Liutger was mentioned as a count in or of the Harzgau subdivision of Eastphalia. His grandson Count Gebhard, father of Emperor Lothair, possibly acquired the castle of Süpplingenburg about 1060 via his marriage with Hedwig, a daughter of the Bavarian count Frederick of Formbach and his wife Gertrud, herself a descendant of the Saxon margrave Dietrich of Haldensleben who secondly married the Billung duke Ordulf of Saxony upon Count Frederick's death.

Little is known of Lothair's youth. His name first appears in the contemporary records in 1088. His father Gebhard of Supplinburg joined the Saxon rebellion against the ruling Salian dynasty and died on 9 June 1075 in the Battle of Langensalza, fighting troops loyal to emperor Henry IV. Shortly after Gebhard's death Lothair was born at Unterlüß. In 1107 he married Richenza, daughter of Count Henry of Northeim and Gertrude of Brunswick, heiress of the Brunonids.

Lothair's land purchases, inheritance and marriage alliances among the Saxon nobles, resulted in the acquisition of the domains of the House of Billung and the Counts of Northeim. The marriage with Richenza of the Brunonids in particular, made him the wealthiest nobleman among his fellow Saxons. He supported future emperor Henry V during his 1104 rebellion against his father Henry IV, and the ensuing disempowerment campaign, that culminated in the abdication of the emperor on December 31, 1105, and his son's coronation a few days later. For his loyalty Lothair was rewarded with the fief of title and estate of the Duchy of Saxony upon the death of duke Magnus of Billung, who had died without an heir in 1106. Emboldened by the promotion and incensed over the king's increasingly autocratic rule, such as the wanton imposition of a new tax on ducal lords, Duke Lothair joined the growing opposition party to Henry. He acted autonomously by vesting Count Adolf of Schauenburg with the newly established County of Holstein in 1111. Lothair was temporarily deposed in 1112, when Henry transferred the ducal title to Otto of Ballenstedt. He was soon reinstated when count Otto fell into disgrace and he tactically submitted himself to Henry V. In 1115 however, he took command of the rebellious Saxon forces and defeated the emperor in the Battle of Welfesholz. Henry completely lost control over the administration and the revenue of Saxony. When in 1123 Henry V vested Count Wiprecht of Groitzsch with the Margraviate of Meissen, Lothair enforced the appointment of Conrad of Wettin and ceded the March of Lusatia to Count Albert the Bear.

== Reign ==
Upon Emperor Henry V's death in 1125, Archchancellor Adalbert summoned the royal electoral assembly in Mainz. On August 24 the electors declined the candidacy of the primary contender Duke Frederick of Hohenstaufen, who destroyed his chances due to his appalling overconfidence (ambicone cecatus) and his refusal to accept free princely elections (libera electio). Adalbert of Mainz considered Lothair to be a suitable candidate. Although the most powerful territorial prince in Saxony, he was of advanced age (slightly over fifty years of age) and had no male heir, not the ideal prerequisites for a long dynastic line of kings. He was elected King of Germany and asserted himself against Leopold III of Austria and Charles the Good. His election was notable in that it marked a departure from the concept of hereditary succession as the electors preferred a sovereign with moderate powers after the Salian era of oppressio. Somewhat naive concerning the complex power struggle between the papacy and the empire, Lothair also consented to several symbolic acts that were subsequently interpreted by the Roman Curia as signaling acceptance of papal confirmation of his position.

Duke Vladislaus I of Bohemia died in 1125. The succession was disputed among his surviving brother Soběslav I and his Moravian cousin Otto the Black, who was supported by Vladislaus' widow Richeza of Berg. In late 1125 Lothair joined Otto's side, who had advanced large sums of money.

A military campaign against Soběslav was launched and in February 1126 Lothair's force entered Bohemian territory and was promptly defeated at the Battle of Chlumec. Soběslav captured high-ranking nobles, like Albert the Bear and Louis I of Thuringia. However, Soběslav immediately went to meet Lothair at his camp and formally requested and received the fief of Bohemia. Peace was restored, prisoners set free and although the winner of the battle had submitted himself to the losing side, he secured full legitimacy and lasting prestige.

=== Dispute with the Staufers ===
Having both Saxon and Bavarian ancestry, the Supplinburg dynasty was a political opponent of the Salian dynasty and the House of Hohenstaufen. Disputes arose with Duke Frederick II when he refused to hand over property to Lothair, which the king considered to be royal property, the Staufer on the other hand argued, that it belonged to the Salian heritage. The contentious assets had long been administered together with other Salian domestic estates, their origin was hard to determine and difficult to separate. Lothair advocated the principle that all of the assets in question had now become imperial properties due to the extinction of the Salian dynasty. The first armed engagements between Lothair and the Staufer took place as early as 1125 and increased in the years that followed. Lothair, with the approval obtained at a meeting of the princes in Regensburg, attempted to seize the crown lands, which provoked a Staufer reaction. Lothair then isolated Frederick II as he placed him under Imperial ban and withdrew the Franconian ducal fief from Conrad.

After Lothair's 1127 campaign against the Staufers had collapsed at the gates of Nuremberg, the Swabians and the Franconians declared Frederick's younger brother Conrad anti-king Conrad III. Looking for support of his kingship, in 1128 Conrad went to Italy, where he was crowned King of Italy by Anselm V, Archbishop of Milan. Lothair took advantage of Conrad's absence and weak position and resumed his attacks on the Staufers and in 1129 conquered the Staufer cities Nuremberg and Speyer. Conrad, on the other hand failed to acquire the desired assistance in Italy, and having made no political progress, returned in 1130, which assured at least a partial victory for Lothair.

Lastly Lothair, in order to prevent the loss of Burgundy to a power hostile to the empire, appointed his loyal ally Conrad I, Duke of Zähringen as Rector of the Principatus Burgundiaey.

=== Domestic policies in the Northeast ===
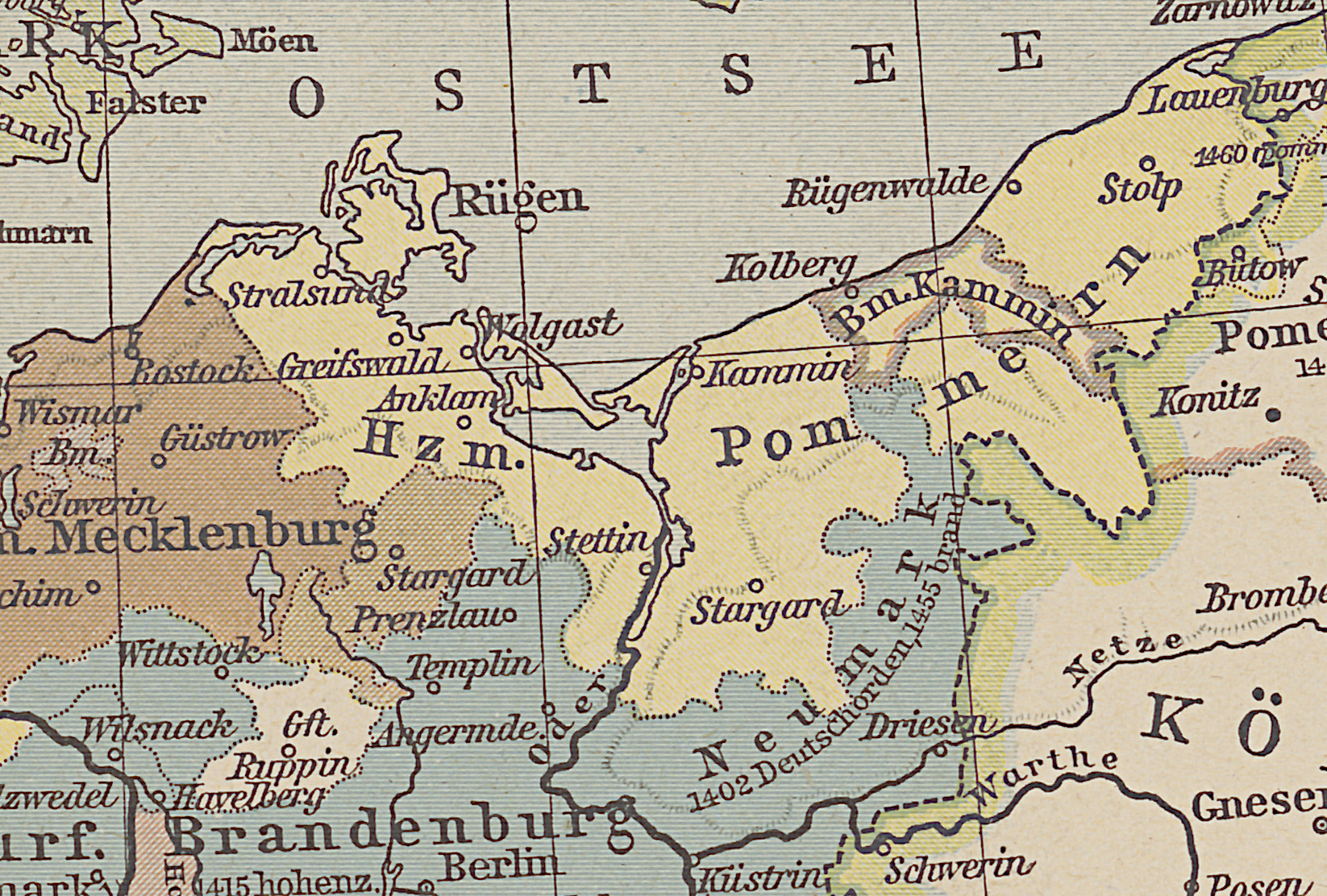
The Duchy of Pomerania, 1477

Emperor Lothair's policies and actions in the northern and eastern estates of the kingdom would have the longest-lasting impacts. As a Saxon by birth, he was certainly more focused on that region than previous and future monarchs. He already pursued active territorial policies before his royal tenure as early as 1111, when he installed count Adolf of Schauenburg in Holstein and Stormarn. In an act of royal consolidation policy Lothair established the Landgraviate of Thuringia, that encompassed the remaining and predominantly non-contiguous estates of the ill-fated former Merovingian Duchy of Thuringia. The brutal conquest of the old Thuringii kingdom under king Chlothar I had left the area devastated. Subsequently the Franks desired to rule the acquisition, which proved to be only partly successful, as a long process of depopulation and recurring population replacement by Franconians, Bavarians and Christianized Slavs followed. The 1129 appointment of Herman of Winzenburg to the comital office was a failure, as he allegedly was deposed a year later on charges of breach of the peace. The sources, however provide conflicting dates. The 1131 investiture of Louis marked the beginning of smooth Ludowingian rule for more than a century.

In 1134 Lothair appointed the Ascanian Albert the Bear as Margrave of Brandenburg and in 1136 Conrad the Great of Wettin, already margrave of Meissen, for the office of the Margraviate of Lusatia, thereby uniting the two marches. In addition, he petitioned the pope to grant more executive rights for the Archbishoprics of Bremen and Magdeburg. King Eric II of Denmark was made an imperial prince of the emperor in 1135, and member of the Reichstag. Lothair's diplomatic missions to the warring parties of Poland and Bohemia/Hungary were successful and resulted in overdue tribute payment by the Polish Duke Bolesław III Wrymouth for the 1121 established Duchy of Pomerania, which in addition to the island of Rügen was eventually secured as a fief of the Empire.

=== Relations with the Papacy ===
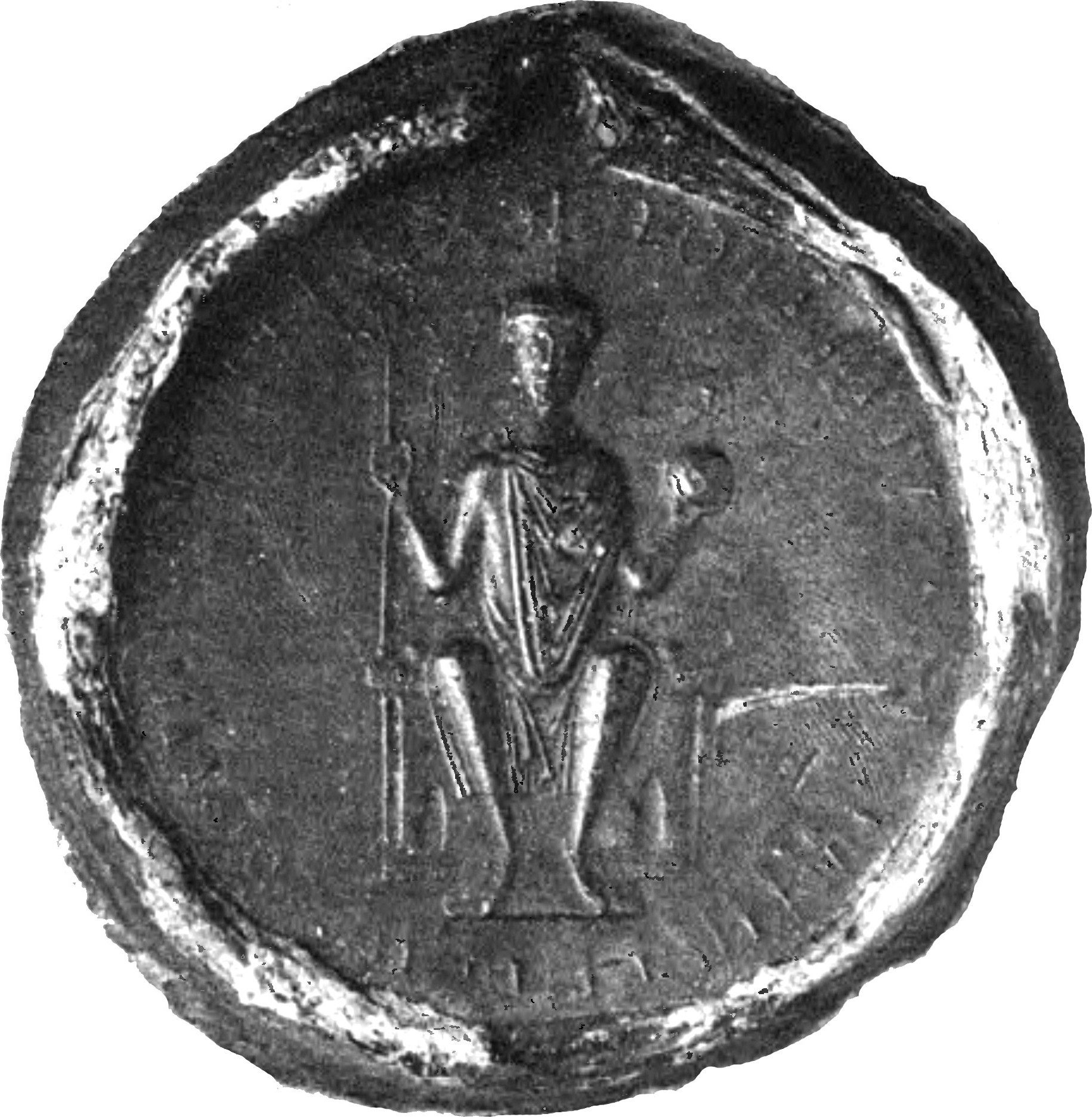
Seal of Lothair III

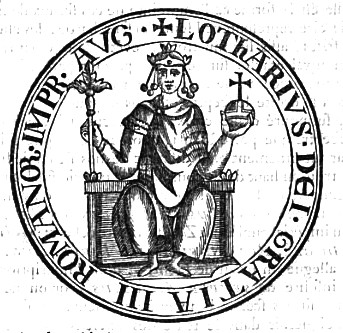
...and sketch graphic

The 1130 papal election had resulted in another schism. A minority of the cardinals elected Innocent II before a majority of the cardinals appointed Anacletus II in a tumultuous process. Both popes claimed to have been legally elected and in a first collision Anacletus prevailed. Innocent had to leave Rome and fled to France. Nonetheless, Anacletus could only secure the support of Roger II of Sicily, Innocent was, with the help of Bernard of Clairvaux, able to secure the support of King Louis VI of France and King Henry I of England.

Both popes offered Lothair the imperial crown. The king was occupied with the Staufer resistance and once again it was Bernard of Clairvaux who convinced the sovereign to favor pope Innocent II. In March 1131 these three met in Liège, where Lothair performed the ceremonial strator service (stirrup holder) for the pope and promised help in the conflict against Anacletus and Roger II of Sicily. His request for investiture restoration was rejected, but all rights and privileges as laid out in the Concordat of Worms were confirmed. Innocent II crowned Lothair King of the Romans again on 29 March 1131.

Lothair was accompanied by a modest troop contingent as most men were garrisoned in Germany to counter Staufer aggression. He carefully avoided hostilities but attempted to besiege Milan, which, however, failed. Eventually he arrived in Rome. As Anacletus controlled St. Peter, Lothair's imperial coronation took place in the Lateran Basilica on 4 June 1133. Emperor Lothair continued to avoid explicit resistance against papal impediments on his royal office. He ignored Innocent's bull, in which he advocated imperial authority derived from him and Lothair recognized papal claims to the vast Matildine estates in Northern Italy (formerly owned by Margravine Matilda of Tuscany), although he was able to secure the territorial fiefs.

=== Campaign against Sicily ===
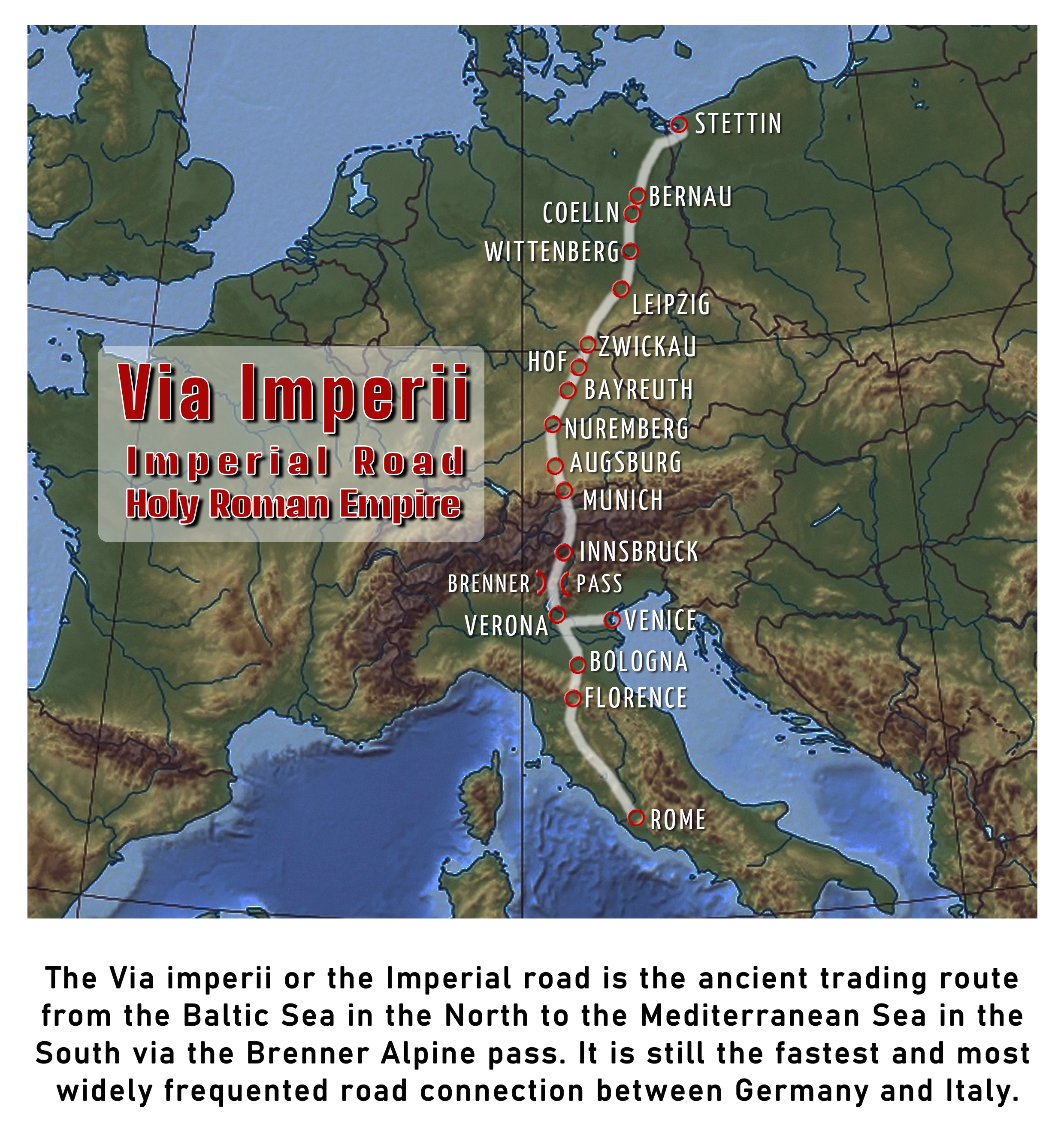
Route of the Via Imperii

In the northern empire Lothair finally succeeded and defeated the Staufers in 1135 thanks to the help of Henry the Proud, who had been the Duke of Bavaria since the death of his father, Henry the Black. At the Reichstag in Bamberg in 1135 the brothers were pardoned and restored to their office and estates. Anti-king Conrad renounced his royal title, the Staufers promised to take part in the Emperor's second Italian campaign, before a ten-year constitutio pacis was declared. Lothair, now uncontested ruler, set out in 1136 with a sizeable army. In 1136 the campaign against Roger began at the insistence of Innocent II and Byzantine Emperor John II Comnenus. Two columns, one led by Lothair, the other by his son-in-law Henry the Proud arrived in Italy. On the river Tronto, Count William of Loritello did homage to Lothair and opened the gates of Termoli to him. Advancing deep into the southern part of the peninsula, the two armies met at Bari, and continued further south in 1137. Roger offered to give Apulia as a fief of the Empire to one of his sons and give another son as a hostage, terms which Lothair refused after being pressured by Innocent II.

The imperial troops, however, were adamant against campaigning during the hot summer and revolted. The emperor, who had hoped for the complete conquest of Sicily, instead captured Capua and Apulia from Roger and bestowed them on Roger's enemies. Innocent, however, protested, claiming that Apulia fell under papal reign. Emperor and Pope eventually jointly bequeathed the duchy to Rainulf of Alife. Lothair resided in Salerno from August to October 1137 and had copper coins (follari) minted in his name.

=== Death ===
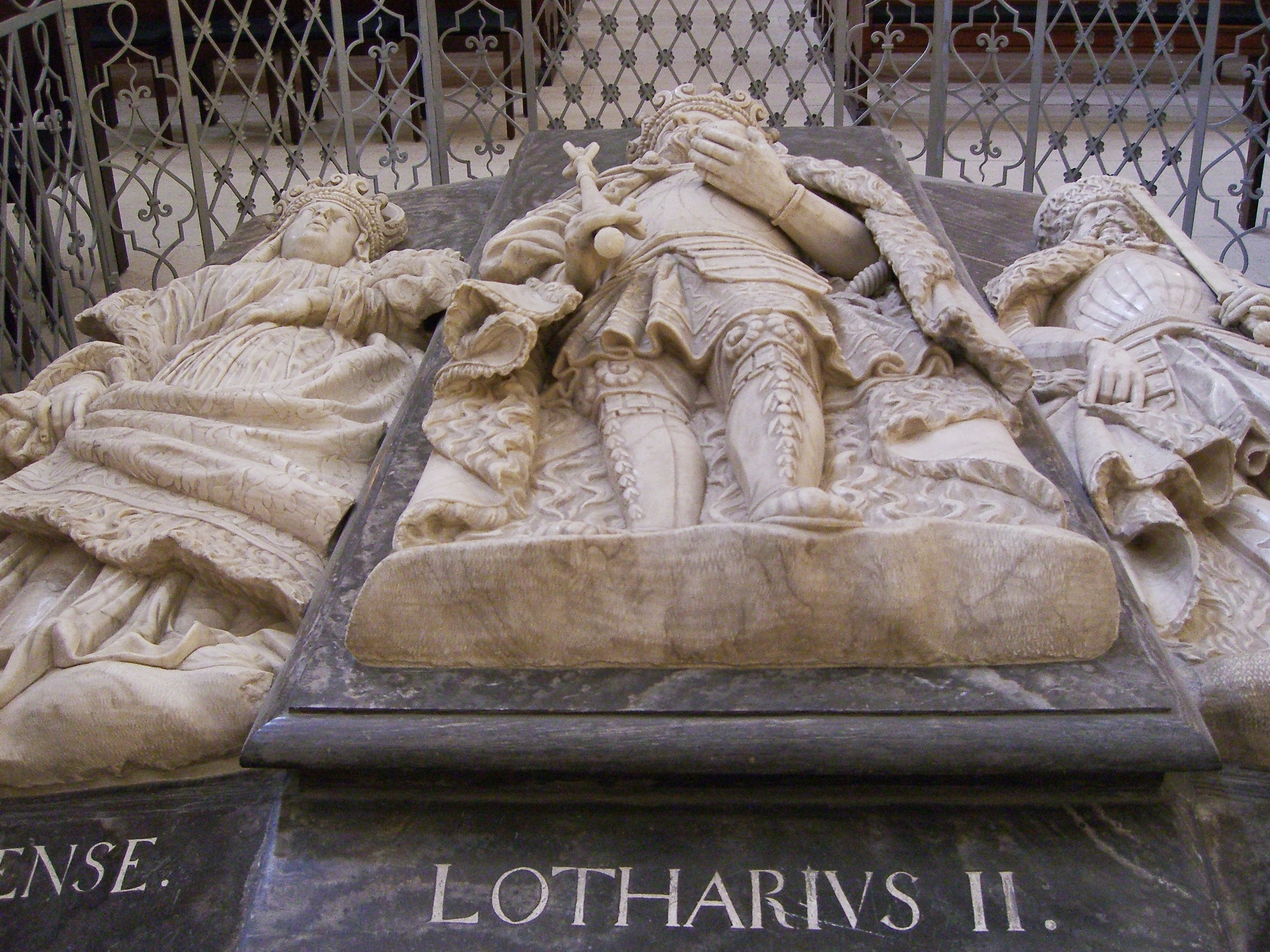
Sarcophagus of Lothair III, his wife Richenza, and their son-in-law Henry in the monastery church (Kaiserdom) in Königslutter

On the return trip, he gave his son-in-law Henry of Bavaria the Margraviate of Tuscany and the Duchy of Saxony. He also gave him the imperial insignia, which depending on the point of view was interpreted as designation for the new king or not. On December 3, 1137, Lothair died on the return journey at Breitenwang. His body was boiled to prevent putrefaction, and his bones were transferred to the Collegiate Church of Saints Peter and Paul at Königslutter, which he had chosen as his burial site and for which he had laid the cornerstone in 1135. A month later, Pope Anaclet II's death also ended the papal schism. When his grave was opened in 1620, a sword and an imperial orb were found among other things. With the imperial cathedral Lothar has created an outstanding architectural monument. His reign was more than just an episode between Salians and Staufer and considered an era of self-confident rule over the empire, even if his political vision of the establishment of a Welf kingdom on March 7, 1138, in Koblenz was destroyed by the “coup d'état” of the Staufers.

== Issue ==
The Süpplingenburg dynasty was only short-lived. By his wife, Richenza of Northeim, Lothair had only one surviving child, a daughter Gertrude, born 18 April 1115. To secure Welf support for his election as king, Lothair married Gertrude to Henry X, Duke of Bavaria, on 29 May 1127. Their only son was Henry the Lion.

After Lothair's death in 1137, the Hohenstaufen Conrad was elected King as Conrad III. Henry the Proud, Lothair’s son-in-law and heir, refused to acknowledge the new king. In response, Conrad III deprived him of all his territories.

== See also ==
- Lotharian legend

== Sources ==
- Hampe, Karl (1973). Germany under the Salian and Hohenstaufen Emperors. ISBN 0631141804.
- Bryce, James (1913). The Holy Roman Empire. London: MacMillan.
- Fuhrmann, Horst (1995). Germany in the High Middle Ages: C.1050-1200. Translated by Reuter, Timothy. Cambridge University Press.
- Comyn, Robert (1851). History of the Western Empire from its Restoration by Charlemagne to the Accession of Charles V. Vol. 1.
- Pavlac, Brian A. (2001). "Lothar III (1075–1137)". In Jeep, John M. (ed.). Medieval Germany. Routledge. pp. 470–71.

Lothair III, Holy Roman Emperor House of Supplinburg Born: 9 June 1075 Died: 4 December 1137
Regnal titles
| Preceded by Henry V | King of the Romans; King of Germany, Burgundy and Italy; 1125–1137 | Succeeded by Conrad III |
| Preceded by Henry V | Holy Roman Emperor; 1133–1137 | Succeeded by Frederick I |
| Preceded by Magnus | — DISPUTED — Duke of Saxony; 1106–1137; Disputed by Otto | Succeeded by Henry II |
