= Simon I of Lorraine =

Duke of Lorraine from 1115 to 1139

Simon I
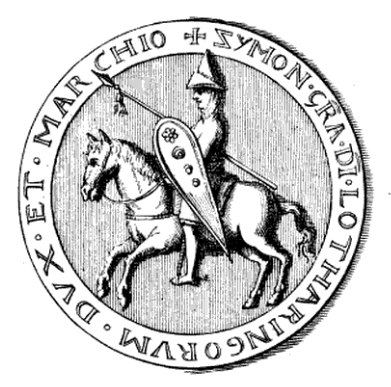
- + SYMON GRA[TIA] D[E]I LOTHARINGORUM DUX ET MARCHIO

Duke of Lorraine
- Reign: 1115 - 1138
- Predecessor: Theodoric II
- Successor: Matthias I
- Born: 1076
- Died: 13 January 1139
- Burial: Saint-Dié
- Spouse: Adelaide of Leuven
- Issue Detail: Matthias I, Duke of Lorraine; Agatha of Lorraine
- House: Metz
- Father: Theodoric II, Duke of Lorraine
- Mother: Hedwig of Formbach

Simon I (1076 – 13 or 14 January 1139) was the duke of Lorraine from 1115 to his death, the eldest son and successor of Theodoric II and Hedwig of Formbach and a half-brother of Emperor Lothair III.

Continuing the policy of friendship with the Holy Roman Emperor, he accompanied the Emperor Henry V to the Diet of Worms of 1122, where the Investiture Controversy was resolved.

He had stormy relations with the episcopates of his realm: fighting with Stephen of Bar, bishop of Metz, and Adalberon, archbishop of Trier, both allies of the count of Bar, whose claim to Lorraine against Simon's father had been quashed by Henry V's father Henry IV. Though Adalberon excommunicated him, Pope Innocent II lifted it. He was a friend of Bernard of Clairvaux and he built many abbeys in his duchy, including that of Sturzelbronn in 1135. There was he interred after his original burial in Saint-Dié.

== Children of Simon and Adelaide ==
Simon I of Lorraine married his step-sister, Adelaide, daughter of Henry III of Leuven. Their children were:

- Matthias, his successor in Lorraine
- Robert, lord of Floranges (near Thionville)
- Agatha of Lorraine, married Reginald III, Count of Burgundy (Renaud III), the first Free Count
- Hedwige, married Frederick III, count of Toul
- Bertha, married Margrave Hermann III of Baden
- Mathilde, married Gottfried I, Count of Sponheim
- Baldwin
- John

== See also ==
- House of Lorraine
- Abbey de Sainte-Marie-au-Bois

== Sources ==
- Bogdan, Henry (2007). La Lorraine des ducs (in French). Perrin.
- Poole, Austin Lane (1927). "England and Burgundy in the last decade of the twelfth century". In Davis, H.W.C. (ed.). Essays in History Presented to Reginald Lane Poole. Oxford at the Clarendon Press. pp. 261–273.

Simon I of Lorraine House of Metz Born: 1076 Died: 13 April 1138
Preceded by Theodoric II	Duke of Lorraine; 1115–1138	Succeeded by Matthias I
