= Osterbach (Biber) =

River in Germany

Location
- Country: Germany
- State: Bavaria

Physical characteristics
- Mouth
  - location: Biber
  - coordinates: 48.4022°N 10.1849°E
- Length: 27.1 km (16.8 mi)

Basin features
- Progression: Biber→ Danube→ Black Sea

Osterbach is a river of Bavaria, Germany. It is a right tributary of the Biber in Bibertal.

== See also ==
- List of rivers of Bavaria
