= Gersprenz =

River in Germany

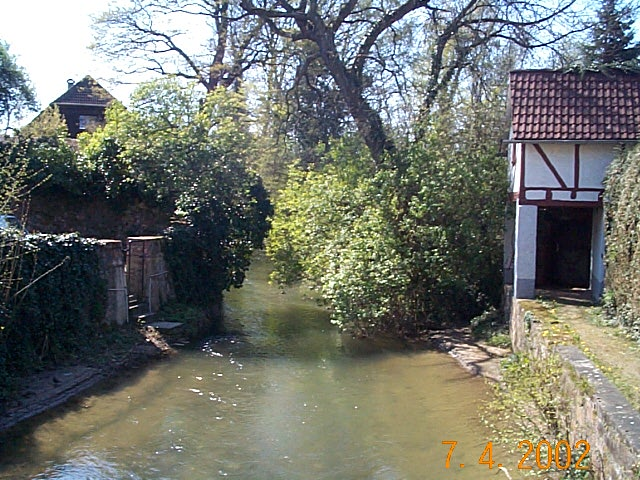
- The Gersprenz in Dieburg

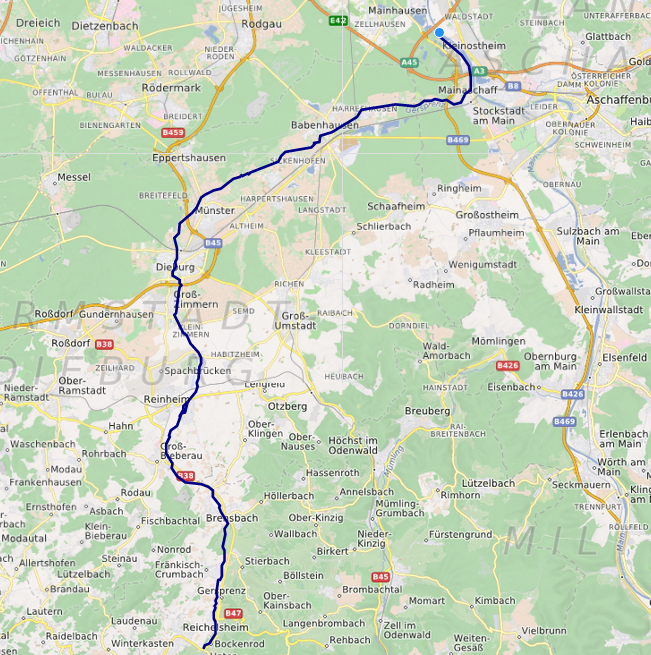
- Course of the Gersprentz (interactive map)

Location
- Country: Germany
- States: Hesse and Bavaria

Physical characteristics
- Mouth
  - location: Main
  - coordinates: 50.0099°N 9.0391°E
- Length: 62.1 km (38.6 mi)
- Basin size: 514 km^{2} (198 sq mi)

Basin features
- Progression: Main→ Rhine→ North Sea
- Tributaries
  - left: Mergbach
  - right: Osterbach

Gersprenz (German pronunciation: [ˈɡɛʁʃpʁɛnts]) is a river that starts in the Odenwald, Hesse and flows into the river Main near Aschaffenburg, Bavaria, Germany. Including its source river Mergbach, it is 62.1 km (38.6 mi) long, without the Mergbach it is 51.3 km (31.9 mi) long.

== Tributaries ==
The tributaries of the Gersprenz (from source to mouth) are as follows:

Left:

- Mergbach (10.9 km)
- Bach an dem Seegrund (1.5 km)
- Michelbach (3.2 km)
- Crumbach (2.3 km)
- Bierbach (2.9 km)
- Küh-Bach (1 km)
- Gräbenackers Bach (2.6 km)
- Fischbach (9.7 km)
- Schaubach (1.4 km)
- Wembach (7.9 km)
- Dilsbach (7.9 km)
- Hirschbach (5 km)
- Erbesbach (9 km)

Right:

- Osterbach (7 km)
- Steinbach (2.6 km)
- Bach an dem Margrund (1 km)
- Bach von dem Vierstöck (2.3 km)
- Kainsbach (6.1 km)
- Affhöllerbach (4.5 km)
- Kilsbach (1.8 km)
- Brensbach (5.2 km)
- Kohlbach (2.3 km)
- Brechelser Floß (1.4 km)

== See also ==
- List of rivers of Hesse
- List of rivers of Bavaria
