= Adalbert, Duke of Lorraine =

Nobleman

Adalbert
- Duke of Lorraine
- Reign: 1047–48
- Predecessor: Godfrey III
- Successor: Gerhard
- Born: c. 1000
- Died: 11 November 1048 (aged 47–48); Thuin
- Father: Gerhard IV of Metz
- Mother: Gisela

Adalbert (c. 1000 – 11 November 1048) was the duke of Upper Lorraine from 1047 until his death the next year.

== Life ==
Adalbert was the first son of Gerhard IV, count of Metz, and Gisela or Gisella, possibly a daughter of Theodoric I, Duke of Upper Lorraine. His grandfather Adalbert had inherited the county of Metz from his brother Gerhard of the Moselle.

Gothelo I, Duke of Lorraine, died in 1044 and was succeeded by his sons. The elder became Godfrey III in Upper Lorraine but was refused Lower Lorraine by the Holy Roman Emperor Henry the Pious, who granted it to his younger brother instead. Irritated, Godfrey rebelled the same year and devastated his overlord's estates in Lower Lorraine. He was soon defeated and Adalbert named in his place in Upper Lorraine. Godfrey continued to fight for all Lorraine and Adalbert died in battle against him at Thuin on 11 November 1048.

Adalbert had no known sons, and Henry III, Holy Roman Emperor immediately nominated his brother Gerhard to succeed him.

== Mistaken genealogy ==
In 1960, Szabolcs de Vajay hypothesized that Adalbert was count of Longwy and father-in-law of William VII of Aquitaine and William I, Count of Burgundy. He was followed in this by Frederick Lewis Weis, but De Vajay subsequently published an unqualified retraction of his earlier hypothesis.

Ancestors of Adalbert, Duke of Lorraine

Adalbert II, Count of Metz
Gerhard IV, Count of Metz
Conrad I, Duke of Swabia
Judith of Öhningen
Adalbert, Duke of Lorraine
Gisela

== See also ==
- Dukes of Lorraine family tree

Adalbert, Duke of Lorraine House of Metz Born: 1000 Died: November 11 1048
Preceded by Godfrey III	Duke of Upper Lorraine; 1047–1048	Succeeded by Gerhard
