= Vornbach Abbey =

Monastery in Neuhaus am Inn, Germany

Coordinates: 48°27′37″N 13°25′36″E

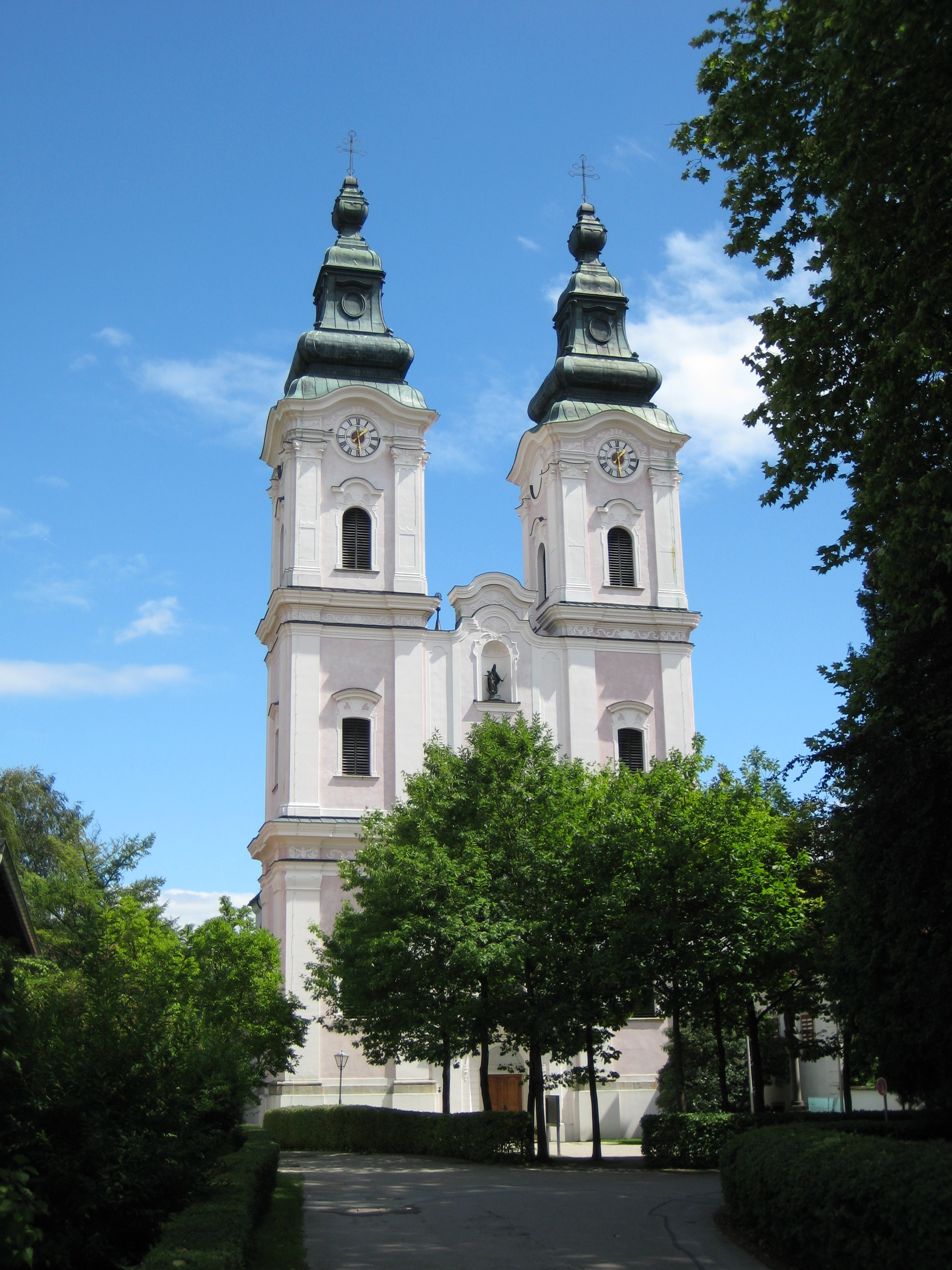
Western facade of Parish Church of the Assumption

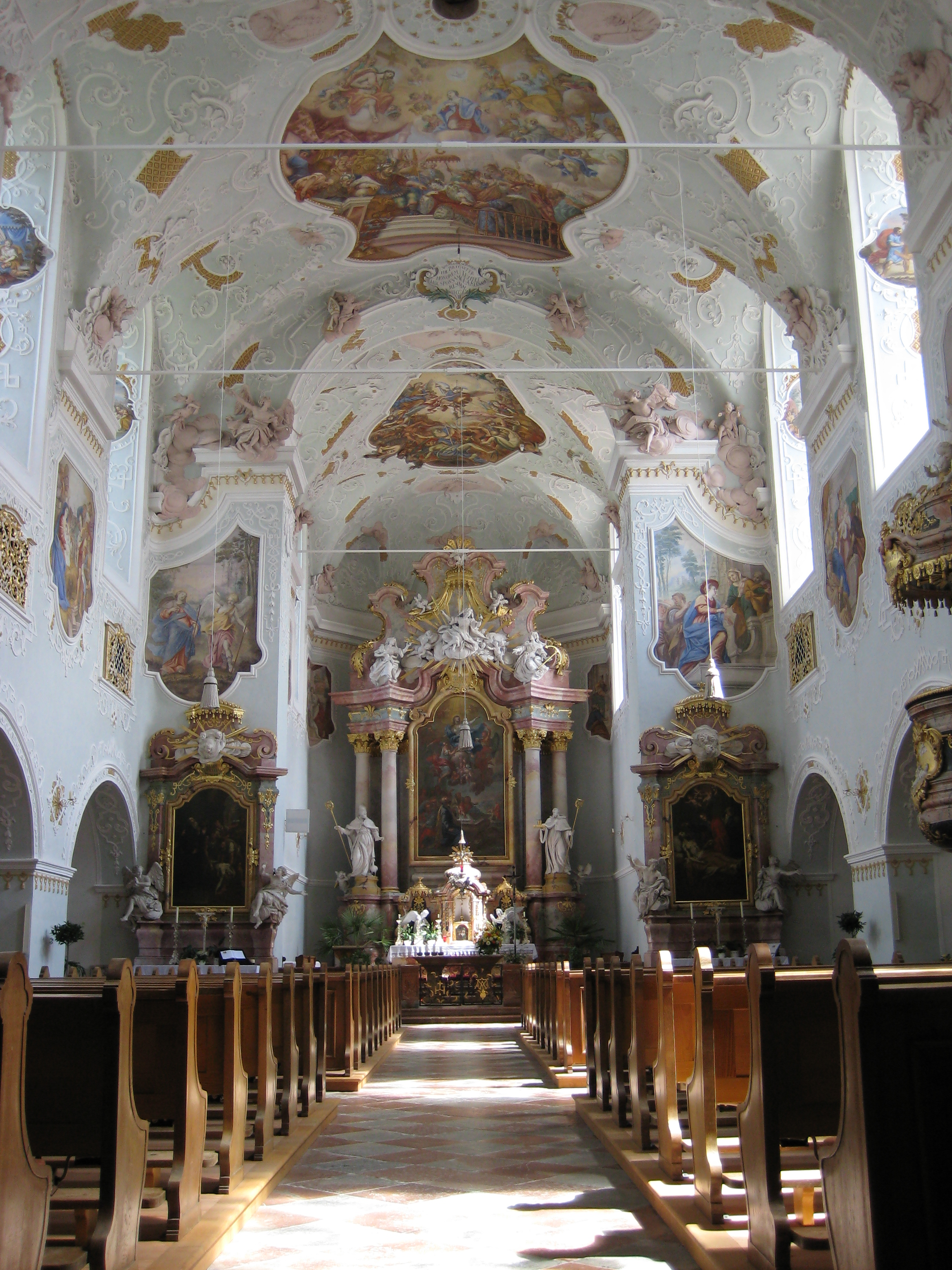
Interior of Parish Church

Vornbach Abbey (German: Kloster Vornbach, sometimes spelt Formbach) was a Benedictine monastery in Neuhaus am Inn in Bavaria, Germany.

== History ==
The monastery, dedicated to the Virgin Mary and Saint Benedict, was founded in 1094 by Count Ekkebert of Formbach and his wife Mathilde, and also by Count Ulrich of Windberg.

It was dissolved in 1803 during the secularisation of Bavaria. The monastic buildings came into the possession of Franz X. Bachmayr, and in 1857 into that of the Baron von Schätzler. The abbey's Austrian possessions were taken by the state.
