= Adelaide of Leuven =

Consort duchess of Lorraine (died c. 1158)

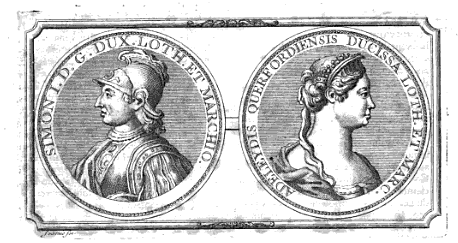
- Simon I and his wife Adelaide.
- Died: c. 1158
- Noble family: House of Reginar
- Spouse: Simon I, Duke of Lorraine
- Issue: Matthias I, Duke of Lorraine; Robert, Lord of Floranges; Agatha of Lorraine; Hedwige; Bertha; Mathilde; Baldwin; John
- Father: Henry III of Leuven
- Mother: Gertrude of Flanders

Adelaide of Leuven (died c. 1158) was the wife of Simon I, Duke of Lorraine (1076–1138), in what is now France. She was the daughter of Henry III of Leuven and his wife Gertrude of Flanders. After the death of her husband, Adelaide retired to Tart Abbey.

The children of Simon I and Adelaide included:

- Matthias I, Duke of Lorraine
- Robert, Lord of Floranges
- Agatha of Lorraine, wife of Renaud III, Count of Burgundy
- Hedwige, wife of Frederick III, count of Toul
- Bertha, wife of Margrave Hermann III of Baden
- Mathilde, wife of Gottfried I, Count of Sponheim
- Baldwin
- John

When her husband died in 1138, Adelaide went to the Cistercian house of Tart. Later on, in 1148, Adelaide founded the abbey of Etanche in the diocese of Toul. She was also in correspondence with Bernard of Clairvaux, according to several letters written between the two.
