= Gerard, Duke of Lorraine =

Duke of Lorraine (c. 1030–1070)

Gerard I
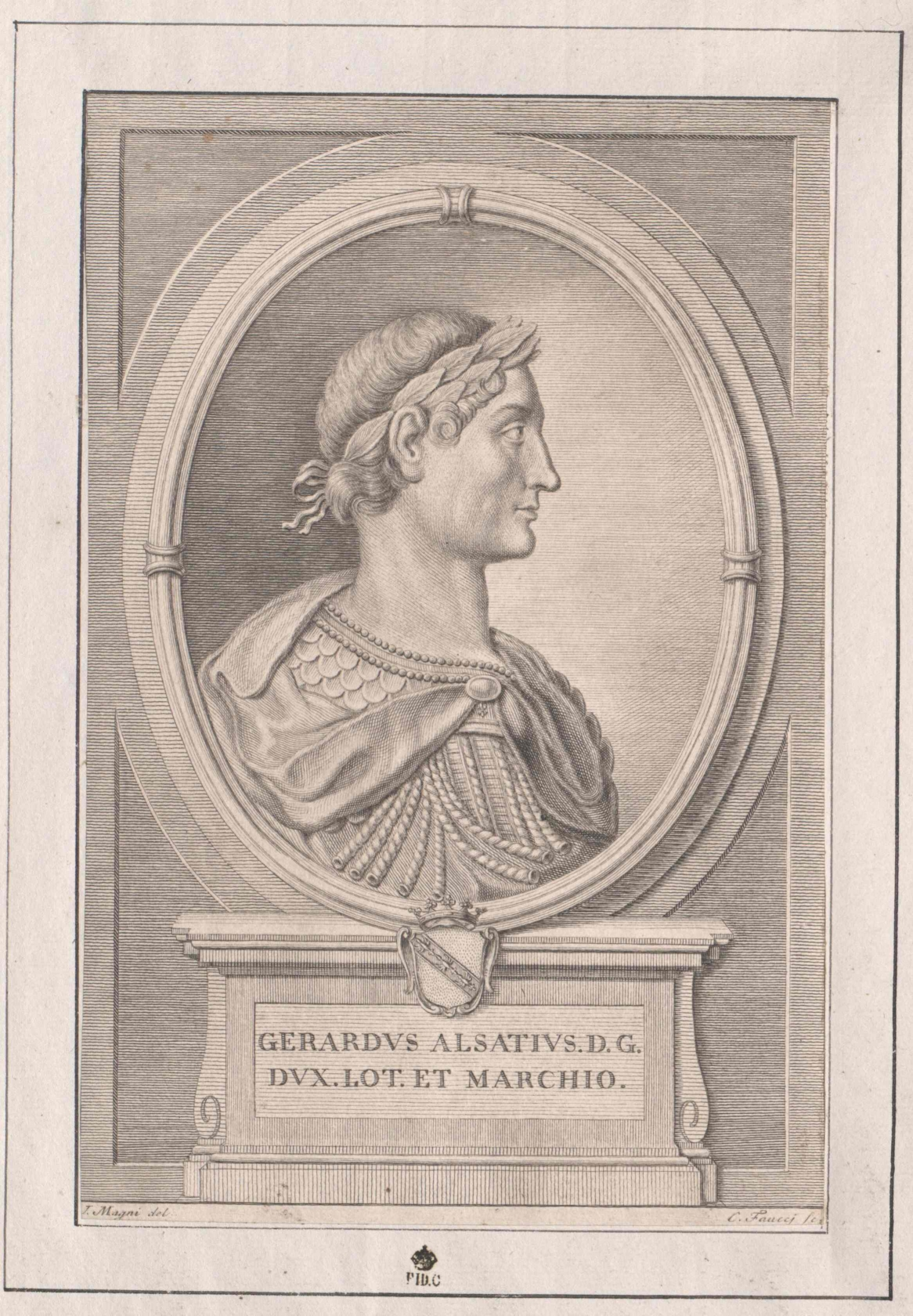
- 18th century portrait

Duke of Lorraine
- Reign: 1048–1070
- Predecessor: Adalbert, Duke of Lorraine
- Successor: Theodoric II, Duke of Lorraine
- Born: c. 1030
- Died: 14 April or 11 August 1070; Remiremont
- Spouse: Hedwige of Namur
- Issue: Theodoric II, Duke of Lorraine; Gerard; Beatrice of Lorraine, Countess of Burgundy; Gisela
- House: House of Lorraine
- Father: Gerhard IV of Metz
- Mother: Gisela

Gerard (c. 1030 – 14 April 1070), also known as Gerard the Wonderful, was a Lotharingian nobleman. He was the count of Metz and Châtenois from 1047 to 1048, when his brother Duke Adalbert resigned them to him upon his becoming the Duke of Upper Lorraine. On Adalbert's death the next year, Gerard became duke, a position that he held until his death. In contemporary documents, he is called Gerard of Alsace (after the fact that he had some land in Alsace), Gerard of Chatenoy (after an ancestral castle near Neufchâteau), or Gerard of Flanders (after his wife's homeland).

He was the second son of Gerhard IV of Metz, count of Metz, and Gisela who was possibly a daughter of Theodoric I, Duke of Upper Lorraine. Henry III, Holy Roman Emperor, invested Adalbert with Lorraine in 1047 after confiscating it from Godfrey III. Godfrey did not back down, however, and killed Adalbert in battle. Henry subsequently bestowed it on Gerard, but the deposed duke continued to stir. Godfrey had the support of a faction of the nobles who did not want a strong hand at the ducal helm and Gerard was imprisoned. Gerard, however, had the support of the chiefest of his bishops, that of Toul, Bruno of Eguisheim-Dagsburg (later the sainted Pope Leo IX), who procured his liberation in 1049. The emperor gave him troops to assist him in his fight, for the rebels had the support of some elements in the church. Gerard himself remained, as his brother had, faithful to the end to the imperial dynasty and his descendants would remain so as well even into the Hohenstaufen years.

His alliance with the church was regular but inconstant and he afforded his protection to Moyenmoutier Abbey, Saint-Mihiel Abbey, and Remiremont Abbey. The former was the abbey of Cardinal Humbert of Silva Candida, who excommunicated the patriarch of Constantinople, Michael I Cerularius, in 1054, thus precipitating the Great Schism, and the latter was his own final resting place.

On 18 June 1053, Gerard and Prince Rudolf of Benevento led papal and Swabian troops into battle on behalf of Pope Leo. This was the Battle of Civitate and it was a disastrous loss for the pope. His enemy, the Normans, under Humphrey of Hauteville and Richard of Aversa, defeated his allies and captured his person, taking him prisoner in Benevento. Gerard, however, returned to Lorraine.

Among his other construction projects, was that of the castle of Prény, in the centre of the duchy, the beginnings of the capital city, Nancy. He died at Remiremont while trying to kill a revolt. Poisoning was suspected. The date of his death is either 14 April or 11 August.

He was married to Hedwige of Namur (or of Flanders), daughter of Albert II, Count of Namur, and Regelindis of Lower Lorraine, daughter of Gothelo I, Duke of Lorraine. This marriage helped patch up relations with the baronage. They had the following issue:

- Theodoric II, Duke of Lorraine (c. 1055 – 1115), successor in Lorraine
- Gerard (1057–1108), count of Vaudémont
- Beatrice, married Stephen I, Count of Burgundy, Mâcon and Vienne
- Gisela, abbess of Remiremont

He was the patrilineal ancestor of the line of dukes which ruled Lorraine until 1737 and of the Habsburg-Lorraine dynasty that ruled Tuscany (1737–1859), the Holy Roman Empire (1745–1807), Austria-Hungary (1780–1918), the Duchy of Parma (1814–1847), Duchy of Modena (1815–1859) and Mexico (1864–1867).

== Ancestry ==
Ancestors of Gerard, Duke of Lorraine

Richard, Count of Metz
Adalbert II, Count of Metz
Gerhard IV, Count of Metz
Conrad I, Duke of Swabia
Judith of Öhningen
Gerard, Duke of Lorraine
Gisela

== See also ==
- House of Lorraine

Gerard, Duke of Lorraine House of Metz Born: c. 1030 Died: 14 April 1070
Preceded by Adalbert	Duke of Lorraine; 1048–1070	Succeeded by Theodoric II
