= Alpert of Metz =

Benedictine chronicler (d. 1024)

Alpert of Metz (died 1024) was a Benedictine chronicler of the eleventh century. His De diversitate temporum is a major source for the history of Western Europe (particularly for France, Western Germany, Belgium and the Netherlands) in the period it covers, which is 990 to 1021. It was dedicated to Burchard of Worms.

Alpert wrote other works, including a partial biography of Bishop Dietrich I of Metz.
