= Siege of Bitche =

1870 siege during the Franco-Prussian war

- Part of Franco-Prussian War
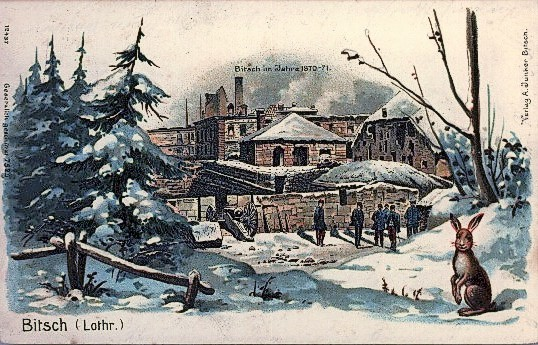
- Bitche in 1870
Date	August 8, 1870, to March 26, 1871
Location	Bitche, Alsace, France
Result	German victory

Belligerents
French Empire French Republic	North German Confederation: Prussia; Bavaria German Empire

Commanders and leaders
Louis-Casimir Teyssier; Geniès-Hippolyte Bousquet	Prince Frederick Charles; Colonel Kohlermann

Units involved
I Corps	II Corps

Strength
1,000 to 3,000 Infantry, 80 Cannons	20,000

Casualties and losses
120 dead, Unknown wounded	23 dead, 62 wounded

The siege of Bitche was a battle during the Franco-Prussian War initially caused by the German forces on August 8, 1870, to March 26, 1871, where the two nations would sign an armistice. The siege was considered a brave siege under the command of governor Louis-Casimir Teyssier, and of the chief of the troops of the place: Geniès-Hippolyte Bousquet who both would be appointed lieutenant-colonels during the siege.

== Background ==
Otto von Bismarck believed that a Franco-German war was necessary for the benefit of Prussia. The Ems Dispatch affair would ignite the casus-belli in accordance with his wishes and despite the lack of enthusiasm of Napoleon III. When France declared war the now North German Confederation on July 19, 1870, Prussia has 450,000 well-trained men, equipped with an efficient weaponry with an inconspicuous and practical uniforms. As for the French army, the army was reduced to the Army of the Rhine at the start of the conflict and despite the army's equipment, it was not prepared for war. Dressed too conspicuously and mis-use of its superior equipment, the French army presented a perfect target for the enemy. The facts will prove later that if the soldiers of the Imperial German army defeated France in most of the earlier battles, with the Germans advancing towards Bitche which had a stronghold which had been classified as a first-class stronghold in 1850 that would lead to a difficult siege.

According to an account on January 1. 1870, the Citadel of Bitche contained 53 cannons, 4,662 rifles and 1,399,416 cartridges, more than 120 tons of powder and 26,128 large caliber projectiles. When conflict broke out on July 19, 1870, there was no additional supply to the fortress. On July 9, 1870, Louis-Casimir Teyssier, a combat experienced French Army officer, was appointed commander of the citadel. He set up his headquarters in the town hall. Prior to assuming command at Bitche, Teyssier commanded an infantry battalion at the city. Before coming to Bitche, he was battalion commander of an infantry regiment in Thionville. It was only at the start of hostilities that he transferred his home to the fortress where the setting up of the guns only took place after the Battle of Wörth and under the direction of an artillery captain, Captain Rossin who retreated shortly after battle.

Bitche became the gathering point of the 5th Corps under the command of French General Failly. On July 18, 1870, the day before the official declaration of war, the square was home to seventeen battalions of infantry and two regiments of cavalry.

The July 23, 1870, General Failly transfers the headquarters to Bitche Sarreguemines, giving way to the troops of General Guyot Lespart with his 3rd Division consisting of 17th, 27th, 30th and 68th infantry regiments. On July 24, 1870, The German regiment, Uhlan regiment began sabotaging the railway of Bitche-Sarreguemines near Bliesbruck in order to isolate Bitche from supplies.

== Beginning of the conflict ==
The July 29, 1870, the first clash took place near Breidenbach, about ten kilometers north of Bitche between a patrol of the 5th German Dragons and a French patrol. The French avant-garde reacted by establishing intrenchment work on the heights of Hanviller on July 31, 1870, which was a village six kilometers north of Bitche. On August 1, 1870, The light horse of Major von Egloffstein and men of the 12th Prussians under the command of Major Von Parry form a group of fifty soldiers to Eppenbrunn, village-border town, from where they head to the road Bitche- Wissembourg. These German scouts were attacked in Sturzelbronn by elements of the French infantry and retreated in the direction of Ludwigswinkel by taking the steep paths by the Mühlenbach farm. A German hussar was captured at the Mühlenbach farm while treating his injured horse.

General Failly was informed of the decision of the Germans heading for Wissembourg by the Germans and the progression of the 3rd East German Army. He was ordered to assemble all his troops in Bitche. Following these directives, the Lespart division which had advanced to the vicinity of Pirmasens withdrew to Bitche on August 2, 1870. General de Failly arrives at Bitche with the rest of the Corps on the evening of August 5, 1870.

In the morning of August 6, 1870, an order from Marshal Mac-Mahon enjoins the Bitchois troops to send a division without delay to Philippsbourg, seventeen kilometers to the south-west, to join Wissembourg the next day with the rest of the Corps. In the morning of August 6, 1870, Lespart's division leaves the Place de Bitche to go to Philippsbourg where it learns of the French defeat of Wœrth. This bad news was also telegraphed to Bitche by the Bannstein station master at around five o'clock. Further progressing a few kilometers in the deep valley towards Niederbronn, the French division takes up position on the heights to the right and left of the spa. These observation troops are drawn into retirement by the survivors of the army of MacMahon to Saverne and to Bitche with a few thousand survivors of the 1st Body.

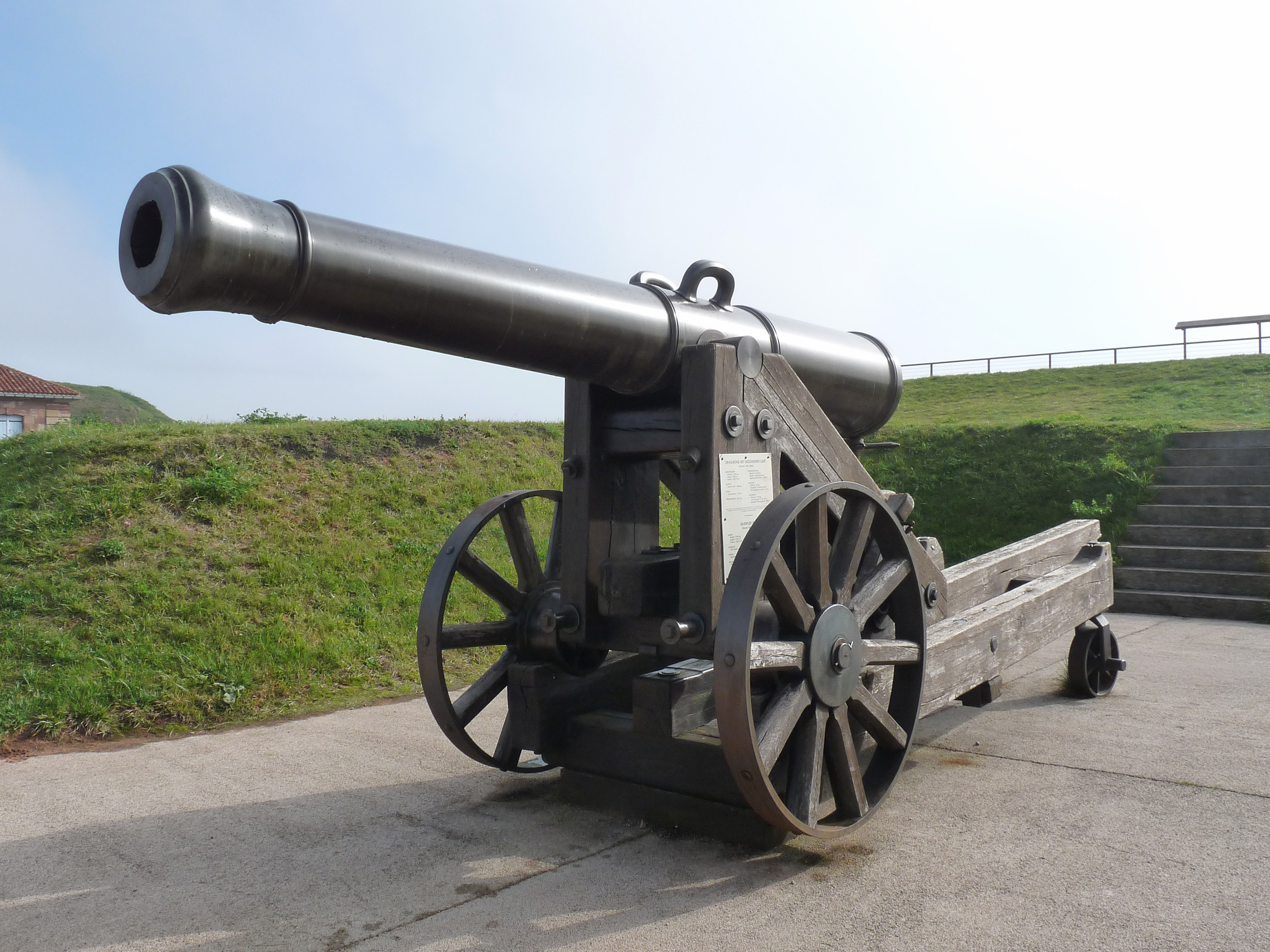
Identical copy of a rifled 24 square gun used during the siege

The Fontanges brigade takes the direction of Saverne while the Albatucci brigade moves towards Bitche. At that time, the bitchoise garrison consisted of 800 soldiers of the 86th, 250 reserve gunners of customs, Guard mobile bitchois, isolated, of lame, of linemen to riders of infantry, of Zouaves and survivors of the battle of Froeschwiller-Woerth. In fact, this motley troop represents exactly 72 different regiments. Numbering 2,400, these soldiers took refuge in part on the citadel and in the entrenched camp in front of Fort Saint-Sébastien. The armament at their disposal is composed of 53 guns of which only 17 are usable. Unlike the enemy troops, the French entrenched in Bitche do not yet have hunting pots but old models with snuff boxes.

In Bitche, General de Failly waited in vain for orders after being informed of the fighting at the Hospital, near Forbach and Wœrth, in the southwest. In the evening of August 6, 1870, he decided to leave Bitche for Petite-Pierre with his two divisions, leaving the Trains in Bitche. The German command assuming at this point that MacMahon was entrenched in bitchoise instead, orders the 12th German division, placed next to Pirmasens, progressed towards Bitche. During their advance, they received information from scouts who have reached Haspelschiedt and Sturzelbronn on August 7, 1870. The Germans observed, on the night of 7 to August 8, 1870, that routed French soldiers crossed Éguelshardt and that many units bivouacking in Bitche withdrew to the south.

But when the 4th Squadron 5th Regiment Dragons German approached the Citadel on August 8, 1870, they were targeted by the artillery pieces of the fortress and which caused four dead (who are buried provisionally in Haspelschiedt) and five wounded. The squadron then retreated. The same day, a brigade of artillery of 2nd Artillery Regiment Bavarian is sent to the city. After having climbed the Kindelberg Hill and having fired a few shells at the citadel, she received a sharp French response. An artilleryman is killed and four others wounded. The piece of artillery destroyed, the Bavarians immediately retreated.

Bitche's resistance neutralized the main lines of communication, which considerably hampered the advance of German troops. The 2nd Bavarian Corps then went to Lemberg by taking forest paths by the Hochkopf hill after having left an infantry battalion and a squadron of light horses in observation near Bitche. As for the 12th German Division from near Pirmasens, it gains the same day the villages of Lengelsheim and Schorbach, after taking the old road Roman of Walschbronnin Schorbach by the heights of Bousseviller and Hanviller. On August 9, 1870, this division is leaving the villages of Lengelsheim and Schorbach to reach Petit-Réderching where Prince Frederick Charles arrived the day before with his 4th Corps from Volmunster in order to cut the road to MacMahon that the Germans still assume Bitche.

The August 11, 1870, the observation of German troops left near Bitche are identified by the 1st Battalion, 7th Bavarian Infantry Regiment charged with protecting military ambulances on Reichshoffen and Niederbronn and responsible for sending observation patrols in Bitche. The citadel and the entrenched camp no longer sheltered, at that time, more than 2,400 men. To prevent the surviving troops from Wœrth and Forbach from spreading demoralizing rumors among his own troops who had taken refuge in the citadel and among the population of Bitche, Commander Teyssier ordered the soldiers to regroup at Fort Saint-Sébastien and in the entrenched camp at the foot of this fort. To strengthen the morale of his soldiers in the citadel, Teyssier explains to them the strategic importance of Bitche in the event of a German retreat.

Realizing that the Bitchois troops hinder too much his strategy and his victorious progress until then, the German commander created a special detachment in Germersheim, north of Karlsruhe, to reduce Bitche's resistance. This detachment has 1850 men and is formed by members of the 2nd Battalion 4th Regiment Bavarian Infantry, the 29th reserve battalion, an officer and eight riders, with 4 guns of 12 pounds to 44 strokes and incendiary shells. Under the orders of Colonel Kohlermann, with 112 horses and 13 vehicles, this detachment arrives at Niederbronn on August 22, 1870, and immediately summons the commander of the citadel asking him to give up the place.

== Bombing ==
On the night of August 22 to 23, 1870, the Bavarians hardly installed an artillery battery on the hill of Grand-Otterbiel, located 1,100 meters north of the citadel. This hill has the advantage of being at the same altitude (366 meters) as the citadel. In the morning of August 23, 1870, the besieged of the place are awakened by explosions. The third shell falls on the Grosse-Tête of the citadel, more exactly on the prison where several German prisoners are locked up, one of whom is wounded. German fire continued for two hours, causing fifty-two cluster shells and twenty-five incendiary shells to fall on the citadel. As there was no result in the response from the citadel, Colonel Kohlermann had the fire stopped at seven in the morning and sent a parliamentarian to ask Teyssier again to surrender. The latter reiterates his refusal and Kohlermann understands that he will need a more powerful artillery to reduce the place. Retiring to a bivouac located between Lengelsheim and Hanviller, he decided to wait for the delivery of more efficient weapons.

Note that the French response to this morning bombardment caused losses to the German assailant: an officer and two servants were wounded by French fire. From August 23 to 27, 1870, German activity was reduced to approach work in the woods of the Rosselle coast, digging entrenchments and installing artillery positions. Commander Teyssier then decides to harass the assailant.

On the night of August 29 to 30, 1870, at two o'clock in the morning, four hundred French soldiers left the entrenched camp in three columns to harass the German positions installed south of the road to Sarreguemines on the Rosselle plateau. This diversion allows the French to destroy sites intended for German pieces and to shoot at the bivouacs of the latter. On August 31, 1870, two German parliamentarians presented themselves again at the foot of the citadel with newspapers intended to demonstrate to the besieged the futility of their resistance. On Teyssier's orders, Lieutenant Mondelli had them turned away. That same day, the German troops received reinforcements with the order to definitively reduce the inner-city of Bitche.

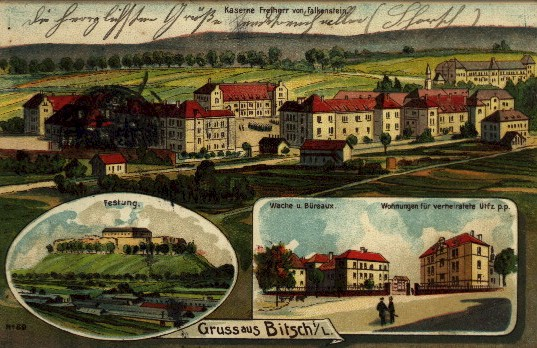
Overview of Bitche

Encouraged by the success of their previous outing, the French engaged in a slight skirmish on September 1, 1870, at half past four near the road to Sarreguemines. On the night of 3 to September 4, 1870, Teyssier had another diversion exit executed from the entrenched camp. Eight hundred soldiers are divided into three distinct groups with the following missions:

- The left column would search the woods, attack the Germans and occupy the positions on the Rosselle north of the road to Sarreguemines
- The central column is responsible for neutralizing the farms of Freudenberg, Simserhof and Légeret,
- The right column would harass the Germans by making a movement turning south of the road to Sarreguemines.

But the Germans are on their guard, the element of surprise fails and the fight that follows lasts three hours, finally forcing the French to retreat. The Bavarian losses amount to nine soldiers, two officers and twenty-nine wounded, while Teyssier's soldiers deplore nine killed, sixty-two wounded and thirty men taken prisoner by the Bavarians. Said violent fights took place at the place called Milchenbach on the left of the road to Sarreguemines. The German headquarters are also located not far away, on the Freudenberg farmland. This day is however a day of joy for the Germans who learn of the defeat of Sedan.

As for Commander Teyssier, he was informed of the Sedan debacle on September 2, 1870, by an emissary from Metz. In order not to break the morale of his troops and the people of Bitche, he prefers to keep the news quiet. The following day, 1st Battalion, 8th Bavarian Infantry Regiment reinforces the besiegers. Come Germersheim, it splits equally between Schorbach and Reyersviller while the battalion 4th Infantry meets at the center of the line to farms Simserhof and Légeret. From the artillery heavy is placed in the tile of Hottviller. Place de Bitche is now isolated.

On September 5, 1870, the Germans receive a reinforcement of sixteen pieces of twelve pounds and four pieces of six pounds with two hundred shells per piece. The bombardment of Bitche is imminent. The following day on September 6, 1870, the German troops take the following positions:

- The 1st Battalion, 8th Regiment Bavarian Infantry settled near the road to Lemberg and to the industrial areas of Reyersviller,
- The 5th, 7th and 8th Companies 4th Infantry Regiment settled on the road Sarreguemines farm of Légeret,
- The 3rd Battalion of the 4th Infantry Regiment took place at the farm near Susel Schorbach,
- The 34th battalion 8th regiment infantry remains in reserve Simserhof,
- Eight riders assigned to patrol permanently to observe the roads of Zweibrücken, Wissembourg and Haguenau.

German troops set up six batteries with three hundred shells each from the 6th on September 11, 1870, as the rain falls continuously. German troops then numbered 3,788 men and 24 pieces of artillery. These parts are grouped into six batteries located as follows:

- A first to the northeast of Reyersviller on the northeast edge of the Schimberg hill covered with forests and 1,700 meters from the citadel,
- The second is on the road to Reyersviller, 1,800 meters from the citadel,
- Three other batteries occupy La Roselle between the Chemin de Reyersviller and the Route de Sarreguemines, so 2,000 meters from the square,
- The last battery is placed at the edge of the Schiesseck forest 500 meters north of the Sarreguemines road, on the edge of the forest.

The locations of the artillery pieces dominate the top of the citadel by about thirty meters: the bombardment can begin. September 11, 1870, the bombardment begins without warning at ten o'clock in the morning with twenty-four pieces starting to spit fire. The citadel immediately responded with its fourteen cannons and the exchange of fire continued most of the day. Near the buildings set ablaze on the citadel, the French guns ceased to reply around noon while the Germans continued their fire until eleven o'clock.

These shots resumed during the night, forcing the citadel to retaliate until the morning of September 12, 1870, at nine. The German guns continued their bombardment on the entrenched camp behind Fort Saint-Sébastien and, from six o'clock in the afternoon, the German gunners, overwhelmed by the bitchoise resistance, received the order to bomb the houses of the town spared until then. The vision becomes Dantesque : the buildings on the citadel and the burning houses of the city light up the night, as the glowing sky is obscured by clouds of smoke. In town, seventy houses are set ablaze as well as the town hall.

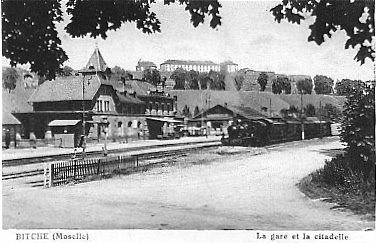
View of the station and the citadel

The next day the September 13, 1870, Mr. Lautenschlager, mayor of the city, asks Commander Teyssier to suspend firing in order to ask Colonel Kohlermann, the leader of the besiegers, to allow those who wish to leave the city. Kohlemann refuses at first, then declares that the population who left would do so on their own responsibility. Teyssier then made arrangements for the evacuation. He is not unhappy to save food for his rationed troops in this way. In thisSeptember 13, 1870, a certain number of Bitchois left the city to settle in the surrounding villages, mainly in Mouterhouse and Baerenthal, but also in Lemberg, Goetzenbruck, Meisenthal, Saint-Louis, Haspelschiedt and Éguelshardt. There is a controversy between historians on the number of these starters: the number varying from 500 to 1,760 depending on the sources.

After the departure of these volunteers (including the mayor and the parish priest), Commandant Teyssier appoints a municipal commission chaired by Mr. Lamberton. However, the Germans push back inside the city a group of patients affected by smallpox, perhaps with the aim of also infecting the recalcitrant garrison. The shootings resumed on September 14, 1870, on the citadel, on the city and the entrenched camp. Thick smoke floats above the valley subjected to this continuous bombardment. A tragedy almost occurred that day on the citadel: a burning building located on the Grosse-Tête housed a casemate with ten tons of powder in barrels. The fire was brought under control at the last minute, and it is easy to imagine what could have happened if the powder had caught fire.

As the shells continued to fall day and night on the citadel, the French soldiers lost all notion of sleep. Food is rationed, the fire and smoke seize the men by the throat, the water from the well becomes cloudy and the men who have taken refuge in the undergrounds hear only the dull sound of shells exploding on the surface and the cries of beasts that are found in the dungeons. These shelter not only a hospital, but also toilets, rooms for officers, rooms for the troops, a bakery, a butcher's shop, a well, a stable room, stores of food and ammunition. On September 16 and 17, 1870, the Germans use four new pieces of campaign to bombard Bitche: they are installed at the edge of the forest of Rothenstieg and on the ground located between the hills of Grand- and Petit-Otterbiel. The bombardments slow down from September 18, 1870, which does not prevent the French pieces from constantly retaliating. The September 19, 1870, Commander Teyssier decides to reduce the rice ration to forty grams per head per day.

In the evening of September 20, 1870, the Germans gradually stop their fire. A parliamentary comes Teyssier to announce that the Republic is proclaimed in Paris and Guillaume I er is under the walls of the capital. Teyssier dismisses the parliamentarian after declaring that he wants proof. The noise of the cannons ceases on September 21, 1870: the shootings on the citadel and on the town of Bitche lasted exactly ten days and ten nights. The results of this bombardment are very heavy. The 7,100 German projectiles which fell on Bitche and its citadel sowed death and destruction: of the 390 houses in the city, 121 buildings were completely destroyed and 184 others partially damaged. 135 Bitchois households lose their homes. As for the citadel, all the buildings except the chapel were destroyed by incendiary shells. What motivates the stopping of the German bombardments is an order of the general-governor of Alsace, the count of Bismarck-Bohlen, who realized that the siege and the bombardment costed too much materials and immobilized too many troops. On his order, the German coins were removed on September 25, 1870.

== The Blockade ==
From the September 25, 1870, the real blockade of the city takes place. The Germans confined themselves to observing the activity of the small city, blocking the access roads to Niederbronn and Lemberg by installing barracks behind the Pfaffenberg and in Schwangerbach, while carrying out patrols to the north and west of the city. The results of the bombings and the siege were not long in coming: an epidemic of typhus and smallpox broke out among the already severely affected population. Commander Teyssier organizes transport by ambulanceswith the help of the women of the city and her Sisters of Charity. He improvised a hospital at the College of Augustins and a white flag was hoisted above the Institute transformed into a military hospital.

The tactic of the besieged French troops is henceforth to harass the Germans by outside patrols. Although they have displayed bilingual signs saying that "Any action and any attempt to supply the square would be punished with death", the town is supplied day and night by the inhabitants of the neighboring villages, even by women. and children who bring food there. Four French companies carry out a diversionary exit on the night of September 29, 1870 and pushed back German approach on the road to Sarreguemines. Another exit on October 2, 1870 results in the fire of the farm of Freudenberg during a skirmish which makes six killed French, six killed German and six wounded German. Other exits are made towards the route to Wissembourg, towards the Cense aux Loups.

The October 7, 1870, a new German parliamentarian comes to the citadel. Commander Teyssier instructs the adjutant of the place to have him turned away with the answer: "Any step is useless: we will not give back!". In Sarreguemines and Niederbronn support committees are created which succeed in sending beds, mattresses, clothes and food to the people of Bitche. This blockade becomes even more severe by rain and snow. At the beginning of the month of November 1870, Adjutant Mondelli can escape Bitche to go to Tours and provide pay for the garrison. To alleviate the fate of the troops who camped in tents at the entrenched camp at the foot of Fort Saint-Sébastien, wagons were removed from the station and transferred to this camp to serve as shelters for the soldiers.

A rather strange situation takes hold in the besieged and particularly demolished city: at the request of the population supported by the creation of a defense committee, the gates of the city are open from 7 a.m. to 5 p.m., leaving almost a life "Normal" develop before the eyes of German observers. To support the morale of the garrison, Teyssier even organized a fanfare using musical instruments discovered in the boxes of the citadel store. When Warrant Officer Mondelli returned from Tours on November 18, 1871, many promotions are reported to the besieged. The reshuffle of the regiment is then made with the battalion of the besieged and the other troops in the city: the new 54th Infantry Regiment, with 10 companies of 160 men each, is created. In order to pay the garrison, Teyssier sent a request to the French consul in Neuchâtel in Switzerland. He thus obtained the sum of 50,000 francs at the end of November. It was at this time that 25 French officers left Bitche to join troops inside France, which left the city at the beginning of the month of December 1870 with 79 officers and civil servants, 2,800 soldiers, 2 officers and 160 soldiers in the sanitary shelters, and 1,347 civilians.

This global population of 4,334 people, although under siege, manages to live almost normally thanks to supplies from the surrounding villages. At the end of the month of January 1871, a newspaper reaches the besieged informing them of the surrender of Paris. Despite this news, the French flag continues to fly over the citadel. The armistice of January 28, 1871 does not modify the situation of the city.

A new German parliamentarian officially announces the conclusion of an armistice on February 1, 1871. However Teyssier rejects this news as being "worthless" for the bitchoise garrison. On February 5, 1871, two new parliamentarians bring a sealed envelope which contains the French copy of the treaty. Teyssier can see that Bitche became the victim of the differences of the two existing government authorities, one in Paris and the other in Bordeaux since she is simply forgotten. In the meantime, Mondelli, a newly appointed captain, was instructed by Teyssier to seek official instructions in Bordeaux where he arrived on February 17, 1871. Captain Mondelli then returned to Bitche with a letter from the French Minister of War.

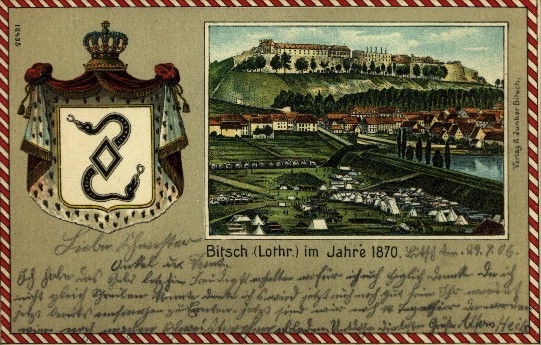
Bitche in 1870

On March 7, 1871, Commander Teyssier then exposes the situation to his troops and the inhabitants of the city. The evacuation of the French troops is decided. In the evening of March 9, 1871, a new German parliamentarian brings to Teyssier with another ultimatum sent by the Count of Bismarck-Bohlen and transmitted by Colonel Kohlermann who is the leader of the besiegers of Bitche. Teyssier refused any German directive and demanded instructions from the French government. He has already had pieces of 12 and 24 dismantled and transported from the citadel to the station in order to bring them back to France and to withdraw them from the Germans.

The March 9, 1871, the municipal council decides to make make and deliver to the defenders of the city a French flag with the inscription: "The City of Bitche to its defenders - August 8, 1870 - March 12, 1871". On March 11, 1871, a codicil concerning Bitche is signed in Ferrières in Seine-et-Marne, but the French government neglects to inform the city. On March 12, 1871, a German parliamentarian comes to present Commander Teyssier with a letter from Jules Favre in which he is ordered to evacuate Bitche with the honors of the war. Three days later, on March 15, 1871, a ceremony takes place at the entrenched camp: the flag made by the city is handed to Teyssier in front of the troops standing at attention and who march shortly after in front of the representatives of the municipality. On this same occasion, Commander Teyssier received a laurel wreath from a committee of ladies from Niederbronn.

In order to find the money necessary for the start-up of his troops and to remove the equipment from the citadel, Teyssier ordered the destruction of the powder that remained and had the doors, windows and iron gates of the drawbridge demolished and other works to sell the plant metallurgical of Niederbronn. It does the same with food surpluses. This brings him the sum of 100,000 vintage francs to carry out the imminent evacuation. Details thereof are discussed on March 22, 1871, between the delegates of Teyssier and Kohlermann in a house located beyond the railway line on the road to Strasbourg, but this interview ended in failure, with disagreement reigning over the modalities of the evacuation.

Colonel Kohlermann summons Teyssier: if the French garrison does not evacuate the city, it will be considered as "usurper of German territory". Large caliber pieces were brought by the Germans to Bitche to intimidate Teyssier and thus signify a possible resumption of the bombardments. The French government then telegraphed Teyssier to leave the city "with the honors of war". Stubborn, the latter rejects the term since there was no bitchoise capitulation. Teyssier claims that since March 11, 1871, he cannot be treated as a prisoner and that the Germans must recognize him "on a mission in Bitche". The Germans in fact demand the evacuation of the citadel without their weapons and the provision of Teyssier to the head of the German troops in Lemberg.

== Aftermath ==
The end of the talks would have concrete and unfortunate consequences when Mondelli again succeeded in contacting Gambetta in Bourges, which decided Teyssier to proceed with the evacuation of the city. Finally, the March 25, 1871, the armed garrison leaves the city taking the flag made by the inhabitants for the defenders of their city. Teyssier's troops left Bitche by the railroad: they passed through Haguenau, Saverne, Sarrebourg, Lunéville, Gray, Dijon, to join their new assignment in Nevers. As for Teyssier wasappointed lieutenant-colonel, he remains in Bitche for the official handover of the citadel, and didn't leave the city until April 3, 1871.

The March 26, 1871, the German troops enter Bitche by the Phalsbourg gate where Commander Teyssier hands over the keys of the place to Colonel Kohlermann. We must mention a very significant fact but very important to describe the state of mind of the people of Bitche at that time. The day before the German entry, the mayor of Bitche, Mr. Lamberton, had asked his fellow citizens not to boo the Germans for fear of reprisals. After having been French since 1766, the city of Bitche became German.

The human toll of the siege of the city is nineteen German dead who are buried in the cemeteries of Reyersviller, Schorbach and in a mass grave, the Bayerngrab, above Schorbach. The Bavarians must also have sixty-two wounded in their ranks. Four Bavarian soldiers were also killed and buried in Haspelschiedt. As for the French losses, the figures are not defined exactly: ninety-three French soldiers who died in town are buried next to the Chapelle de l'Étang in the garden of the Hospice Saint-Joseph. The victims killed at the citadel are not precisely known. The 86th Regiment of French Infantry (later transformed into 54th RI) who had occupied the citadel suffered twenty-one soldiers killed in ambulances or field hospitals. Moreover, the multitude of regiments representing the besieged troops Bitche account seventy-two other soldiers from the 17th, 27th, 30th, 46th, 68th, 84th, 88th and 96th Infantry Regiments, to the 9th and 16th battalions of foot at 1st regiment skirmish Algeria at 2nd regiment zouaves, the 1st engineering regiment, the 3rd and 5th regiments Hussards and Corps Excise. The French soldiers who fell on the citadel of Bitche are buried in the ditches of the citadel.

The civilian population had six deaths, a relatively low figure compared to the extent of the damage suffered. The military defense of Bitche by Commander Teyssier caused a sensation in French military circles, arousing considerable interest in military training to the point of being included for a long time in the study program of the École Supérieure de la Guerre.

== Legacy ==
In consideration for the heroic defense of Bitche, a place the 16th arrondissement of Paris was named "Place de Bitche". This name did not have the good fortune to please the United States consul after he had acquired a building intended to house the legation of his country. The government promptly yielded to its assiduous urges and hastened to rename it Place des États-Unis. As for the place de Bitche, an orphan of location like the city was of France, a decree of August 16, 1881, the relegated in the 19th arrondissement, in the old "place of the Church."

== Literature ==
- Didier Hemmert, Le Pays de Bitche, 1990.
- Francis Rittgen, Bitche et son canton, des origines à 1945, 1988.
- Bernard Robin, Les Grelots du vent, images et mirages du Pays de Bitche, 1984.
- Bernard Robin, Un sablier de brumes, 1989.
- Bernard Robin, Manteaux de grès et dentelles de sapin, 1992.
- André Schutz, Bitche et son pays, 1992.
