= Napoleonic medal =

Napoleonic medals are medals including those struck by the Paris Medal Mint celebrating the accomplishments of Napoleon, Emperor of the French. The exact number of these medals is not precisely known, since the official records of Napoleon's reign, including the list of medals struck by the mint, were erased by King Louis XVIII. Counting medals struck in England and Italy, the total number of different medals exceeds 2,000.

The sizes of these medals vary, although most are approximately 40mm in diameter. Many were struck in copper, although silver and gold were also used. The copper medals have a patina applied, which protects the copper from eroding and makes the medal look like bronze. A single copy of most of the medals was struck in gold for Napoleon's personal collection. Many of these gold medals were sold at auction from the personal collection of Victor Bonaparte.

The most definitive catalog of Napoleonic medals was created by a collector named Bramsen in three volumes published between 1904 and 1913. This catalog identifies more than 2300 medals, including medals struck by the Paris Mint and as well as medals from other countries related to Napoleon or his reign. The most common type, known as the St. Helena Medal, was issued to French grognards who rallied to Napoleon's cause during the Hundred Days.

There are at least 26 known volumes of The Napoleon Medals by Edward Edwards. Most copies are in Museums but some are held in private hands. It is a complete series of the medals struck in France, Italy, Great Britain and Germany, from the commencement of the French Republic in 1804 to the restoration in 1815. The books were printed in (M.DCCC.XXXV11) (1837) by Henry Hering, London.

Many of the medals struck during Napoleon's reign were restruck later from the same dies. Determining when a given medal was struck is sometimes difficult. Restrikes can often be identified by a punch mark applied to the edge of the medal, which is usually denoted by the word 'BRONZE'.
