= Jean-Joseph Charlier =

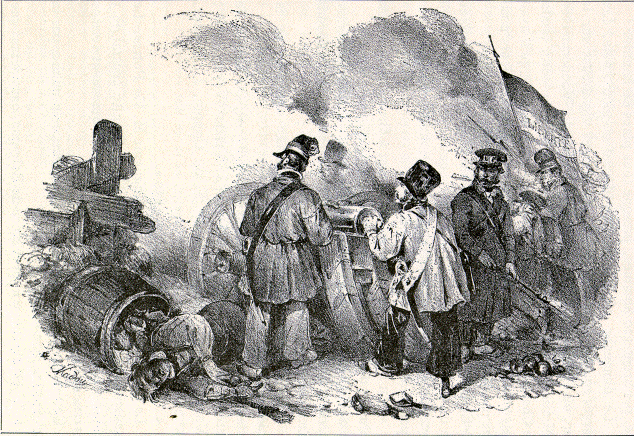
- Jambe de Bois, depicted during the fighting in Brussels in September 1830 in a lithograph by Jean-Baptiste Madou, aiming one of the revolutionaries' cannons.
- Born: 15 April 1794; Liège, Prince-Bishopric of Liège
- Died: 31 March 1866 (aged 71); Liège, Belgium
- Military career
- Allegiance: (France) French Empire; Belgium
- Service years: 1813–1831
- Awards: Iron Cross; Order of Leopold; Saint Helena Medal

Jean-Joseph Charlier (15 April 1794 – 30 March 1886) was a Belgian artisan and revolutionary who became an iconic figure in the Belgian Revolution. His participation as an amputee in the fighting near Brussels Park during the Dutch attack on Brussels in September 1830 was widely praised, and he gained the nickname Wooden Leg (French: Jambe de Bois).

== Biography ==
Charlier was born in Liège on 15 April 1794. He worked as a weaver before enlisting in the French Grande Armée and served as an artilleryman. He is believed to have been wounded at the Battle of Waterloo in 1815 and had one of his legs was amputated. He subsequently lived with a wooden pegleg.

After the outbreak of the Belgian Revolution on 25 August 1830, Charlier was among the 250 volunteers from Liège who left on 3 September to defend Brussels against an attack by a Dutch Army under Prince Frederick. He participated in fighting during the so-called September Days (Journées de séptembre) from 23 to 26 September 1830 near the Brussels Park at the Montagne de la cour where he commanded the two cannons available to the revolutionaries.

His role in the fighting was widely commemorated by subsequent writers and he became emblematic of the revolutionaries who had participated in the September Days after Belgian independence in 1831. He died at Liège on 31 March 1866.

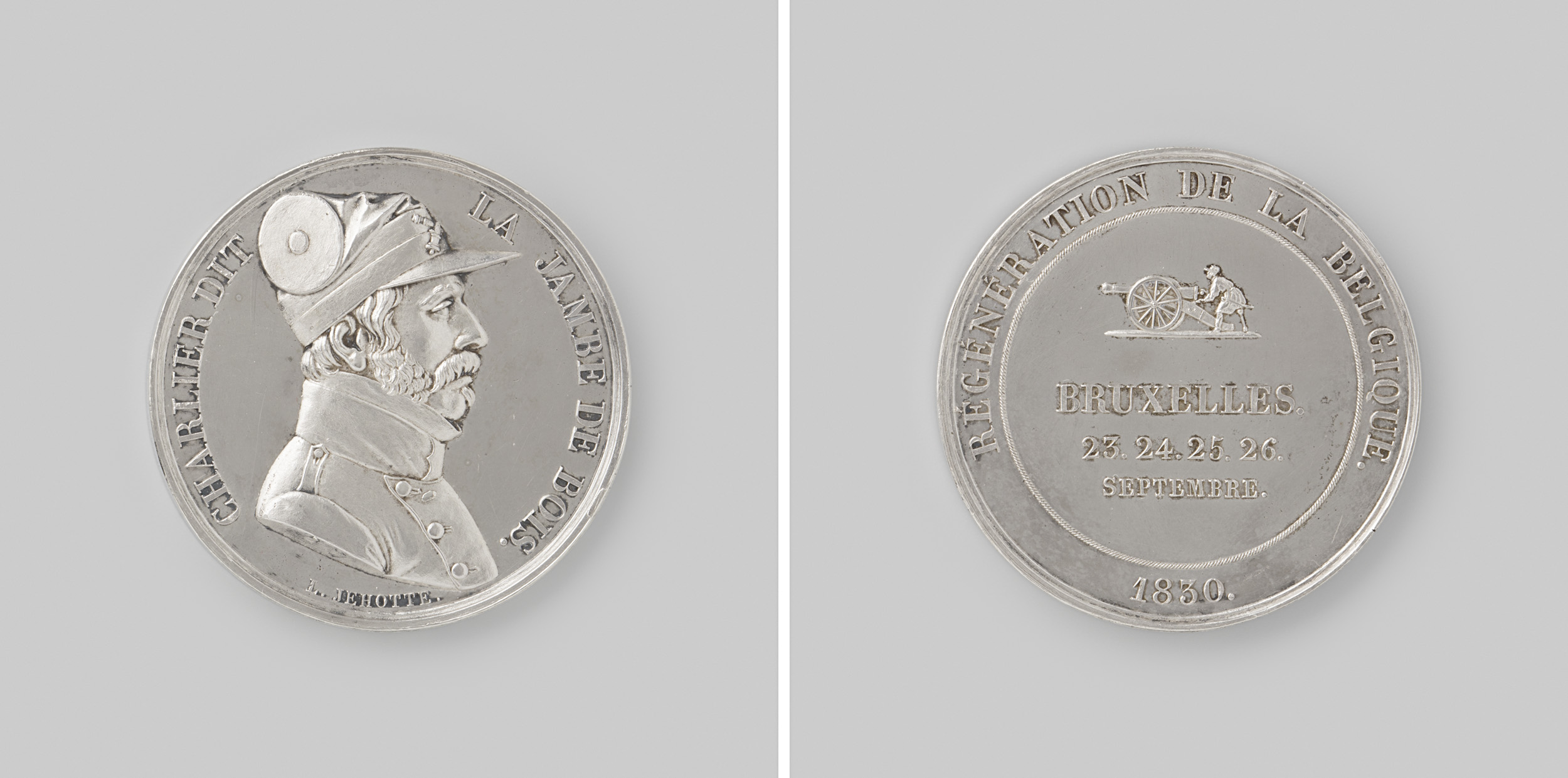
Commemorative medal issued in Charlier's honour at Liège in 1830, now in the collection of the Rijksmuseum.
