= Saint Helena Medal =

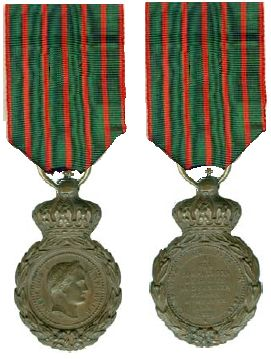
- Obverse and reverse of the medal
- Type: Campaign medal
- Awarded for: Military service for France from 1792 to 1815
- Presented by: Second French Empire
- Eligibility: French and foreign soldiers
- Campaigns: French Revolutionary Wars, Napoleonic Wars
- Status: No longer awarded
- Established: 12 August 1857
- Final award: 1870

Highlights
- Total: ~305,000 to Frenchmen; ~55,000 to foreigners
- Ribbon bar of the medal

Precedence
- Next (higher): Medal of the Nation's Gratitude
- Next (lower): Commemorative medal of the 1859 Italian Campaign

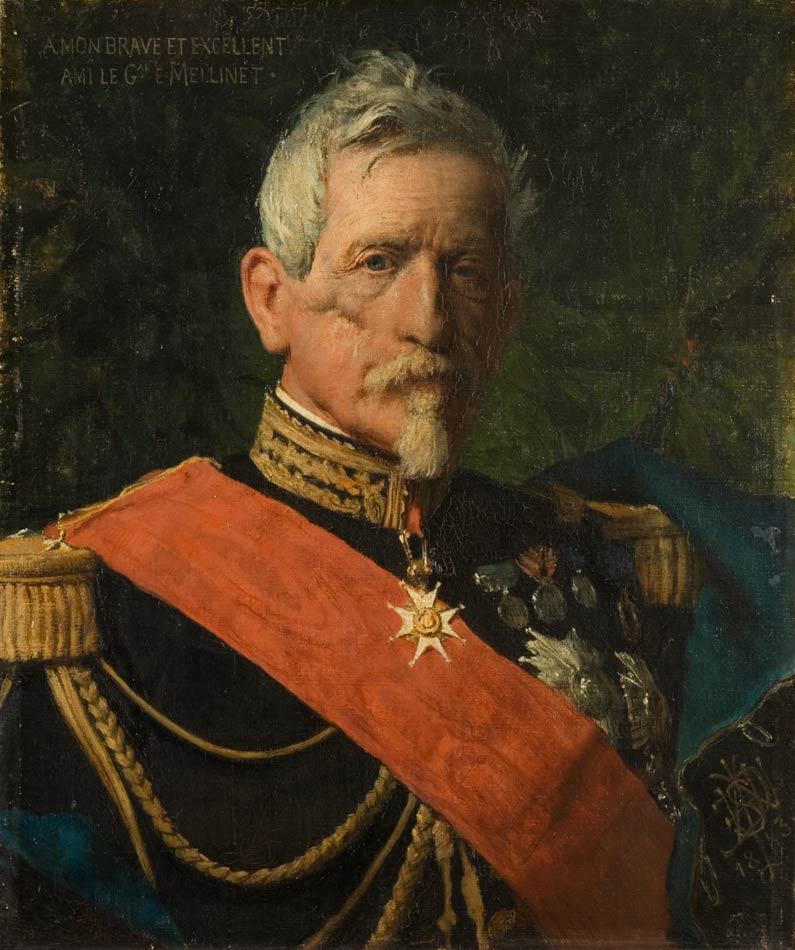
General Émile Mellinet, a recipient of the Saint Helena Medal

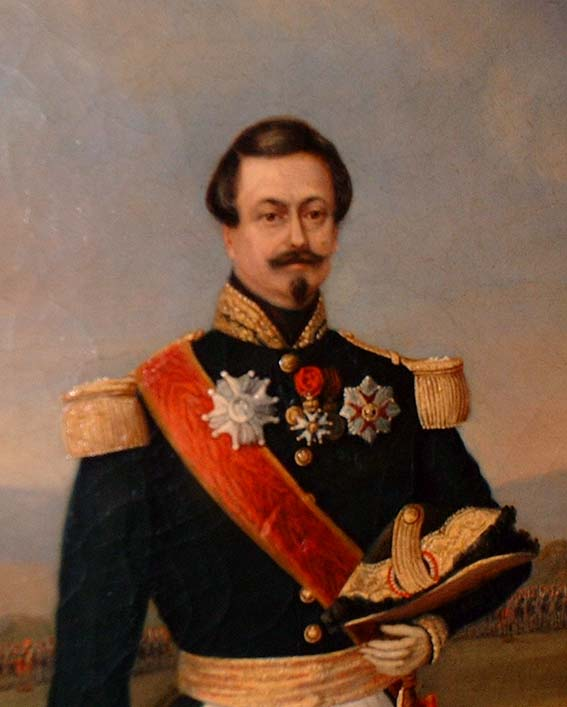
General Émile Perrodon, a recipient of the Saint Helena Medal

Captain Amédée de Bast, a recipient of the Saint Helena Medal

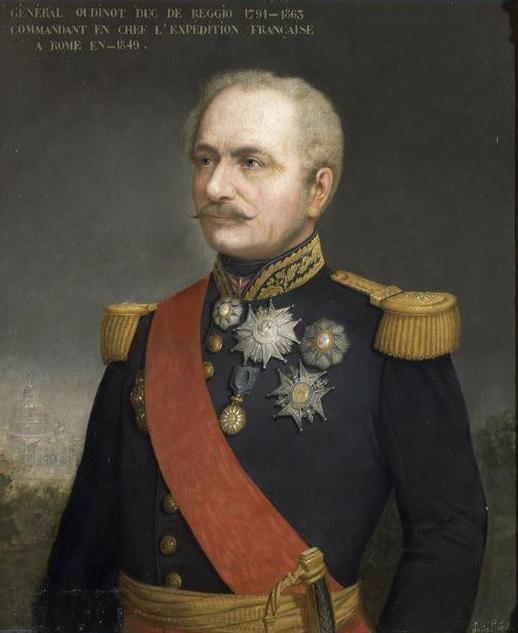
General Charles Oudinot, a recipient of the Saint Helena Medal

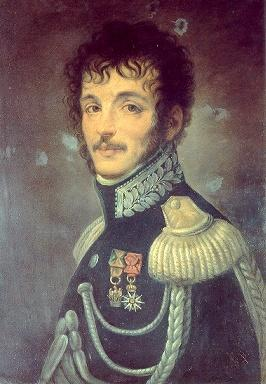
General Teodoro Lechi, a recipient of the Saint Helena Medal

The Saint Helena Medal (French: Médaille de Sainte-Hélène) was the first French campaign medal. It was established in 1857 by a decree of emperor Napoleon III to recognise participation in the campaigns led by emperor Napoleon I.

Emperor Napoléon I, creator of the Order of the Legion of Honour and various other orders, never instituted commemorative campaign medals for his soldiers. In time, many veterans of these campaigns, sometimes called the "débris de la Grande Armée" (English: "remnants of the Great Army"), began meeting within various new veterans' associations. Keeping alive their war memories and the myth of Napoléon in popular culture, they issued many unofficial commemorative and associative medals.

It would be forty two years after the last battles and exile of the emperor to the island of Saint Helena before the need to adequately and officially recognise the service of these combat veterans was eventually recognised officially by an imperial decree of Emperor Napoléon III creating, on 12 August 1857, the Saint Helena Medal. According to Fondation Napoléon 450,000 old soldiers were recorded as being alive, in the 1850s.

== Award statute ==
The Saint Helena Medal was awarded to all French and foreign soldiers, from the land armies or naval fleets, who served the Republic or the Empire between the years 1792 and 1815 inclusive.

The medal was awarded with no condition of minimum time of service or participation in a particular military campaign; it was, however, necessary to prove one's right to the medal with a record of service or leave record.

A later decree of 16 April 1864 added the Saint Helena Medal to the list of awards that could be revoked following a condemnation to a fixed prison term of one year or more for a crime committed by the recipient.

The Saint Helena Medal was accompanied by an award certificate from the Grand Chancery of the Legion of Honour and came in a white cardboard box with intricate ornamentation on the lid in the form of an embossed imperial eagle over the inscription on seven lines "AUX COMPAGNONS DE GLOIRE DE NAPOLÉON I DÉCRET IMPÉRIAL DU 12 AOÛT 1857" (English: "TO NAPOLÉON I COMPANIONS IN GLORY IMPERIAL DECREE OF 12 AUGUST 1857").

== Award description ==
The Saint Helena Medal is of irregular shape and struck from bronze. It is a 2 cm in diameter circular medallion surrounded by a 50mm wide laurel wreath tied with a bow at the bottom. Atop the medal, a 2 cm wide Imperial Crown. The obverse of the medallion bears the relief image of the right profile of Emperor Napoleon I surrounded by the relief inscription "NAPOLÉON I EMPEREUR" (English: "NAPOLÉON I EMPEROR"). A ring or small orbs separates the central medallion from the wreath. Just below the image of the emperor, a small anchor, the privy mark of the award's designer, Désiré-Albert Barre.

The reverse is identical except for the medallion which bears the relief circular inscription within a narrow 20mm band "CAMPAGNES DE 1792 A 1815" (English: "CAMPAIGNS OF 1792 TO 1815"). In the centre, the relief inscription on nine lines "A" "SES" "COMPAGNONS" "DE GLOIRE" "SA DERNIÈRE" "PENSÉE" "STE HÉLÈNE" "5 MAI" "1821" (English: "TO HIS COMPANIONS IN GLORY HIS LAST THOUGHT ST HELENA 5 MAY 1821").

The medal should hang from a 38mm wide green silk moiré ribbon bearing five 1,8mm wide red vertical stripes spaced 4,5mm apart and 1mm red edge stripes. The ribbon passes through a suspension ring, itself passing through a lateral hole in the imperial crown's orb atop the medal.

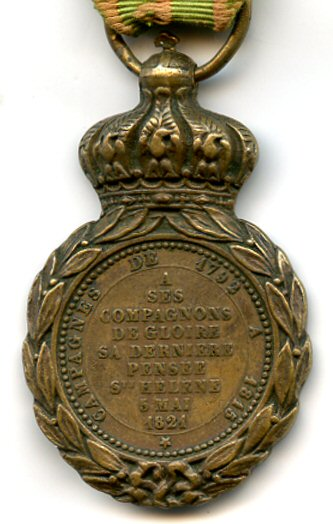
Reverse of the St Helena medal.

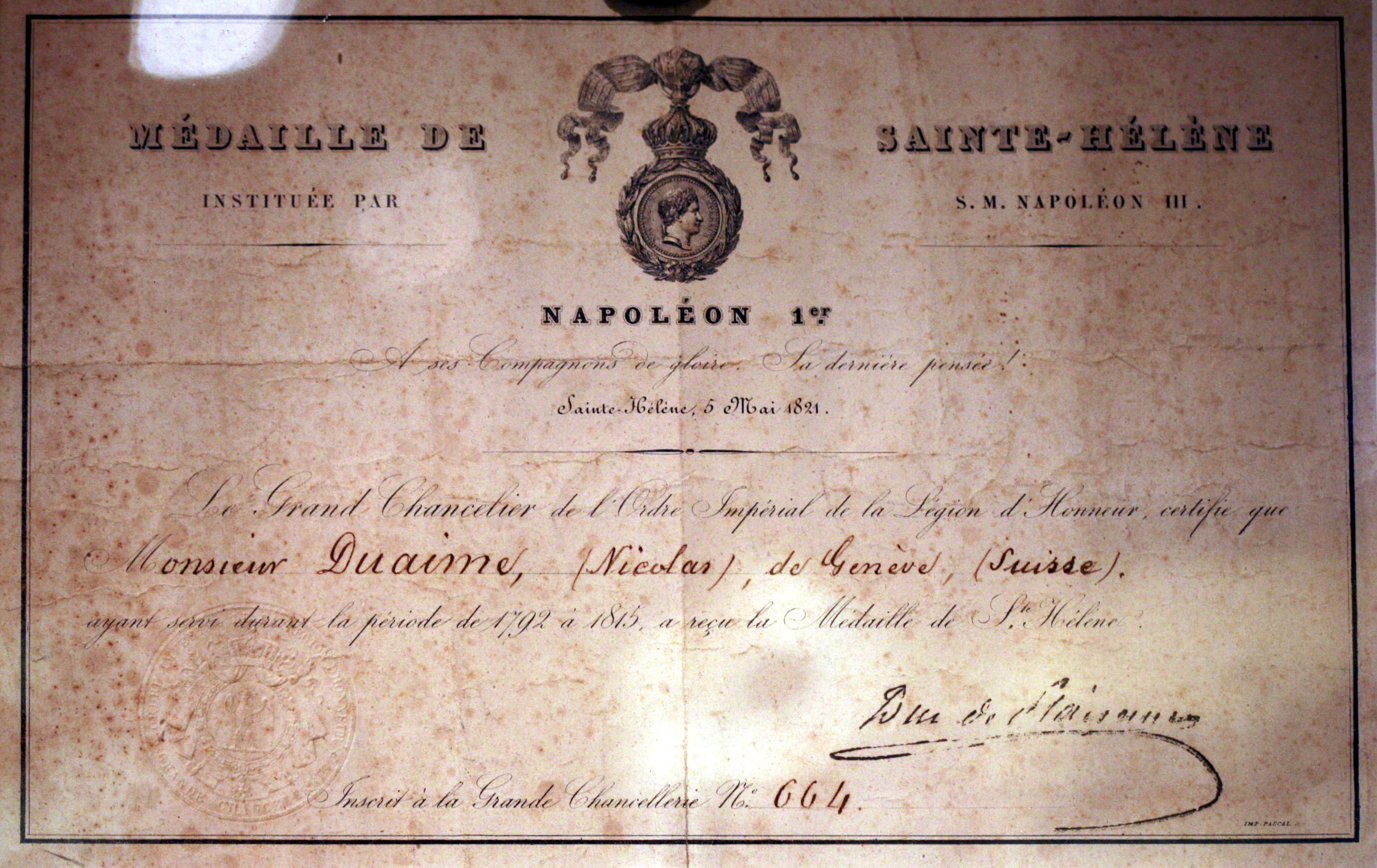
Award certificate.

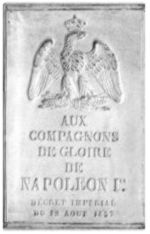
Presentation box cover

Emblem of the Imperial Great Army

Emperor Napoléon I

== Notable recipients (partial list) ==
=== Military ===
- Marshal of France Jean-Baptiste Philibert Vaillant
- Marshal of France Bernard Pierre Magnan
- Marshal of France Aimable Pélissier
- Admiral Ferdinand-Alphonse Hamelin
- General Mathieu Brialmont
- Engineer general Jacques, comte Mallet
- General Émile Herbillon
- General Aristide de La Ruë
- General Charles Oudinot
- General Teodoro Lechi
- General François Martineau des Chesnez
- General Anne Charles Lebrun
- General Émile Mellinet
- General Casimir-Louis-Victurnien de Rochechouart de Mortemart
- General Albert Joseph Goblet d'Alviella
- General Vivant-Jean Brunet-Denon
- General Tomasz Łubieński
- General Pierre Schaken
- General Émile Perrodon
- General Pierre Chrétien Korte
- General Jean-Ernest Ducos de La Hitte
- Vice admiral Odet-Pellion
- Rear admiral Louis Tromelin
- Colonel Louis Auguste de Bourbel de Montpinçon
- Commander Joseph Toussaint Bernard
- Major Étienne Desjoyeaux
- Captain Jean-Joseph Charlier
- Captain Amédée de Bast
- Captain Claude Noisot
- Lieutant Jean-Marie Teyssier father of Lieutenant colonel Louis-Casimir Teyssier
- Imperial Guard Officer Martin Marie Benard

=== Civilian ===
- Doctor François-Joseph Cazin
- Pierre François Dumont (1789–1864), French industrialist
- Marcellin Jobard
- Nicolas Savin

== See also ==
- French Imperial Eagle
- Grande Armée Slang
- List of French general officers (Peninsular War)
- Types of military forces in the Napoleonic Wars
- Uniforms of La Grande Armée
