= Haspelschiedt =

- Commune
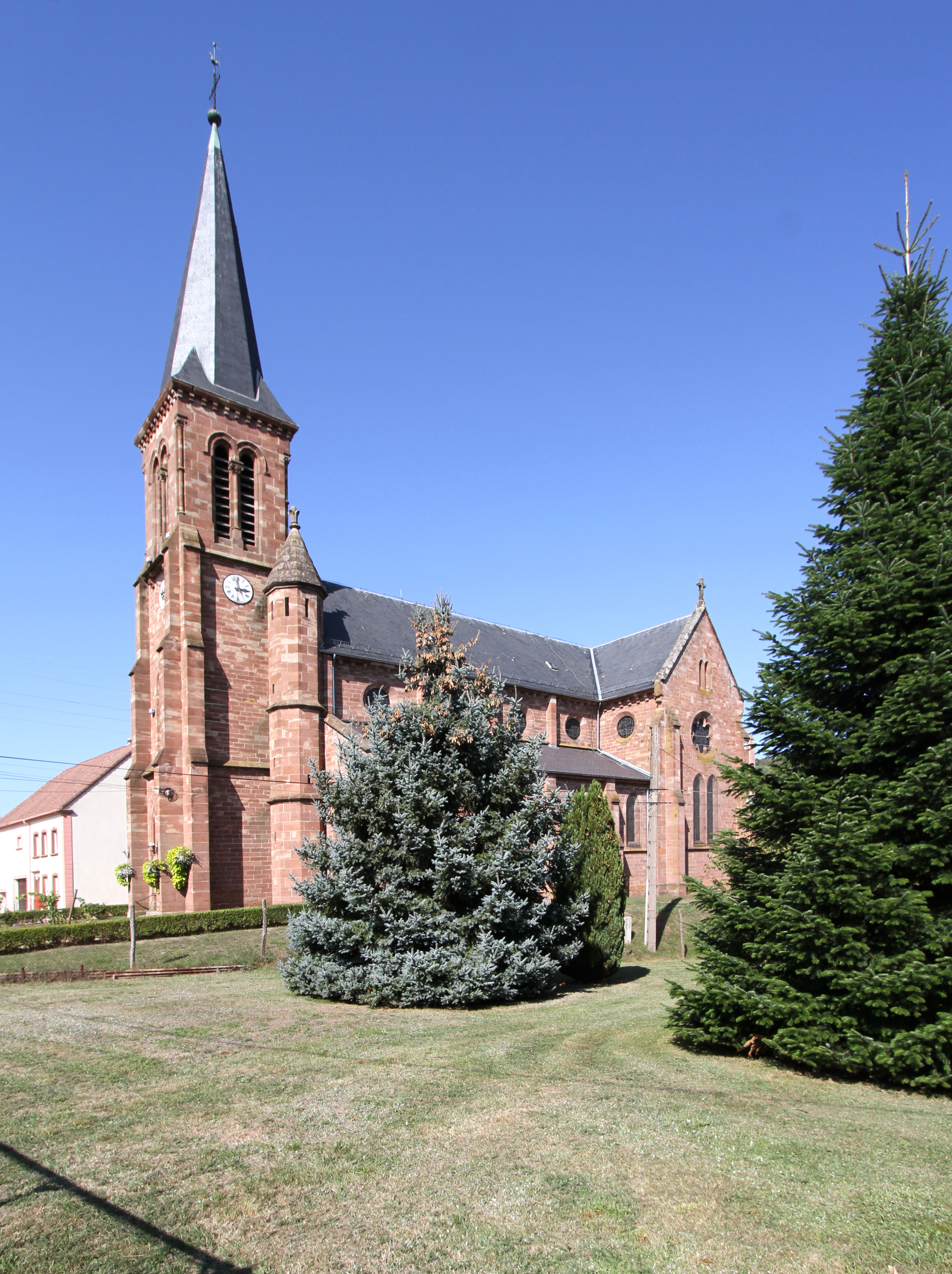
- Church of Saint Nicholas in Haspelschiedt

- Coat of arms
- Location of Haspelschiedt
- Location within France Location within Grand Est
- Coordinates: 49°05′12″N 7°29′11″E
- Country: France
- Region: Grand Est
- Department: Moselle
- Arrondissement: Sarreguemines
- Canton: Bitche
- Intercommunality: CC du Pays de Bitche

Government
  - Mayor (2020–2026): Sébastien Seel
- Area^{1}: 25.2 km^{2} (9.7 sq mi)
- Elevation: 291 m (955 ft)
- Highest elevation: 404 m (1,325 ft)
- Lowest elevation: 257 m (843 ft)
- Population (2023): 281
  - Density: 11.2/km^{2} (28.9/sq mi)
- Time zone: UTC+01:00 (CET)
  - Summer (DST): UTC+02:00 (CEST)
- INSEE/Postal code: 57301 /57230
- ^{1} French Land Register data, which excludes lakes, ponds, glaciers > 1 km^{2} (0.386 sq mi or 247 acres) and river estuaries.

Haspelschiedt (French pronunciation: [aspəlʃit]; German: Haspelscheidt; Lorraine Franconian: Haschbelschitt) is a commune in the Moselle department of the Grand Est administrative region in north-eastern France. The population in 2018 was 301 inhabitants.

== Geography ==
The municipality of Haspelschiedt is located in the far northeast of Lorraine, northeast of Bitche and near the border with the German state of Rhineland-Palatinate. It is crossed by the Schwartzenbach River. The area belongs to the Pays de Bitche region and is within the Northern Vosges Regional Nature Park.

To the southwest of the village is a hill called the Schlossberg that contains prehistoric ruins, a stele, and polisher grooves.

== History ==
Haspelschiedt was the site of a battle between the Duke of Lorraine and the Bishop of Metz at the end of the thirteenth century. The village's name was first recorded in 1544 as Haspelschid, from the Old German Aspel-Scheide meaning a forest of aspen trees, and the name would evolve into Haspelschille by 1793 and Haspelschitt by 1801.

The area was annexed by Germany following the Franco-Prussian War, and returned to France after World War I. The residents were evacuated twice during World War II, and a German military camp operated nearby until the village was liberated by American troops on 17 March 1945.

The village is centered around the Church of Saint Nicholas, built from 1869 to 1874 with pink sandstone from a nearby quarry. The church's bells were melted down during World War I, but replaced in 1922. The building was severely damaged during World War II and restored from 1947 to 1953, with a new set of bells installed in 1950.

== See also ==
- Communes of the Moselle department
