= Monnaie de Paris =

Mint of France

Coordinates: 48°51′24″N 2°20′21″E

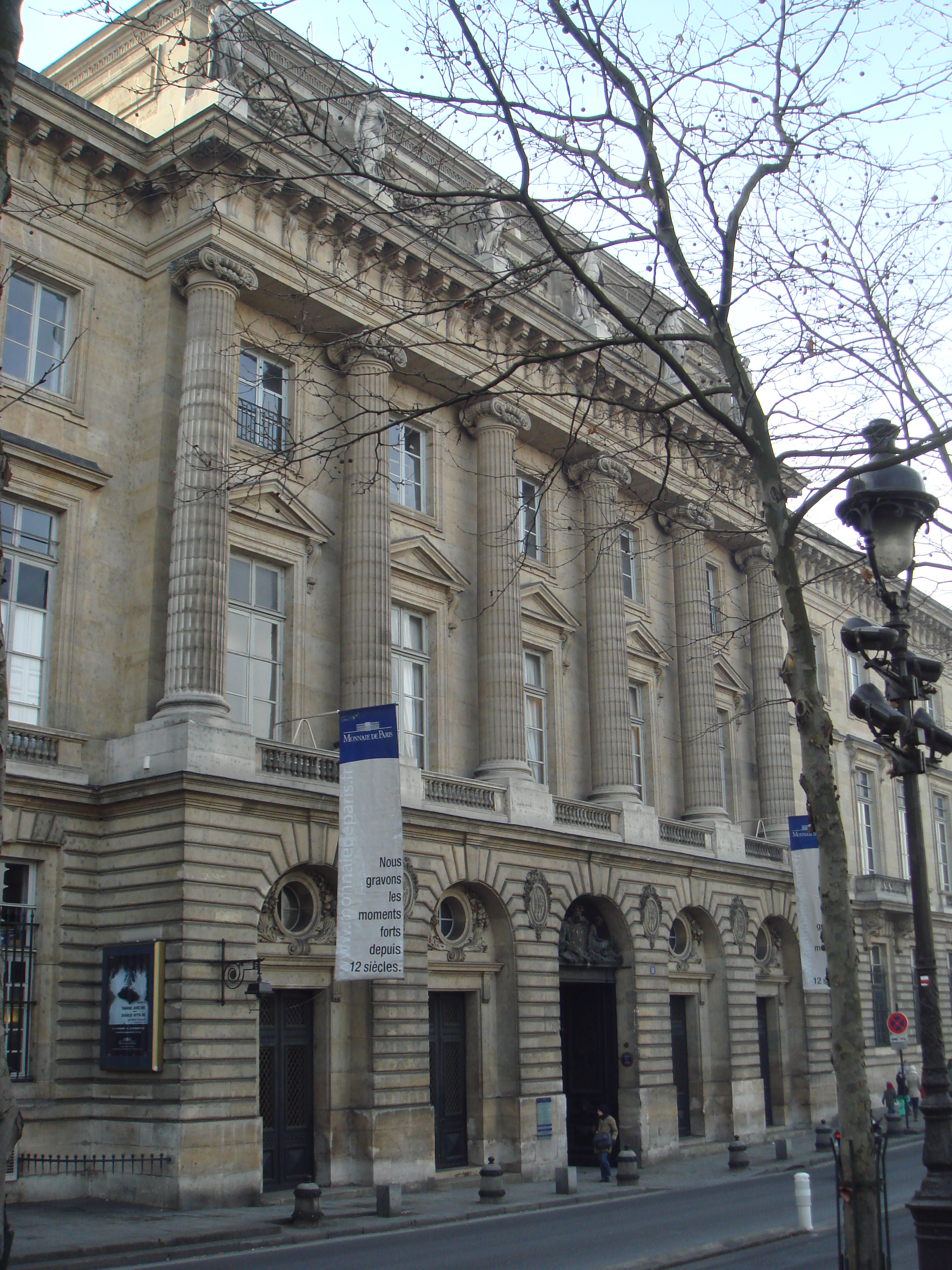
- Monnaie de Paris, 11 quai Conti, 75006 Paris
- Type: EPIC
- Industry: Coin and medal production
- Founded: 25 June 864; 1162 years ago
- Headquarters: Paris & Pessac, France
- Area served: France; European Union
- Key people: Marc Schwartz (Chief Executive)
- Products: Coins; Medals
- Owner: French state
- Number of employees: 500
- Website: www.monnaiedeparis.fr

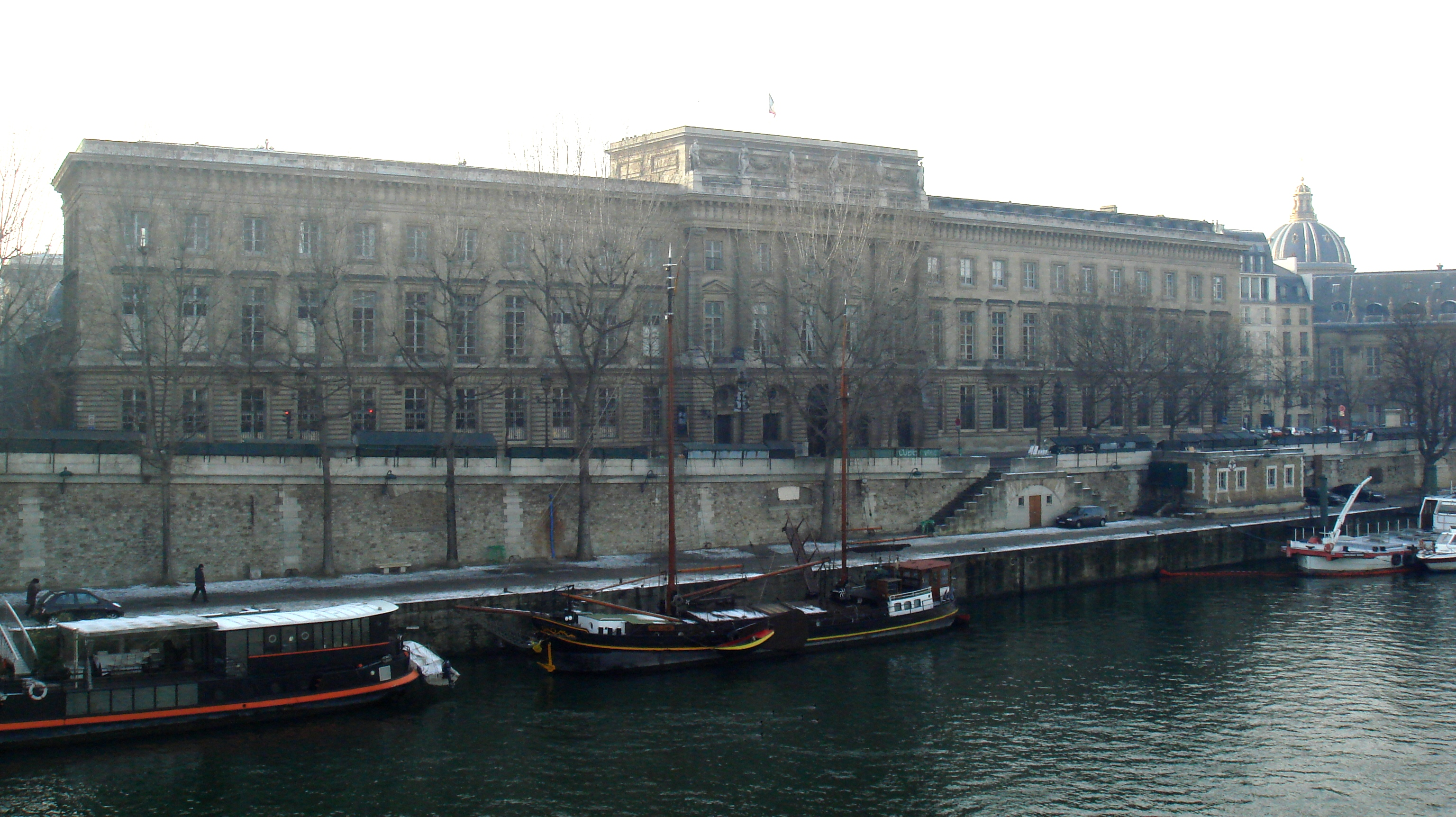
The full façade of the Monnaie de Paris, seen from Île de la Cité. The dome on the right is that of the Institut de France.

The Monnaie de Paris (French pronunciation: [mɔnɛ də paʁi], Paris Mint) is a government-owned institution responsible for producing France's coins. Founded in AD 864 by King Charles the Bald with the Edict of Pistres, it is the oldest continuously running minting institution and one of the oldest extant companies in the world.

== History ==
In 1973, the mint relocated its primary production to a facility in Pessac. Since then, the original facility in Paris functions primarily as a museum and is home to a collection of many ancient coins.

Monnaie de Paris acquired its autonomy and was granted legal personality by law no. 2006–1666 in 2007.

In February 2012, it was the first public institution to obtain the Living Heritage Company label.

On September 30, 2017, the Monnaie de Paris reopened its doors after renovation work.

== Building in Paris ==
A Neoclassical edifice, the Hôtel de la Monnaie was designed by Jacques-Denis Antoine and built from 1767–1775 on the Left Bank of the Seine. The Monnaie was the first major civic monument undertaken by Antoine, yet shows a high level of ingenuity on the part of the architect. Today it is considered a key example of French Neoclassicism in pre-Revolutionary Paris. The building is typified by its heavy external rustication and severe decorative treatment. It boasts one of the longest façades on the Seine; its appearance has been likened to the Italian palazzo tradition. The building, which housed mint workshops, administrative rooms, and residential quarters, wraps around a large interior courtyard. It remains open to the public and includes a numismatics museum, located within what was once the main foundry.

== Development ==
The Monnaie de Paris employs 500 people (in 2010) on two sites: the Hôtel de la Monnaie in Paris (55% of the workforce) and the monetary establishment in Pessac, in Gironde (45%). In 2019, turnover amounted to 134 million euros for a workforce of 489 employees.

Following a 5-year renovation project known as Metalmetamorphose, the museum at the Monnaie de Paris – known as the Musée du Conti (11 Conti Museum) – was reopened on 30 September 2017.

== See also ==
- List of museums in Paris
- Napoleonic medal
- Philippe Danfrie – Superintendent of the Mint in the late 16th century.
- Pierre Marie François Ogé Bust of Jacques Denis Antoine
- List of oldest companies
