= Bramsen =

Bramsen is a surname. Notable people with the surname include:

- Jane F. Bramsen (born 1978), Danish badminton player
- Maria Bramsen (born 1963), Danish singer, graphic designer, and illustrator
- Trine Bramsen (born 1981), Danish politician
