= Lengelsheim =

- Commune
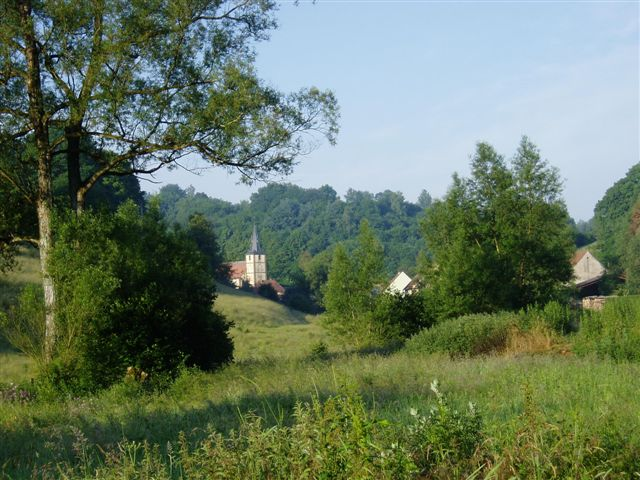
- A general view of Lengelsheim

- Coat of arms
- Location of Lengelsheim
- Location within France Location within Grand Est
- Coordinates: 49°06′34″N 7°24′33″E
- Country: France
- Region: Grand Est
- Department: Moselle
- Arrondissement: Sarreguemines
- Canton: Bitche
- Intercommunality: CC du Pays de Bitche

Government
  - Mayor (2020–2026): Michel Behr
- Area^{1}: 5.3 km^{2} (2.0 sq mi)
- Elevation: 260 m (850 ft)
- Highest elevation: 388 m (1,273 ft)
- Lowest elevation: 265 m (869 ft)
- Population (2023): 186
  - Density: 35/km^{2} (91/sq mi)
- Time zone: UTC+01:00 (CET)
  - Summer (DST): UTC+02:00 (CEST)
- INSEE/Postal code: 57393 /57720
- ^{1} French Land Register data, which excludes lakes, ponds, glaciers > 1 km^{2} (0.386 sq mi or 247 acres) and river estuaries.

Lengelsheim (French pronunciation: [lɛŋ(ɡ)əlsaim]; Lorraine Franconian: Lengelse) is a commune in the Moselle department of the Grand Est administrative region in north-eastern France.

The village belongs to the Pays de Bitche and to the Northern Vosges Regional Nature Park.

== See also ==
- Communes of the Moselle department
