= Éguelshardt =

- Commune
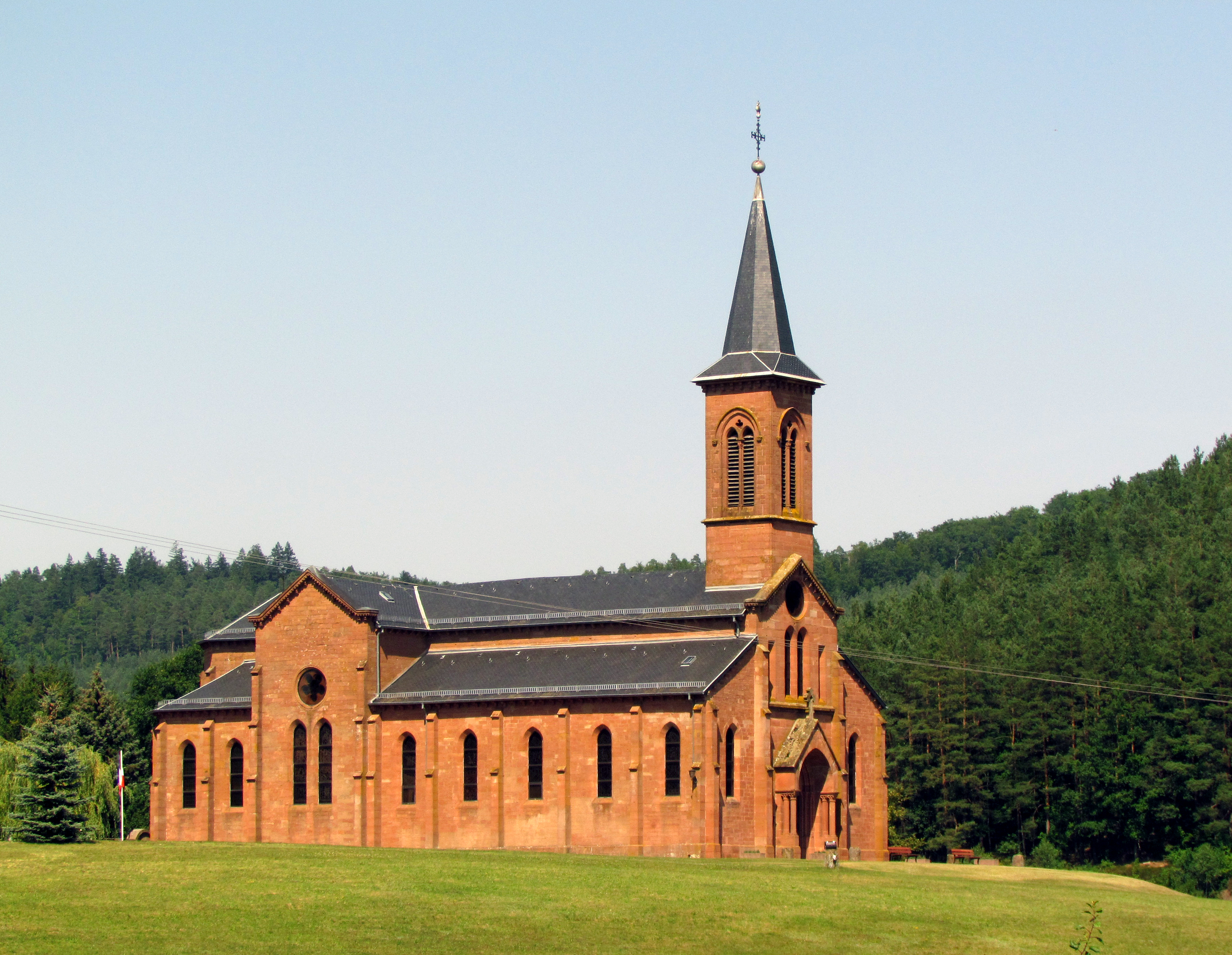
- The church in Éguelshardt

- Coat of arms
- Location of Éguelshardt
- Location within France Location within Grand Est
- Coordinates: 49°01′10″N 7°29′33″E
- Country: France
- Region: Grand Est
- Department: Moselle
- Arrondissement: Sarreguemines
- Canton: Bitche
- Intercommunality: CC du Pays de Bitche

Government
  - Mayor (2020–2026): Jean-Louis Eibel
- Area^{1}: 16.8 km^{2} (6.5 sq mi)
- Elevation: 240 m (790 ft)
- Highest elevation: 400 m (1,300 ft)
- Lowest elevation: 234 m (768 ft)
- Population (2023): 440
  - Density: 26/km^{2} (68/sq mi)
- Time zone: UTC+01:00 (CET)
  - Summer (DST): UTC+02:00 (CEST)
- INSEE/Postal code: 57188 /57230
- ^{1} French Land Register data, which excludes lakes, ponds, glaciers > 1 km^{2} (0.386 sq mi or 247 acres) and river estuaries.

Éguelshardt (French pronunciation: [eɡəlsaʁt]; German: Egelshardt; Lorraine Franconian: Egelshat) is a commune in the Moselle department of the Grand Est administrative region in north-eastern France.

The village belongs to the Pays de Bitche and to the Northern Vosges Regional Nature Park.

== See also ==
- Communes of the Moselle department
