= Louis-Casimir Teyssier =

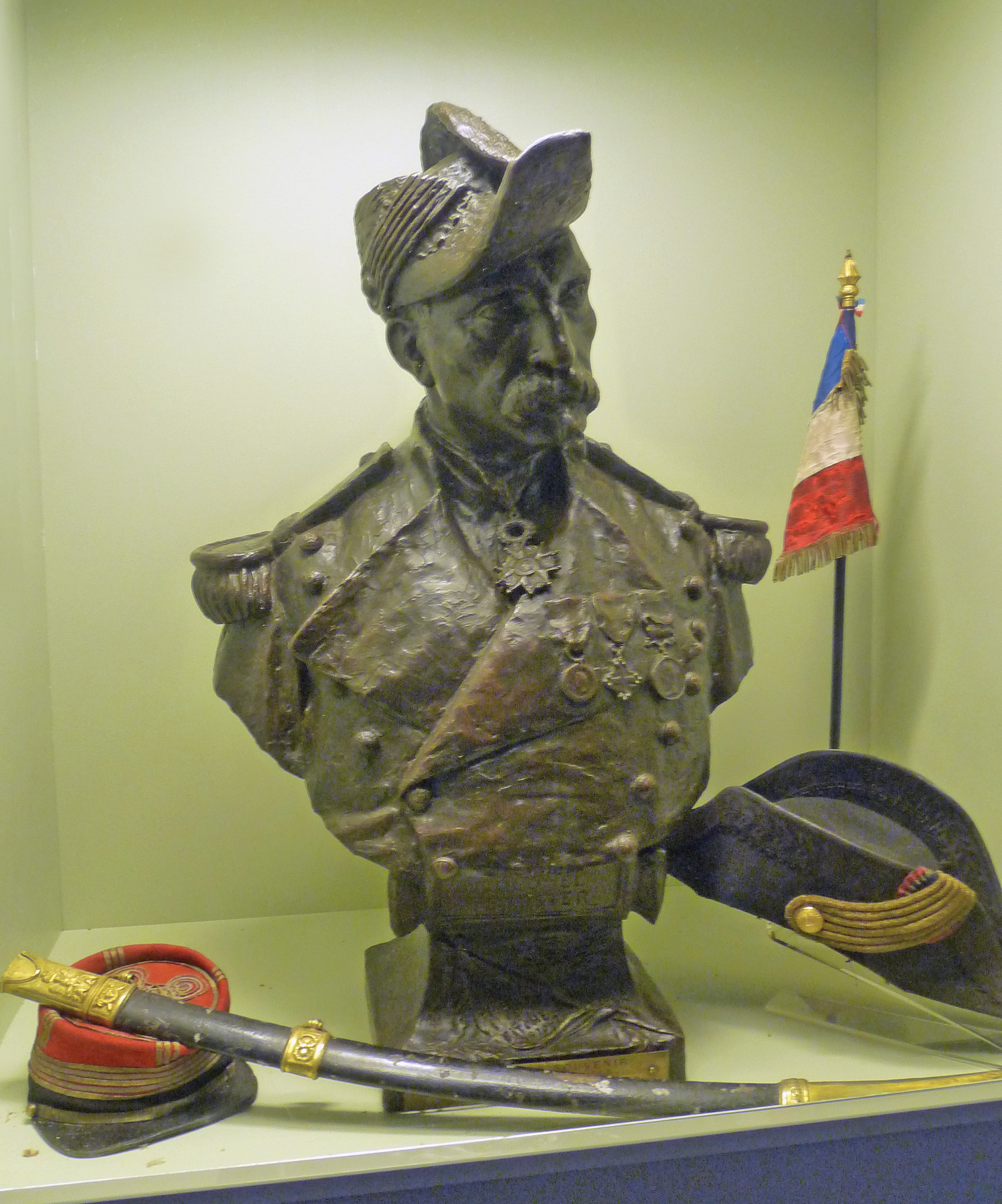
Based on the model by Gabriel Puech, 1854-1930 of Lieutenant-Colonel Teyssier in full uniform

Louis-Casimir Teyssier (1821 in Albi – 1916 at Albi) was a French commander.

== Life ==
He was recruited to the 21st regiment. As a lieutenant, he was wounded in Crimea, near Sevastopol and made a prisoner. He was released in December 15, 1855. made prisoner of war there he returned to France December 15, 1855. Serving in the 98th Regiment of the Line he was again wounded at Montebello, Italy in 1859. Afterwards he commanded a battalion of the 78th regiment of the line and in 1870 he was appointed commander of the fortress of Bitche. During the Franco-Prussian War of 1870-71 he defended the fortress with 3,000 men against about 20,000 Prussian and Bavarian soldiers until the French government ordered him to surrender after the cease fire in 1871. The German troops allowed the French troops to leave Bitche fully armed in acknowledgement of their bravery. He became commander of Marseille in May 1871 and Vicennes in 1872 as colonel.

== Decorations and honors ==
- Commander Légion d'honneur
- Saint Helena Medal
- Medal of Cécile Mulequiès
- British Crimea Medal
- Italian Campaign medal
- Order of Saints Maurice and Lazarus (Sardinia)
- Order of Ernst August awarded 1873 (Hannover)

The city of Albi erected a monument in his honor and named streets after him, while the city of Bitche named a street and its public general high school, Lycée Teyssier, after him.
