= Sturzelbronn =

- Commune
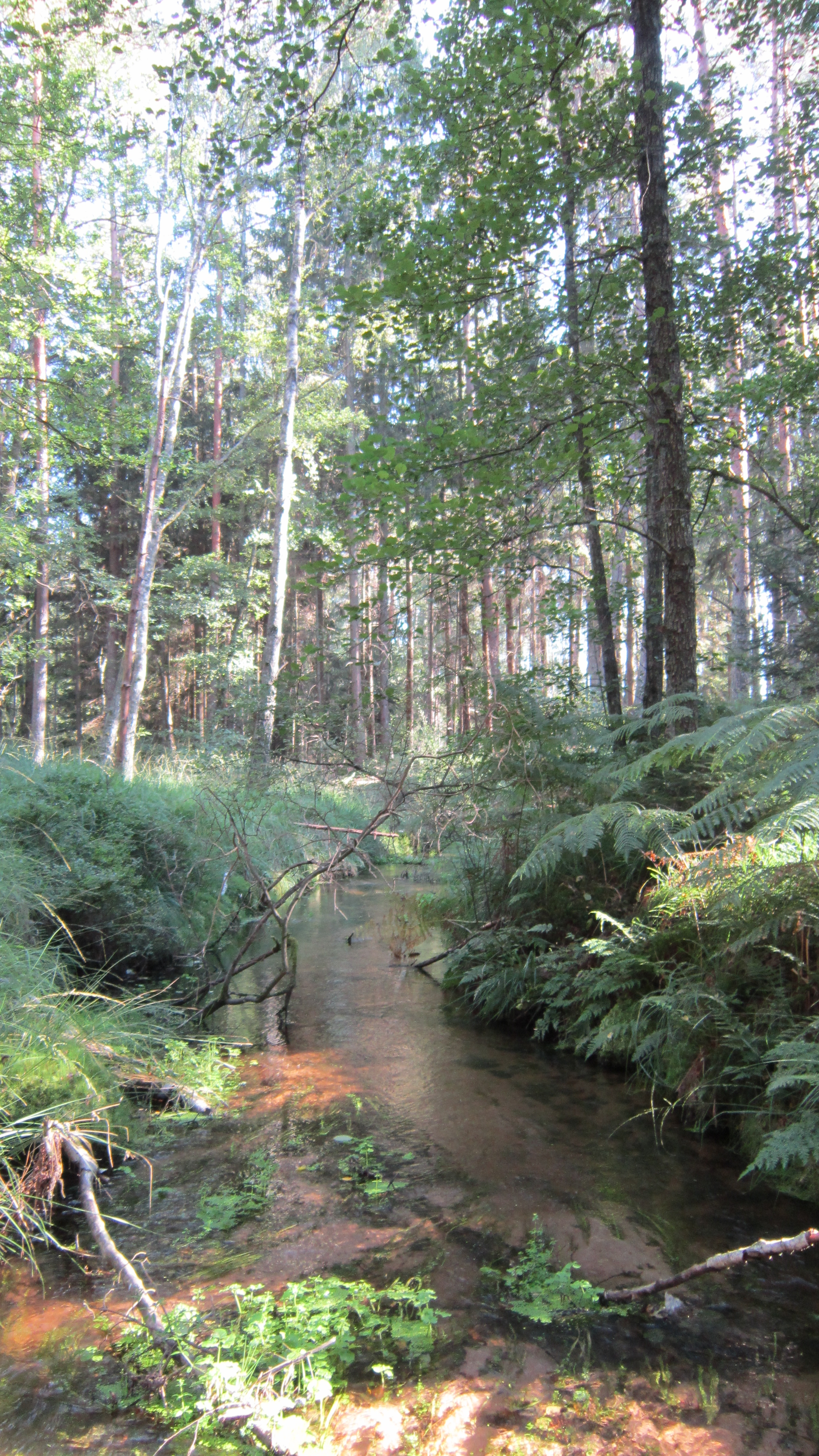
- Woodland in Sturzelbronn

- Coat of arms
- Location of Sturzelbronn
- Location within France Location within Grand Est
- Coordinates: 49°03′27″N 7°35′12″E
- Country: France
- Region: Grand Est
- Department: Moselle
- Arrondissement: Sarreguemines
- Canton: Bitche
- Intercommunality: CC du Pays de Bitche

Government
  - Mayor (2020–2026): Guillaume Krause
- Area^{1}: 32.51 km^{2} (12.55 sq mi)
- Elevation: 250 m (820 ft)
- Highest elevation: 454 m (1,490 ft)
- Lowest elevation: 228 m (748 ft)
- Population (2023): 168
  - Density: 5.17/km^{2} (13.4/sq mi)
- Time zone: UTC+01:00 (CET)
  - Summer (DST): UTC+02:00 (CEST)
- INSEE/Postal code: 57661 /57230
- ^{1} French Land Register data, which excludes lakes, ponds, glaciers > 1 km^{2} (0.386 sq mi or 247 acres) and river estuaries.

Sturzelbronn (French pronunciation: [ʃtyʁtsəlbʁɔn]; German: Stürzelbronn; Lorraine Franconian: Stirzelbrunn) is a commune in the Moselle department of the Grand Est administrative region in north-eastern France.

The village belongs to the Pays de Bitche and to the Northern Vosges Regional Nature Park.

== See also ==
- Communes of the Moselle department
