= Reyersviller =

- Commune
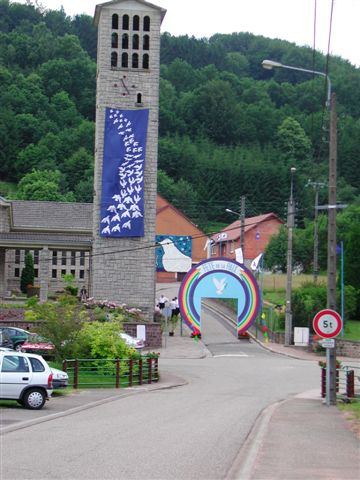
- The church in Reyersviller

- Coat of arms
- Location of Reyersviller
- Location within France Location within Grand Est
- Coordinates: 49°02′32″N 7°23′44″E
- Country: France
- Region: Grand Est
- Department: Moselle
- Arrondissement: Sarreguemines
- Canton: Bitche
- Intercommunality: CC du Pays de Bitche

Government
  - Mayor (2020–2026): Joëlle Wey
- Area^{1}: 8.32 km^{2} (3.21 sq mi)
- Elevation: 274 m (899 ft)
- Highest elevation: 428 m (1,404 ft)
- Lowest elevation: 266 m (873 ft)
- Population (2023): 380
  - Density: 46/km^{2} (120/sq mi)
- Time zone: UTC+01:00 (CET)
  - Summer (DST): UTC+02:00 (CEST)
- INSEE/Postal code: 57577 /57230
- ^{1} French Land Register data, which excludes lakes, ponds, glaciers > 1 km^{2} (0.386 sq mi or 247 acres) and river estuaries.

Reyersviller (French pronunciation: [ʁejɛʁsvilɛʁ]; German: Reyersweiler; Lorraine Franconian: Reierschwiller) is a commune in the Moselle department of the Grand Est administrative region in north-eastern France.

The village belongs to the Pays de Bitche and to the Northern Vosges Regional Nature Park.

== See also ==
- Communes of the Moselle department
