= Bitche =

City in Grand Est, France

- Commune
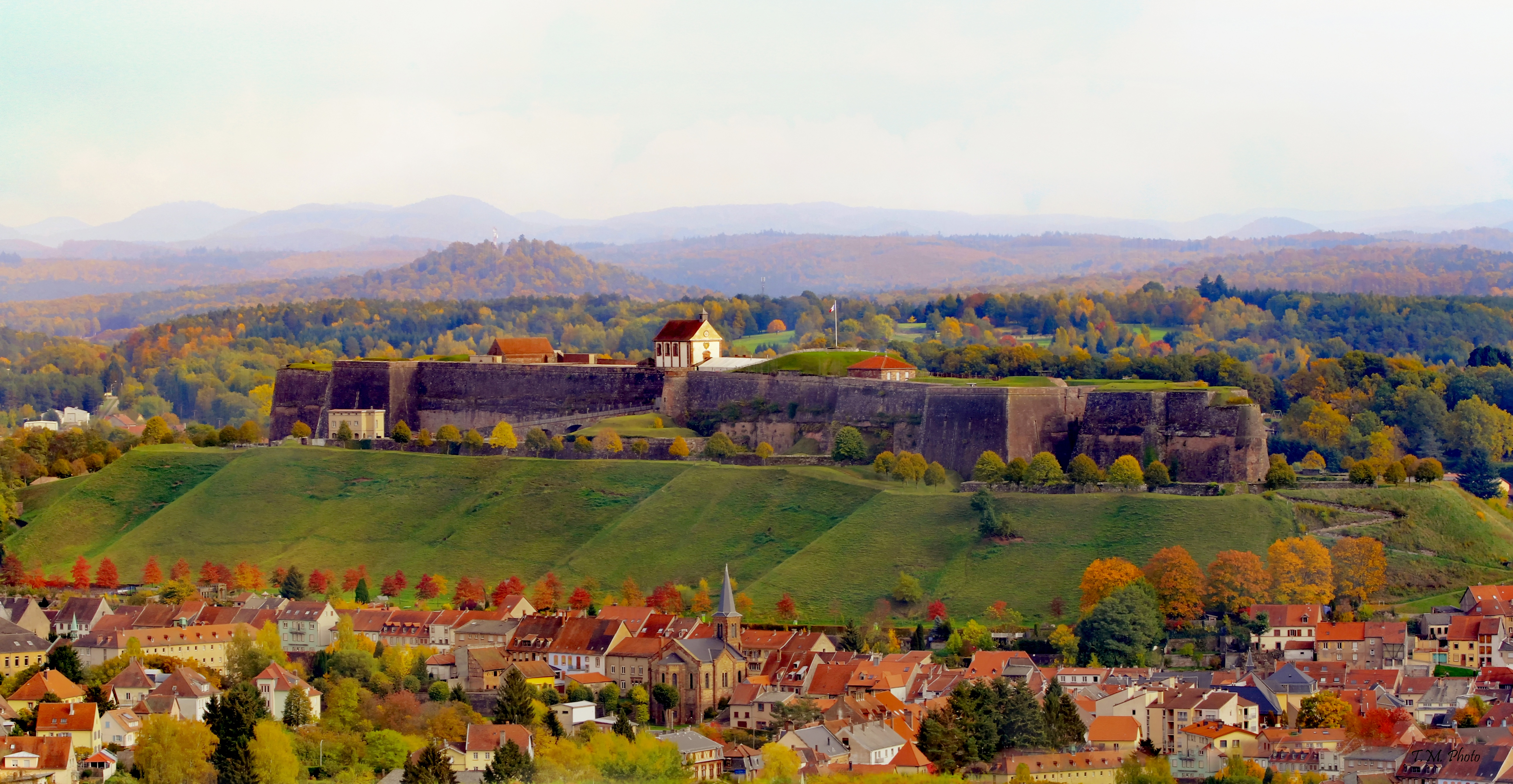
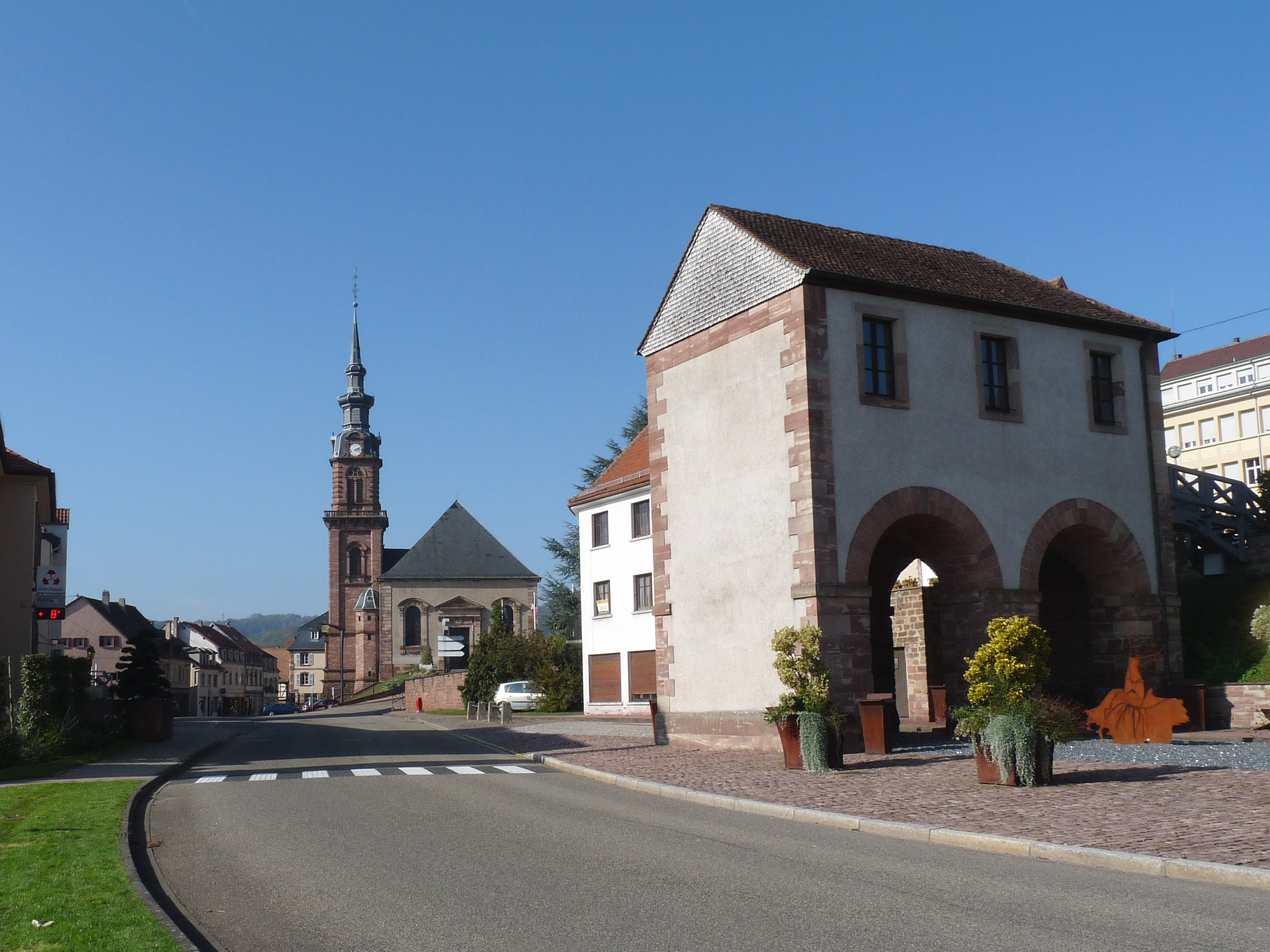
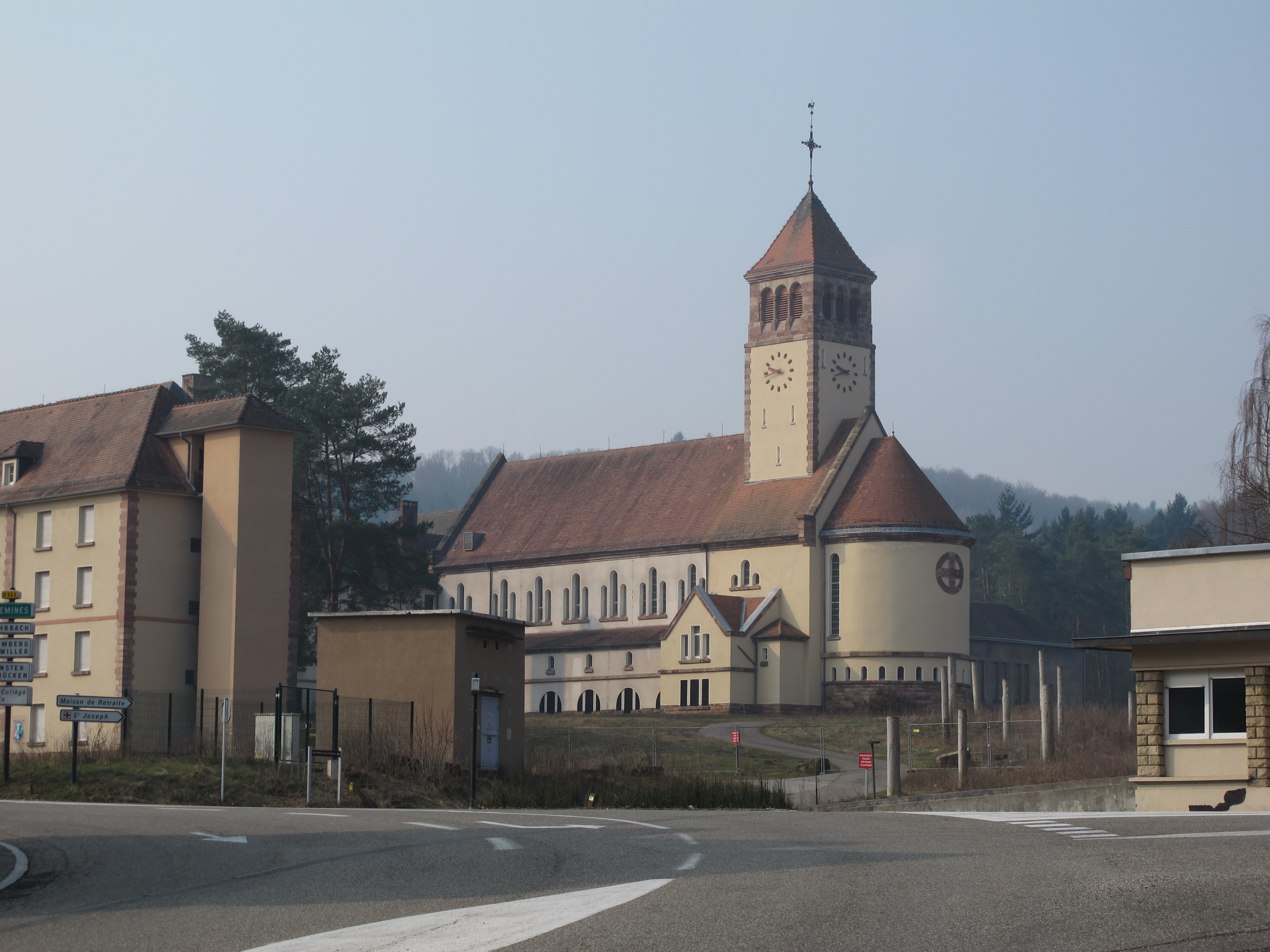
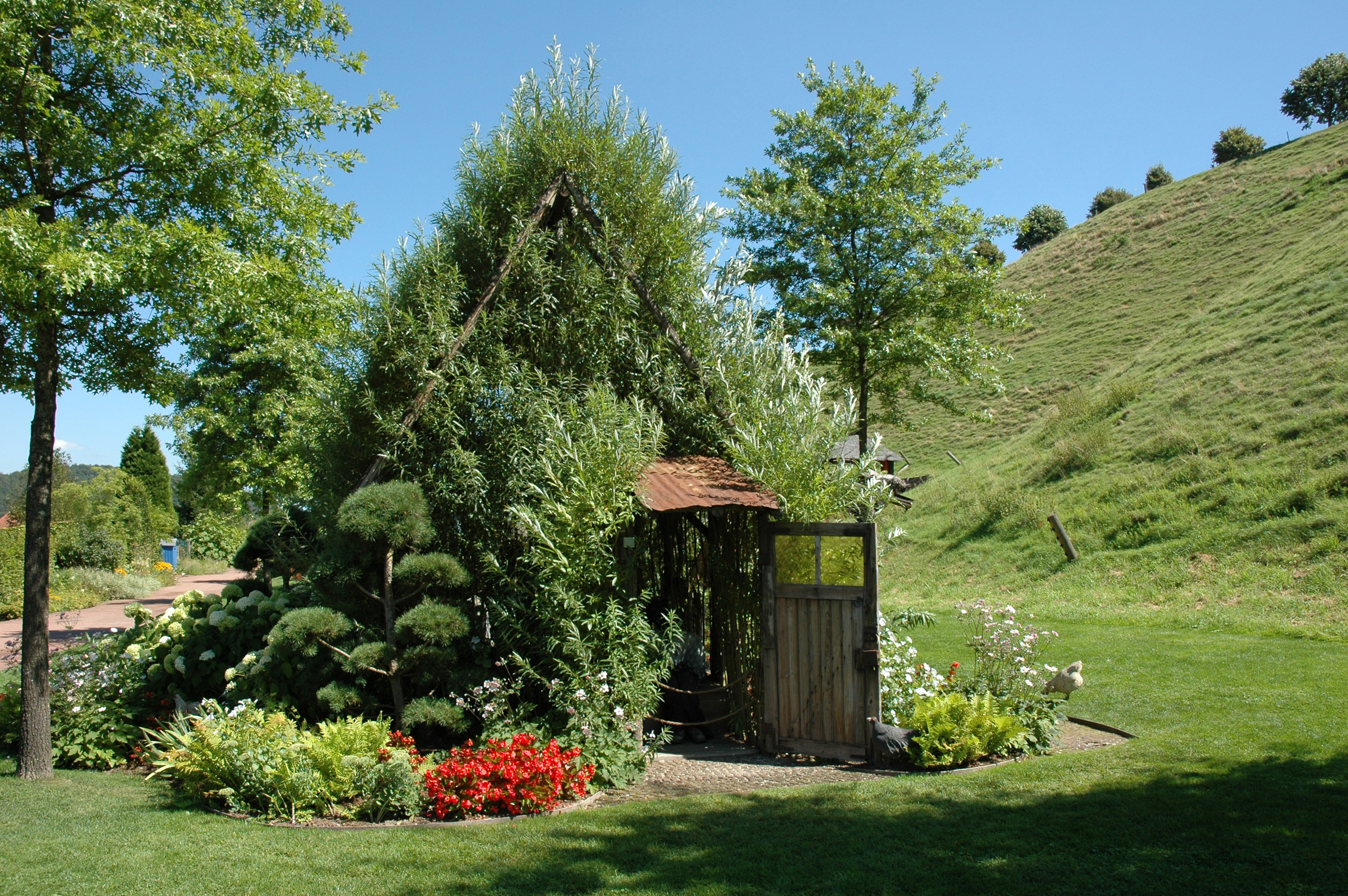
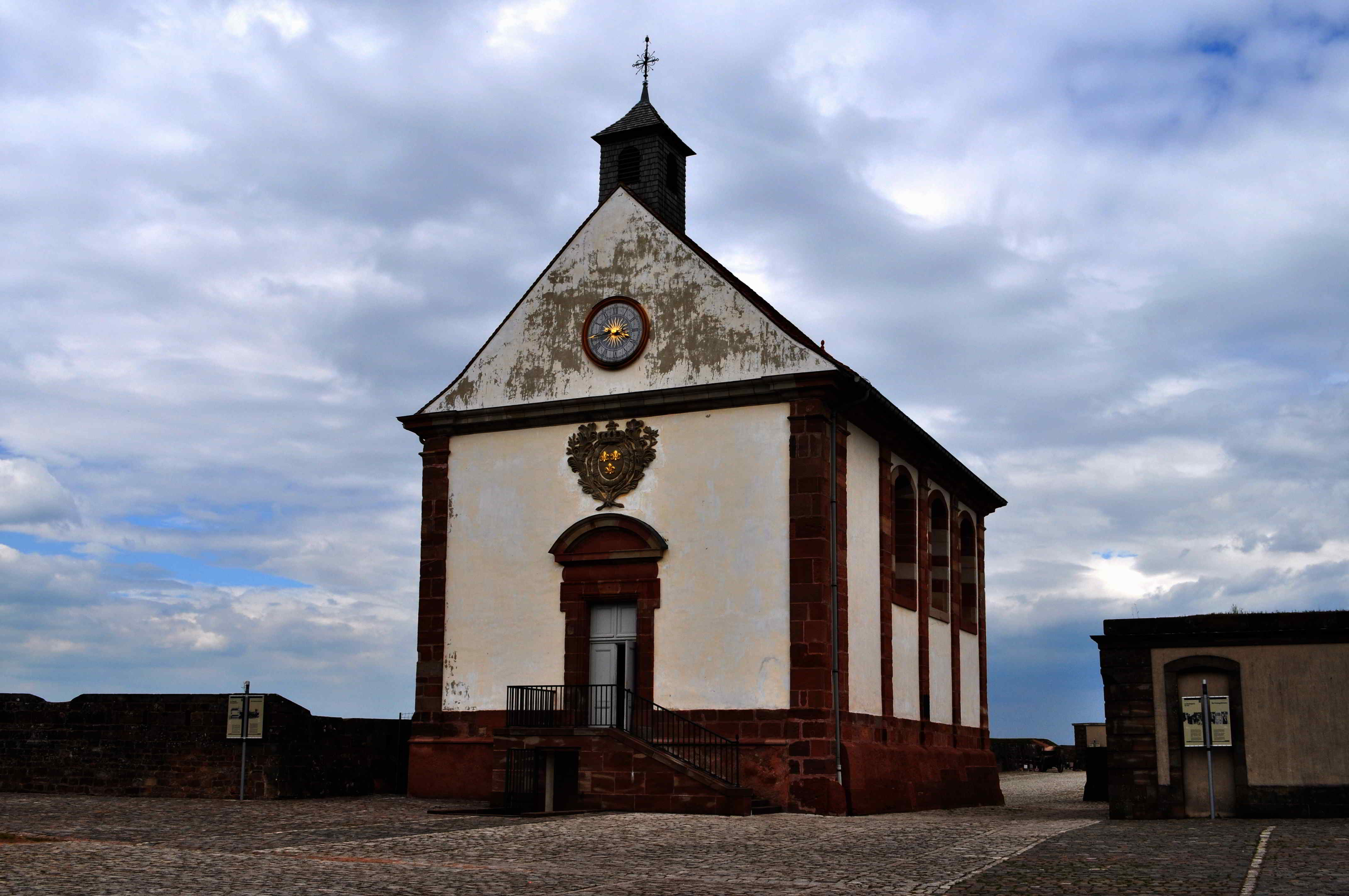
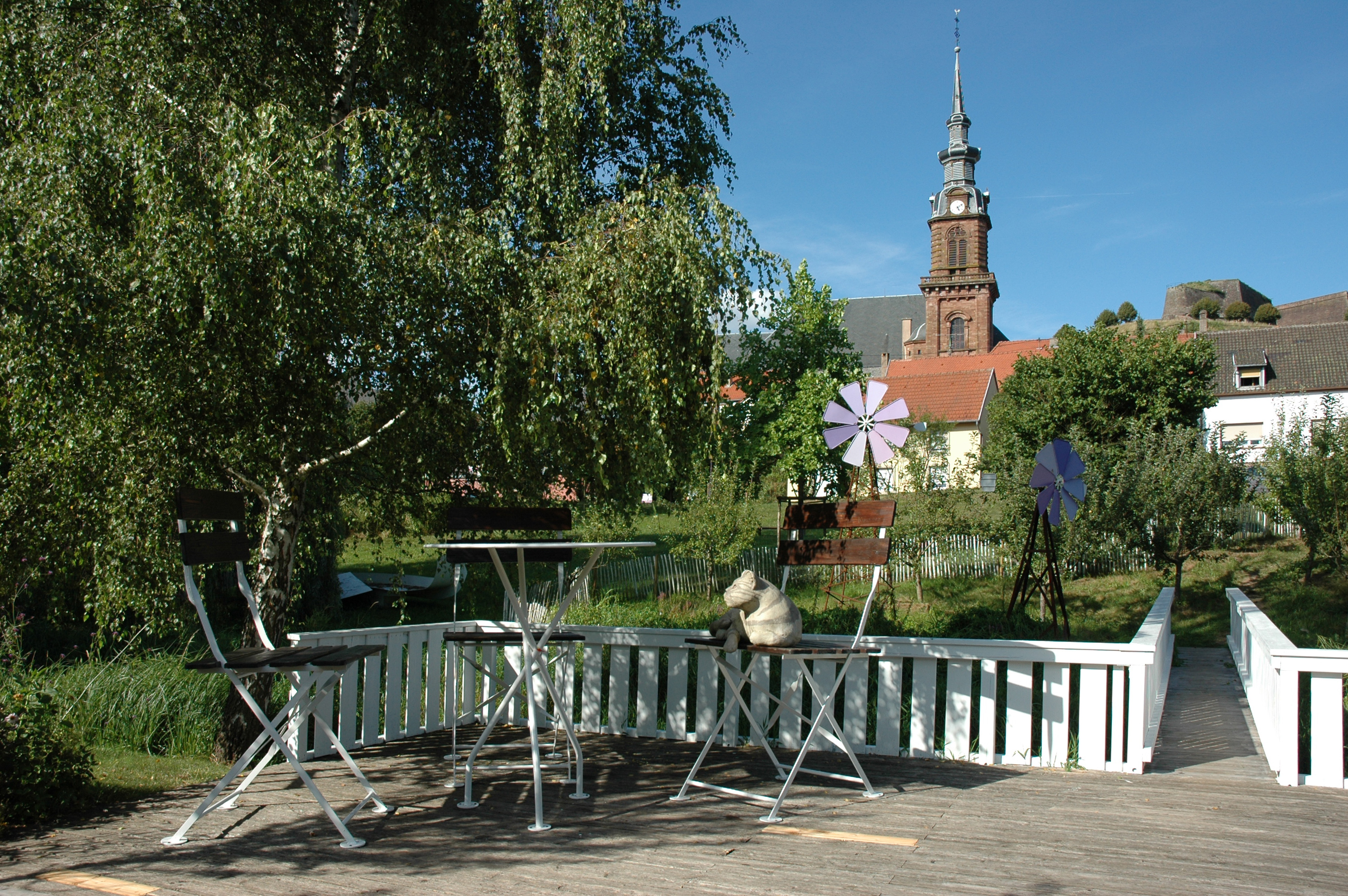
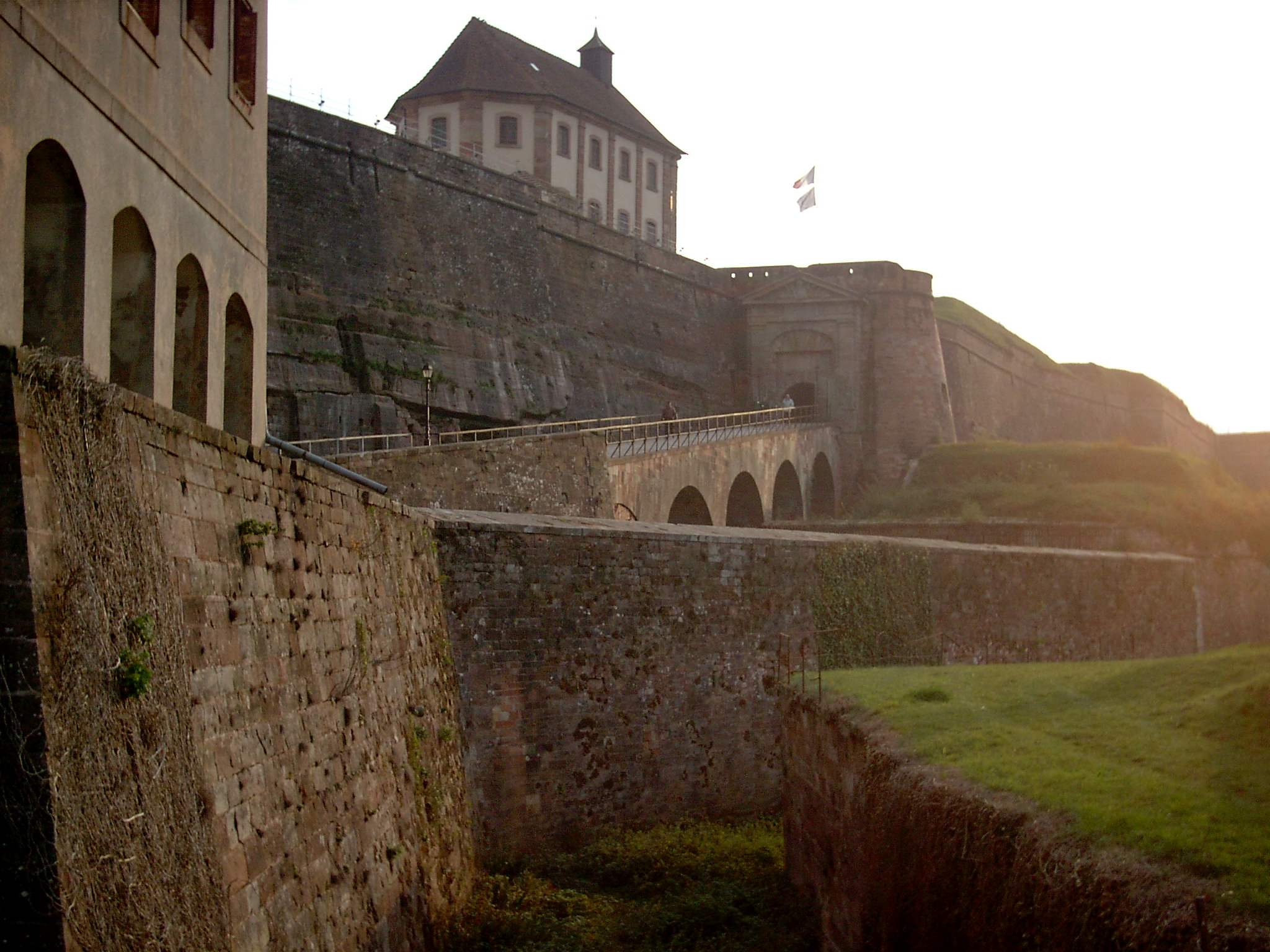
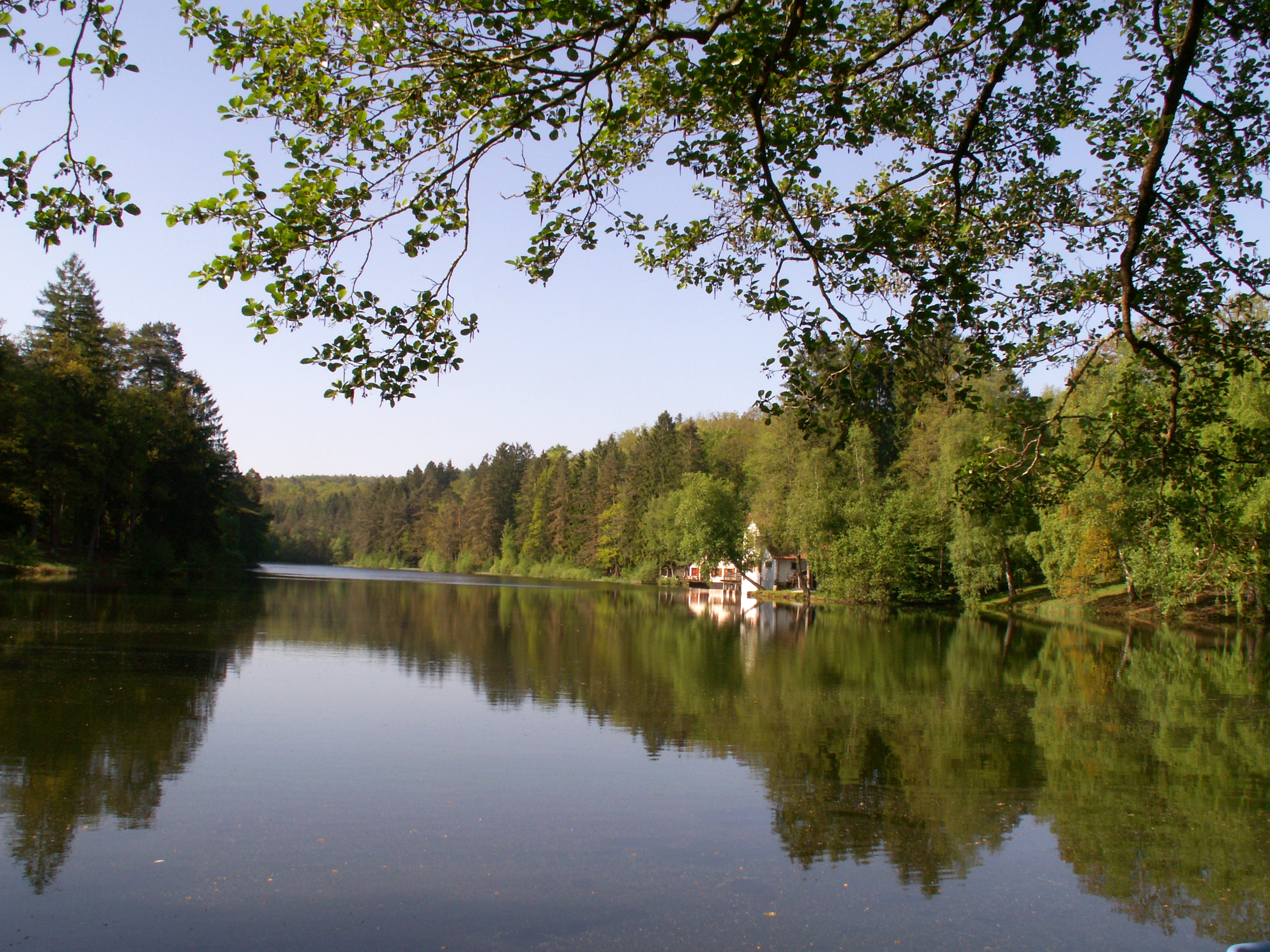
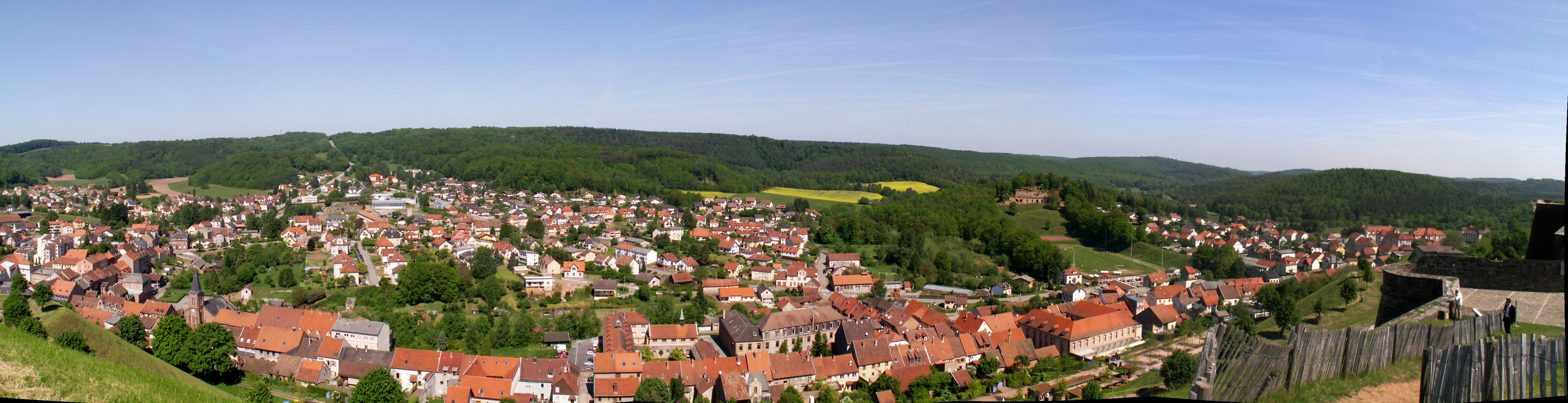
- From top left: Citadel; Porte de Strasbourg and Sainte-Catherine Church; Saint-Augustin Chapel; Jardins pour la paix; Citadel's Chapel; Jardins pour la paix with the Sainte-Catherine Church in the background; Citadel viewed from the side; The Hasselfurt pond; Skyline from the citadel

- Coat of arms
- Location of Bitche
- Location within France Location within Grand Est
- Coordinates: 49°03′09″N 07°25′48″E
- Country: France
- Region: Grand Est
- Department: Moselle
- Arrondissement: Sarreguemines
- Canton: Bitche
- Intercommunality: CC du Pays de Bitche

Government
  - Mayor (2020–2026): Benoît Kieffer
- Area^{1}: 41.13 km^{2} (15.88 sq mi)
- Elevation: 290 m (950 ft)
- Highest elevation: 432 m (1,417 ft)
- Lowest elevation: 249 m (817 ft)
- Population (2023): 4,966
  - Density: 120.7/km^{2} (312.7/sq mi)
- Time zone: UTC+01:00 (CET)
  - Summer (DST): UTC+02:00 (CEST)
- INSEE/Postal code: 57089 /57230
- ^{1} French Land Register data, which excludes lakes, ponds, glaciers > 1 km^{2} (0.386 sq mi or 247 acres) and river estuaries.

Bitche (English pronunciation: /biːtʃ/ BEECH, French: [bitʃ]; German and Lorraine Franconian: Bitsch) is a commune in Moselle department, in the region of Grand Est in northeastern France. It is the Pays de Bitche's capital city, and the seat of the Canton of Bitche and the Pays de Bitche community of communes.

The town belongs to the Northern Vosges Regional Nature Park and is rated four-flowers in the towns and villages in bloom competition. The inhabitants of the commune are known as Bitchois and Bitchoises.

The town is known for its large citadel originating from a castle built at the beginning of the 13th century. The fortress is noted for its resistance during the Franco-Prussian War. Its commander Louis-Casimir Teyssier held it for about eight months, with 3,000 men against about 20,000 Prussian and Bavarian soldiers, until the French government ordered him to surrender after the 1871 ceasefire. The town became part of Germany from that date until the end of the First World War, when it was given back to France. During the Second World War it was annexed by the Third German Reich (1940–1944).

== Geography ==
Bitche is located near the German border on the small river Horn, at the foot of the northern slope of the Vosges between Haguenau and Sarreguemines.

== History ==
The town of Bitche, which was formed from the villages of Rohr and Kaltenhausen in the 17th century, derives its name from the old stronghold (mentioned in 1172 as Bytis Castrum) standing on a rock some 250 feet (76 m) above the town. This had long given its name to the countship of Bitsch, which was originally in the possession of the dukes of Lorraine. In 1297 it passed by marriage to Eberhard I of Zweibrücken-Bitsch, whose line became extinct in 1569. Afterwards the countship reverted to Lorraine, and passed with that duchy to France in 1766.

After 1766 the town rapidly increased in population. The citadel, which had been constructed by Sébastien Le Prestre de Vauban on the site of the old castle after the town's capture by the French in 1624, had been destroyed when it was restored to Lorraine in 1698. It was restored and strengthened in 1740 into a fortress that proved impregnable up until the 20th century. An attack upon it by the Prussians in 1793 was repulsed.

During the Napoleonic Wars, 1804–1814, the citadel at Bitche became a major prisoner-of-war camp housing British and allied soldiers and sailors. It was also used in this context as a penal camp, housing repeated escapees and uncooperative prisoners.

In 1815 during Napoleon's Hundred Days, Brigadier-General Charles Creutzer was the commandant of the town's fortress. Bitche was besieged by General Friedrich Zollern's Fourth Infantry Division of the Austrian IV Corps, but Creutzer refused to surrender until the general armistice.

Although Bitche was hotly contested by the Germans after the Battle of Wörth during the Franco-Prussian War in 1870, it held out until the war's end. A large part of the fortification is built into the red sandstone rock, and was rendered bomb-proof; a supply of water was secured to the garrison by a deep well in the interior. The commander of the town's fortress was Louis-Casimir Teyssier. After the war, it was given to the German Empire as part of Alsace–Lorraine. It was returned to France in 1918, after the First World War.

The town is near the Maginot Line, into which the citadel was integrated. Alsace-Lorraine returned to Germany after the Battle of France in the summer of 1940 and remained under German occupation. The training ground at Bitche was utilized by the German Army to form new divisions, for example the 65th Infantry Division in July 1942. The town was liberated in December 1944 by Allied troops but was relinquished in a withdrawal forced by the German counteroffensive. In March 1945 the U.S. 100th Infantry Division broke through the Maginot Line in the area and liberated the town for good, as part of Operation Undertone.

After 1945, Bitche became one of the busiest military camps where all parts of the French army manoeuvered. Infantry and cavalry also went to the town to experiment with new weapons during the Cold War. Special training took place against potential bacteriological attacks from the Eastern Bloc.

Until 1997, military service was compulsory in France. Millions of soldiers had a few days of training in Bitche.

On 19 March 2021 the official page of Bitche on Facebook was removed without explanation. After the incident was reported by media, Facebook restored the page and apologized to the town.

== Population ==
Historical population

Year	Pop.	±% p.a.
1793	2,480	—
1821	2,698	+0.30%
1841	3,033	+0.59%
1871	3,047	+0.02%
1900	3,640	+0.62%
1926	3,486	−0.17%
1946	3,479	−0.01%
1962	4,277	+1.30%
1968	5,004	+2.65%

Year	Pop.	±% p.a.
1975	5,055	+0.14%
1982	5,648	+1.60%
1990	5,517	−0.29%
1999	5,752	+0.46%
2007	5,555	−0.43%
2012	5,267	−1.06%
2017	5,098	−0.65%
2023	4,966	−0.44%

Source: EHESS and INSEE (1968–2023)

== International relations ==
Bitche has been twinned with Lebach, Saarland, Germany, since 1979.

The town was mentioned in the BBC comedy panel game QI, in episode 9 of season 3 (or series C). Bill Bailey commented on the comical nature of seeing a sign "You are now leaving Bitche."

== Gallery ==
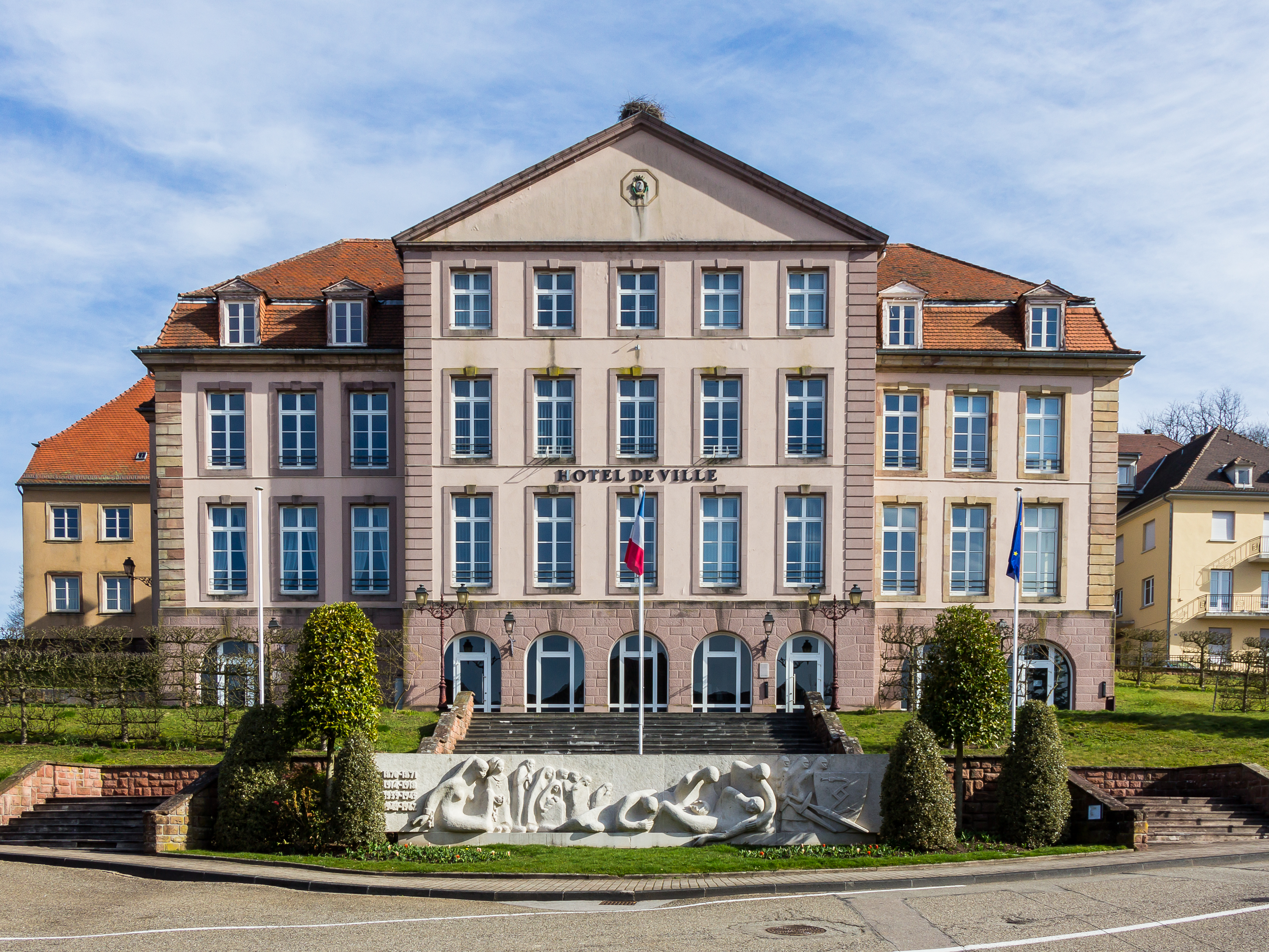
The city hall in Bitche

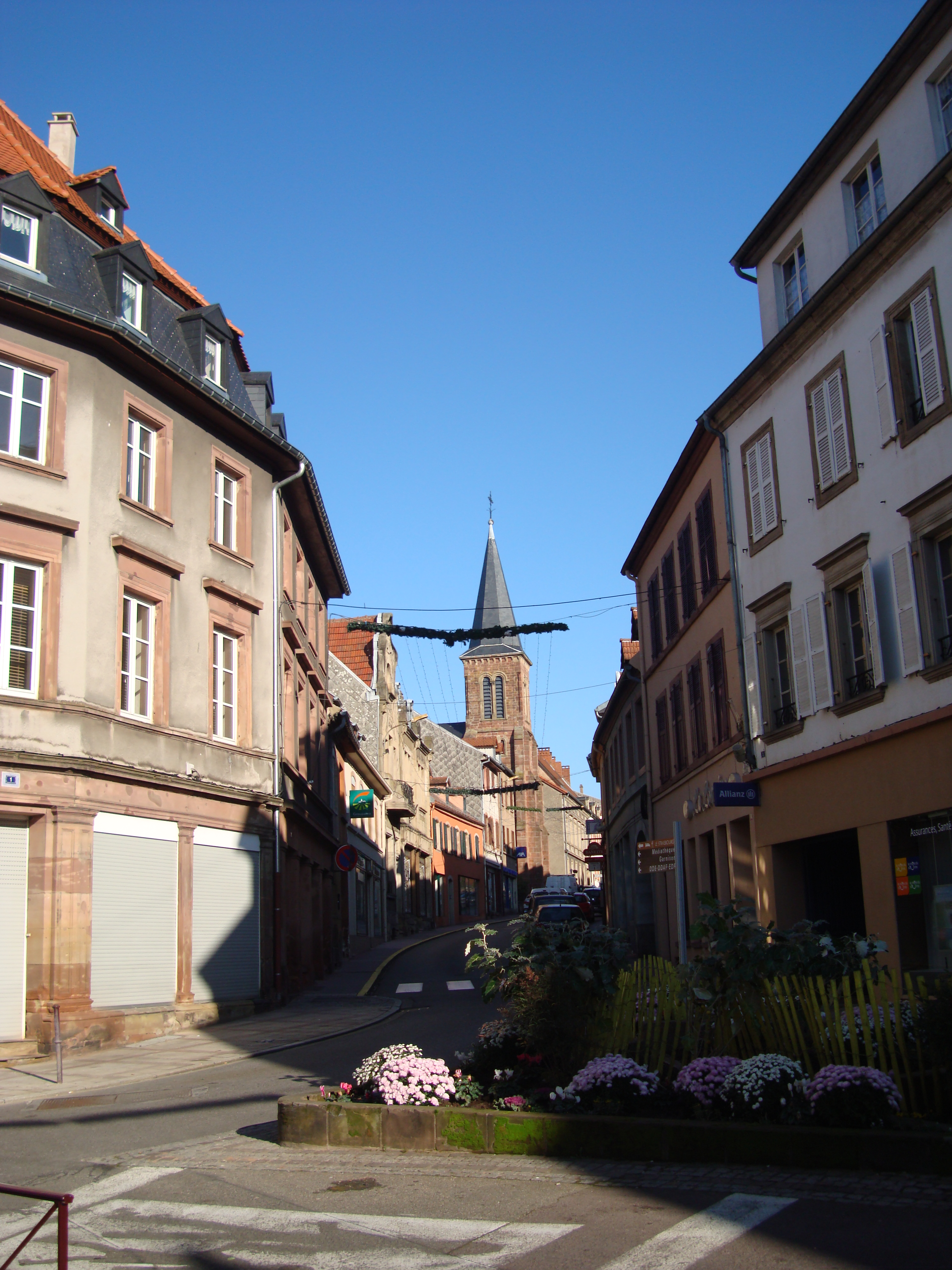
Looking down a street in Bitche

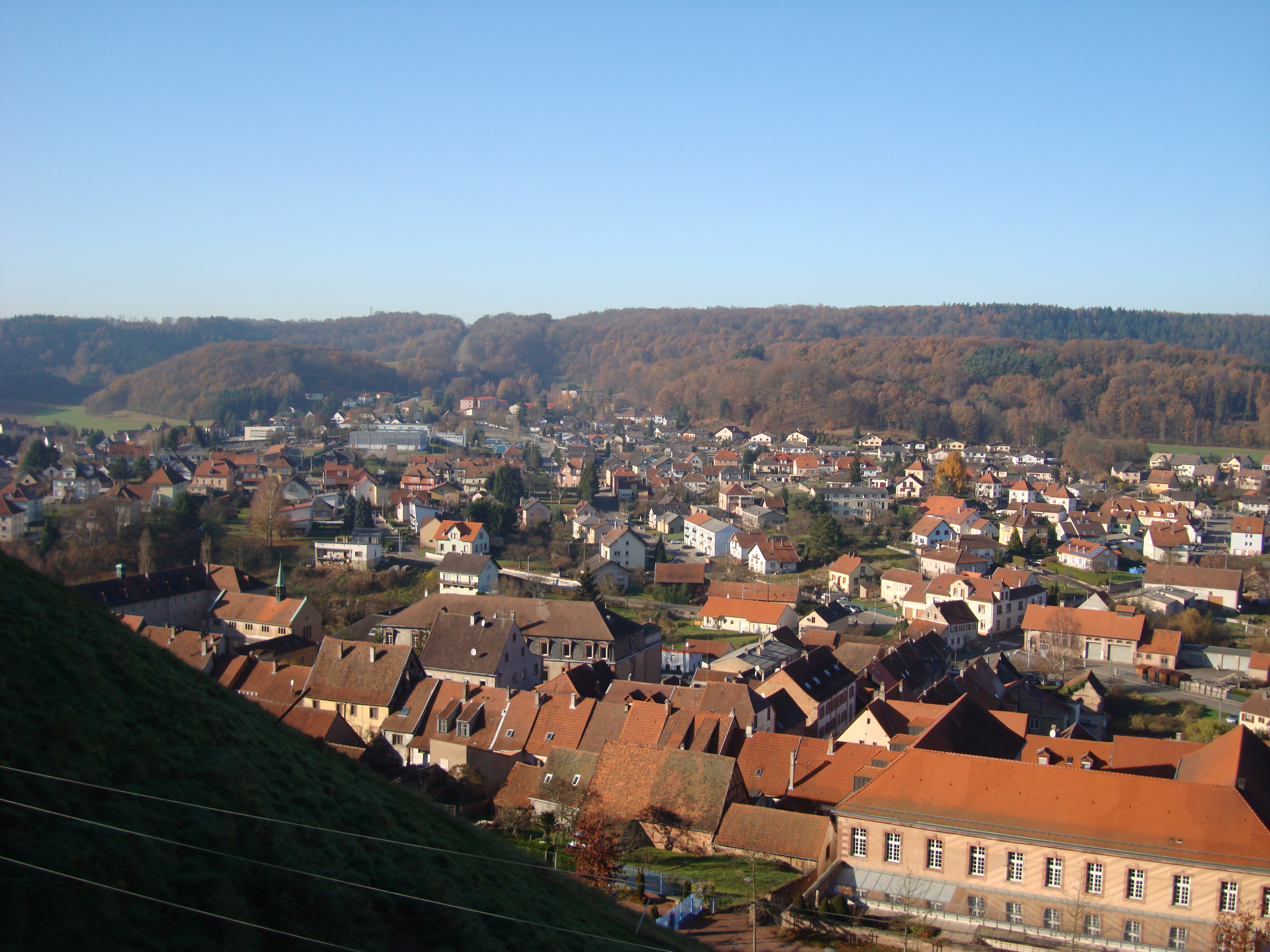
Overlooking Bitche from the Citadel

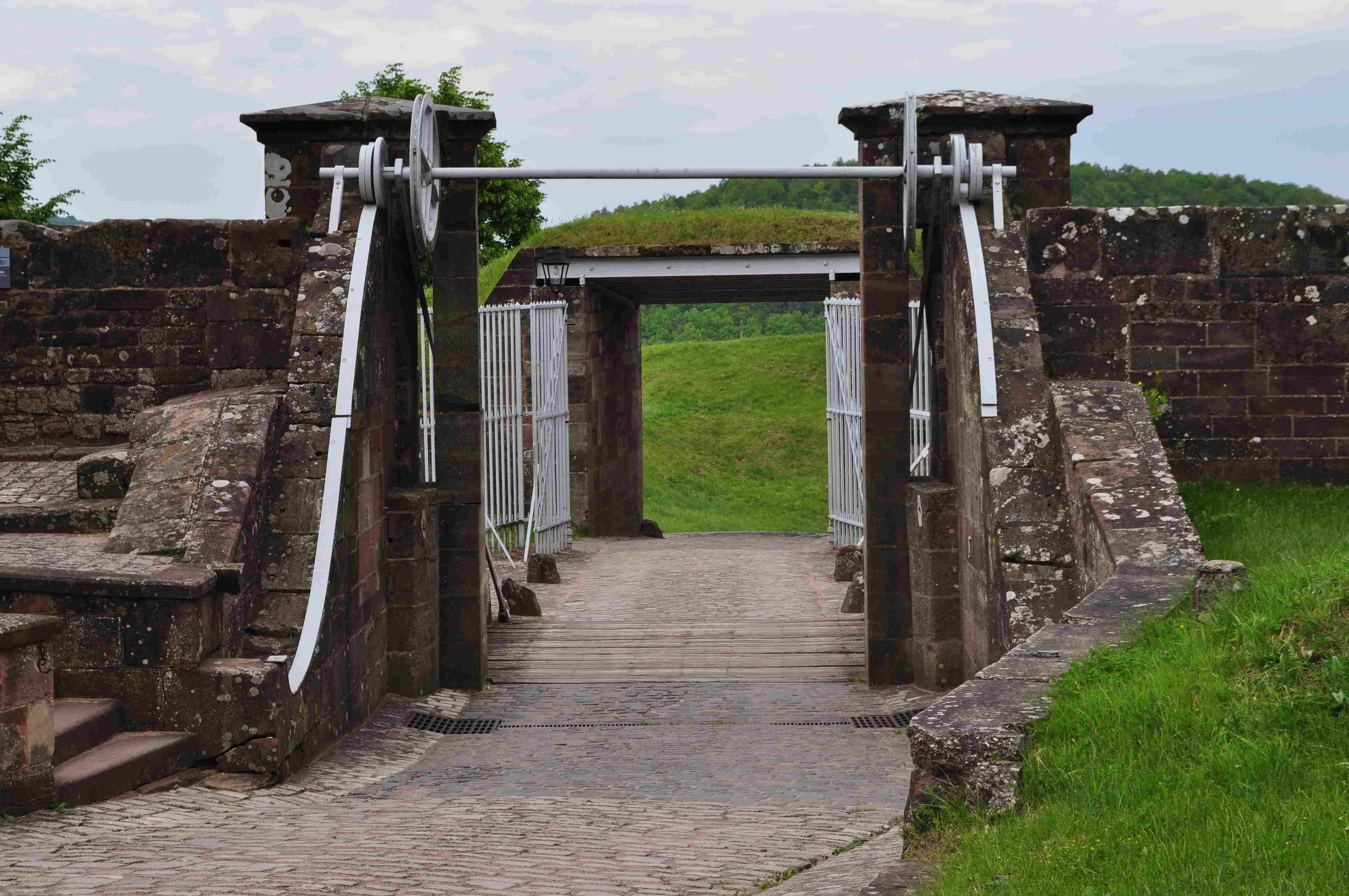
Bitche Citadel Drawbridge

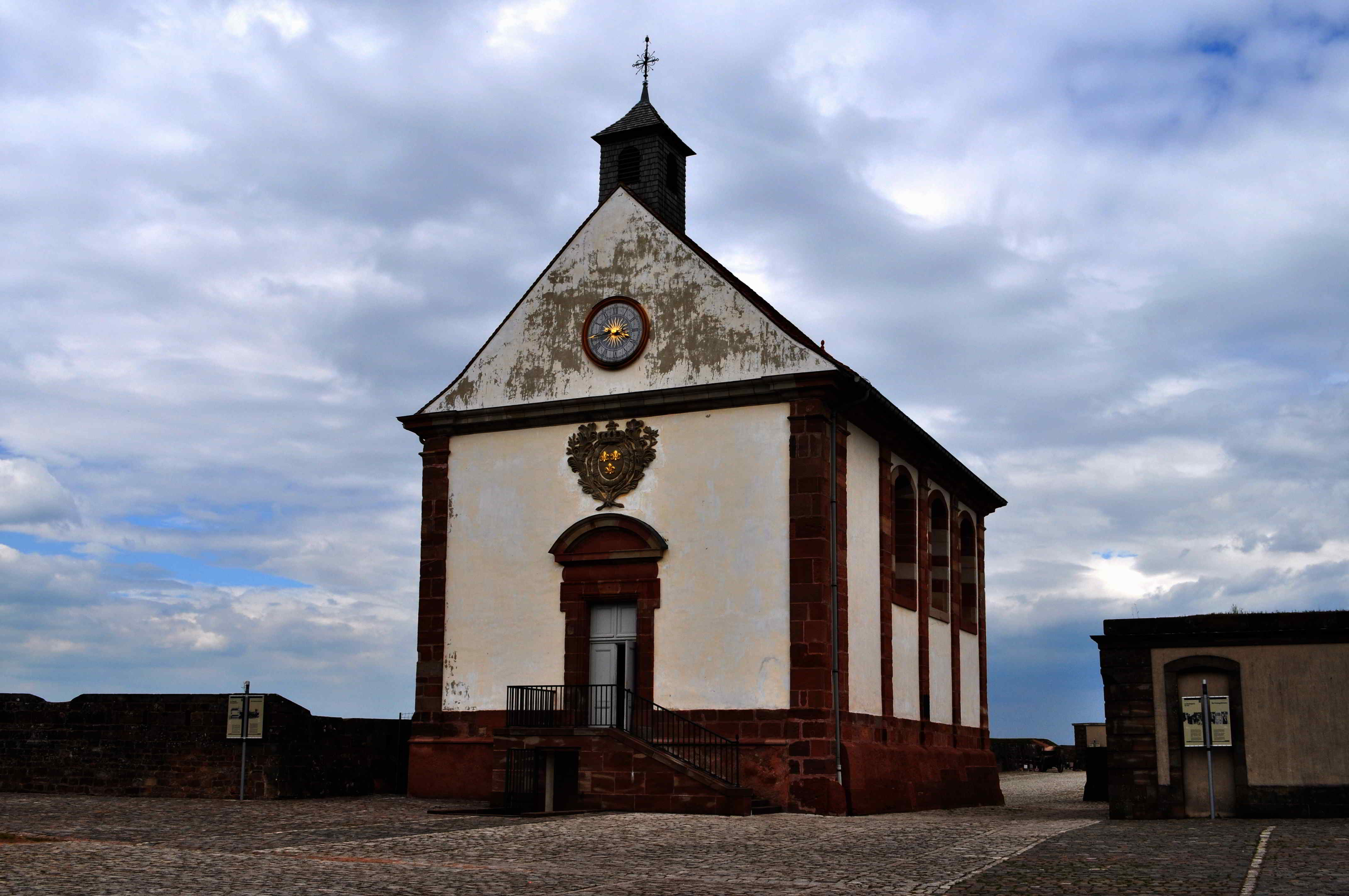
Garrison Chapel at the top of Bitche Citadel

== See also ==
- Communes of the Moselle department
