= List of lords of Bouillon =

The lordship of Bouillon was, in the 10th and 11th centuries, one of the core holdings of the Ardennes–Bouillon dynasty, and appears to have been their original patrimonial possession.

The Bouillon estate was a collection of fiefs, allodial land, and other rights. The collection included e.g. the allod villages of Bellevaux, Mogimont, Senseruth, and Assenois, the advocacy of the monastery of Saint-Hubert and Ardennes, and the land to the south of Bouillon, formerly the land of the abbey of Mouzon, now held as a fief of the archbishop of Reims.

During the 10th and 11th centuries, the lords of Bouillon also held, for shorter or longer periods, the duchy of Lower Lorraine, county of Verdun, margraviate of Antwerp, along with many lesser titles.

== List of the lords of Bouillon ==
It is difficult to draw an exact list of the lords of Bouillon, as the lordship did not automatically follow the better documented ducal and comital titles held by the dynasty.

Since Bouillon is believed to be the patrimonial possession of the dynasty, one would believe the lordship was inherited by the oldest son. Based on this assumption, one can set up a tentative list of the lords of Bouillon.

- Godfrey the Captive (?, possibly until abt. 1002)
- Frederick, son of above (?, possibly abt. 1002–1005)
- Godfrey the Childless, younger brother of Frederick (?, probably 1005–1023)
- Gozelo, younger brother of Frederick and Godfrey (1023–1044)
- Godfrey the Bearded, son of above (1044–1069)
- Godfrey the Hunchback, son of above (1069–1076)
- Godfrey the Crusader, nephew of Godfrey the Hunchback (1076–1096)

sold to the Prince-Bishopric of Liège

== See also ==
- Duke of Bouillon
