= Godfrey II of Lower Lorraine =

Duke in the Holy Roman Empire

Godfrey II
- Duke of Lower Lotharingia
- Tenure: 1012-1023
- Born: 965
- Died: 1023
- Noble family: House of Ardennes-Verdun
- Father: Godfrey I, Count of Verdun
- Mother: Matilda of Saxony

Godfrey (or Godefrid) II (965–1023), called the Childless, son of Godfrey I, Count of Verdun (d. 1002) was the first of several members of his family to become duke of Lower Lorraine (also known as Lower Lotharingia) which roughly corresponded to modern Belgium, southern Netherlands, and the northern part of the German Rhineland.

== Biography ==
Godfrey was appointed duke on the advice of Godfrey's close relative Gerard of Florennes, bishop of Cambrai. He was appointed to this position by the emperor Henry II in 1012 after it had been vacant for seven years since the death of Duke Otto, son of the previous duke, Charles.

Godfrey and his family, the so-called House of Ardennes-Verdun, were loyal to Henry II, whose reign was troubled by a disputed succession and factional conflict. As a result Godfrey, like his father, is remembered for his role in leading military missions against the magnates of his own region, including Dirk III of Holland, Lambert I, Count of Leuven, Regnier V the count of Hainaut, and Gerard, count of Metz. Seen by chroniclers as rebels, these men had powerful allies. The chronicle of the bishops of Cambrai, in its entry for 1017, openly complains that the sisters of Henry II's own wife, Cunigunde of Luxembourg, were arousing rebellions against the status quo. Gerhard was married to a sister of Cunigunde, and another sister was the mother of Dirk III. Her brothers were rebels in several parts of the empire: Count Frederick of Luxembourg, Archbishop Adalbero of Trier, Bishop Thierry II of Metz and Henry V, Duke of Bavaria, who was deposed from his dukedom in 1009. Henry II was eventually replaced by a nephew of Count Gerhard, Conrad II.

Also complicating the conflicts of Lower Lotharingia was the continuing involvement of French magnates in the west of the region, especially the counts of Flanders. The boundary between Flanders and Lower Lotharingia was the Scheldt river, but the Flemish counts became lords on both sides of the river during this period. Under Godfrey, two of his brothers were placed as margraves at forts on the Scheldt, responsible for special frontier lordships or margraviates. Gozelo was based at Antwerp, while Herman was based at Ename. The family's county of Verdun in Upper Lotharingia went to another brother, Frederick. It was Gozelo who became the duke of both Lower and Upper Lorraine after the death of Godfrey the childless.

In 1006, Lambert was an ally of the powerful Counts of Flanders in their successful efforts to gain a foothold in the empire, east of the Schelde. For this reason, the emperor Henry II held Lambert's son hostage. The entry of Flanders into Lotharingia was a major turning point, balancing the power of the House of Ardenne, and giving Lambert and his own family a new long-run ally.

In 1013, Godfrey and Herman were defeated while defending the interests of the Prince-bishop of Liège at Hoegaarden, against an attack of Lambert I, Count of Louvain. Herman was captured and placed in the custody of Robert II, Count of Namur. He was soon released due to the negotiations on his behalf by Robert's mother Ermengarde, who achieved imperial forgiveness for Robert in return.

At Florennes, on 12 September 1015, Godfrey defeated Count Lambert and his nephew Regnier V, the count of Hainaut, killing Lambert and forcing Regnier to make peace. Godfrey's cousin the bishop of Cambrai, Gerard, reluctantly gave permission for Herman's daughter to marry Regnier, in the interests of peace.

In 1017 Godfrey defeated Count Gerhard, who had been a close ally of Lambert, in a battle which apparently began as a judicial duel, although the chronicle of the bishops of Cambrai suggests that this battle was originally planned by Gerhard as a surprise attack. Gerhard's son Siegfried was captured and later died. Also with Gerhard was the future king Conrad II, the son of Count Gerhard's sister Adelaide of Metz, who Dietmar says was injured. In 1018, Godfrey and Gerhard were forced to make peace by the emperor.

Later in 1018 Godfrey II was crushingly defeated and captured when leading imperial forces against another rebel, Dirk III, Count of Holland. Dirk's mother, like Gerhard's wife, was a sister of the emperor's wife Cunegunde.

== Family and dukedom ==
Godfrey was the first of his family, the Verdun branch of the House of Ardenne, to be given the high position of Duke over the northern or "lower" part of the old "Middle kingdom" of Lotharingia, or Lorraine. However his family continued to be granted these positions for several generations, and female members of the family were married to several of the main comital families of the region. This included the descendants of his enemy the count of Leuven, who eventually came to be Dukes themselves. The family's other great rivals, their cousins in the Luxembourg branch of the House of Ardenne, continued to be rivals for the Dukedom. Within a few generations of Godfrey the single Dukedom of Lower Lorraine was replaced by two distinct Dukedoms of Leuven and Limbourg-sur-Vesdre, neither of which had the same imperial function as the old position.

Count Gozelin	Oda of Metz
Adalbero; Archbishop of Reims	Godfrey the Captive; Count of Verdun
Herman of Ename	Frederick; Count of Verdun	Godfrey the Childless; Duke of Lower Lorraine	Adalbero, Bishop of Verdun	Gozelo I the Great; Duke of both Lorraines
Mathilda m.Regnier V, Count of Mons	Godfrey the Bearded; Duke of both Lorraines (rebel)	Gozelo II the lazy Duke of Lower Lorraine?	Pope Stephen IX	Regelindis m.Albert II, Count of Namur	Oda/Uda m.Lambert II, Count of Leuven
Herman, Count of Hainaut	Godfrey the Hunchback; Duke of Lower Lorraine	Ida m.Eustace II, Count of Boulogne	Albert III, Count of Namur; Vice Duke of Lower Lorraine	Henry II; Count of Leuven
Eustace III, Count of Boulogne; Count of Boulogne	Godfrey of Bouillon; Duke of Lower Lorraine; King of Jerusalem	Baldwin I King of Jerusalem	Godfrey; Count of Leuven; Duke of Lower Lorraine

== Bibliography ==
- Bachrach, David (2018). "The Battle of Vlaardingen: 'Who could doubt that such a powerful army would prevail?'". Medieval Warfare. 8 (3): 22–33. ISSN 2211-5129. JSTOR 48577924.
- Murray, Alan V. (1992), "The army of Godfrey of Bouillon, 1096-1099: Structure and dynamics of a contingent on the First Crusade", Revue belge de Philologie et d'Histoire, 70 (2): 301–329, doi:10.3406/rbph.1992.3824
- Vanheule, Koen (2016). "Reformist hagiography: the Life of St Roding of Beaulieu and the struggle for power in early eleventh-century Lotharingia". Journal of Medieval History. 42 (5): 511–534. doi:10.1080/03044181.2016.1230512. hdl:1854/LU-6951178. ISSN 0304-4181. S2CID 56384293.
- de Waha, Michel (2000), "Filii Ragineri in terra patrum suorum relocati sunt. Pouvoir, opposition et intégration dans le Hainaut du Xème siècle", in Billen, Claire (ed.), Hainaut et Tournaisis, regards sur dix siècles d'histoire. Recueil d'études dédiées à la mémoire de Jacques Nazet (1944-1996), pp. 61–85

Medieval works

- Alpertus of Metz, De diversitate temporum:

- Latin MGH edition: Alpertus of Metz (1841), Pertz (ed.), De diversitate temporum, MGH Scriptores, vol. 4
- Dutch translation: Alpertus of Metz (1999), Gebeurtenissen van deze tijd, translated by van Rij, Hilversum
- English translation: Alpertus of Metz (2012), Warfare and Politics in Medieval Germany, ca. 1000. On the Variety of Our Times, translated by Bachrach, David S.

- Dietmar (Thietmar) of Merseburg, Chronicon:

- Older Latin MGH edition: Thietmar of Merseburg, Lappenberg (ed.), Chronicon, MGH Scriptores, vol. 3, p. 851
- Newer Latin MGH edition: Holtsmann, ed. (1935), Chronicon, MGH SS rer. Germ. N. S., vol. 9
- English translation: Ottonian Germany. The Chronicon of Thietmar of Merseburg, translated by Warner, David A., Manchester, 2001
- German translation: R. Holtzmann,Die Chronik des Bischofs Thietmar von Merseburg und ihre Korveier Überarbeitung reproduced by Trillmich in 1957.

- Gesta episcoporum Cameracensium:

- Latin MGH edition: Bethmann, Ludwig Conrad, ed. (1846), Gesta episcoporum Cameracensium, MGH Scriptores, vol. 7
- English translation: Bachrach, David S; Bachrach, Bernard S; Leese, Michael, Deeds of the Bishops of Cambrai, Translation and Commentary

Preceded by Otto	Duke of Lower Lorraine; 1012–1023	Succeeded by Gothelo I
Preceded by Frederic	Lord of Bouillon; 1002–1023	Succeeded by Adalberon
