= County of Verdun =

Medieval county

The County of Verdun was a sovereign medieval county in the Duchy of Lower Lorraine.

== County ==
The rulers of the sovereign County of Verdun styled themselves as Counts by the grace of God. The small country was located near Lower Lotharingia within the Holy Roman Empire. The Prince-Bishopric of Verdun bordered on it from the east. The Forest of Argonne formed the western border of the county, but it also included the fortresses at Montfaucon-d'Argonne and Vienne-le-Château. According to an imperial diploma issued in 1156, Bishop Haimo of Verdun received the right to appoint counts, but the counts from the Ardennes-Bouillon dynasty made the office hereditary by the end of the 10th century.

== List of counts ==
- to 923 Ricwin, married first to the daughter of Engelram, Chamberlain to Charles the Bald, and second to Cunigunda, widow of Wigeric, Count of Bidgau
- 923–944 Otto, also duke of Lorraine from 940, son of Ricwin by his first marriage
- 944–963 Raoul, also Count of Ivois (as Rudolfe II)
- 963–1002 Godfrey I, called the Prisoner, son of Gothelo, Count of Bidgau, son of Wigeric and Cunigunda, and Uda of Metz; married Matilda, daughter of Herman, Duke of Saxony
- 1002–1012 Godfrey II, son of previous, duke of Lower Lorraine from 1012 to his death in 1023
- 1012–1022 Frederick, brother of previous
- 1022–1024 Herman (d.1029), brother of previous, retired to monastery
- 1024–1025 Louis, also count of Chiny, received the county from Bishop Raimbert, killed by Gothelo, brother of Herman, who took the city and gave it as an appanage to Godfrey, his son
- 1025–1069 Godfrey III, called the Bearded, also duke of Upper Lorraine from 1044 and Lower Lorraine from 1065, he was deprived of his possessions, Verdun included, by the Emperor Henry III, but he was reinstated and spent his life vacillating between rebellion and peace
- 1069–1076 Godfrey IV, called the Hunchback, son of previous, also duke of Lower Lorraine
- 1076–1086 Matilda of Tuscany, called la Gran Contessa, widow of previous, also marquise of Tuscany
- 1086–1095 Godfrey V (d.1100), nephew of Godfrey IV, also duke of Lower Lorraine from 1089 and defender of the Holy Sepulchre from 1099
  - unknown
- 1100–1105 Theodoric, also count of Montbéliard and Bar
- 1105–1134 Reginald (d.1149), called le Borgne, son of previous, also count of Montbéliard and Bar

In 1134, the bishop deposed Reginald and reattached the county to the episcopal demesne.

== Sources ==
- Murray, Alan V. (2000). The Crusader Kingdom of Jerusalem: A Dynastic History, 1099–1125. Prosopographica et Geneologica. ISBN 978-1-9009-3403-9.
