= House of Ardenne–Verdun =

Lotharingian noble house

The House of Ardenne–Verdun (French: Maison d'Ardenne-Verdun) was a branch of the House of Ardenne, one of the first documented medieval European noble families, centered on Verdun. The family dominated in the Duchy of Lotharingia (Lorraine) in the 10th and 11th centuries. All members descended from Cunigunda of France, a granddaughter of the West Frankish king Louis the Stammerer. She married twice but all or most of her children were children of her first husband, Count Palatine Wigeric of Lotharingia. The other main branches of the House of Ardennes were the House of Ardenne–Luxembourg, and the House of Ardenne–Bar.

== History ==
Wigeric's son Gozlin (911–942/43) became the dynasty's ancestor when he succeeded his father as count in the Ardennes and about 930 married Oda (d. 963), a daughter of Count Gerhard I of Metz and niece of the East Frankish king Henry the Fowler. His brothers were

Upper and Lower Lorraine in the 10th century

- Adalbero, who became Bishop of Metz in 929,
- Frederick, Count of Bar from 955 and Duke of Upper Lorraine from 959,
- Sigfried, first Count of Luxembourg from 963, ancestor of the Elder House of Luxembourg.

Gozelin's brother Frederick already acted as a ruler over Upper Lorraine during the reign of the Ottonian duke Bruno the Great, confirmed by Emperor Otto I after Bruno's death in 965. He was succeeded by his son Theodoric in 978.

Gozlin's sons were Godfrey, known as "the Captive", and Adalbero, Archbishop of Reims from 969. Godfrey succeeded his father in the Ardennes counties; he appeared as Count of Verdun about 960. He married Matilda, a daughter of the Saxon margrave Hermann Billung and widow of Count Baldwin III of Flanders. In 1012 his son Godfrey II was appointed Duke of Lower Lorraine by the East Frankish (German) king Henry II, in order to protect the lands against claims raised by West Francia (France). With Godfrey's uncle Duke Theodoric, both Lower and Upper Lorraine then were held by the House of Ardennes.

The line of Upper Lorraine dukes became extinct upon the death of Theodoric's grandson Duke Frederick III in 1033; whereafter his cousin Gothelo, son and heir of Duke Godfrey II of Lower Lorraine II could unite both duchies in his hands. After his death in 1044, however, King Henry III enfeoffed Lower Lorraine to his younger son Gothelo II and the elder, Godfrey III the Bearded, could only succeed in Upper Lorraine. When Gothelo II died two years later, Godfrey III claimed his rights but found Henry III unwilling to re-unite both duchies. He openly rebelled, campaigned the Lower Lorraine lands and was finally declared deposed by the emperor. Thereafter, Upper Lorraine was lost and passed to Count Adalbert of Metz, a son of late Theodoric's daughter Gisela, and his descendants of the Ardennes-Metz dynasty, ancestors of the later House of Lorraine.

Godfrey III could again strengthen his position, when in 1054 he married Beatrice, a sister of the later Upper Lorraine duke Frederick III, and ruled as Margrave of Tuscany from 1056. He reconciled with the emperor and in 1065 regained the Duchy of Lower Lorraine from the hands of King Henry IV.

However, the line of Lower Lorraine dukes became extinct upon the assassination of his son Duke Godfrey IV the Hunchback in 1076. Though he had designated his nephew Godfrey of Bouillon, son of his sister Ida his successor, his estates were seized by Emperor Henry IV in favour of his son Conrad. Not until 1088, Godfrey of Bouillon was appointed Lower Lorraine regent.

== Genealogy of the Ardennes–Verdun dynasty ==
Gozlin, Count of Bidgau and Methingau	Oda of Metz
Adalbero, Archbishop of Reims	Godfrey the Captive	Matilda of Billung
Frederick, Count of Verdun	Herman, Count of Brabant	Adalbero, Bishop of Verdun	Godfrey the Childless	Gozelo
Boniface III, Margrave of Tuscany	Beatrice of Bar	Godfrey the Bearded	Doda	Gozelo II	Pope Stephen IX	Regelindis	Albert II, Count of Namur
Matilda of Tuscany	Godfrey the Hunchback	Ida	Eustace II, Count of Boulogne	Albert III, Count of Namur
Eustace III, Count of Boulogne	Godfrey of Bouillon	Baldwin I of Jerusalem

== Possessions and titles ==
The County of Verdun was given to Godfrey by Emperor Otto I between 944 and 951, and was held by several dynasty members over the following four generations.

The Duchies of Upper and Lower Lorraine were the result of the division of the old kingdom, later duchy of Lotharingia in 959. Following the death of the childless Duke Otto in 1012, Godfrey ΙΙ the Childless was granted the Duchy of Lower Lorraine. Godfrey was succeeded in 1023 by his brother Gozelo Ι, who also became Duke of Upper Lorraine in 1033. Both duchies were in the control of the dynasty until 1046, when the rebellions of Godfrey ΙΙΙ the Bearded led to the loss of both titles. Godfrey was finally restored to Lower Lorraine in 1065, and passed this on to his son, Godfrey the Hunchback. The Crusader Godfrey of Bouillon was a nephew of Godfrey IV the Hunchback, and the last of the dynasty to hold the Duchy.

The Castle of Bouillon is first mentioned in 988 in a letter to Godfrey Ι the Captive from his brother Adalberon, Archbishop of Reims. It is believed that this castle, and the estate connected, was an original patrimony of the dynasty. Bouillon was one of the central points of the dynasty's power, and was in their possession until it was sold by Godfrey of Bouillon to cover expenses for the First Crusade.
