= Gothelo =

Gozelo, Gotzelo, Gothelo, Gozilo or Goscelo are variant spellings of a masculine given name of Germanic origin. The French form is Gozelon. It was most common in Lotharingia in the Middle Ages. It is a variant of Gozlin, and a diminutive of Godfrey.

- Gozelo, Count of Bidgau and Methingau (died 942/3), also known as Gozlin
- Gothelo I, Duke of Lorraine (died 1044), nicknamed "the Great"
- Gothelo II of Lower Lorraine (died 1046), nicknamed "the Sluggard"
- Gozelo I, Count of Montaigu (died 1064), founder of the county of Montaigu
- Gozelo II, Count of Montaigu (died 1097), joined the First Crusade
