= Richard of Verdun =

Richard of Verdun (970–1046) was the abbot of the influential monastery of Saint-Vanne from 1004 to 1046.

== Life ==
Richard was born to a noble family of Bantheville, the son of Walter and Theodrada. As a child, he was enrolled in the cathedral school of Rheims under Archbishop Adalbero and was eventually ordained a priest. It was at Rheims that he first met Frederick, son of Godfrey I, Count of Verdun.

Richard entered the monastery of St. Vanne as a young man, and upon his arrival he was shocked and dismayed by the relatively poor state of the monastery. So great were his feelings that he had attempted to be transferred from St. Vanne, but was eventually talked out of it by Odilo of Cluny.

Through the influence of Bishop Haimo of Verdun, Richard was elected to succeed Fergenius as abbot of St. Vanne in October 1004. Due to his intimate connections with the local nobility, notably Gerard of Florennes, Bishop of Cambrai and Poppo of Stavelot, Richard was able to transform the simple monastery into a truly monumental repository of a variety of relics. His network of connections and contributors even included William the Conqueror and Robert II, Duke of Normandy. Modeling St. Vanne after Cluny Abbey, Richard undertook a number of building projects which some felt were overeager at best and needlessly wasteful and extravagant at worst. He expanded the monastery apparently to accommodate an anticipated large numbers of pilgrims. Peter Damian commented "...he had expended almost all his efforts constructing useless buildings and had wasted much of the Church's resources in such frivolities".

Despite his critics, Richard was generally well-regarded and considered to be a man knowledgeable of "...corporate religious ideals and the needs of a whole community". Like many of his Benedictine contemporaries, Richard viewed the cult of saints to be the best means of transmitting the Christian ideal to a nominally Christian populace. In fact, his most extravagant construction was built especially to house the bones of the monastery's many patron saints and former bishops. In 1026, with the financial support of Richard II, Duke of Normandy, Abbot Richard led a large pilgrimage to Jerusalem.

Many of Richard's reliquary acquisitions during his tenure as abbot of St. Vanne seem to be highly suspect; at times even illegal. According to Patrick Geary, Richard "...saw nothing contradictory or immoral about his theft or falsification of important relics". Instead, the overall spiritual power and protection that the relics of saints could offer outweighed any misgivings about the "rightness" of theft or falsification. In Richard's viewpoint, if the relic had not chosen him to acquire it, it would have interceded on behalf of its original possessors.

Due to a reputation as an effective administrator, Richard eventually came to govern twenty-one autonomous monasteries, including the Abbey of St Vaast in Arras (1008), Elnon Abbey (1013), Florennes Abbey (1015) and others. These he governed through their respective priors.

He retired to a hermitage near Remiremont Abbey, but returned to Saint-Vanne around 1039.
