= Herman of Ename =

Count Herman of Ename
- Born: after 962
- Died: 28 May 1029
- Noble family: House of Ardennes-Verdun
- Father: Godfrey I, Count of Verdun
- Mother: Matilda of Saxony

Herman (or Hezelo) of Ename (died 28 May 1029), was a count in what is now Belgium, who was responsible to the emperor for holding the frontier fort at Ename (sometimes spelled "Eename") in the Pagus of Brabant, which faced the County of Flanders in the Kingdom of France.

Herman was the third son of Godfrey "the captive", Count of Verdun and Margrave of Ename, and Matilda, who was a daughter of Herman, Duke of Saxony, and widow of Baldwin III of Flanders (died 962). Herman was therefore a member of the Verdun branch of the family referred to today as House of Ardenne. During this period this family coordinated with the bishops, who were in many cases also relatives, to enforce imperial policies in Lotharingia.

Herman fought in several important battles supporting his brother Godfrey "the childless", who was Duke of Lower Lotharingia. Another brother of theirs, Gozelon, held another Lotharingian border position against Flanders at Antwerp, and later became duke of both Lower and Upper Lotharingia. The county of their father, Verdun in Upper Lotharingia was held by another brother Frederic, but during this period it apparently came under the suzerainty of the Bishopric of Verdun. Apart from the increasing pressure coming from Flanders, the brothers also fought against the "Reginarid" family who had once held a similar position of power in Lotharingia, but were now seen as rebellious allies of Flanders. After the death of the Reginarid Lambert I, Count of Louvain, marriages were arranged between the two families.

Tensions with Flanders were not resolved during Herman's lifetime, and it is only some generations later that his Brabant lands were divided between enlarged versions of the counties of Hainaut and Flanders, which then remained as a stable situation for centuries.

== Life ==
As explained in the medieval account of the Deeds (Gesta) of the bishops of Cambrai:

Regarding the estate at Eename. There is a place located on the Scheldt River that they call Eename. In contemporary times, the venerable man Count Godfrey and his wife Mathilda, the venerable matron, constructed a fortification there and established a river port, a market, a toll, and other businesses because it was their property and was suitable for their purposes. They founded a monastery in honor of St. Mary within this stronghold and established canons there. Their son Hermann established two monasteries outside of the walls, one in honor of St. Laurence and the other in honor of the Holy Savior. Now, therefore, as we recently have learned, this place flourishes with an abundance of all things. However, it would flourish even more if it were not shaken by frequent enemy attacks. Indeed, it suffers most of all from the enemies of God because of its role in maintaining the stability of the kingdom and because of its loyalty to the emperor.

It has been proposed (for example by Wampach) that Herman might be the same man of that name who held counties in what is now Germany, in the Eifelgau in the 10th century but the identification is likely to be wrong. Other proposals have been made associating Herman with records further north in Germany, but these are also unlikely to be correct.

In 1013, Herman was present at Hoegaarden on the side of his brother Duke Godfrey the childless, defending against an attack of Lambert I, Count of Louvain on behalf of the prince-bishop of Liège. Herman was captured and placed in the custody of Robert II, Count of Namur. He was soon released due to the negotiations on his behalf by Robert's mother Ermengarde, who achieved imperial forgiveness for Robert in return.

Herman was again present with his brother Godfrey at the battle of Florennes in 1015 when their opponent Count Lambert was killed. After this success, the bishop of Cambrai, Gerard, reluctantly gave permission for Herman's daughter to marry Lambert's nephew, Reginar V, in the interests of peace.

Herman was one of the greatest benefactors to the Abbey of Saint-Vanne near Verdun. Both he and his brother Frederick became monks there and were buried there. Herman and Abbot Richard also worked towards the investiture of Herman's cousin Gerard of Florennes as Bishop of Cambrai.

Herman had a wife named Mathilde of unknown origins, and together they had at least three children who, like him and Mathilde, were interred in Saint-Vanne:

- Gregory. Hugh of Flavigny says he died young. Alperic of Trois-Fontaines says he was Archdeacon of Liège, but also calls his father a count of Dagsburg.
- Godfrey. It has been proposed that he was a Count of Westphalia and Count of Cappenberg. Johanna Maria van Winter has proposed that he died in Merwede in 1018, at the battle which imperial forces led by his uncle Godfrey lost against the count of Holland.
- Odilia, Abbess of Hohenbourg in Alsace, who died while celebrating Easter at Saint-Vanne with her parents.

Two more children are known to have buried young in Velzeke, near Ename:

- Herman
- Berthilda

And a particularly important child was his daughter:

- Mathilde de Verdun (died after 1039), married to Reginar V, Count of Mons.

Herman had one illegitimate son by an unknown mistress:

- Godefroi (died before 995).

Herman died 28 May 1029, as was recorded in the necrology of the abbey, and also the necrology of Saint Lambert in Liège.

== See also ==
- Germany and the Western Empire, Volume III of the Cambridge Medieval History, University of Cambridge, 1922
- Abbé Charles Nicolas Gabriel, Verdun, Notice historique, 1888, réédition 1993
- Poull, Georges, La maison souveraine et ducale de Bar, Presses Universitaires de Nancy, 1994
- Crowe, Eyre Evans, The History of France, London: Longman, Brown, 1858

== Biography ==
- Healy, Patrick (2013), The Chronicle of Hugh of Flavigny: Reform and the Investiture Contest in the Late Eleventh Century, ISBN 9781409479574
- Parisse, Michel (1981), "Généalogie de la Maison d'Ardenne", La maison d'Ardenne Xe-XIe siècles. Actes des Journées Lotharingiennes, 24 - 26 oct. 1980, Centre Univ., Luxembourg - Luxembourg, pp. 9–41
- van Winter, Johanna Maria (2010a), "'Reginmuod que dicitur Emese', twee middeleeuwse dames in de spiegel van recente literatuur", Veluwse en andere geschiedenissen. Liber amicorum drs. R. M. Kemperink, pp. 29–38 [Has been republished in van Winter 2017.]
- van Winter, Johanna Maria (2010b), "Mittelreichisches Friesland, eine Markgrafschaft?", Jaarboek voor Middeleeuwse Geschiedenis, 13: 33–57 [Has been republished in Dutch in van Winter 2017.]
- van Winter, Johanna Maria (2017), Middeleeuwers in drievoud: hun woonplaats, verwantschap en voeding

Medieval

- Hugh of Flavigny, Chronicon, https://www.dmgh.de/mgh_ss_8/index.htm
- Gesta episcoporum Cameracensium:

- Latin MGH edition: Bethmann, Ludwig Conrad, ed. (1846), Gesta episcoporum Cameracensium, MGH Scriptores, vol. 7
- English translation: Bachrach, David S; Bachrach, Bernard S; Leese, Michael, Deeds of the Bishops of Cambrai, Translation and Commentary
