= Matilda of Saxony =

Matilda of Saxony may refer to:

- Matilda of Ringelheim (c. 892–968), also known as Saint Matilda, a Saxon noblewoman
- Matilda of Saxony, countess of Flanders (c. 935-942 – 1008)
- Matilda, Princess-Abbess of Quedlinburg (955 – 999), daughter of Otto I, Holy Roman Emperor, and Adelaide of Italy
- Matilda of Germany, Countess Palatine of Lotharingia (979–1025), daughter of Otto II and Theophanu
- Matilda of England, Duchess of Saxony (1156 – 1189), eldest daughter of Henry II of England and Eleanor of Aquitaine; wife of Henry the Lion
- Matilda of Saxony (1172-1209/10), Countess of Perche and Lady of Coucy, from the German Welf dynasty; niece of Richard the Lionheart
