= Ida of Lorraine =

French noblewoman and saint (c. 1040–1113)

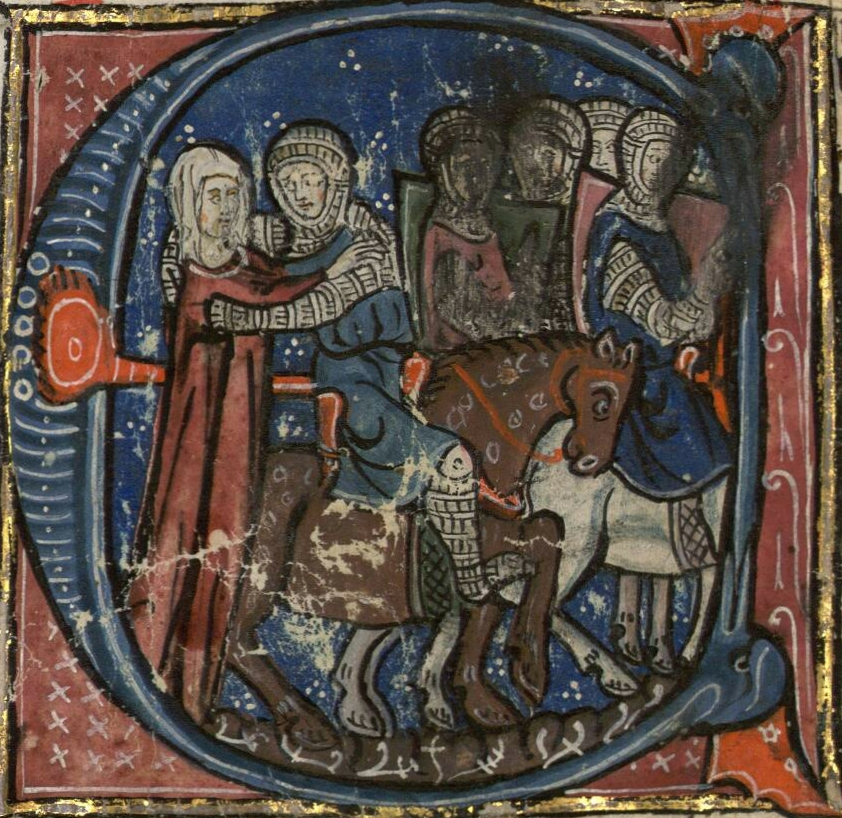
- Born: c. 1040
- Died: 13 April 1113 (aged 72–73)
- Noble family: House of Ardennes-Verdun
- Spouse: Eustace II of Boulogne
- Issue: Eustace III; Godfrey of Bouillon; Baldwin I; Ida
- Parents: Godfrey III, Duke of Lower Lorraine; Doda

Ida of Lorraine (also referred to as Blessed Ida of Boulogne) (c. 1040 – 13 April 1113) was a saint and noblewoman.

She was the daughter of Godfrey III, Duke of Lower Lorraine and his wife Doda. Ida's grandfather was Gothelo I, Duke of Lorraine and Ida's brother was Godfrey IV, Duke of Lower Lorraine.

== Family ==
In 1049, Ida married Eustace II, Count of Boulogne. They had three sons and one daughter:

- Eustace III, the next Count of Boulogne
- Godfrey of Bouillon, first ruler of Kingdom of Jerusalem
- Baldwin, second ruler of Kingdom of Jerusalem
- Ida of Boulogne, (Note: Ferdinand Holbock states Ida of Lorraine had only three sons.) (Note: Heather Tanner chooses to believe Ida of Boulogne is Ida of Lorraine's daughter, while citing that C.G. Roland rejects this idea stating instead that Conon's wife Ida was the daughter of Lambert of Fouron.) has also been postulated. She was married first to Herman von Malsen and second to Conon, Count of Montaigu.

Ida shunned the use of a wet-nurse in raising her children. Instead, she breast-fed them to ensure that they were not contaminated by the wet-nurse's morals, i.e. her mode of living. When her sons went on the First Crusade, Ida contributed heavily to their expenses.

== Life ==
Ida was always religiously and charitably active, but the death of her husband provided her wealth and the freedom to use it for her own projects. She founded several monasteries:

- Saint-Wulmer in Boulogne-sur-Mer
- Our Lady of the Chapel, Calais
- Saint-Bertin
- Abbey of Cappelle
- Abbey of Le Wast

She maintained a correspondence with Anselm of Canterbury. Some of Anselm's letters to Ida have survived.

She became increasingly involved in church life. However, current scholarship feels that she did not actually become a Benedictine Nun, but that she was a "Secular Oblate of the Benedictine Order".

== Death and burial ==
Ida died on 13 April 1113, which is the date she is honoured. Traditionally, her burial place has been ascribed to the monastery of Le Wast. Her remains were moved in 1669 to Paris and again in 1808 to Bayeux.

Her life story was written by a contemporary monk of the monastery of Le Wast.

She is venerated in Bayeux.

== Sources ==
- Butler, Alban; Burns, Paul (2000). Butler's Lives of the Saints. Continuum International Publishing Group. ISBN 0-86012-253-0.
- Holböck, Ferdinand (2002). Married Saints and Blesseds: Through the Centuries. Ignatius Press. ISBN 9780898708431.
- Tanner, Heather (2004). Families, Friends, and Allies: Boulogne and Politics in Northern France and England c. 879-1160. Boulogne-sur-Mer (France): BRILL. ISBN 90-04-13243-0.
- Vaughn, Sally N. (1990). "St. Anselm and Women". Haskins Society Journal. 2. University of South Carolina: 83–94. ISBN 1-85285-059-0.
