= Frederick, Count of Verdun =

- Born: c. 970
- Died: 6 January 1022
- Noble family: House of Ardennes-Verdun
- Father: Godfrey I, Count of Verdun
- Mother: Matilda of Saxony

Frederick (Frédéric) (c. 970/976 – January 1022), Count of Verdun (988–1022), Count of Castres (1000–1022), and Provost of Saint-Vaast. Frederick was part of the Ardennes-Verdun dynasty, and the eldest son of Godfrey I the Prisoner, Count of Verdun, and Matilda, daughter of Herman, Duke of Saxony of the Billung family, and a widow of Baldwin III of Flanders.

Frederick was among those captured along with his father in 985 when Lothair of France attacked Verdun in 985. He was released in 987 by family ally Hugh Capet, then Duke of the Franks (dux et princeps Francorum). In 988, Frederick worked to bring the body of his brother Adalberon, Bishop of Verdun, who died in Italy, to be buried in the Verdun Cathedral.

It is uncertain how long Frederic remained as Count in Verdun as the charter dated 17 Aug 1156 of Emperor Friedrich I Barbarossa indicates that the County of Verdun was transferred to the Bishop of Verdun during the reign of Emperor Otto III. However, a charter dated 1020, under which Haimont, Bishop of Verdun, confirmed an exchange of property, names domni Frederici…comes nostre civitatis, which suggests that Frederic continued as count at least in part of the county. A 1020 charter of Abbot Richard demonstrates that Frederick must have resigned the countship soon after, as it refers to temporis dominus Fredericus qui comes Virdunensis civitatis fuerat.

Frederick was also Count of Castres, as shown by the charter dated 5 May 1005 under which Henry II, then King of Germany, granted market rights at Doncheria…in comitatu…Frederici comitis…Castricensis to the Abbey Saint-Médard de Soissons.

It is not known who his wife or wives were. He apparently had a daughter Sophie (born c. 1010) who married Louis II, Count of Chiny. Louis' father, a successor of Frederick's as count, was murdered by Frederick's brother Gothelo.

In 1020, near the end of his life, Frederick gave up his title and became a monk at Saint-Vanne Abbey. (Note: Patrick Healy doesn't give a year, just states Frederick lived out his life as a monk at St. Vanne Abbey) He was succeeded as Count of Verdun by his brother Herman. It is unclear who, if anyone, succeeded him as Count of Castres.

== Sources ==
- Healy, Patrick (2016). The Chronicle of Hugh of Flavigny: Reform and the Investiture Contest in the Late Eleventh Century. Ashgate Publishing Limited. ISBN 9781317038467.
- Tanner, Heather (2004). Families, Friends and Allies: Boulogne and Politics in Northern France and England, C.879-1160. Brill. ISBN 9789047402558.
