= Gerard of Florennes =

Medieval nobleman and Bishop of Cambrai

Gerard of Florennes (ca 975, bishop 1012 – 14 March 1051), bishop of Cambrai as Gerard I, had formerly been chaplain to Henry II, Holy Roman Emperor, and helpful to the latter in his political negotiations with Robert the Pious, King of France. In 1024 Gerard called a synod in Arras to confront a purported heresy fomented by the Gundulfian heretics, who denied the efficacy of the Eucharist. The records of this synod, the Acta Synodi Atrebatensis, preserve a summary of orthodox Christian doctrine of the early eleventh century, as well contemporary peace-making practices. According to this text's author, the heretics were convinced by Gerard's explanation of orthodoxy, renounced their heresy, and were reconciled with the church.

Gerard was apparently a member of the high nobility of the Low Countries. He was the second son of Arnold, seigneur of Florennes in the county of Namur, who was the son of a Count Godfrey, count of Hainaut, possibly Godfrey I, Duke of Lower Lorraine. His mother was Ermentrude, daughter of Count Godfrey "the captive".

He was a student of the great Gerbert of Aurillac, the leading theologian of the tenth century, and a supporter of the monastic reformer Richard of Verdun, abbot of Saint-Vanne. Between 1002 and 1010, while he was a canon at Reims he founded the Abbey of St John the Baptist on his father's estate at Florennes, with Richard as its first abbot.

At Florennes, on 12 September 1015, Godfrey II, Duke of Lower Lorraine, whose appointment Gerard had recommended to the Emperor, defeated both of his rivals, Lambert I, Count of Leuven, brother-in-law of Otto, and Reginar IV, count of Mons killing Lambert and forcing Reginar to make peace.

In 1015, Gerard transferred the abbey of Florennes to the church of Liège. drawing together a community of monks from Verdun. Texts from the scriptorium show the innovative separation of words with spaces.

Gerard was the earliest known theorist to provide a justification of the division of European society into "three estates". Writing between 1023 and 1025, he observed, in the words of Georges Duby, "that there were distinctions between men, an essential inequality which could be compensated only by charity, mercy and mutual service" within the framework of divinely ordained natural law.

In addition to his role in the Investiture Controversy, Gerard was a voice in the implementation of the Peace and Truce of God movement to limit warfare. At Douai in 1024 he introduced the Peace into Flanders at the urging of Count Baldwin IV, he himself apparently having reservations. In 1025 he criticised Reginard, recently appointed as bishop of Liège, for simply releasing suspected heretics after they had made an orthodox declaration of faith, and for allowing somebody excommunicated in Cambrai to be buried in consecrated ground in Liège.

During his episcopacy, the cathedral of Notre-Dame de Cambrai was reconsecrated on 18 October 1030.

In 1023–25, Gerard was working on his Vita Gaugerici, a life of Gaugericus, one of the early bishops of Cambrai. He made extensive use of the library of Marchiennes, a former nunnery converted into a male monastery in 1024. Its abbot, Leduin, was a close ally of Gerard's in the campaign for monastic reform in the diocese. Leduin possessed a manuscript, used by Gerard, containing Gregory the Great's Regula pastoralis and extracts from Taius of Zaragoza's De malorum concordia, and Bachiarius' De paenitentia.

== Editions ==
- S. Vanderputten. D.J. Reilly (ed.), Gerardus Cameracensis. Acta Synodi Atrebatensis, Vita Autberti, Vita Gaugerici; Varia scripta ex officina Gerardi exstantia (= Corpus Christianorum. Continuatio Mediaevalis 270), Turnhout: Brepols Publishers, 2014 (ISBN 978-2-503-55255-2)
