= Abbey of Saint-Vaast =

Abbey in France

Saint Vaast Abbey
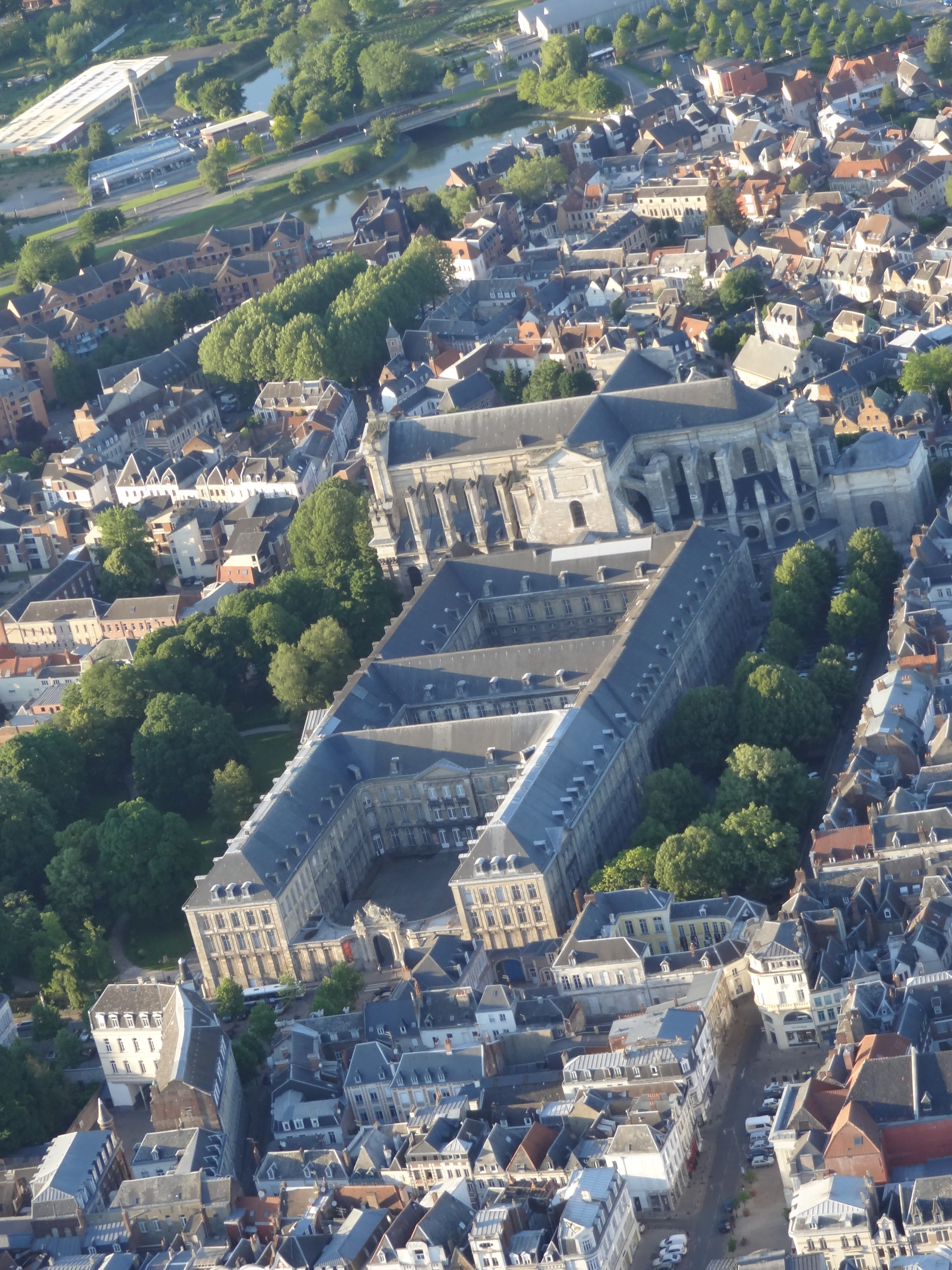
- The Abbey of Saint-Vaast
- Interactive map of Saint Vaast Abbey

Monastery information
- Other name: Abbaye de Saint-Vaast
- Order: Benedictine

Site
- Location: Arras, Pas-de-Calais
- Country: France
- Coordinates: 50°17′31″N 2°46′24″E

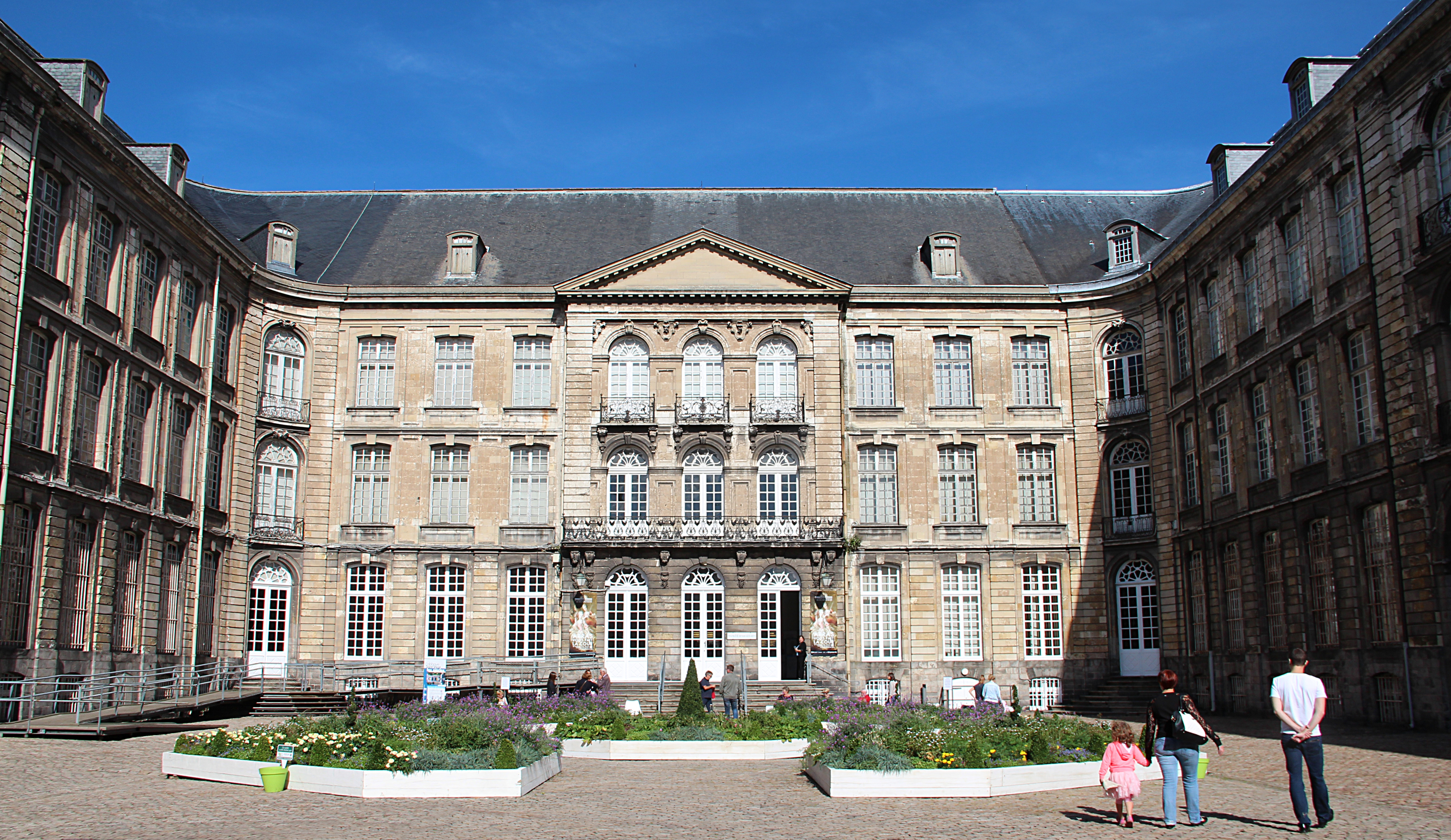
Abbey of St Vaast (facade on the entrance courtyard)

The Abbey of St Vaast (French: Abbaye de Saint-Vaast) was a Benedictine monastery situated in Arras, département of Pas-de-Calais, France.

== History ==
The abbey was founded in 667. Saint Vedast, or Vaast (c. 453–540) was the first Bishop of Arras and was buried in the old cathedral at Arras. In 667, Saint Aubert, seventh Bishop of Arras, began to build an abbey for Benedictine monks on the site of a little chapel which Saint Vedast had erected in honour of Saint Peter. Vedast's relics were transferred to the new abbey, which was completed by Auburt's successor and generously endowed by King Theuderic III, who together with his wife was afterwards buried there.

The Abbey burned down in 783, but was subsequently rebuilt. By 867, a vicus monasterii had grown up around the monastery, inhabited by people employed in various crafts such as bakers, brewers, and smiths who provided services to the abbey. Under a charter of Charles the Bald, seven manors were required to supply the abbey with flax and wool.

In 1008, Richard of Verdun. abbot of Saint-Vanne, became abbot of Saint-Vaast, as well, which he governed through the prior. He was notorious for acquiring relics, some of dubious provenance. The abbey purportedly held the head of Saint James, which attracted pilgrims.

It was at this time that the Saint-Vaast Bible was produced by the abbey scriptorium. It is illuminated with narrative scenes before various books.

The Abbey of St Vaast was of great importance amongst the monasteries of the Low Countries. Between 1433 and 1435, Abbot Jean de Clercq commissioned Jacques Daret to paint an altarpiece for the abbey church. The four panels depict the Visitation, the Nativity, the Adoration of the Magi, and the Presentation in the Temple, all now dispersed among various museums.

The Abbey was exempt from episcopal jurisdiction and maintained its independence until 1778, when it was aggregated to the Congregation of Cluny. At the French Revolution it was suppressed and the monastic buildings were used first as a hospital and then as barracks. In 1838 the premises were purchased by the town; part was used as a museum and archive, and the rest as the residence of the bishop. The abbey church, which had been desecrated and partially destroyed, was rebuilt and consecrated in 1833 and now serves as the cathedral of Arras, substituting for the former Gothic cathedral destroyed during the Revolution. The abbey buildings now house the Musée des beaux-arts d'Arras.

== Burials ==
- Theuderic III
- Clotilda of Herstal (650–699), his wife
- Ida of Lorraine (d. 1113)

== See also ==
- Annales Vedastini, the Carolingian-era annals of the abbey
