= Matilda of Saxony, Countess of Flanders =

Matilda of Saxony
- Imaginary portrait by Arent van Wijnendale, 16th century

Countess consort of Flanders
- Born: c. 935–942
- Died: 25 May 1008 (age about 70); Ghent
- Spouse: Baldwin III, Count of Flanders; Godfrey I, Count of Verdun
- Issue: Arnulf II, Count of Flanders; Frederick, Count of Verdun; Godfrey II, Duke of Lower Lorraine; Herman of Ename; Gothelo I, Duke of Lorraine
- House: Billung
- Father: Hermann Billung

Matilda of Saxony (Old High German: Mechthild, Latin: Mathildis, French: Mathilde de Saxe; c. 935–942 – 25 May 1008) was a medieval Saxon noblewoman who became countess of Flanders by marriage to Baldwin III, Count of Flanders.

== Life ==
Matilda was the daughter of Hermann Billung. She first married Baldwin III, count of Flanders. They had:

- Arnulf II, Count of Flanders

After Baldwin's death, Matilda married Godfrey I, Count of Verdun. They had:

- Frederick (d. 1022), count of Verdun
- Godfrey (d. 1023), duke of Lower Lorraine (1012–1023)
- Adalberon (d. 988), bishop of Verdun (984–988)
- Herman of Ename (d. 1024), count of Brabant (retired as a monk in the abbey of Verdun abt. 1022)
- Gothelo (d. 1044), margrave of Antwerp, duke of Lower (1023–1044) and later also Upper (1033–1044) Lorraine
- Ermengarde (d. 1042), married Otto of Hammerstein, count in the Wettergau
- Ermentrude, married Arnold de Rumigny (d. 1010), lord of Florennes
- Adela, married Count Godizo of Aspelt. Their daughter Irmgard married Berthold von Walbeck, son of Lothair I, Margrave of the Nordmark.

Matilda died on 25 May 1008 and was buried in Ghent.

== Bibliography ==
- Healy, Patrick (2006). The Chronicle of Hugh of Flavigny: Reform and the Investiture Contest in the Late Eleventh Century. Ashgate Publishing Limited.
- Tanner, Heather (2004). Families, Friends and Allies: Boulogne and Politics in Northern France and England, c.879-1160. Brill.

Preceded by Adele of Vermandois	Countess consort of Flanders; 958–962	Succeeded by Rozala of Italy
