= Conrad II of Italy =

Conrad II
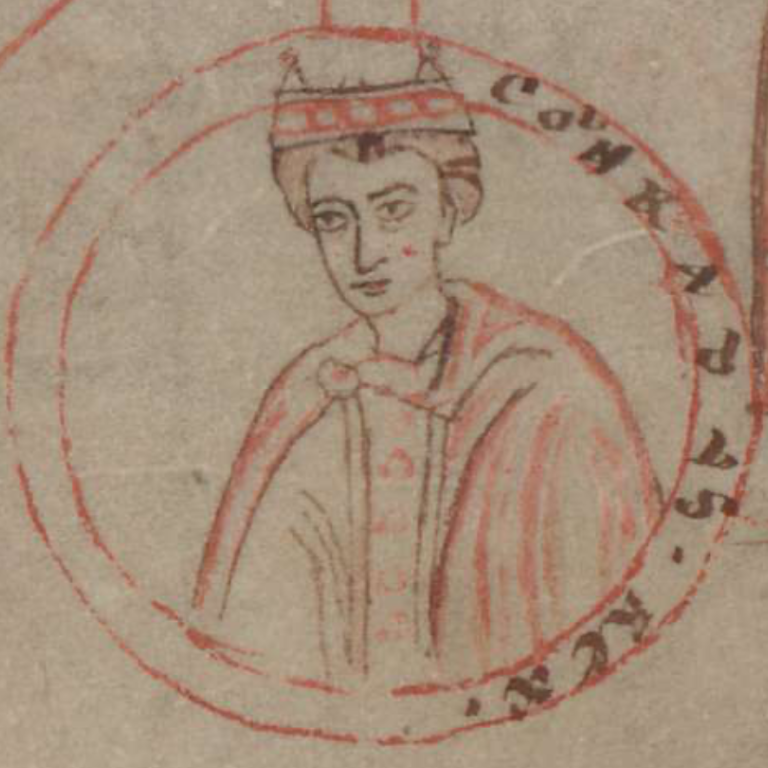
- Conrad depicted as king in a manuscript of the early 13th century

Duke of Lower Lorraine
- Reign: 1076–1087
- Predecessor: Godfrey IV
- Successor: Godfrey V

King of Germany (Formally King of the Romans)
- Reign: 1087–1098
- Predecessor: Henry IV
- Successor: Henry V

King of Italy
- Reign: 1093–1098
- Predecessor: Henry IV
- Successor: Henry V
- Born: 12 February 1074; Hersfeld Abbey, Hersfeld, Rhenish Franconia, Holy Roman Empire
- Died: 27 July 1101 (aged 27); Florence, March of Tuscany, Kingdom of Italy, Holy Roman Empire
- Burial: Santa Reparata, Florence
- Spouse: Constance, daughter of Roger I of Sicily (m. 1095)
- Dynasty: Salian
- Father: Henry IV, Holy Roman Emperor
- Mother: Bertha of Savoy
- Religion: Roman Catholicism

Conrad II of Italy, also known as Conrad (III) (Note: The numbering "Conrad II" is typical of older sources, such as L. A. Muratori, who counted the Emperor Conrad II as Conrad I of Italy. "Conrad (III)" indicates the number he would have had were he counted as a full king of Germany on analogy with Henry (VII) of Germany.) (12 February 1074 – 27 July 1101), was the Duke of Lower Lorraine (1076–1087), King of Germany (1087–1098) and King of Italy (1093–1098). He was the second son of Holy Roman Emperor Henry IV and Bertha of Savoy, and their eldest son to reach adulthood, his older brother Henry having been born and died in the same month of August 1071. Conrad's rule in Lorraine and Germany was nominal. He spent most of his life in Italy and there he was king in fact as well as in name.

== Childhood ==
Conrad was born on 12 February 1074 at Hersfeld Abbey while his father was fighting against the Saxon rebellion. He was baptised in the abbey three days later. After Henry's victory against the Saxons, he arranged for an assembly at Goslar on Christmas Day 1075 to swear an oath recognising Conrad as his successor. After the death of Duke Godfrey IV of Lower Lorraine on 22 February 1076, Henry refused to appoint the late duke's own choice of successor, his nephew, Godfrey of Bouillon, and instead named his two-year-old son Duke of Lower Lorraine. He did appoint Albert III of Namur, the deceased duke's brother-in-law, as his son's vice-duke (vicedux) to perform the daily functions of government. He also allowed the march of Antwerp to pass to Godfrey of Bouillon. The total absence of Conrad from his duchy caused or abetted the decline of ducal authority in it. In 1082, while Conrad was in Italy, the peace of God was introduced into the diocese of Liège.

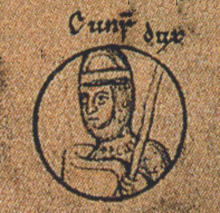
Conrad II depicted as Duke of Lower Lorraine (the caption reads Cunr[adus] dux) in a family tree of the Holy Roman Emperors from a late 12th-century manuscript

Conrad passed Christmas 1076 at Besançon with his parents. Early the next year (1077) he accompanied his father across the Alps on the way to Canossa, because there was nobody in Germany to which Henry could entrust his son. Conrad subscribed to his first royal charter in 1079. When Henry returned to Germany, Conrad remained in Italy to act as a pledge to the imperialist party there. He was placed in the care of Archbishop Tedald of Milan and Bishop Denis of Piacenza, both excommunicated prelates and opponents of Pope Gregory VII. In October 1080, Conrad was present in the camp when a force from northern Italy defeated the troops of Marchioness Matilda of Tuscany near Mantua.

In December 1080, the Saxon lords who had supported the kingship of the late Rudolf of Swabia against Henry gathered "to discuss the state of their kingdom [Saxony]" in Bruno of Merseburg's words. Henry sent envoys to the Saxons asking them to accept his son Conrad as their king, and in exchange he promised never to enter Saxony. (Conrad was apparently back in Germany.) Otto of Northeim, speaking for the Saxons, "desired neither the son nor the father" since he had "often seen a bad calf begotten by a bad ox."

In 1081, Henry entered Italy, where he endeavoured to wed his son to a daughter of Robert Guiscard, Duke of Apulia. He offered Robert the march of Fermo as well, but no marriage could be agreed to since the duke refused to do homage for Apulia. Again Henry left Conrad in Italy (July 1081), this time in the care of the lay princes "to watch over the province for him", according to the Annales Brunwilarenses and Annales Patherbrunnenses.

== Salian king ==
In 1087, Conrad returned to Germany. On 30 May, he was crowned king in Aachen by Archbishop Sigewin of Cologne. The ceremony was attended by Albert of Namur, Godfrey of Bouillon and Duke Magnus of Saxony, according to the Annales Weissenburgenses. The last reference to Conrad as duke of Lower Lotharingia (dux Lothariorum) comes from a charter issued at Aachen shortly before his coronation, after which Henry appointed Godfrey of Bouillon duke in his place. By January 1088 Conrad had returned to Italy, with Bishop Ogerius of Ivrea as his chancellor and advisor. Shortly after his return to Italy, his mother died. The passing of Bertha perhaps provoked the rupture between Conrad and his father.

In Italy, Conrad was unsuccessful in resisting Matilda of Tuscany until his father came down in the spring of 1090. In 1091 he was at his father's side, as his "most beloved son". On 19 December 1091 Conrad's grandmother, the Margravine Adelaide of Turin, died. She had named her ten-year-old great-grandson, Peter, as her heir following the death of Peter's father, Count Frederick of Montbéliard on 29 June 1091. Henry, however, declared Conrad the rightful heir and placed him in charge of the march. The southern counties meanwhile were seized by Boniface I of Vasto and Henry granted the county of Asti to the bishop elect Oddo. Throughout 1092 Conrad was campaigning in the march of Turin to establish imperial control.

== Rebellion ==
In 1093, with the support of Matilda and her husband, Welf V, along with the Patarene-minded cities of northern Italy (Cremona, Lodi, Milan and Piacenza), Conrad rebelled against his father. According to Ekkehard of Aura, he was instigated to revolt by "one of his father's ministeriales, who was likewise named Conrad". This was perhaps the same person as the Count Conrad sent by the young king as an envoy to King Roger II of Sicily, according to Geoffrey Malaterra. Ekkehard otherwise gives positive account of Conrad's motivation, describing him as "a thoroughly catholic man, most devoted to the apostolic see, inclining to religion rather than government or war ... well enough furnished with courage and boldness [yet] prefer[ring] to occupy his time with reading rather than with sports". Other sources favorable to Conrad include the Annales sancti Disibodi and the Casus monasterii Petrishusensis. Among sources unfavorable to him are the Annales Augustani and Henry IV's anonymous biography, the Vita Heinrici IV, which describes Conrad as a pawn in hands of Matilda of Tuscany. Bernold of St Blasien records that Henry was so abject after Conrad's rebellion that he attempted suicide, but this may be a hyperbole allusive to the suicide of the biblical King Saul.

In mid-March Conrad was captured by his father through a ruse, but soon escaped and in late July was elected king by Matilda, Welf and their allies and crowned in Milan by Archbishop Anselm III. According to the historian Landulf Junior, he was also crowned at Monza, where the Iron Crown was being kept. After Conrad's coronation, Anselm died and the new king invested his successor, Arnulf III on 6 December 1093, although many of the bishops present to celebrate his coronation refused to attend the investiture of Arnulf, accusing him of simony. The papal legate who was present, probably to speak with Conrad, immediately declared Arnulf deposed. The accusation might have been that Arnulf had performed undue service to Conrad to secure his investiture, or that he had been too obeisant, a charge of simony ab obsequio. Conrad was at the height of his power in 1094, when his father was staying with Margrave Henry and Patriarch Udalric in the March of Verona, unable to enter Italy. His antipope, Clement III, elected at the Synod of Brixen in 1080, who was travelling with him, even offered to resign so that Henry could negotiate with Pope Urban II if that was all that stood in the way. There is a contemporary tract, Altercatio inter Urbanum et Clementum, arguing the two popes claims should be adjudicated by a council.

== Papal anti-king ==
In March 1095 Conrad attended the Council of Piacenza and confirmed the accusations of his stepmother, Eupraxia, that Henry IV was a member of a Nicolaitan sect, participated in orgies, and had offered Eupraxia to Conrad, stating that this was the reason for his turning against his father. Shortly after the council, he swore an oath of loyalty to Pope Urban II on 10 April at Cremona and served as the pope's strator (groom), leading the pope's horse as a symbolic gesture of humility first performed, according to tradition, by Constantine I. The duty of the strator had not been performed for a pope since the ninth century, and was revived specifically for Conrad. On 15 April, in a second meeting at Cremona, Conrad swore an oath, either of "security" or of "fealty", to the pope, guaranteeing the "life, limb and Roman papacy" to Urban. This oath was customary for kings who would be crowned emperor, but Conrad went further and promised to forsake lay investiture. Urban in turn promised Conrad "his advice and aid in obtaining the kingship and the crown of the empire", probably a promise to crown him in the future, after he had control of the kingdom. By these actions Conrad transformed himself from a rebellious son to a papally-sponsored anti-king and supporter of the Reform movement.

In the same year, the pope and Matilda of Tuscany helped arrange a marriage of Conrad to Constance (also called Matilda), a daughter of Count Roger I of Sicily. Constance, escorted by Bishop Robert II of Troina, arrived at Pisa with a large fleet and a dowry of "many gifts of treasure". The wedding took place in Pisa in 1095. That same year, Matilda of Tuscany divorced Welf V, whose enraged father, Welf IV, switched allegiance and was restored to the duchy of Bavaria by the emperor in 1096. In 1097, Margrave Adalbert Azzo II died and his vast lands were disputed by his sons. Fulk and Hugh were supporters of Conrad, while Welf IV had sided with the emperor. In a sign of the turning tide, Welf, with the help of Patriarch Udalric and Duke Henry of Carinthia, invaded Italy and secured his claims to the inheritance. This reduced Conrad to total reliance on Matilda of Tuscany.

== Loss of support ==
Early during the episcopate of Anselm IV of Milan, Conrad lost the support of the papalists in Lombardy. He once rhetorically asked Liutprand, one of the leaders of the Pataria, "Since you are a teacher of Patarenes, what do you think of bishops and priests who possess royal rights and present not food to the king?" Without Matilda's support, Conrad became a supporter of the Pataria. The historian Landulf Junior praised Conrad for refusing investiture to neither Arimanno da Gavardo, the bishop-elect of Brescia, nor to Anselm IV.

In April or May 1098 at an assembly held in Mainz, Conrad's father had him formally deposed and his younger brother, Henry V, elected in his place. In a letter of 1106, Henry admitted that Henry V's election had been opposed by many and that he "fear[ed] that there would be civil war between the two brothers and that a great disaster would befall the kingdom."

After this, Conrad could hardly influence political events in Italy. There is no record that Urban or his successor had any contact with him, or that his father-in-law ever sent him support beyond his daughter's dowry. He died unexpectedly of a fever at the age of twenty-seven on 27 July 1101 in Florence. There were reports of poisoning. He was buried in Santa Reparata in Florence, now superseded by Santa Maria del Fiore. Miracles were said to have accompanied his funeral. According to Ekkehard of Aura, "the sign of the cross [appeared] on the arm" of Conrad's corpse, a clear indication that he was a crusader in spirit. Ekkehard also states that Conrad never tolerated any slander against his father, and always referred to him as lord and emperor.

== Sources ==
- Cowdrey, H. E. J. (1968). "The Succession of the Archbishops of Milan in the Time of Pope Urban II". The English Historical Review. 83 (327): 285–94. doi:10.1093/ehr/lxxxiii.cccxxvii.285.
- Fonsega, Cosimo Damiano (1962). "Arnolfo". Dizionario Biografico degli Italiani (in Italian). Vol. 4: Arconati–Bacaredda. Rome: Istituto dell'Enciclopedia Italiana. OCLC 883370.
- Fuhrmann, Horst (1986). Germany in the High Middle Ages, c. 1050–1200. Cambridge: Cambridge University Press.
- Gawlik, Alfred (1980). "Konrad (deutscher König)". Neue Deutsche Biographie (in German). Vol. 12. Berlin: Duncker & Humblot. pp. 496–496. (.html full text online).
- Lindner, Theodor (1882). "Konrad" . Allgemeine Deutsche Biographie (in German). Vol. 16. Leipzig: Duncker & Humblot. pp. 554–556.
- Robinson, Ian S. (2000). Henry IV of Germany. New York: Cambridge University Press.
- Wilson, Peter (2016). Heart of Europe: A History of the Holy Roman Empire. Cambridge, MA: Belknap Press.

Conrad II of Italy Salian dynasty Born: 1074 Died: 1101
Regnal titles
Preceded by Godfrey IV	Duke of Lower Lorraine; 1076–1087	Succeeded by Godfrey V
Preceded by Henry IV	King of Germany; 1087–1098	Succeeded by Henry V
Preceded by Henry IV	King of Italy; 1093–1098	Succeeded by Henry V
