= Otto, Duke of Lower Lorraine =

Duke of Lower Lorraine

Otto I of Lower Lotharingia
- Duke of Lower Lotharinia
- Tenure: 993-1012
- Predecessor: Charles, Duke of Lower Lorraine
- Successor: Godfrey II, Duke of Lower Lorraine
- Noble family: Carolingian
- Father: Charles, Duke of Lower Lorraine
- Mother: Adelaide of Troyes

Otto (c. 970–1012) was the duke of Lower Lorraine in the Kingdom Germany from 993 until his death. He was the son of Charles, son of King Louis IV of France, and his first wife, Adelaide of Troyes.

When his father left the duchy to fight Hugh Capet for the throne of France in 987, he became regent in Lower Lorraine when still apparently under twenty. Charles was defeated definitively in 991 and died two years later a prisoner in Orléans. Otto then succeeded into the full dukedom. In 1002, at the death of the Holy Roman Emperor Otto III, he was one of the loyal nobles who accompanied his body from Paterno to Aachen. According to the Chronica of Sigebert de Gembloux, he died in 1006, but he seems to be alive as late as 1012, when Count Godfrey II of Verdun succeeded to the duchy.

== Sources ==
- Settipani, Christian. La préhistoire des Capétiens: 481-987. 1993. ISBN 2-9501509-3-4

Preceded by Charles	Duke of Lower Lorraine; 993–1012	Succeeded by Godfrey II
