= Godfrey the Captive =

Frankish nobleman (died 1002)

- Died: 1002
- Noble family: House of Ardennes-Verdun
- Spouse: Matilda of Saxony
- Issue Detail: Frederick of Lorraine; Godfrey II, Duke of Lower Lorraine; Adalberon, Bishop of Verdun; Gothelo I, Duke of Lorraine
- Father: Gozlin, Count of Bidgau and Methingau
- Mother: Oda of Metz

Godfrey the Captive (French: Godefroid I^{er} de Verdun, le Captif; d. 1002), also called the Prisoner or the Old (le Vieux), was the count of Bidgau and Methingau from 959 and the count of Verdun 963 to his death. In 969, he obtained the Margraviate of Antwerp and Ename. Between 974 and 998, he was also the count of Hainault and Mons.

He was the founder of the House of Ardennes-Verdun, a cadet branch of the House of Ardennes. He was always loyal to the Ottonians, to whom he was related through his maternal grandmother.

== Life ==
Upper Lorraine and its surrounding area in the 11th century. The green areas are part of the Holy Roman Empire, the pale yellow area is France, and the deep yellow area is the Kingdom of Burgundy.

Godfrey was the son of Gozlin, Count of Bidgau and Methingau, and Oda of Metz. He was the brother of Adalberon, Archbishop of Reims, who crowned Hugh Capet the king of France.

Godfrey is styled as Count by the grace of God of in 963 and already count of Bidgau and Methingau through inheritance since 959. In 974, he became count of Mons, and Hainault jointly with Arnold, Count of Valenciennes, after the fall of Reginar III. Charles, Duke of Lower Lorraine, was a supporter of Reginar and defeated Godfrey and Arnold at Mons in 976, where the former was captured.

After his release, Godfrey was at the side of the Emperor Otto II fighting Lothair of France at Verdun in 985, but he was again taken captive, along with his son Frederick, and held several years. He was released in 987 by Hugh Capet, whose political ally was Bishop Adalberon, Godfrey's brother, who had crowned Hugh. Godfrey continued to be an enemy of Charles of Lower Lorraine, Hugh's Carolingian rival.

In 989, Godfrey was made prisoner a third time by Herbert III of Vermandois. He was liberated before 995, when he appears at the synod of Mousson. In 998, he lost his Hainault portion (the county of Mons) to Reginar IV.

== Family ==
In 963, Godfrey married Matilda, daughter of Herman, Duke of Saxony, of the Billung family, a widow of Baldwin III of Flanders. He had the following issue:

- Frederick (d. 1022), count of Verdun
- Godfrey (d. 1023), duke of Lower Lorraine (1012–1023)
- Adalberon (d. 988), bishop of Verdun (984–988)
- Herman of Ename (d. 1024), count of Brabant (retired as a monk in the abbey of Verdun abt. 1022)
- Gothelo (d. 1044), margrave of Antwerp, duke of Lower (1023–1044) and later also Upper (1033–1044) Lorraine
- Ermengarde (d. 1042), married Otto of Hammerstein, count in the Wettergau
- Probably Ermentrude, who married Arnold de Rumigny (d. 1010), lord of Florennes
- Adela, married Count Godizo of Aspelt. Their daughter Irmgard married Berthold von Walbeck, son of Lothair I, Margrave of the Nordmark.

== Notes ==
Godfrey the Captive House of Ardennes-Verdun Died: 1002
Preceded by Reginar IV	Count of Mons; 974–998	Succeeded by Reginar IV
New title	Margrave of Antwerp; 969–1002	Succeeded by Gothelo I
Preceded by Rudolf	Count of Verdun; 963–1002	Succeeded by Godfrey II
