= Godfrey the Bearded =

Lotharingian nobleman (c. 997–1069)

- Born: c. 997
- Died: 24 December 1069 (age 72); Verdun
- Noble family: House of Ardennes-Verdun
- Spouses: Doda; Beatrice of Bar
- Issue: Godfrey; Ida of Lorraine; Wiltrude
- Father: Gothelo I, Duke of Lorraine

Godfrey III (Note: He is sometimes counted as Godfrey II of Lower Lorraine and Godfrey I of Tuscany.) (c. 997 – 1069), called the Bearded, was the eldest son of Gothelo I, Duke of Upper and Lower Lorraine.

== Biography ==
=== Disputed succession ===
By inheritance, Godfrey was Count of Verdun and he became Margrave of Antwerp as a vassal of the Duke of Lower Lorraine. The Holy Roman Emperor Henry III authorized him to succeed his father as Duke of Upper Lorraine in 1044, but refused him the ducal title in Lower Lorraine, for he feared the power of a united duchy. Instead, Henry threatened to appoint his younger brother, Gothelo, as Duke in Lower Lorraine. At a much later date, Godfrey became Duke of Lower Lorraine, but he had lost the upper duchy by that point in time.

=== Revolts against Emperor Henry III ===
Godfrey rebelled against his King and devastated land in Lower Lorraine, as well as the City of Verdun; which, though his by inheritance, Henry had not given him. He was soon defeated by an Imperial army, deposed and imprisoned together with his son (Gibichenstein, 1045). When his son died in prison (1046), the war recommenced. Baldwin V of Flanders joined Godfrey, while Henry gave Thierry, Bishop of Verdun, the eponymous county. Godfrey surprised the Bishop (who escaped) and sacked Verdun, burning the cathedral. On 11 November 1048 at Thuin, Godfrey fell on Adalbert, his replacement in Upper Lorraine, and defeated him, killing him in battle. Henry immediately nominated the young Gerard of Chatenoy to replace Adalbert at the Diet of Worms. In his subsequent campaigns to take the Moselle region, Godfrey met with stiff resistance from Gerard and was forced to renounce his claims and reconcile with the Bishop. He even assisted in rebuilding the cathedral he had destroyed.

In 1053, his first wife Doda having died, Godfrey remarried Beatrice of Bar, the widow of Boniface III of Tuscany and mother of Matilda, Boniface's heir. Henry arrested Beatrice and her young son Frederick and imprisoned her in Germany, separate from either husband or son, who died within days. The emperor claimed the marriage had been contracted without his consent and was invalid. Young Frederick died a short while later. Nevertheless, Godfrey took over the government of the Tuscany in right of Beatrice and Matilda.

Baldwin V then rebelled, carrying the war to Trier and Nijmegen. Henry responded by devastating Flanders and ravaging Lille and Tournai (1054). In this war, Godfrey captured Frederick of Luxembourg, Duke of Lower Lorraine, who had received that duchy, including Antwerp, from Henry III.

In 1055, Godfrey besieged Antwerp, but Frederick was delivered by the Lorrainers, no longer loyal to Godfrey. Henry died in 1056 and his successor, Henry IV, was only six years old. In that year, Baldwin made peace and did homage to the new King. In 1056 and 1059, by the treaties of Andernach, Baldwin received the March of Ename in the Landgraviate of Brabant, probably in exchange for giving up the March of Valenciennes, which was confiscated by Emperor Henry III in 1045.

=== Duke of Spoleto ===
In 1057, Godfrey was exiled to Tuscany, where he joined Beatrice and co-governed with her. He was enfeoffed with the Duchy of Spoleto (1057) by Pope Stephen IX, his brother. In January 1058, Leo de Benedicto Christiano threw open the city gates to him and Beatrice after the election of Pope Nicholas II. Possessing the Tiber and assaulting the Lateran, Godfrey succeeded in expelling the antipope Benedict X on 24 January. During the papal reign of his brother and his brother's reforming successors, he played an important role in the politics of central and northern Italy, including Sardinia, where he interfered on behalf of Barisone I of Logudoro against the Republic of Pisa, indicating his authority over both.

=== Duke of Lower Lorraine ===
In 1065, he was recalled to become Duke of Lower Lorraine after the death of Frederick. He was also given Antwerp again. He installed his court at Bouillon and died on Christmas Eve 1069.

== Family ==
Godfrey and Doda (Note: possibly a daughter of her namesake Dada and Manasses II of Rethel) had:

- Godfrey, succeeded him in Lower Lorraine
- Ida of Lorraine, married to Eustace II, Count of Boulogne, she was the mother of Godfrey of Bouillon and Baldwin I, King of Jerusalem;
- Wiltrude, married Adalbert of Calw

== Sources ==
- Runciman, Steven (1951). A History of the Crusades. Vol. 1. Cambridge University Press.
- Tanner, Heather (2004). Families, Friends and Allies: Boulogne and Politics in Northern France and England, c.879-1160. Brill.
- A. Creber, 'Mirrors for Margraves: Peter Damian's Different Models for Male and Female Rulers,’ Historical Reflections/Réflexions Historiques, 42:1 (2016), 8-20.

Godfrey the Bearded Ardennes-Verdun dynasty Born: c. 997 Died: 1069
Preceded by Gothelo I	Duke of Upper Lorraine; 1044–1047	Succeeded by Adalbert
Preceded by Frederick	Duke of Lower Lorraine; 1065–1069	Succeeded by Godfrey the Hunchback
Preceded by Frederick	Margrave of Tuscany; 1055–1069 (with Matilda of Tuscany)	Succeeded by Godfrey the Hunchback
Vacant Part of Papal States Title last held by Hugh III	Duke of Spoleto; 1057–1069	Succeeded by Godfrey the Hunchback
Preceded by Frederick	Margrave of Antwerp; 1065–1069	Succeeded by Baldwin VI
