= Gothelo II of Lower Lorraine =

Son of Gothelo I (1008–1046)

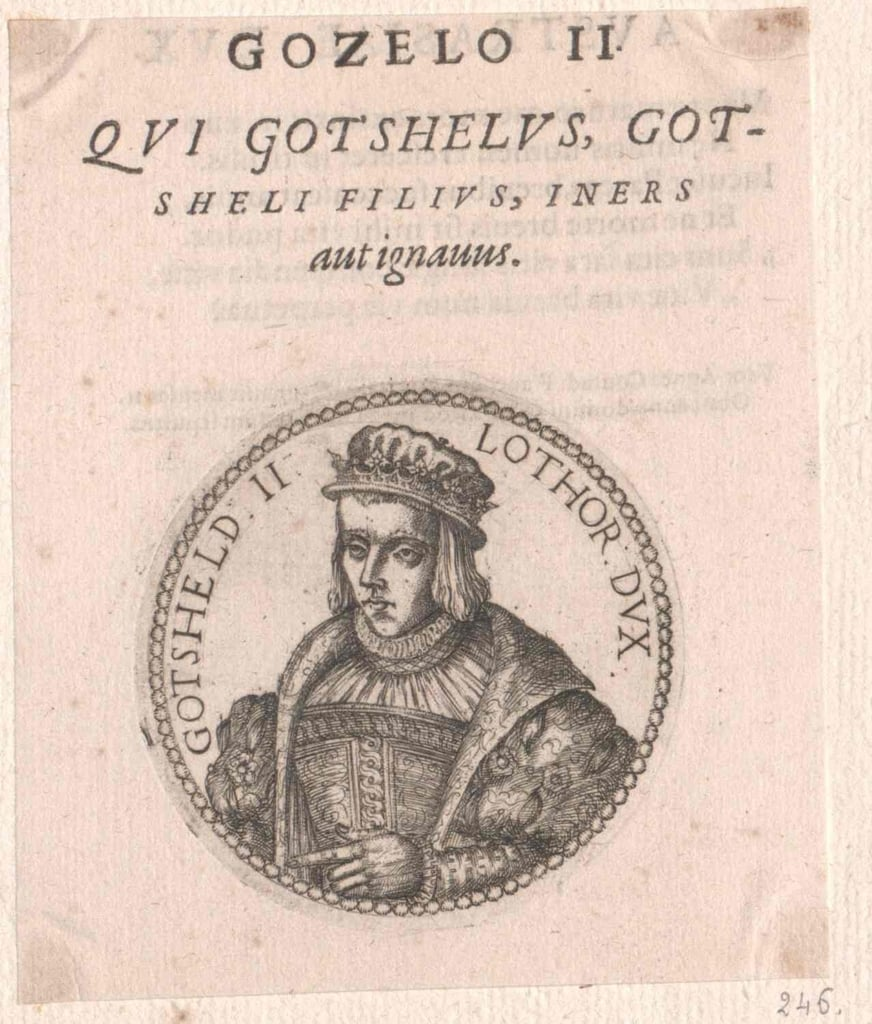
- Born: 1008
- Died: 1046 (aged 37–38)
- Noble family: House of Ardennes-Verdun
- Father: Gothelo I, Duke of Lorraine

Gothelo II (also Gozelo) (1008–1046), variously called the Coward, the Sluggard, the Indolent, or the Lazy (Latin ignavus), has been often said to be Duke of Lower Lorraine after the death of his father Gothelo I, Duke of both Lower and Upper Lorraine (1044) until his own death in 1046.

When Gothelo I died in 1044, Godfrey III, his eldest son, who had been co-ruling in Lower Lorraine for several years, was not given Lower Lorraine by the Emperor Henry III. Henry first threatened to give Lower Lorraine to the second son Gothelo (not known for his courage or competency and who was perhaps mentally deficient). Godfrey rebelled and was imprisoned. Henry appointed Frederick of Luxembourg to succeed in Lower Lorraine.

The date of Gothelo II's death has been disputed. The homonymy between father and son and the imprecision of the documents (including the fact that not all mention him) have made his role in the duchy of Lower Lorraine debatable.
