= Eustace II of Boulogne =

Count of Boulogne from 1049 to 1087

Eustace II
- Count of Boulogne
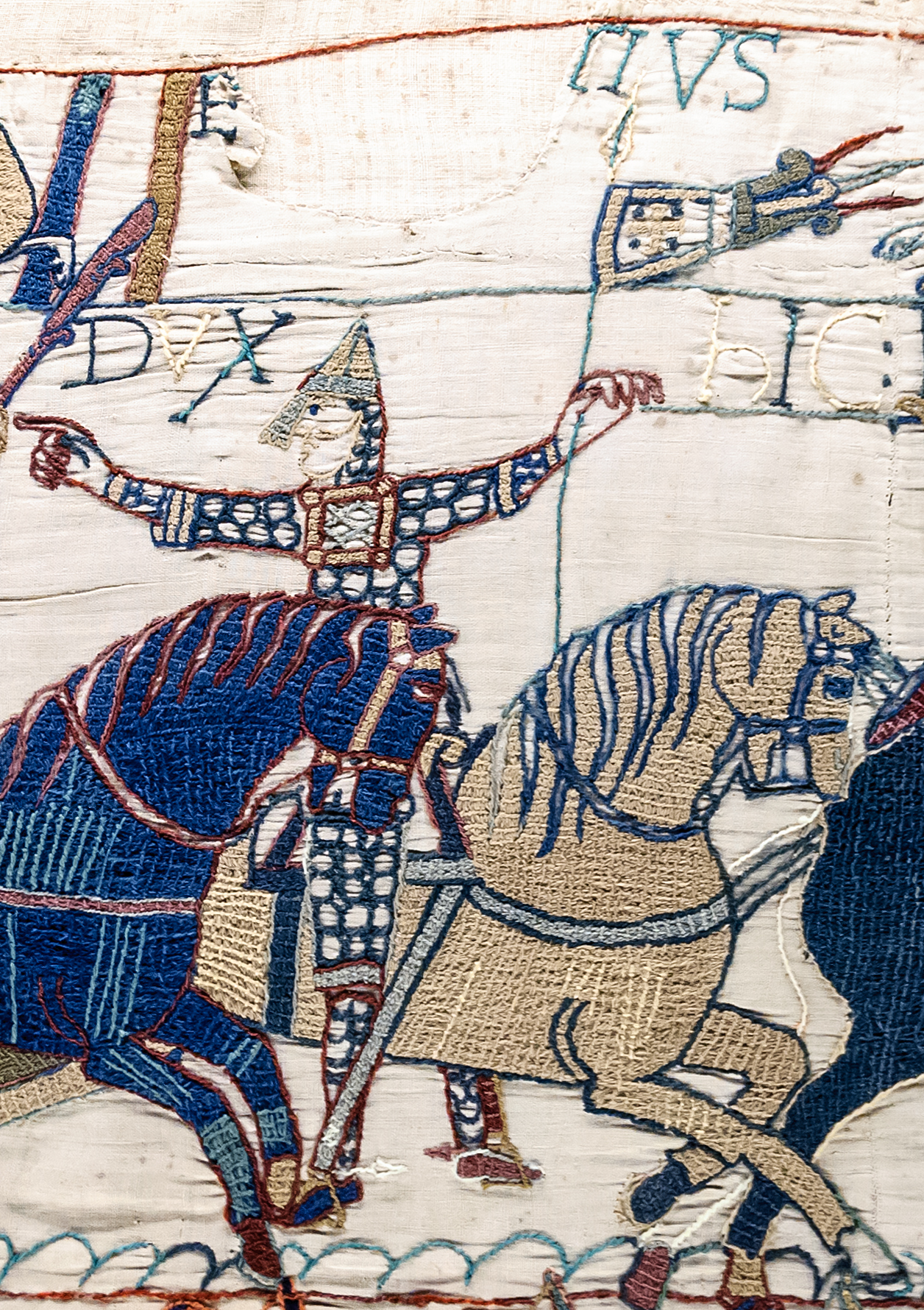
- Detail from the Bayeux Tapestry, a possible depiction of Eustace II. Inscribed in margin above: E...TIUS, which may be the Latinised form of his name.
- Born: c. 1015
- Died: c. 1087 (aged 72)
- Noble family: House of Boulogne
- Spouses: Goda of England; Ida of Lorraine
- Issue: Eustace III of Boulogne; Godfrey of Bouillon; Baldwin I of Jerusalem; Ida
- Father: Eustace I of Boulogne
- Mother: Matilda of Louvain

Eustace II (c. 1015 – c. 1087), also known as Eustace aux Gernons ("Eustace with long moustaches"), was Count of Boulogne from 1049 to 1087. He fought on the Norman side at the Battle of Hastings, and afterwards received large grants of land in England. He is one of the few proven companions of William the Conqueror. It has been suggested that Eustace was the patron of the Bayeux Tapestry. His second son Godfrey of Bouillon was a preeminent leader of the First Crusade, and the first ruler of the Kingdom of Jerusalem.

== Origins ==
Eustace was the son of Eustace I of Boulogne and Matilda of Louvain.

== Career ==
Eustace's first wife was Goda, the sister of King Edward the Confessor of England. In 1047, Godfrey III, Duke of Lower Lorraine rebelled against the Holy Roman Emperor, Henry III, and Eustace joined the rebellion. Then or earlier, he repudiated Goda and married Godfrey's daughter Ida. The next year Eustace was excommunicated by Pope Leo IX for marrying within the prohibited degree of kinship. Eustace and Ida were both descended from Louis II of France, and just within the prohibited seventh degree. However, since not all their ancestors are known, there might have existed a closer relationship. The Pope's action was possibly at the behest of Henry III. The rebellion failed, and in 1049 Eustace and Godfrey submitted to Henry III.

In 1051, Eustace visited Edward, his former brother-in-law. On his way back to the coast Eustace decided to stay overnight in Dover, and as he and his men approached the town they put on mail coats. The historian Tom Licence comments: "Eustace was either anticipating trouble or intending to start a fight." In the ensuing brawl twenty townsmen were killed and a similar number of Eustace's men. He went straight to the king to complain, and Edward immediately ordered Godwin, who had jurisdiction over the town, to ravage it. Godwin was furious at Edward accepting Eustace's version of events without hearing the other side, and instead of obeying the order he started to raise an army. In the confrontation that followed he and his sons were forced to flee the country.

The following years saw still further advances by Eustace's rivals and enemies. Count Baldwin of Flanders consolidated his hold over territories he had annexed to the east. In 1060 he became regent for or guardian of his nephew King Philip I of France. In contrast Eustace's stepson Walter of Mantes failed in his attempt to claim the County of Maine. He was captured by the Normans and died soon afterwards in mysterious circumstances.

=== Battle of Hastings ===
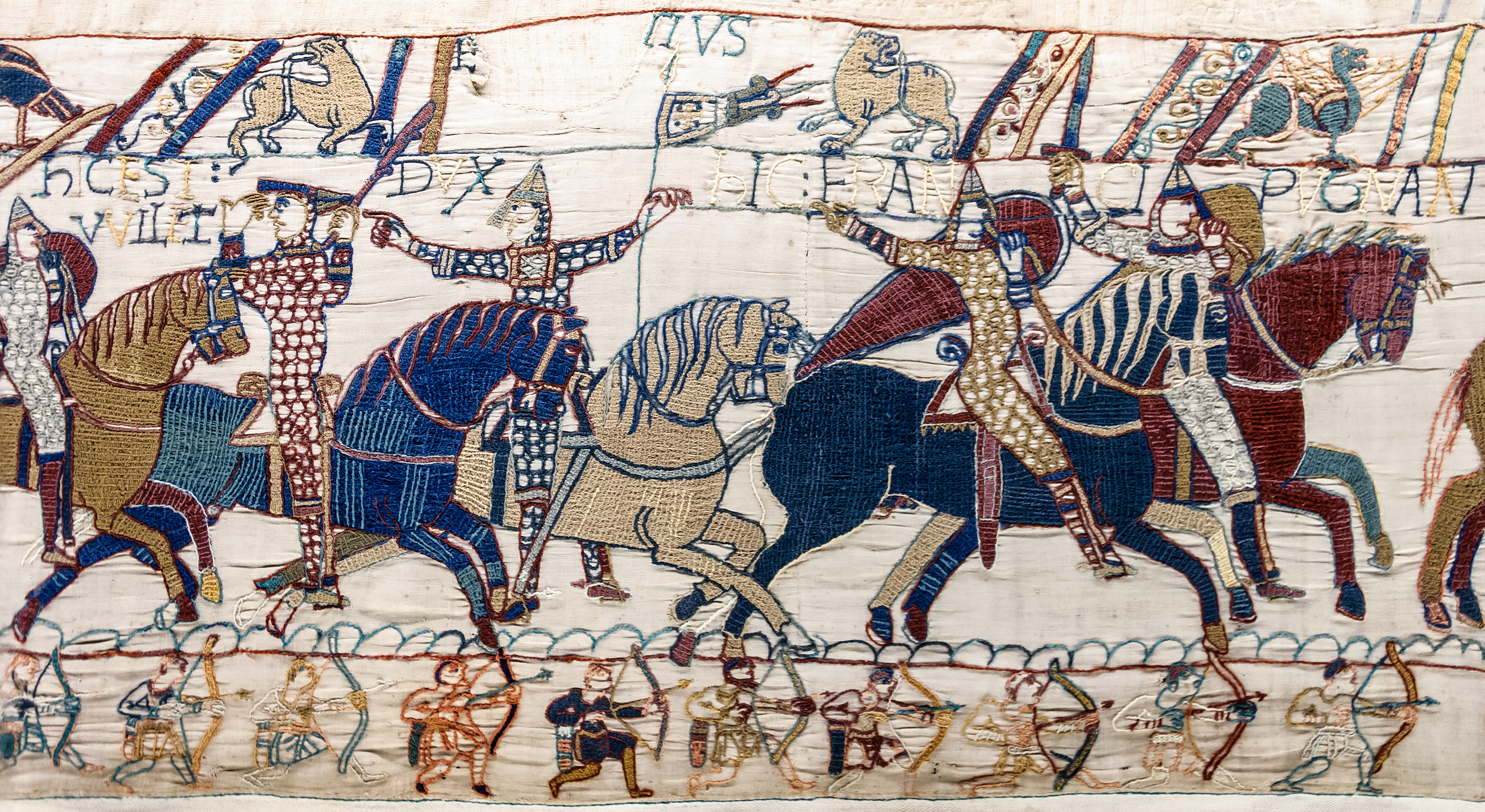
Supposed depiction of Eustace at the Battle of Hastings. Detail from the Bayeux Tapestry. Inscription above Duke William at left: HIC EST WILLELMUS DUX ("Here is Duke William") and above the figure to the right of him E...TIUS (apparently a Latinised form of "Eustace")

These events evidently caused a shift in Eustace's political allegiances, for he then became an important participant in the Norman Conquest of England in 1066. He fought at Hastings, although sources vary regarding the details of his conduct during the battle. The contemporary chronicler William of Poitiers wrote concerning him:

With a harsh voice he [Duke William] called to Eustace of Boulogne, who with 50 knights was turning in flight and was about to give the signal for retreat. This man came up to the Duke and said in his ear that he ought to retire since he would court death if he went forward. But at the very moment when he uttered the words Eustace was struck between the shoulders with such force that blood gushed out from his mouth and nose and half dead he only made his escape with the aid of his followers.

The depiction in the Bayeux Tapestry shows a knight carrying a banner who rides up to Duke William and points excitedly with his finger towards the rear of the Norman advance. William turns his head and lifts up his visor to show his knights following him that he is still alive and determined to fight on. This conforms therefore with Eustace having somewhat lost his nerve and having urged the Duke to retreat while the Battle was at its height with the outcome still uncertain. Other sources suggest that Eustace was present with William at the Malfosse incident in the immediate aftermath of the battle, where a Saxon feigning death leapt up and attacked him, and was presumably cut down before he could reach William.

Eustace received large land grants afterwards, which suggests he contributed in other ways as well, perhaps by providing ships.

== Rebellion ==
In the following year, probably because he was dissatisfied with his share of the spoil, he assisted the Kentishmen in an attempt to seize Dover Castle. The conspiracy failed, and Eustace was sentenced to forfeit his English fiefs. Subsequently, he was reconciled to the Conqueror, who restored a portion of the confiscated lands.

== Death ==
Eustace died circa 1087, and was succeeded by his son, Eustace III.

== Marriage and progeny ==
Eustace married twice:

- Firstly to Goda, daughter of the English king Æthelred the Unready, and sister of Edward the Confessor. Goda died circa 1047.
- Secondly in about 1049, soon after Goda's death, he married Ida of Lorraine, daughter of Godfrey III, Duke of Lower Lorraine. Eustace and Ida had three sons:
  - Eustace III, Count of Boulogne
  - Godfrey of Bouillon, Defender of the Holy Sepulchre of Jerusalem
  - Baldwin I of Jerusalem, King of Jerusalem

By his second wife, Eustace may also have had a daughter, Ida, wife of Conon, Count of Montaigu.

Eustace also had a son, Geoffrey fitz Eustace, who married Beatrice de Mandeville, daughter of Geoffrey de Mandeville. Geoffrey and Beatrice were parents of William de Boulogne and grandparents of William's son Faramus de Boulogne.

== Cinematic depictions ==
Eustace has been portrayed on screen by Leslie Bradley in the film Lady Godiva of Coventry (1955) and by Joby Blanshard in the two-part BBC TV play Conquest (1966), part of the series Theatre 625.

== See also ==
- Algernon

== Sources ==
- Bridgeford, Andrew (1999). "Was Count Eustace II of Boulogne the patron of the Bayeux Tapestry?". Journal of Medieval History. 25 (3): 155–185. doi:10.1016/S0304-4181(98)00029-3.; Bridgeford, Andrew (2005). 1066: The Hidden History in the Bayeux Tapestry. Walker & Company. ISBN 1-84115-040-1.; Bridgeford, Andrew (2004). "Whose Tapestry is it Anyway?". History Today. 54.
- Licence, Tom (2020). Edward the Confessor: Last of the Royal Blood. New Haven, Connecticut: Yale University Press. ISBN 978-0-300-21154-2.
- Murray, Alan V. (2000). The Crusader Kingdom of Jerusalem: A Dynastic History 1099-1125. Prosopographica et Genealogica.
- Tanner, Heather (1992). "The Expansion of the Power and Influence of the Counts of Boulogne under Eustace II". Anglo-Norman Studies. 14: 251–277.
- Tanner, Heather (2004). Families, Friends and Allies: Boulogne and Politics in Northern France and England, c.879-1160. Brill.
- Ordericus Vitalis (1854). The Ecclesiastical History of England and Normandy, Vol II. Thomas Forester (trans). London: H. G. Bohn. pp. 12, footnote.
- Holböck, Ferdinand (c. 2002). Married Saints and Blesseds. Ignatius Press. p. 147. ISBN 0-89870-843-5.
- Duby, Georges; Jane Dunnett, translator (c. 1996). Love and Marriage in the Middle Ages. University of Chicago Press: Ignatius Press. p. 40. ISBN 0-226-16774-7.
- Williams, Ann (1997). The English and the Norman Conquest. Boydell Press.

Eustace II of Boulogne House of Boulogne Born: c. 1015-1020 Died: c. 1087
Preceded by Eustace I	Count of Boulogne; 1049–1087	Succeeded by Eustace III
