= Godfrey the Hunchback =

Duke of Lower Lorraine (died 1076)

Godfrey IV, Duke of Lower Lorraine
- Died: 26 or 27 February 1076
- Noble family: House of Ardennes-Verdun
- Spouse: Matilda of Tuscany
- Father: Godfrey III, Duke of Lower Lorraine
- Mother: Doda

Godfrey IV (died 26 or 27 February 1076), known as the Hunchback, was Duke of Lower Lorraine from 1069 until his death in 1076, succeeding his father Godfrey the Bearded.

In the year of his accession, he married Margravine Matilda of Tuscany, daughter of his stepmother Beatrice of Bar, and thus became margrave of Tuscany. Godfrey and Matilda had only one child, Beatrice, who was born in 1071 and died the same year. From 1071 onwards, Godfrey lived apart from his wife. The two spouses were on opposite sides in the Investiture Controversy: Matilda was a partisan of Pope Gregory VII and Godfrey of Emperor Henry IV.

He warred on Henry's behalf against Magnus, Duke of Saxony, in 1075 and on that of the bishop of Utrecht in 1076 against Counts Dirk V of Holland and Robert I of Flanders. He was assassinated by spear in Vlaardingen while "answering the call of nature". Despite Matilda's opposition he nominated his nephew Godfrey of Bouillon to succeed him, but the emperor instead appointed his own son, Conrad. Godfrey of Bouillon succeeded eventually in 1087 and gained fame on the First Crusade.

== See also ==
- List of people who died on the toilet
- Toilet-related injuries and deaths

== Sources ==
- Hay, David (2008). The Military Leadership of Matilda of Canossa, 1046-1115. Manchester University Press.
- Mickel, Emanuel J., ed. (1999). The Old French Crusade Cycle:Les Enfances Godefroi and Le Retour de Cornumarant Les Enfances Godefroi and Le Retour de Cornumarant. Vol. III. The University of Alabama Press.

Preceded by Godfrey the Bearded	Duke of Lower Lotharingia; 1069–1076	Succeeded by Conrad
Preceded by Godfrey the Bearded	Margrave of Tuscany; 1069–1076	Succeeded by Matilda
Preceded by Baldwin the Good	Margrave of Antwerp; 1070–1076	Succeeded by Godfrey of Bouillon
