= Gothelo I of Lorraine =

Duke of Lower Lorraine from 1023 to 1044

Gothelo I
- Duke of Lorraine
- Born: c. 967
- Died: 19 April 1044
- Noble family: House of Ardennes–Verdun
- Issue: Godfrey the Bearded; Gothelo II; Pope Stephen IX; Regilinda; Oda; Matilda
- Father: Godfrey I, Count of Verdun
- Mother: Matilda of Saxony

Gothelo (or Gozelo) (c. 967 – 19 April 1044), called the Great, was the duke of Lower Lorraine from 1023 and of Upper Lorraine from 1033. He was also the margrave of Antwerp from 1005 (or 1008) and count of Verdun. Gothelo was the youngest son of Godfrey I, Count of Verdun, and Matilda, daughter of Herman, Duke of Saxony. On his father's death, he received the march of Antwerp and became a vassal of his brother, Godfrey II, who became duke of Lower Lorraine in 1012. Gothelo succeeded his brother in 1023 with the support of the Emperor Henry II, but was opposed until Conrad II forced the rebels to submit in 1025. When the House of Bar, which ruled in Upper Lorraine, became extinct in 1033, with the death of his cousin Frederick II, Conrad made Gothelo duke of both duchies, so that he could assist in the defence of the territory against Odo II, count of Blois, Meaux, Chartres and Troyes (the later Champagne). It was during this time 1033-1034, that Gothelo clashed with Baldwin IV, Count of Flanders, concerning the march of Ename.

In the Battle of Bar on 15 November 1037, Gothelo dealt a decisive blow to Odo, who was trying to create an independent state between France and Germany. Odo died in the battle.

Gothelo died on 19 April 1044 and was buried in the Abbey Church of Bilzen. His son Godfrey succeeded in Upper Lorraine, but the Emperor Henry III refused to give him the duchy of Lower Lorraine as well. When Godfrey showed disagreement with the imperial decision, Henry III threatened to pass the duchy to Godfrey's incompetent brother Gothelo. This caused a long rebellion in Lotharingia between the allies of Godfrey (the counts of Flanders and Leuven) and imperial forces (1044–1056).

== Family ==
The name of Gothelo's wife is not known, the name Barbe de Lebarten (and in fact her entire ancestry), being a spurious concoction of later genealogists. He had the following children:

- Godfrey the Bearded, duke of Lower Lorraine
- Gothelo, duke of Lower Lorraine
- Frederick, later Pope Stephen IX
- Regilinda, married Albert II, Count of Namur
- Oda, married Lambert II, Count of Leuven
- Matilda, married Henry I, Count Palatine of Lotharingia

== Sources ==
- Morby, John (1989). Dynasties of the World. Oxford University Press.
- Tanner, Heather (2004). Families, Friends and Allies: Boulogne and Politics in Northern France and England, c.879-1160. Brill.

Gothelo I of Lorraine House of Ardennes–Verdun Born: c. 967 Died: 19 April 1044
| Preceded by Godfrey the Childless | Duke of Lower Lorraine; 1023–1044 | Succeeded by Frederick |
| Preceded by Frederick II | Duke of Upper Lorraine; 1033–1044 | Succeeded by Godfrey the Bearded |
| Preceded by Godfrey the Prisoner | Margrave of Antwerp; 1005–1044 | Succeeded by Gothelo the Lazy |
