= List of kings and dukes of Lorraine =

The kings and dukes of Lorraine have held different posts under different governments over different regions, since its creation as the kingdom of Lotharingia by the Treaty of Prüm, in 855. The first rulers of the newly established region were kings of the Franks. The Latin construction "Lotharingia" evolved over time into "Lorraine" in French, "Lotharingen" in Dutch and "Lothringen" in German. After the Carolingian kingdom was absorbed into its neighbouring realms in the late ninth century, dukes were appointed over the territory. In the mid-tenth century, the duchy was divided into Lower Lorraine and Upper Lorraine, the first evolving into the historical Low Countries, the second became known as the Duchy of Lorraine and existed well into the modern era.

== Kings of Lotharingia ==
- Lothair II (855–869)

Charles the Bald claimed Lotharingia on Lothair's death and was crowned king in Metz, but his brother Louis the German opposed his claim and in 870 the Treaty of Mersen divided Lotharingia between the two brothers and subsequently their sons. In 880, the Treaty of Ribemont gave the whole of Lotharingia to Louis the Younger, son of Louis the German.

Between 869-895 the title King or Duke of Lotharingia did not exist. The territory was ruled by the king of West Francia (869-870), kings of West Francia and East Francia (870-876), kings of West Francia and Saxony (876-880), king of Saxony (880-882), and finally King of East Francia (882-895).

Between 869 and 895 the region was ruled as follows:

- Charles the Bald (869–870), king of West Francia and Italy, and Carolingian emperor
- Louis the German, king of East Francia and Charles the Bald, king of West Francia (870- 876)
- Louis the Younger, king of Saxony and Charles the Bald (876-877), king of West Francia
- Louis the Younger, king of Saxony and Louis III of France (877-880), king of West Francia
- Louis the Younger (880–882), king of Saxony and Bavaria
- Charles the Fat (882–887), king of East Francia, Italy, and West Francia and Carolingian emperor
- Arnulf of Carinthia (887–895), king of East Francia and Italy, and Carolingian emperor

In 895 the title of king of Lotharingia was reestablished under:

- Zwentibold (895–900), King of Lorraine

After Zwentibold was defeated and killed in battle by Count Reginar, the rule reverted to a duchy under the king of East Francia and in 911 under West Francia.

- Louis the Child (900–911), king of East Francia and Gebhard, Duke of Lorraine(903-910)
- Charles the Simple (911–923), king of West Francia and Reginar, Duke of Lorraine (910-915) and subsequently his son Gilbert, Duke of Lorraine (915-939).

In 925, Lotharingia was again subsumed into East Francia under Henry the Fowler, King of Saxony and King of East Francia.

List of dukes of Lorraine from 925 to 959 under kings of East Francia is as follows:

- Gilbert (915–939)
- Henry (939–940)
- Otto (942–944)
- Conrad (944–953)
- Bruno, Archbishop of Cologne (953–965)

In 959, Lorraine was divided into two districts, Lower and Upper Lorraine, each governed by a margrave, under Bruno. Upon Bruno's death in 965, these two margraves were recognised as dukes of Lower and Upper Lorraine, respectively. The two duchies remained separate, following separate pathways, except for the period between 1033 and 1044.

== Dukes of Lower Lorraine ==
Note that the numbering of the dukes varies between sources.

Matfriding dynasty

- Godfrey I (959–964)
- Richer I (964-972)

After the death of Richer, the duchy was directly administrated by the holy emperor until the arrival of Charles I

Carolingian dynasty

- Charles I (977–991)
- Otto I (991–1012)

House of Ardennes–Verdun

- Godfrey II (1012–1023) (also known as Godfrey I)
- Gothelo I (1023–1044) (also duke of Upper Lorraine)
- Gothelo II (1044–1046)

House of (Ardenne–) Luxembourg

- Frederick I (1046–1065)

House of Ardennes–Verdun

- Godfrey III the Bearded (1065–1069) (also known as Godfrey II, previously duke of Upper Lorraine)
- Godfrey IV (1069–1076) (also known as Godfrey III)

Salian dynasty

- Conrad (1076–1087), but he's only two years old when he's given the title, Albert III of Namur will be vice-duke during this time.

House of Boulogne (Ardennes–Bouillon)

- Godfrey V "of Bouillon" (1087–1100) (also known as Godfrey IV), one of the leaders of the First Crusade and the first ruler of the Kingdom of Jerusalem

House of Limburg

- Henry I (1101–1106)

House of Leuven

- Godfrey VI (1106–1129) (also known as Godfrey I of Leuven)

House of Limburg

- Waleran (1129–1139)

House of Leuven

- Godfrey VII (1139–1142) (also known as Godfrey II of Leuven)
- Godfrey VIII (1142–1190) (also known as Godfrey III of Leuven)

Disintegrates. Title passes to the Duke of Brabant, who until 1795 kept the title "Duke of Lothier".

== Dukes of Upper Lorraine ==
=== House of Ardenne–Bar ===
- Frederick I (959–978)
- Theodoric I (978–1026/1027)
- Frederick II (1026/1027)
- Frederick III (1026/1027–1033)

=== House of Ardenne–Verdun ===
- Gothelo (r. 1033–1044) (also duke of Lower Lorraine).
- Godfrey, the Bearded (r. 1044–1046) (later duke of Lower Lorraine)

=== House of Metz (Ardenne–Metz) ===
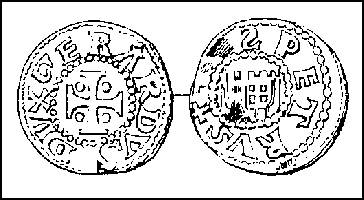
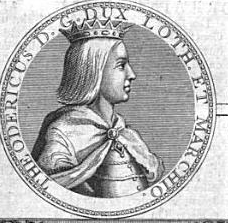
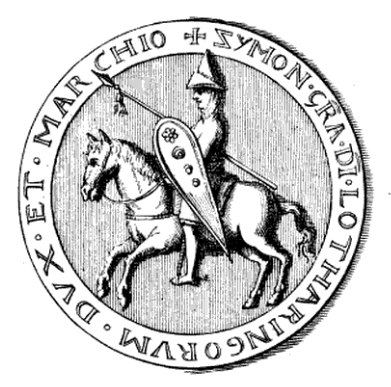
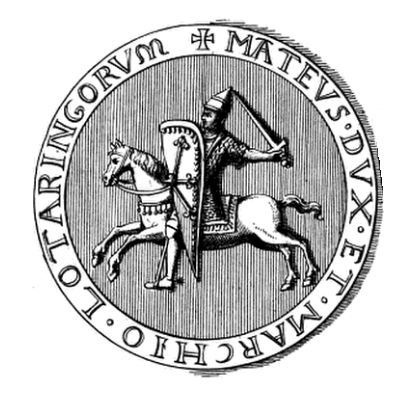
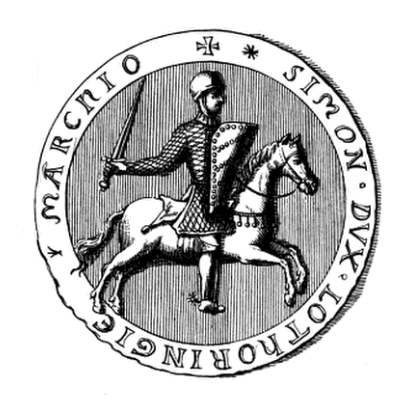
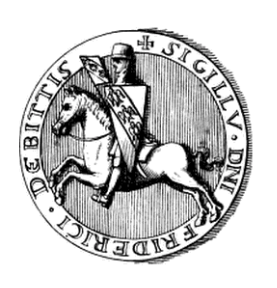
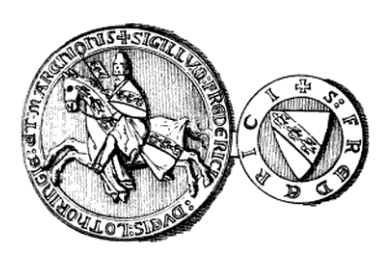
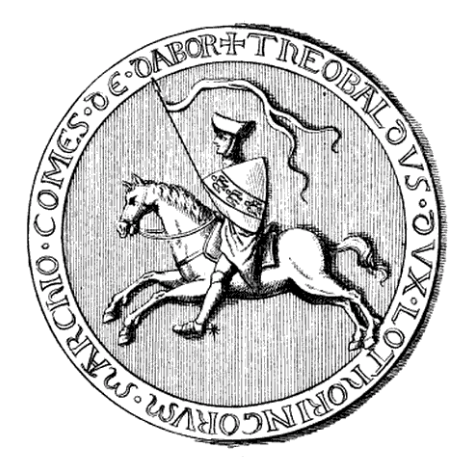
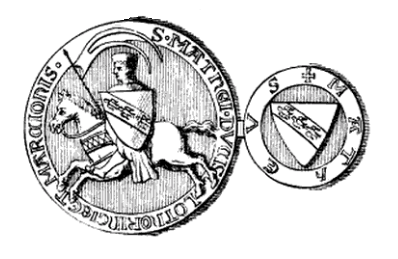
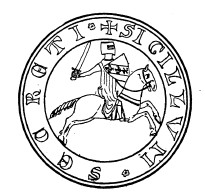
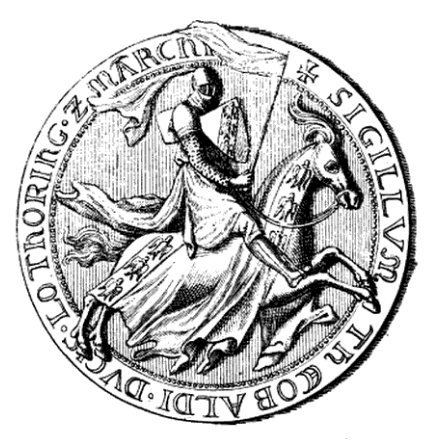
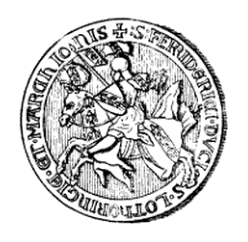
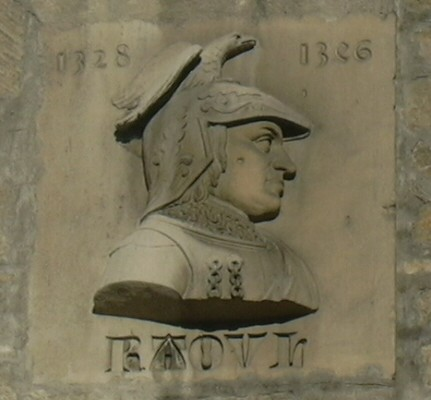
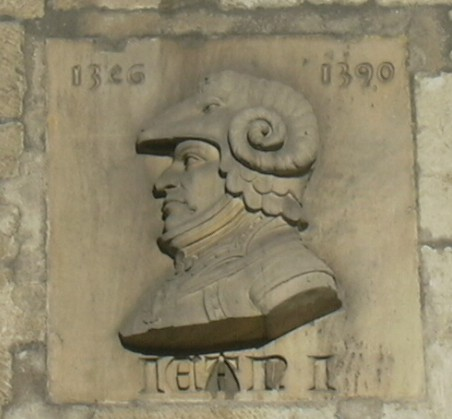
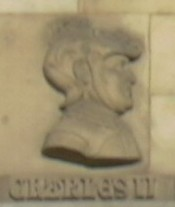
Portrait	Name	Start term	End term	Note
	Adalbert	1047	1048
	Gerhard	1048	6 March 1070
	Theodoric II	6 March 1070	23 January 1115
	Simon I	23 January 1115	13 April 1138
	Matthias I	13 April 1138	13 May 1176
	Simon II	13 May 1176	1205
	Frederick I	1205	7 April 1206
	Frederick II	7 April 1206	10 October 1213
	Theobald I	10 October 1213	17 February 1220
	Matthias II	17 February 1220	24 June 1251
	Frederick III	24 June 1251	31 December 1302
	Theobald II	31 December 1302	13 May 1312
	Frederick IV	13 May 1312	23 August 1328
	Raoul	23 August 1328	26 August 1346	killed at the Battle of Crécy
	John I	26 August 1346	27 September 1390
	Charles II	27 September 1390	25 January 1431
	Isabella	25 January 1431	28 February 1453	with her husband, René I

=== House of Anjou ===
Name	Portrait	Birth	Marriages	Death
René; 25 January 1431 – 28 February 1453		16 January 1409; Château d'Angers son of Louis II of Anjou and Yolande of Aragon	(1) Isabella; 1420 ten children (2) Jeanne de Laval; 10 September 1454 no issue	10 July 1480; Aix-en-Provence aged 71
John II; 28 February 1453 – 16 December 1470		2 August 1424; Nancy son of René and Isabella	Marie de Bourbon; 1444 five children	16 December 1470; Barcelona aged 46
Nicholas I 16 December 1470 – 24 July 1473		1448; Nancy son of John II and Marie de Bourbon	never married	24 July 1473; Nancy aged 22

=== House of Lorraine ===
Junior branch of the previous rulers of Ardennes–Metz, known as the House of Lorraine.

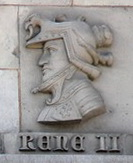
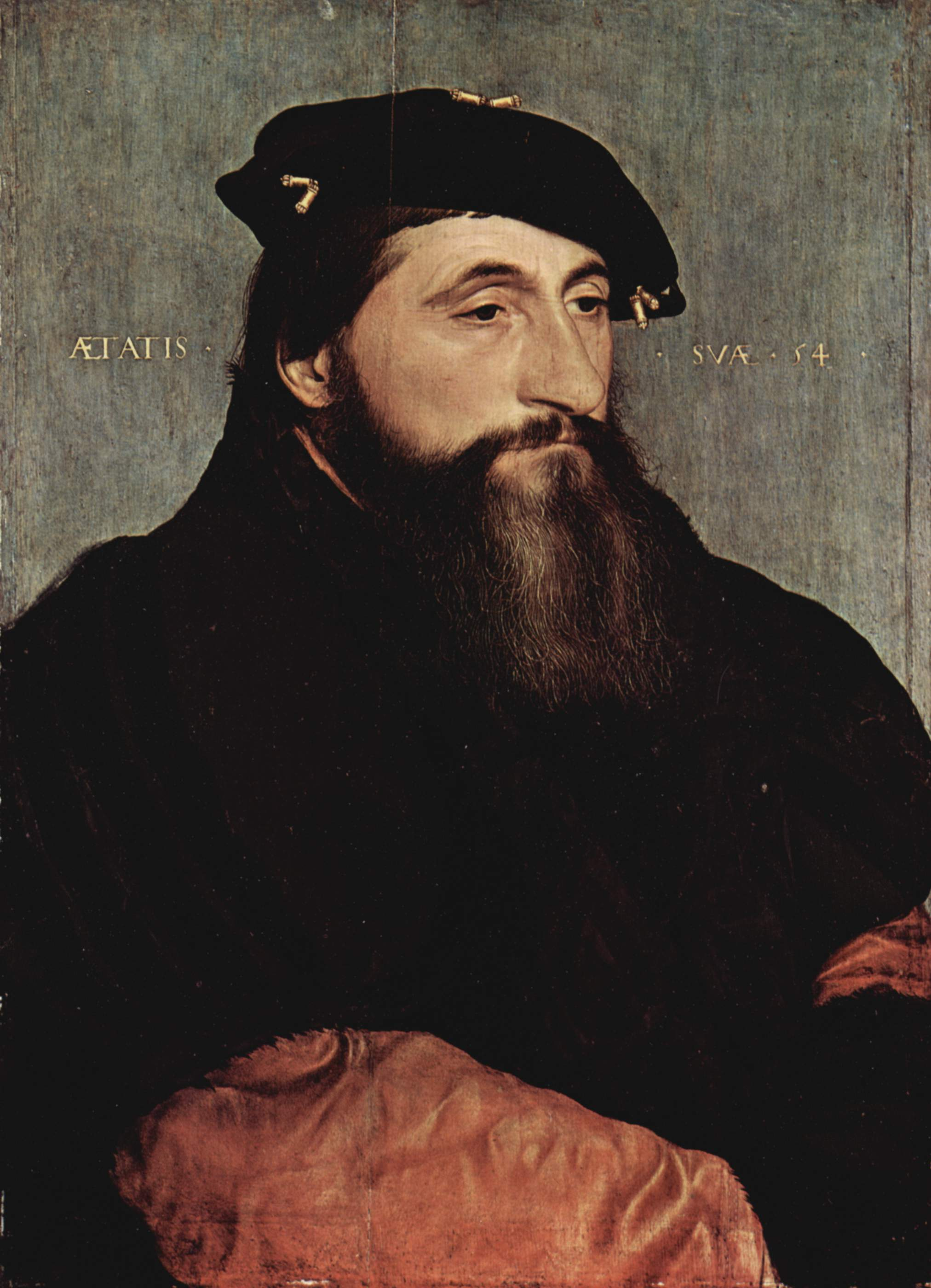
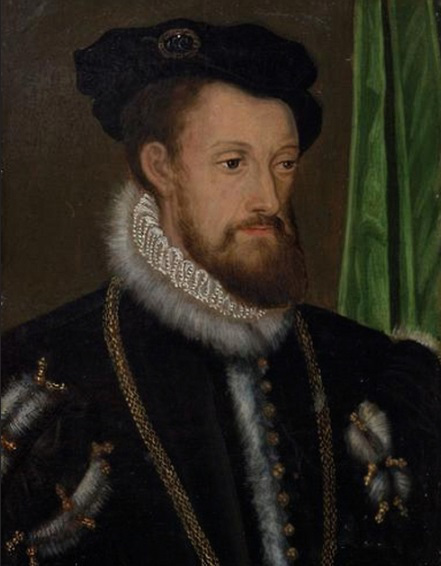
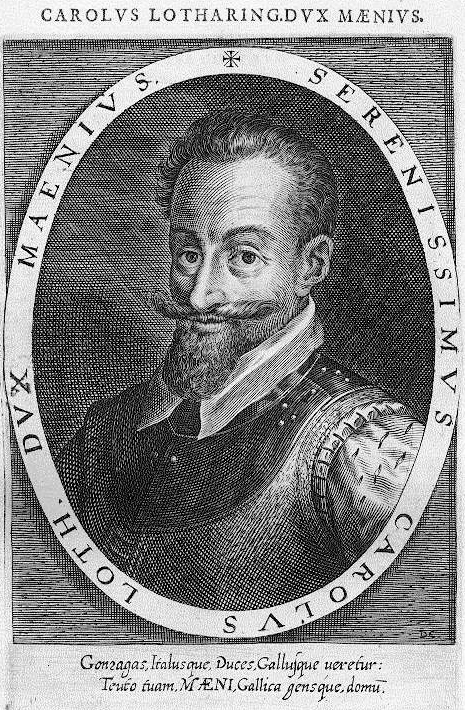
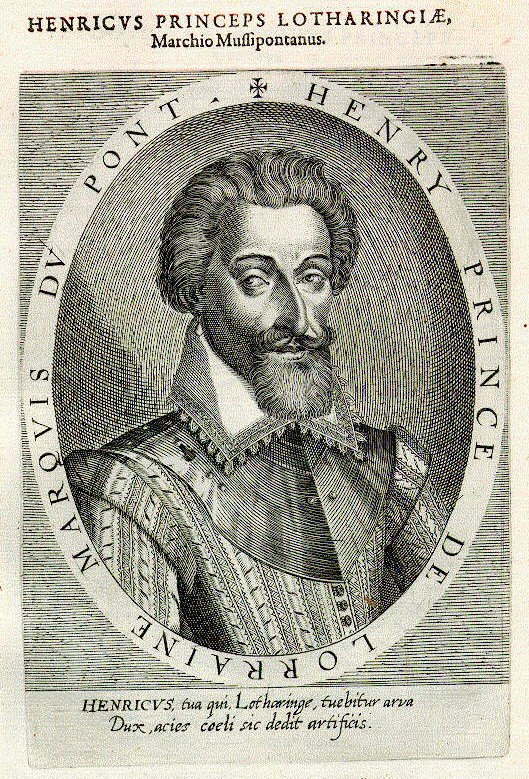
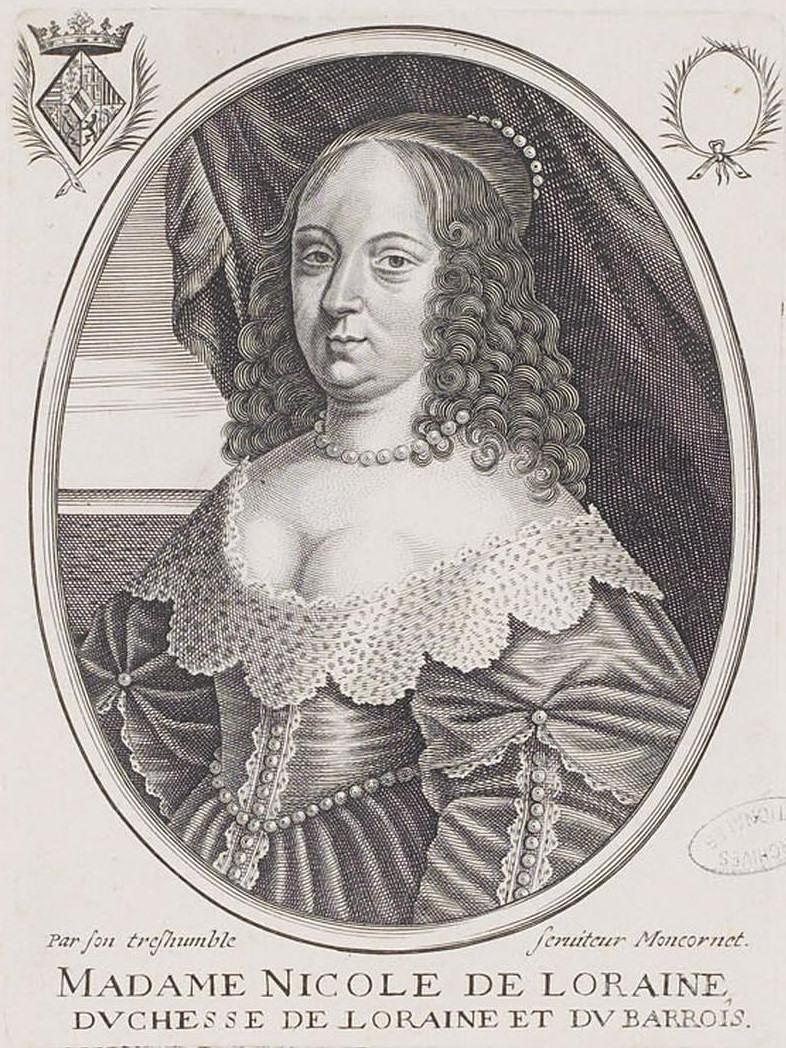
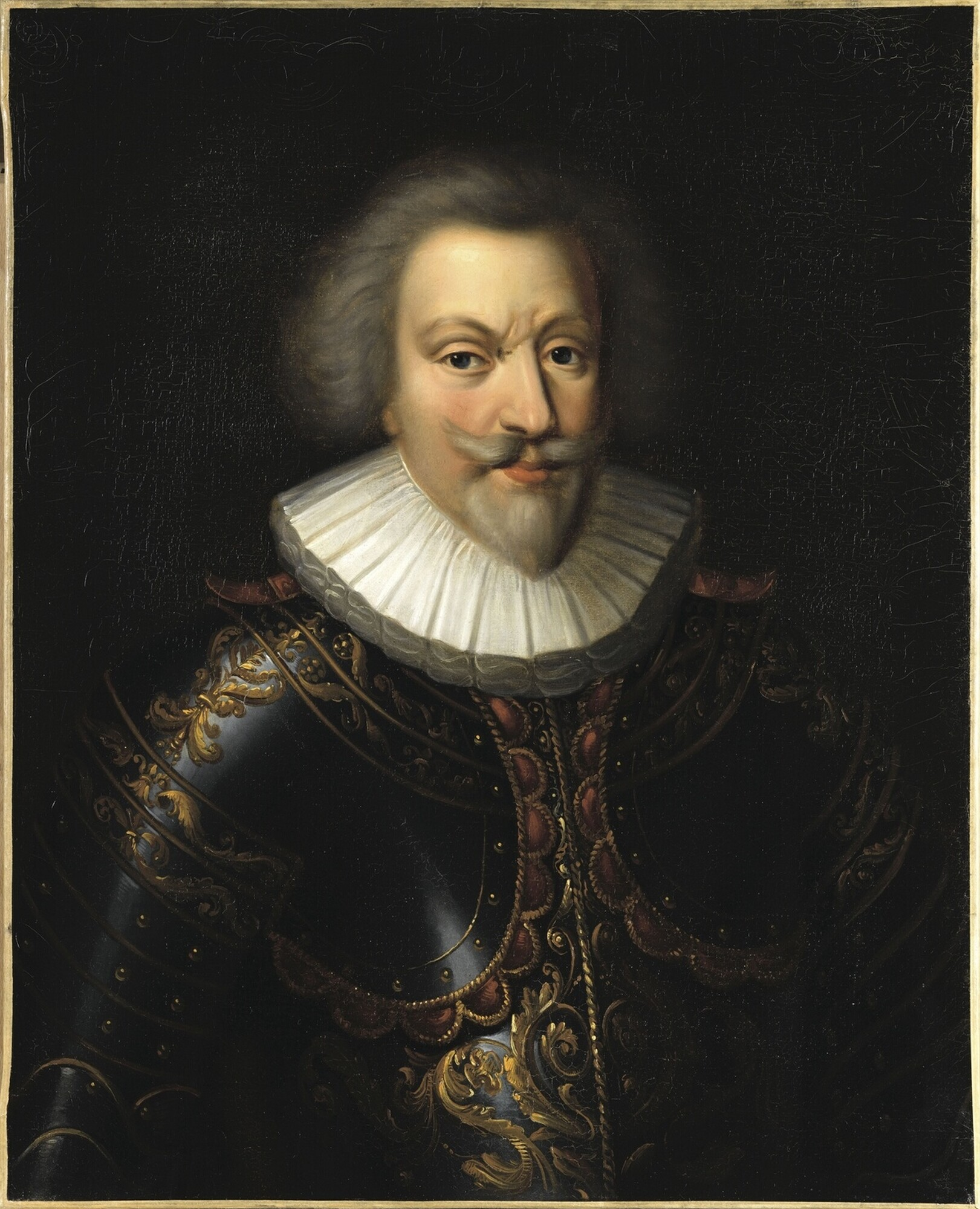
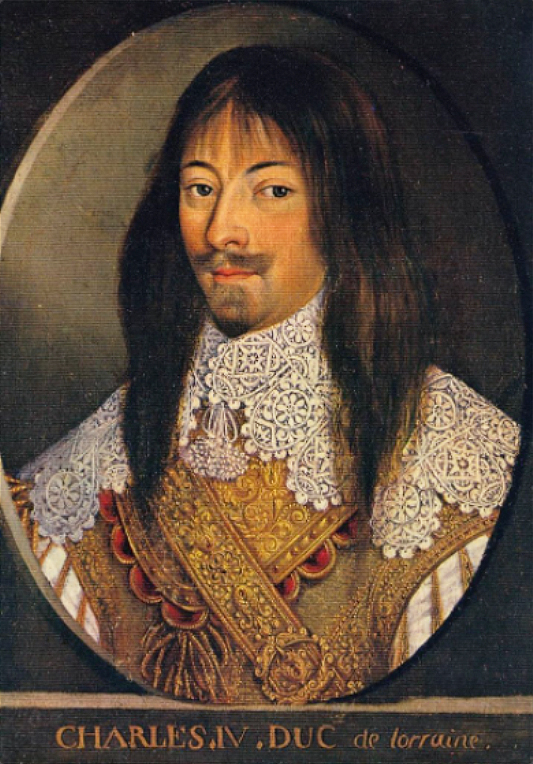
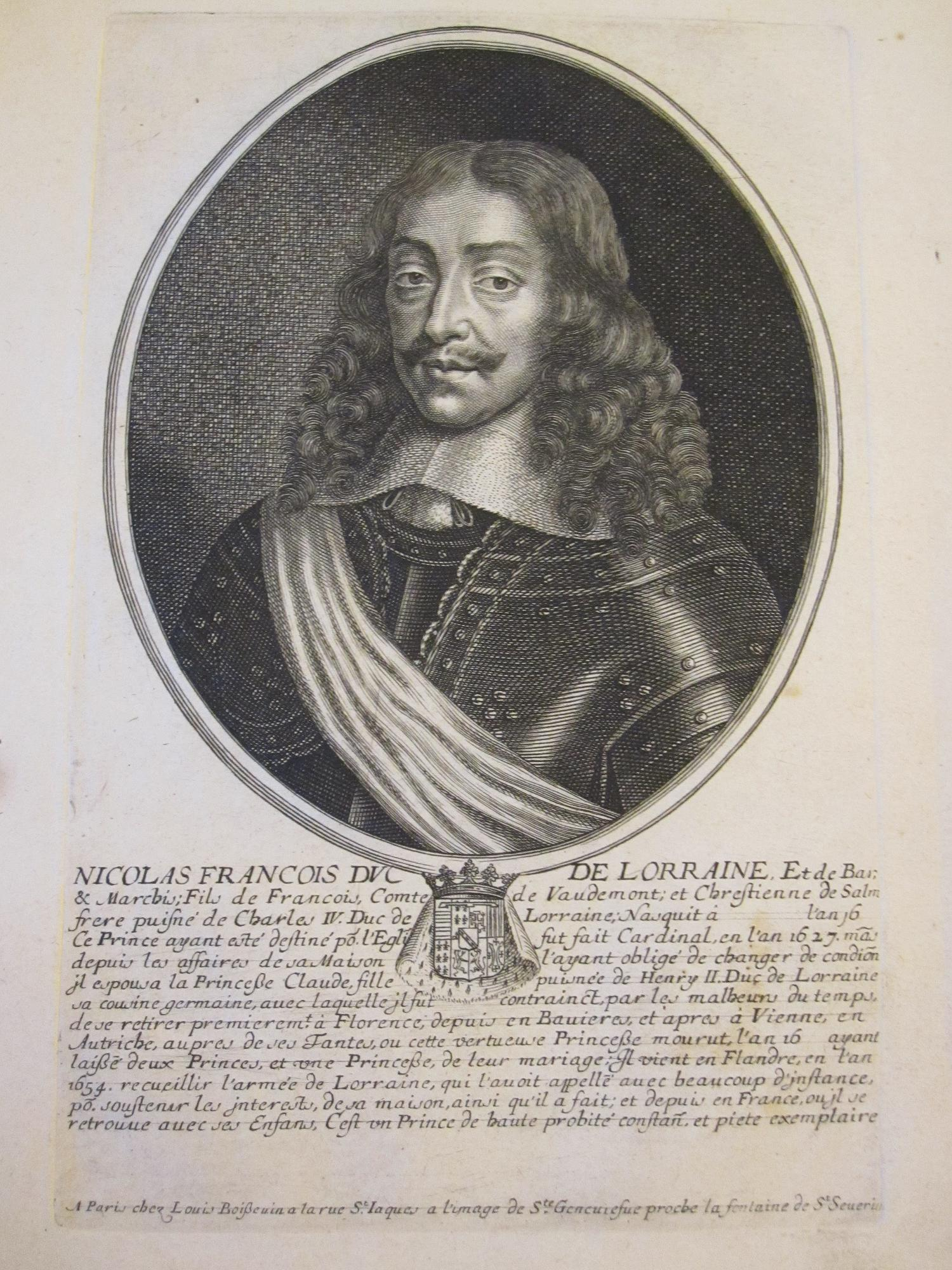
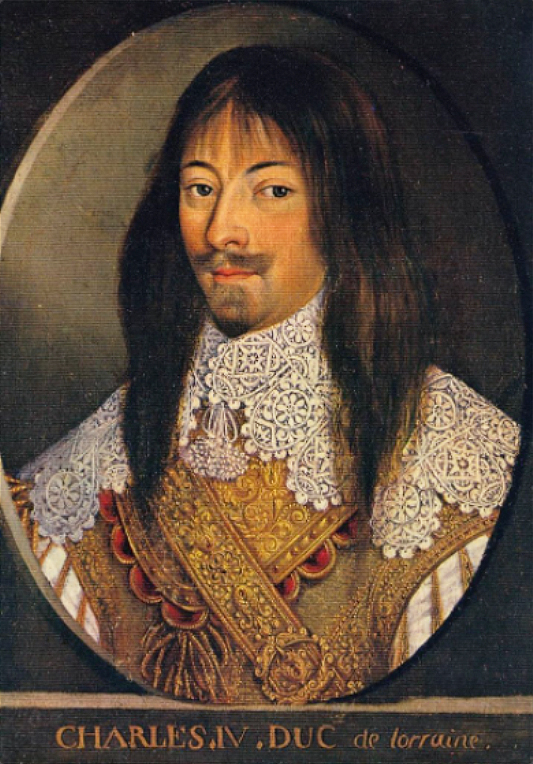
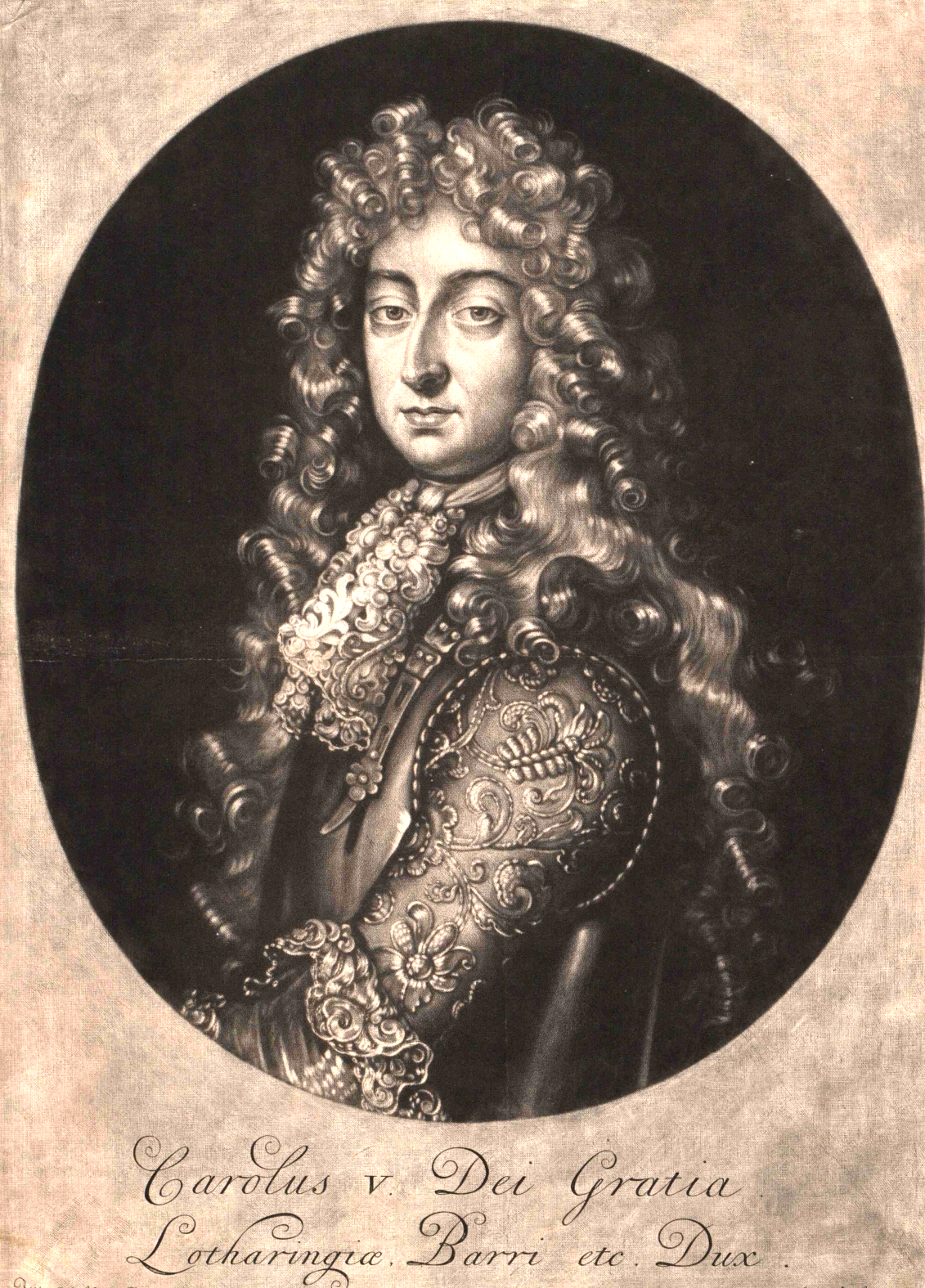
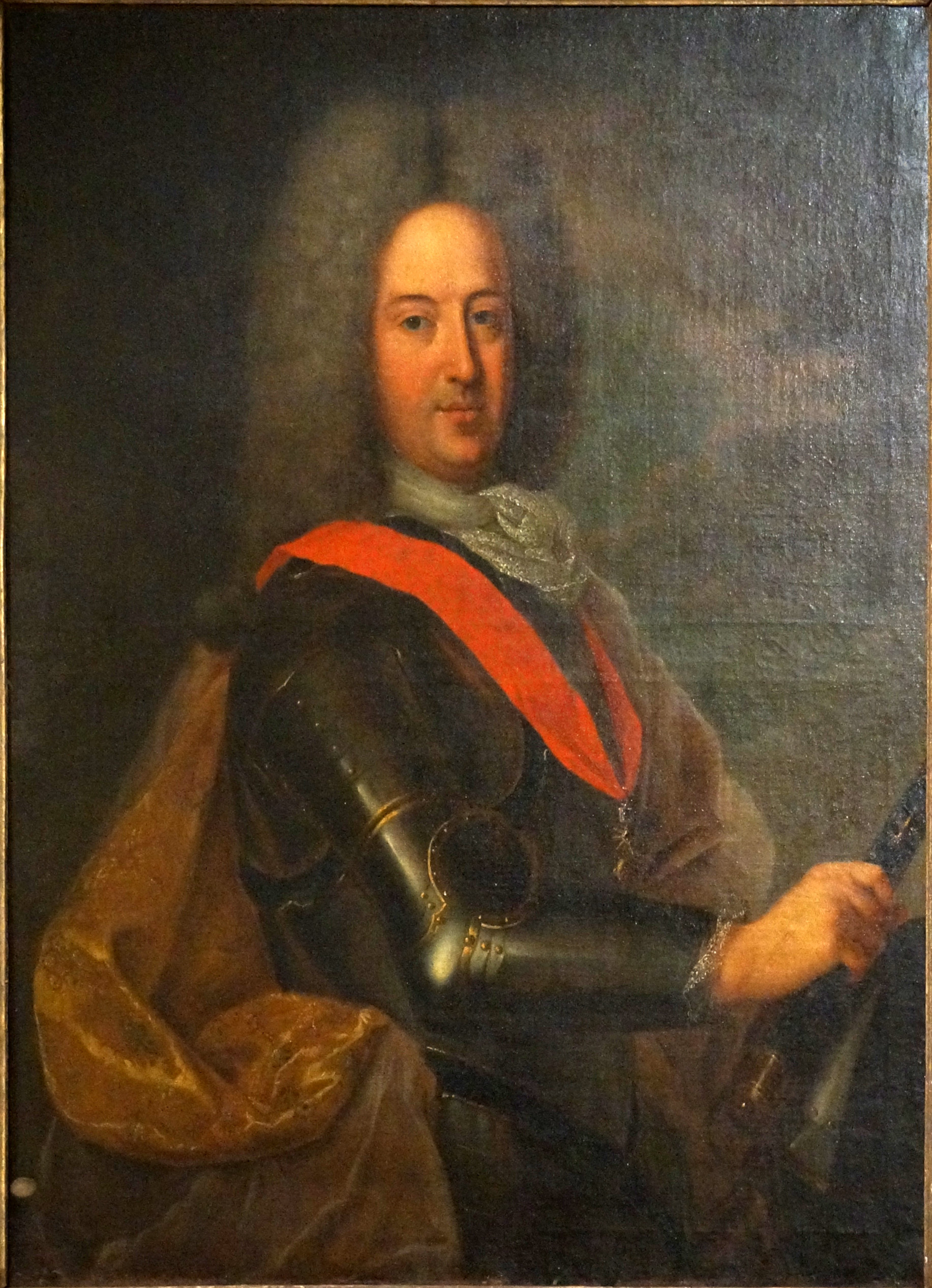
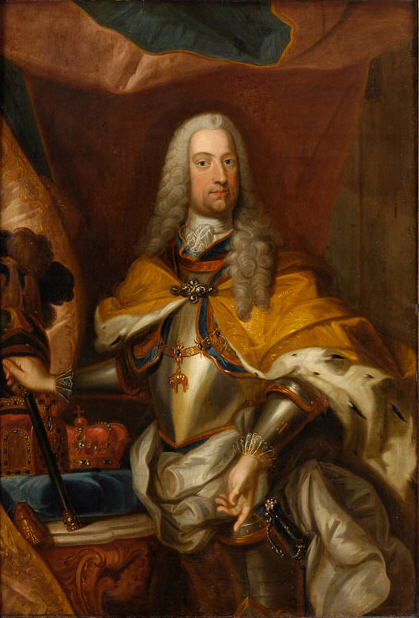
Portrait	Name	Start term	End term	Note
	René II	24 July 1473	10 December 1508	Grandson of René I and Isabella, and male-line descendant of John I; also Duke of Bar
	Antoine	10 December 1508	14 June 1544
	Francis I	14 June 1544	12 June 1545
	Charles III	12 June 1545	14 May 1608
	Henry II	14 May 1608	31 July 1624
	Nicole	31 July 1624	25 November 1625	She was the daughter of Henry II; the Estates of Lorraine eventually decided that she was not eligible to reign, and gave the crown to her uncle, Francis II; her husband and first cousin, Charles IV, would reign thereafter
	Francis II	25 November 1625	1 December 1625	He immediately abdicated in favour of his son, Charles IV; died 1632
	Charles IV	1 December 1625	19 January 1634	Abdicated in favour of his brother
	Nicholas II	19 January 1634	1 April 1634	Fled into exile and abdicated in favour of his older brother; the duchy remained under effective French control for the next 27 years
	Charles IV	1 April 1634	18 September 1675	Nominally restored as a result of his brother's abdication, Lorraine was occupied by France, and the Duke in exile, from 1634 to 1661 and again from 1670 until his death
	Charles V Leopold	18 September 1675	18 April 1690	He was in exile and Lorraine was occupied by France throughout his nominal reign
	Leopold	18 April 1690	27 March 1729	He was in exile and Lorraine was occupied by France until 30 October 1697, when it was returned to Léopold Joseph; it was again occupied by France from 1702 to 1714, although the duke remained in place
	Francis III Stephen	27 March 1729	9 July 1737	Traded Lorraine in exchange for the Grand Duchy of Tuscany; elected Holy Roman Emperor in 1745; died 1765, husband of Empress Maria Theresa

=== House of Leszczyński ===
Portrait

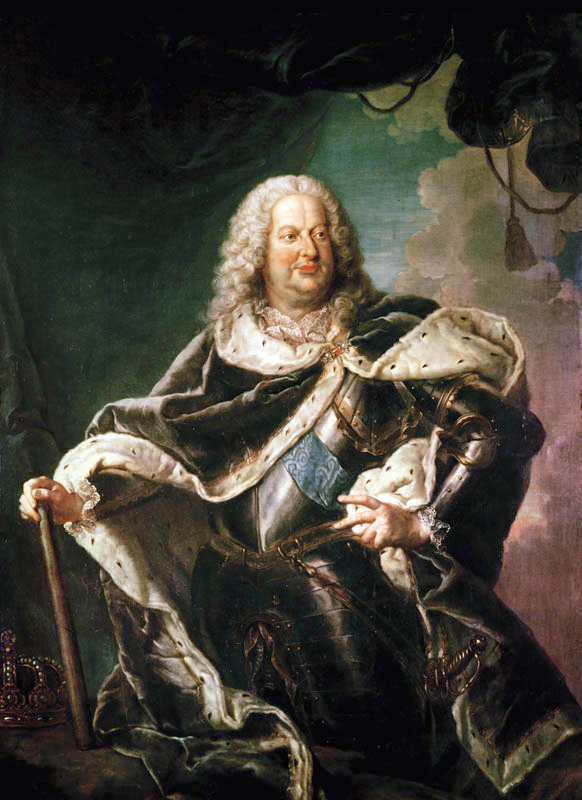

Name
Stanisław I
Start term
9 July 1737
End term
23 February 1766
Note
Former king of Poland. After him, the Duchy is inherited by his son-in-law, King Louis XV of France, and incorporated in his dominions

The House of Habsburg-Lorraine continued carrying the title as titular Dukes of Lorraine.

== See also ==
- Lorraine (duchy)
- Lorraine (province)
- Lorraine (region)
