= Château de Bruyères =

Ruined castle in France

Coordinates: 48°12′47″N 6°43′4″E

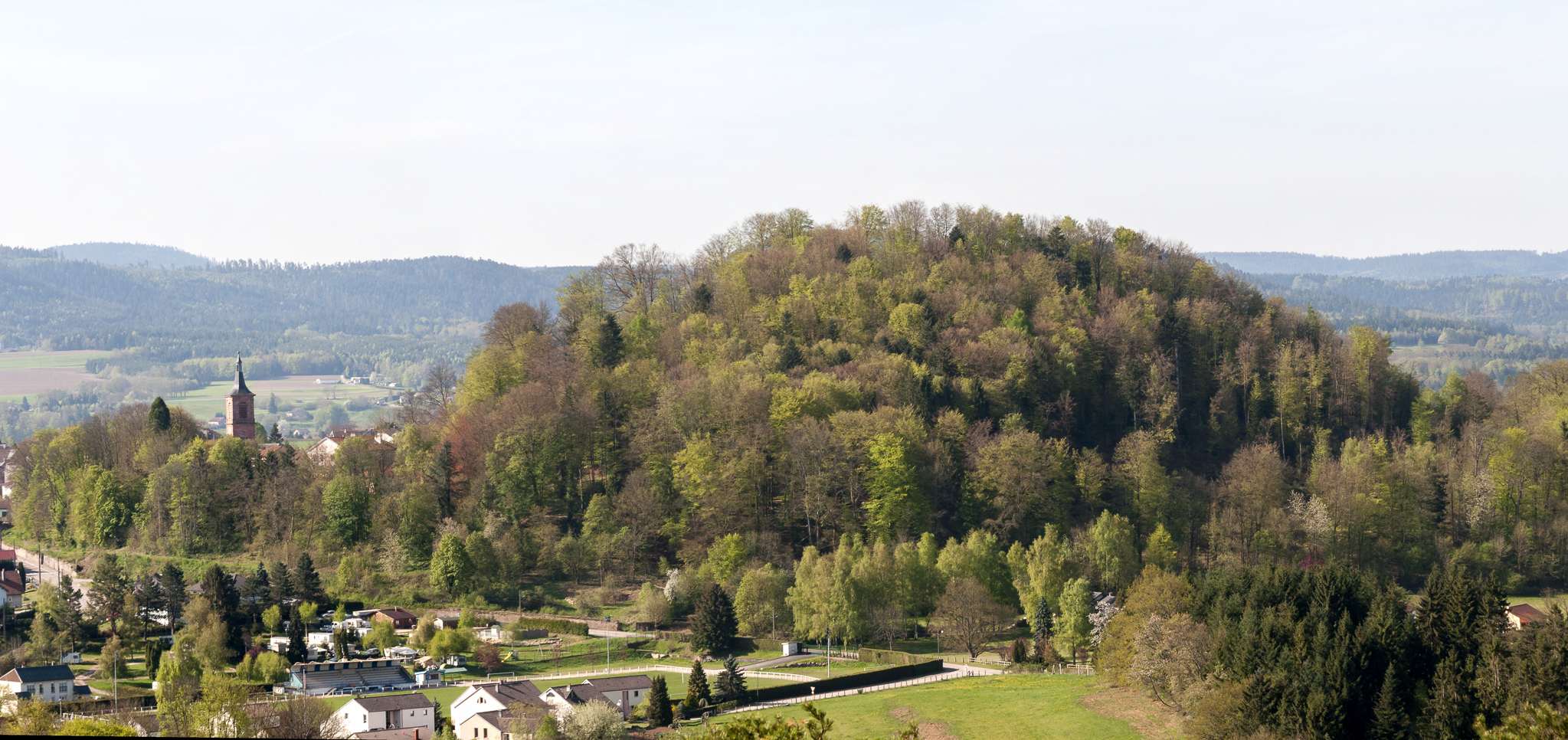
The hill of the château de Bruyères

The château de Bruyères is a ruined castle located in the town of Bruyères, in the Vosges department of eastern France.

== History ==
The castle was built during the 10th century by the Duke of Lorraine, on a small hill. According to the local history, the site has been fortified in the 6th century by a son of Clodio, King of the Franks.

Around 1178, Frederick I, Duke of Lorraine took over the castle and several domains and returned it to his elder brother, Simon II, Duke of Lorraine after the Treaty of Ribemont (1179).

It is said that Emperor Henri VI stayed there for hunting, in 1196.

The castle was destroyed by fire in 1715.

== Description ==
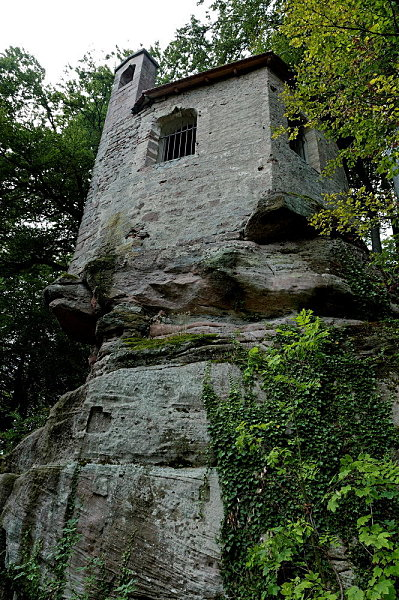
The ruins.

The castle had a rectangular shape; in the centre, the keep was protected by two enceintes. One of the two entrances was fortified by a large tower, named la Cabée.

The chapel, dedicated to Saint Blaise, is the last building still standing, in the east of the plateau.

== See also ==
- List of castles in France
