= Wierzchoslawa Ludmilla =

Duchess of Lorraine from 1205 to 1206

Wierzchoslawa Ludmilla (Polish: Wierzchosława Ludmiła Mieszkówna; b. bef. 1153 – d. bef. 1223), was a Polish princess member of the House of Piast, by marriage Lady of Bitsch and during 1205-1206 Duchess of Lorraine.

She was the second daughter and fourth child of Mieszko III the Old, Duke of Greater Poland and since 1173 High Duke of Poland, by his first wife Elisabeth, daughter of King Béla II of Hungary. Her name was probably given after High Duchess Viacheslava of Novgorod, wife of Bolesław IV the Curly, the ruling High Duke of Poland; with this gesture, Duke Mieszko III maybe showed an expression of warming relations between him and his brother the High Duke.

== Life ==
Around 1167, Wierzchoslawa Ludmilla married Frederick, Lord of Bitsch, second son of Duke Matthias I of Lorraine. The union was arranged by Frederick's maternal uncle Frederick I, Holy Roman Emperor during a visit to Poland. During her marriage, Wierzchoslawa Ludmilla bore her husband nine children:

- Frederick (who succeeded his father as Duke of Lorraine)
- Matthias (later Bishop of Toul)
- Philipp (Lord of Gerbéviller)
- Thierry (Lord of Autigny)
- Henry (Lord of Bayon)
- Agatha (Abbess of Remiremont)
- Judith (Countess of Salm)
- Hedwig (Countess of Zweibrücken)
- Cunigunda (d 1214) (Duchess of Limburg)

Wierzchosława Ludmilla became the contact between the French and Polish artistic representatives. One of the theories about the building of the famous Gniezno Doors states that thanks to her efforts, around 1180 the Doors came to her father's court.

After years of disputes between Frederick and his brother Duke Simon II of Lorraine, in 1205 he finally abdicated and entered a monastery. Then Frederick and Wierzchosława Ludmilla became duke and duchess. Frederick's rule was short-lived: he died one year later. Wierzchosława Ludmilla returned to Poland after the death of her husband, and remained there until her own death, around 1223.
