= Westrich (historic region) =

Former province of the Holy Roman Empire

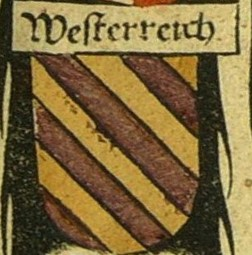
The coat of arms of Westrich ("The Holy Empire with all its territories" by Jost de Negker, after a woodcut by Hans Burgkmair the Elder, 1510)

Westrich (sometimes Westerreich or Westerrych), in Old French Wastriche or Vestric is the name of a former province of the Holy Roman Empire. The term is attested from the 13th century; the heart of this territory was located in the valley of the Saar, including its tributaries, the Blies, the Albe and the German Nied. Its boundaries, which fluctuated over time, were located to the east, along the northern Vosges and the Pfälzerwald, to the west along the Moselle between Sierck and Saarburg, to the south along the valley of the Seille to the north, along the Nahe. In the Holy Roman Empire, Westrich constitutes a veritable mosaic of territories; The latter are shared between numerous lordships, including the duchies of Lorraine, Palatinate-Deux-Ponts, Duchy of Luxembourg, as well as the Prince-Bishopric of Metz, the archbishopric of Trier, the Elector palatine, the County of Nassau-Saarbrücken, County Palatine of Veldenz, La Petite-Pierre de Deux-Ponts-Bitche. The name "Westrich" slowly fell into disuse after the ravages caused to this province by the Thirty Years' War. Today it is a "phantom province" which covers the current territories of Saarland, the North-East of the Moselle including Dieuze, the Alsace bossue, and the South-West of the Rhineland-Palatinate (Südwestpfalz).

== Definition and limits ==
=== The Westrich and its context in the 16th century ===
The boundaries of Westrich have fluctuated over the centuries.

==== Waldseemüller map ====
The oldest map is apparently the one that Martin Waldseemüller drew up at an unknown date but before 1508 in the workshop of the Gymnase de Saint-Dié-des-Vosges and published by Jean Schott in Strasbourg in 1513; the cartographer, in the service of the René II, Duke of Lorraine, represents in an indicative manner the respective provinces of Westrich (VASTI REGNI DOMINI) and the Duchy of Lorraine (LOTHARINGIE DUCATUS), thus named in their coats of arms located at the top of the map.

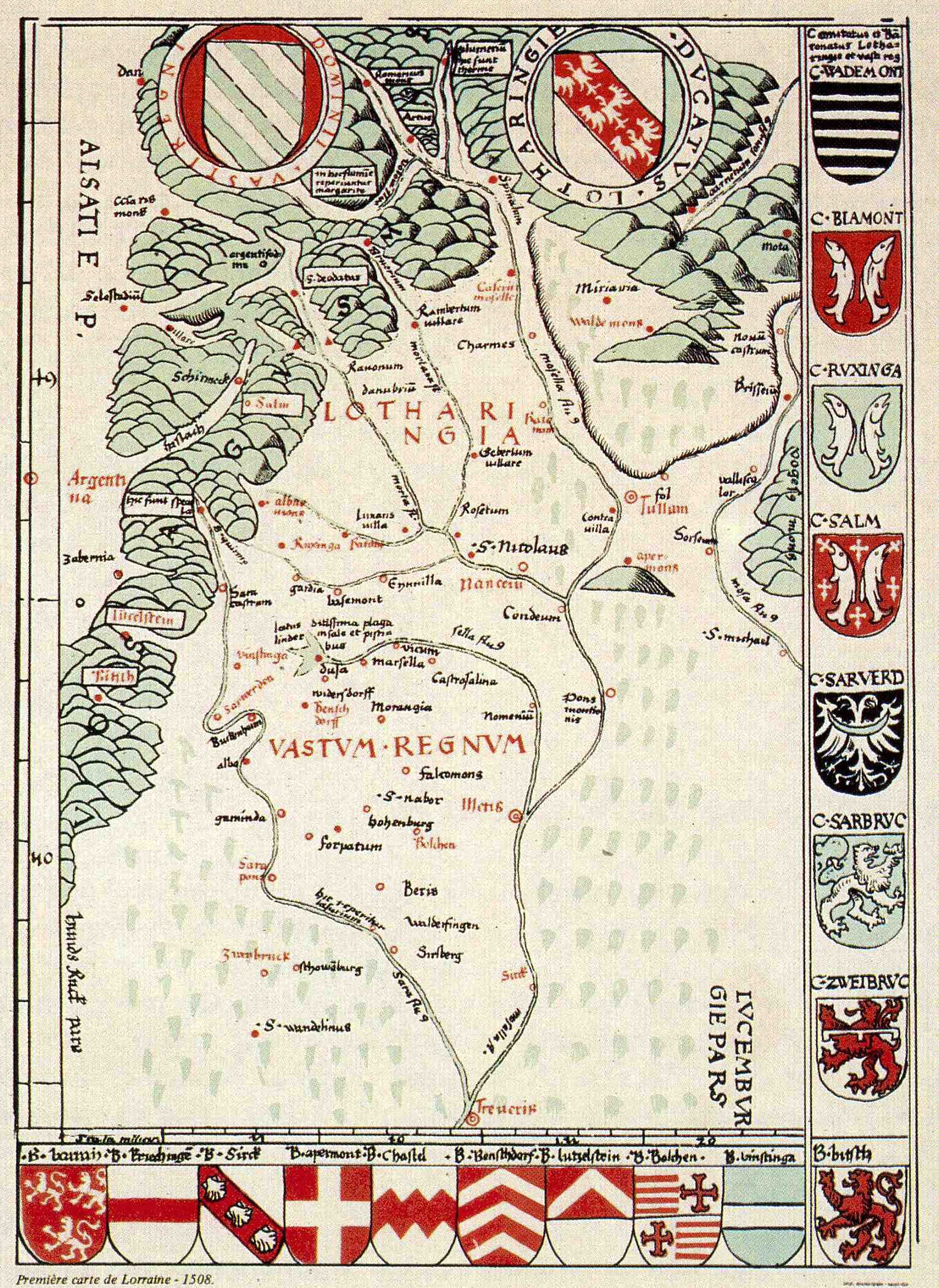
The Westrich (Vastum Regnum) as a space neighboring the Duchy of Lorraine (Lotharingia) and located north of the Seille (North at the bottom of the map). Map Created by Martin Waldseemuller

The two provinces being shown in a perspective going from North to South, the Vosges are on the left; on the right and at the bottom of the map are coats of arms of various counties of the Duchy of Lorraine and Westrich:

For the Westrich:

- south
  - Blâmont
  - Réchicourt-le-Château
  - Salm
- to the north
  - Sarrewerden
  - Saarbrücken
  - Duchy of Deux-Ponts

from which is omitted, perhaps for political reasons, the fief of the Counts of Dabo, around Dagsburg.

Seven baronies are attached to:

- Parroy
- Sirck (Sierck-les-Bains)
- Benschdorf (Bénestroff)
- Lützelstein (La Petite-Pierre)
- Bolchen (Boulay-Moselle)
- Vinstingen (Fénétrange)
- Bitsch (Bitche)

among which an eighth, Kriechingen (Créhange), is also missing.

The representation of this territory seems to have been more cultural and geographical, than political and/or seigneurial; today it corresponds roughly to the territories of Saulnois, German Lorraine, Alsace Bossue, the Land of Saarland, and the southwest of the Land of Palatinate.

==== Münster map ====
Another map, made by Sebastian Münster around 1550, is titled "Another Chart of the River Rhine, Including the Palatinate, the Westrich and the Eiffel, etc."

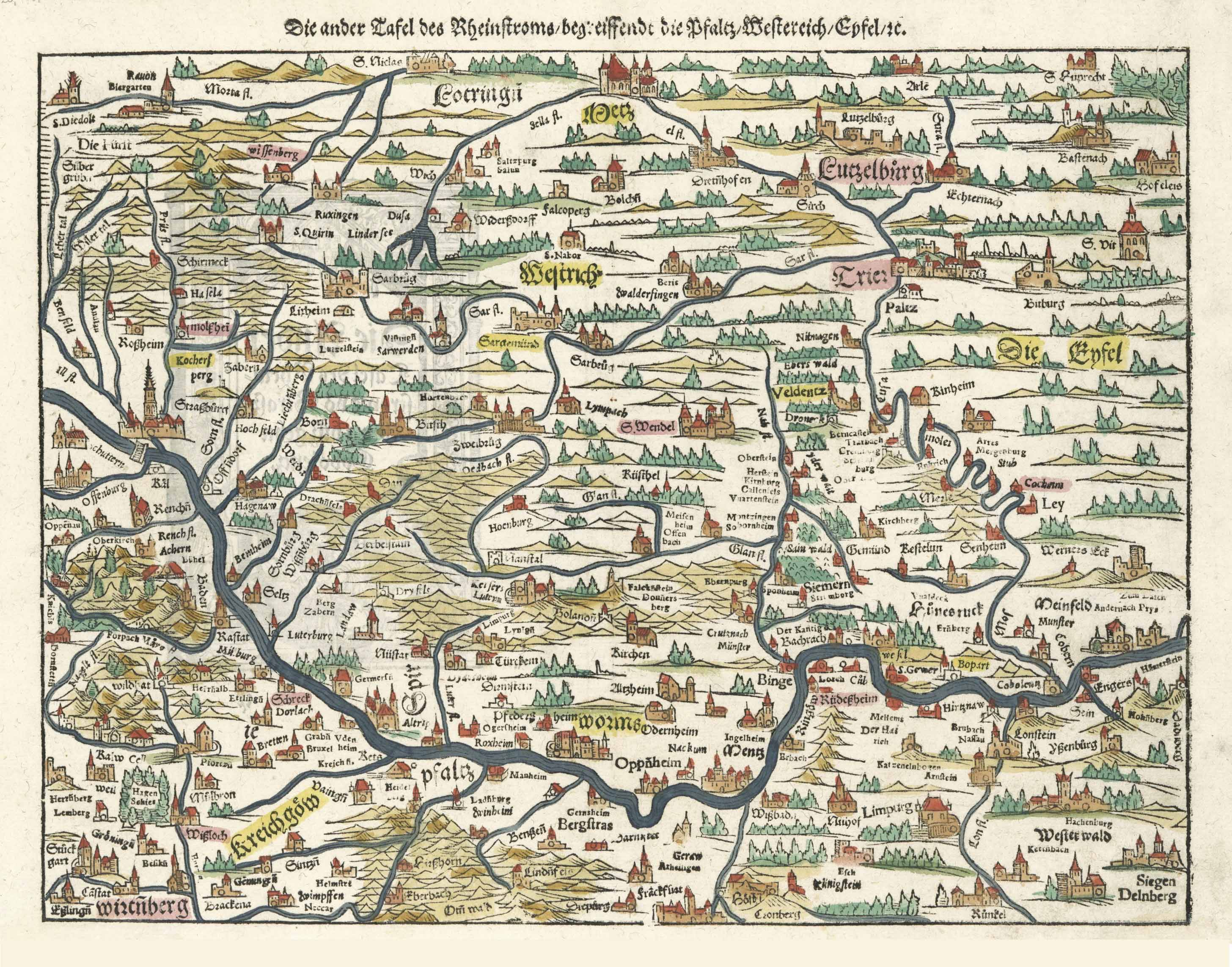
Map of the Rhine Valley including the Palatinate, Westrich, Eifel (Sebastian Munster, around 1550).

The centre of the old province (where the term Westrich is inserted) would be located between the localities of Sarrebourg (Sarburg), Bérus (Beris) and Vaudrevange (Walderfingen). Its southern limits would pass around Saint-Quirin (S. Quirin), Réchicourt-le-Château (Ruxingen), Dieuze (Dusa), Vic-sur-Seille (Wich), Château-Salins (Salzpurg, Salun); the western limits with the Metz region would be around Faulquemont (Falcoperg), Boulay-Moselle (Bolchñ); a little further north, near Thionville (Dietñhofen) Sierck-les-Bains (Sirch); to the north, the landmarks are more imprecise; from the confluence zone between Saar and Moselle the limits would schematically go towards Sankt Wendel (S. Wendel) then Kaiserslautern (Keiserslutern); to the east, it is more obvious, located along the hills of the Pfälzerwald and the Northern Vosges, on the outskirts of Zweibrücken (Zweibrug), Bitche (Bitsch), La Petite-Pierre (Lutzelstein) and Lixheim.

The surrounding provinces indicated are respectively: to the south, the Duchy of Lorraine (Lotringñ), to the west, the city of Metz (city free of the Empire), the County of Luxembourg (Lutzelburg); to the north, we find the archiepiscopate of Trier (Trier), the Eifel north of the Moselle, and the County Palatine of Veldenz (Veldentz), near the Nahe; to the east, the Palatinate is indicated between the Lauter and the city of Bingen am Rhein, its center is Worms.

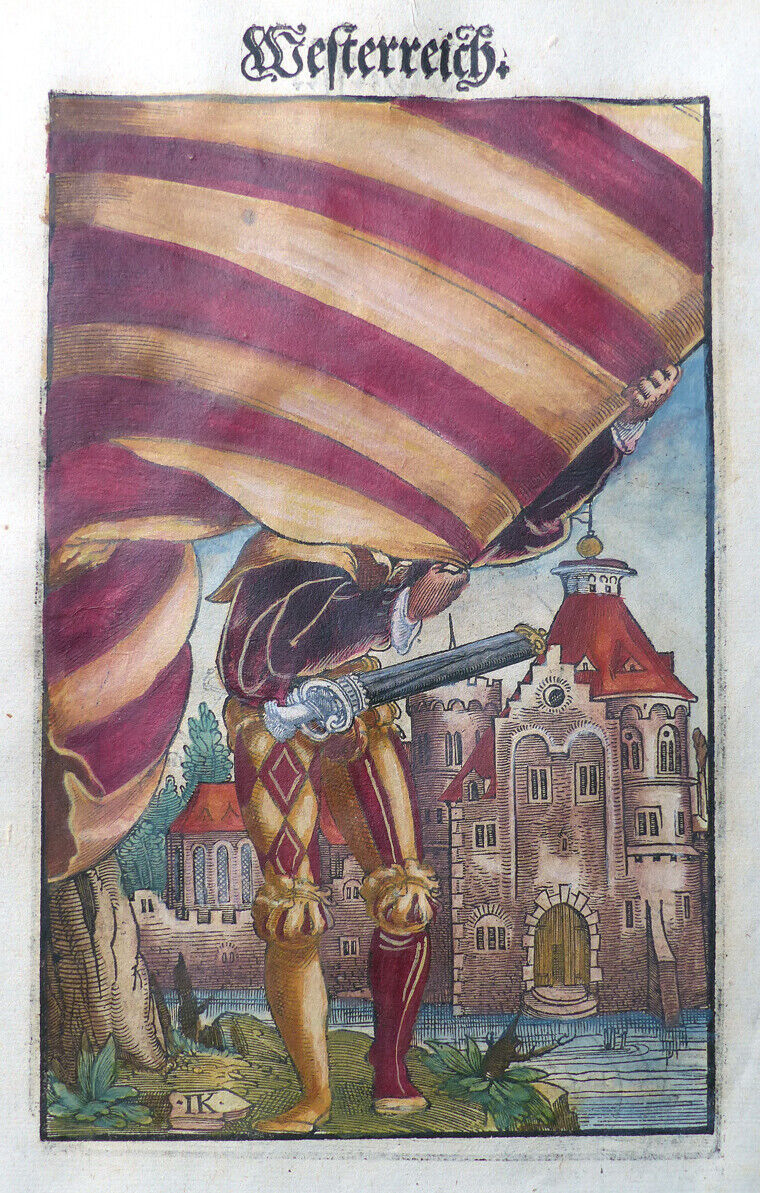
Flag bearer presenting the banner of "Westerreich"

=== Westrich in contemporary history ===
On the French side today, the Westrich has known a relative survival in the "German Lorraine" (or German-speaking Moselle), in the part corresponding to the countries of Sarrebourg, Sarreguemines, Nied Allemande, Warndt, the country of Sierck, the former County of Deux-Ponts-Bitche, which are today in the department of Moselle. The contemporary use of the term Westrich, apart from the German exception, very restrictive compared to its ancient use, has remained used by historians of the Middle Ages and the Renaissance, such as Henri Hiegel in France. Franco-German conferences on the theme of the Westrich and its history have brought together historians from Moselle, Saarland, bossue Alsace and the West Palatinate.

On the side that became German, the name Westrich is still sometimes used today by the inhabitants of the south of the Nahe and the west of the Palatine Forest ridges to designate their territory, that is to say the East of the Saar, the Bliesgau and the territory around Saint-Wendel as well as the interior of the former department of Mont-Tonnerre south of the Nahegau.

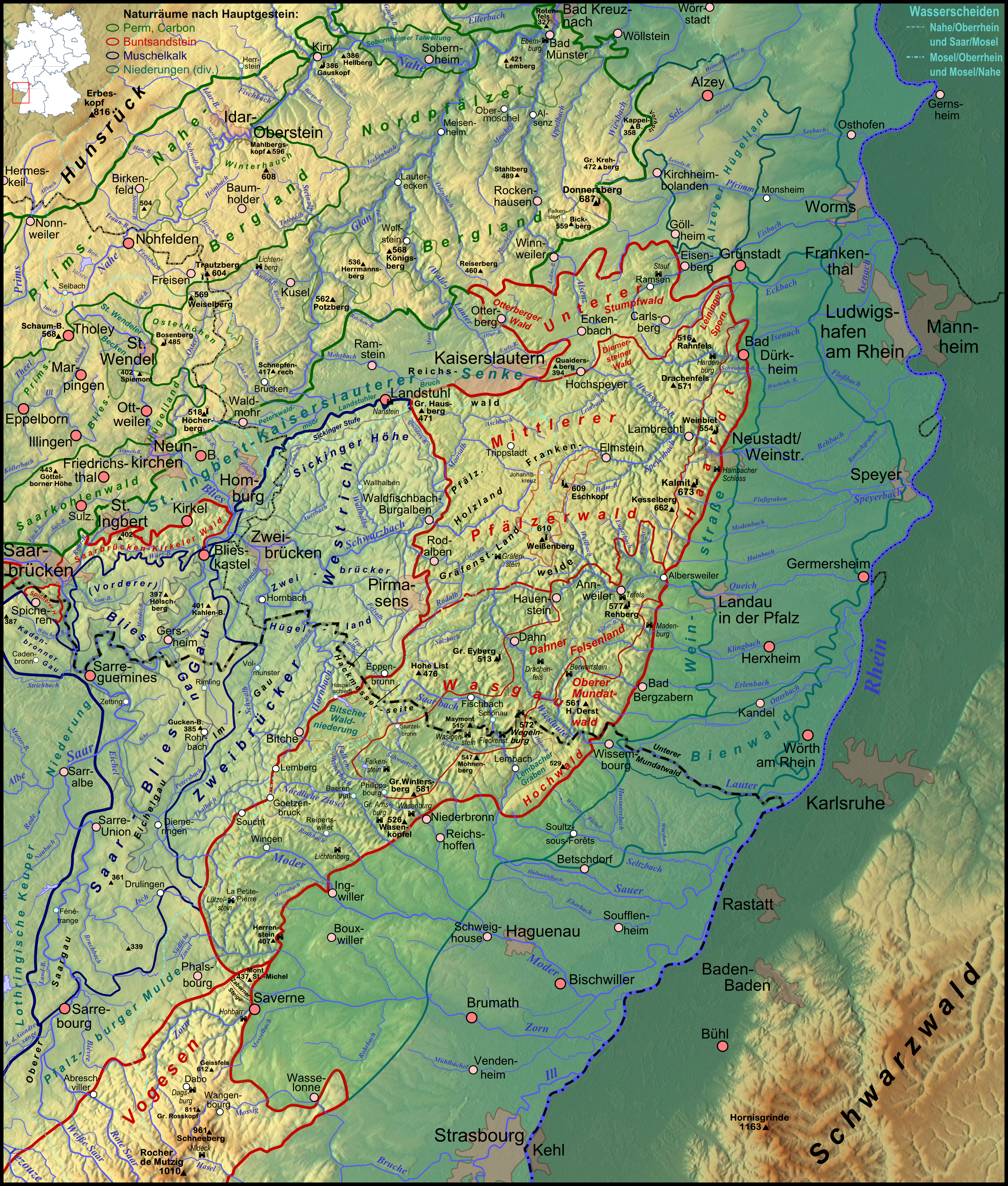
Contemporary German map showing the name Westrich in a restricted sense (Zweibrücker Westrich).

In a recent map, we find the term in a restricted sense, under the name "Zweibrücker Westrich", this expression designating a territory which extends between Deux-Ponts and the crest of the Pfälzerwald and the Northern Vosges, the east of the Pays de Bitche, up to La-Petite-Pierre.

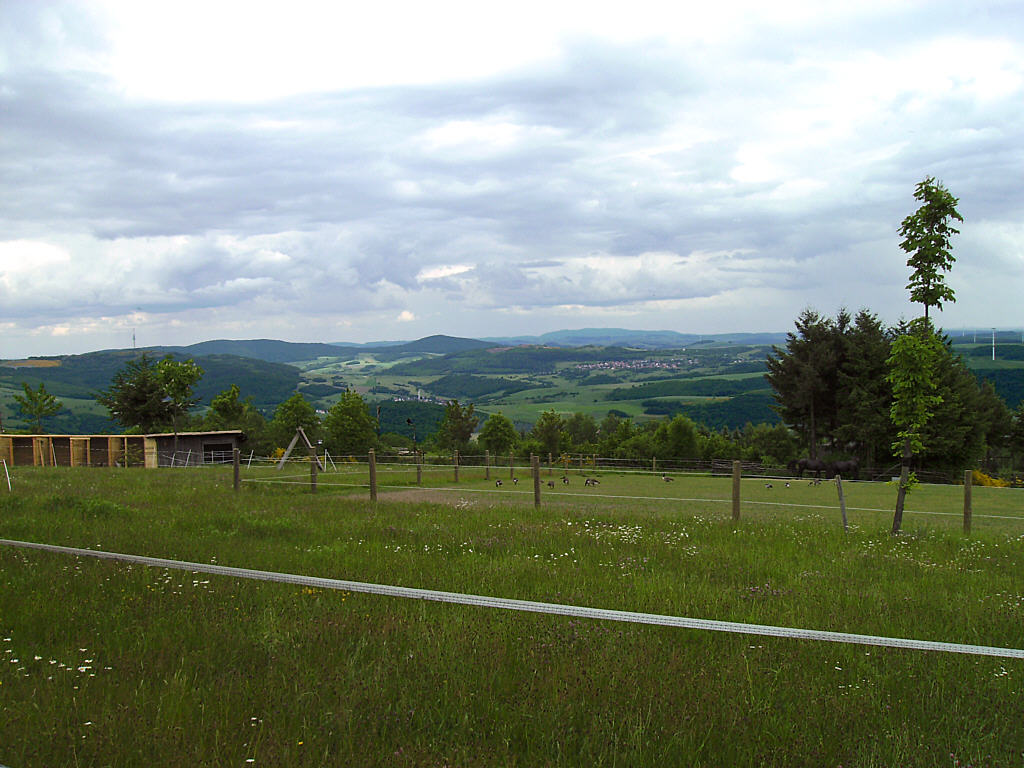
Westrich landscape.

=== Etymology ===
Westrich is a form of the contemporary German Westerreich meaning "kingdom of the West"; its structure is comparable to that of the term Österreich for "kingdom of the East" (Austriche in Middle French, then Austria). Emerging in the 13th century, this concept then arose as a pendant to Austria, at a time when the Wittelsbachs asserted their power on the one hand towards the east over Bavaria and on the other hand towards the west over the Palatinate by Palatinate-Deux-Ponts in 1394. Westrich and Austria thus appear as the western and eastern neighboring domains of the Wittelsbachs, if not as a display of their territorial ambitions.

The Latin translation is Westrichia or Westratia. Martin Waldseemuller, cartographer of the Duke of Lorraine René II of Vaudemont and Anjou, designates it by a play on words Vastum Regnum, that is to say "Vast Kingdom" which connotes the undertones of devastation, emptiness and therefore availability, for ideological reasons, namely to present it as a natural domain of annexation to the Duchy of Lorraine and not as a western part of the Empire and the province of the Palatinate. Its original meaning of "west of the Palatinate" (= of the Holy Empire) is thus erased.

=== Blazon ===
The Westrich not being a well-defined fief but a mosaic of fiefs which became a stake in rivalries between regional and local princes and lords, the images vary. An imaginary coat of arms was attributed to it by a kind of genealogical claim, namely coticé of gold and azure of eight pieces This coat of arms, claimed by René II of Lorraine as prior to that of the House of Lorraine, reflects an imaginary linking Lotharingia to Austrasia coat of arms, equally imaginary but taken up with a border of gules broken by a Burgundy claiming to reconstitute the ancient Lotharingia, were banded with six pieces of gold and azure. Similarly, we find in a later armorial the arms of Westrich almost identical to those of Austrasia, banded with six pieces of silver and azure.

Furthermore, the name Westrich survives as a surname; it is rare, and present mainly in the area covering and surrounding the historical territory, that is to say in Germany, the east of the Saar and the west of the Palatinate, and in France, in Lorraine and Alsace.

== History ==
In ancient times, the western part of early Belgium was crossed by the "via regalis" linking Divodurum (Metz) to Mongotiacum (Mainz) and Borbetomagus (Worms) via the future Villa Luthra (Kaiserslautern). It crossed at the current place called Champ noir, between the current Saarbrücken and Homburg, the road linking Augusta Trevorum (Trier), capital of the Roman or secessionist Gauls, and Argentoratum (Strasbourg) along the Saravus valley (Saar) via Martiaticum (Merzig) and Pons Saravi (Saarburg).

The Lion in the colours of the Hohenstauffen appeared in 1190 on coins of Conrad I and gained a crown with the Golden Bull. It has since been adopted by many cantons of German Westrich.

=== The Far West of the Palatinate (880-1525) ===
==== An intermediate zone between the centers of power ====
Springing on the borders of Upper Germania from the cities of the Treveri, which occupy the lower Moselle, for its northern part and of the Mediomatrici, which are upstream, for its southern part, then respectively from the dioceses of the archbishop of Trier and the bishop of Metz, this territory emerges from the High Middle Ages by its margins:

- in 903, the Franconian Gebhard, Count of Rheingau, attached to his own domain, the heart of the future Palatinate, the title of Duke of Lotharingia, with which the future Westrich made the connection
- in 982, Sarrebourg, a commercial stopover towards Alsace, obtained from the bishop of Metz the right to mint coins
- between 1047 and 1048, the Alsatian Adalbert, Duke of Lorraine, had the castle of Langenstein built, the base of the county of Salm
- in 1074, Conrad II the Salic, Count of Speyer, made Lautern an imperial court
- in 1152, Frederick of Hohenstaufen made it the residence of the King of the Romans while installing his younger brother, Conrad, in Heidelberg at the head of the Palatinate
- In 1179, the Treaty of Ribemont separated the future Westrich from Upper Lotharingia

==== Development and birth of Westrich in the 13th century ====
The Westrich acquired its name in the following century. This was the period when the Habsburgs and the Capetians built their national territories and which ended in 1299 with the meeting of Quatrevaux during which the border between the Empire and the Kingdom was fixed on the Meuse.

The term Westrich itself is mentioned in a document from 1295, the oldest that remains. Its fiefs are described in many later documents including, a century and a half later, a map by Nicholas of Cusa, a Westrichois by birth. This name, which means kingdom or region of the West in German, indicates a settlement around a few agricultural and forest lordships, such as that of the Wild Counts of Salm, and a few isolated abbeys, such as that of Herbitzheim, organized from the right bank of the Rhine and Heidelberg, capital of the Lower Palatinate or Palatinate of the Rhine.

From traditional operations, there also developed during the 13th century, thanks to the inventions one hundred and fifty years earlier of the camshaft mill and the horse harness which doubled the productivity of logging, industrial centres which benefited from the resources of wood and water and supplied the neighbouring princely and episcopal courts with ores and metals, paper and salt, such as Marsal, and ceramics and glass, such as Sarrebourg. In 1357, the Counts Palatine made the imperial palace of Kaiserslautern their own. In 1394 Robert of Wittelsbach annexed part of the County of Zweibrücken, renamed Palatinate-Zweibrücken, one of the five regions of the Palatinate, west of the Rhine.

==== Social upheavals closing the Middle Ages ====
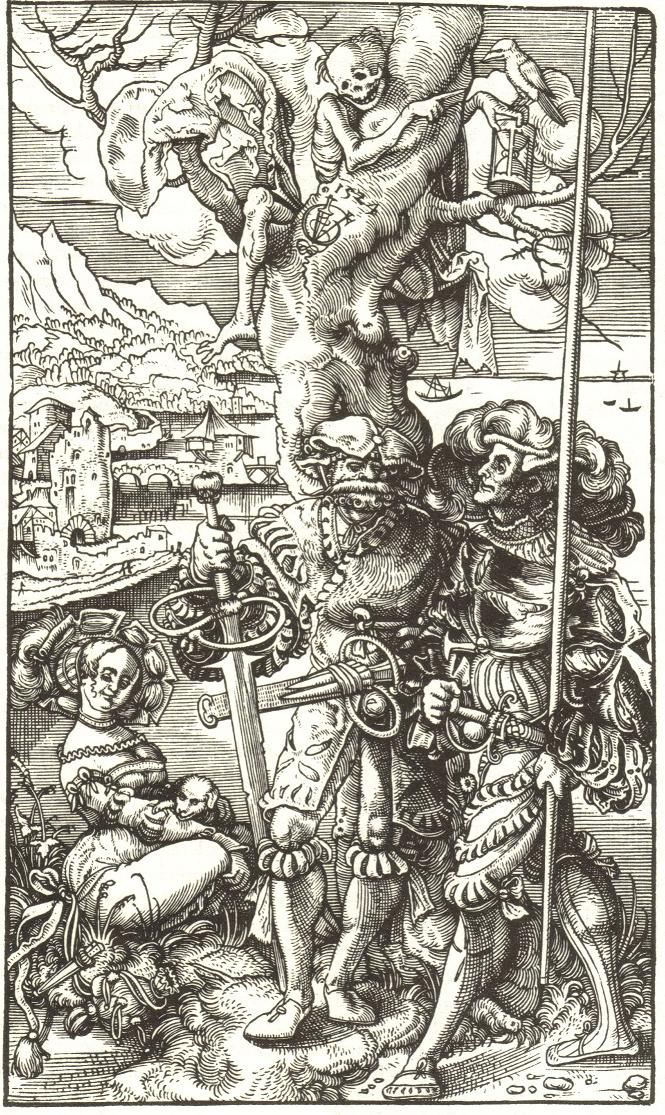
Mercenaries, prostitution and massacres were, during the civil and religious war, the fate of rural and border areas such as Westrich, Switzerland and Flanders.

Economic and demographic development did not go without exacerbating the conflicts between the bourgeoisie and the local nobility, who sometimes tried not to deviate by taking on the positions of ironmaster or master glassmaker. As early as 1381, Sarreck Castle was burned down by the merchants of Sarrebourg. Eighty-three years later, on November 2, 1464, the central power was forced to intervene and the Duke of Lorraine, John of Anjou and Calabria, took Sarrebourg to make it a permanent garrison.

The downgrading in the face of the triumphant bourgeoisie of the minor nobility, unable to provide for the army and reduced to theft and vendetta that followed, competed with by the infantry of the Landsknechts and Swiss in the service of rich bankers, tempted by the secularization of the clergy's property and encouraged by the Lutheran protest, provoked the mutiny of the knights of the Palatinate. It was led during the years 1522 and 1523 in the Westrich by a union formed, like the Swabian League, around Franz von Sickingen, lord of Nanstein Castle. This year of violence marked a collapse of the social order and a halt to the preeminence of the Count Palatine and the Elector, Prince Archbishop of Trier, in the region.

This was followed in 1525 by the "Herbitzheim upheaval", a gathering place for the "peasants" of Bliesgau, Saargau and the German bailiwick of Lorraine leaving to join Erasmus Gerber in Saverne in his war against the Peasants. The repression led by Duke Antoine gave him, in the eyes of his imperial peers, the legitimacy to establish an order in a region known to be savage within the Circle of the Rhine, which the Counter-Reformation would very quickly come to its aid.

=== The Vastum Regnum and the Duchy of Lorraine (1526-1659) ===
==== Lorraine expansionism ====
From then on, the Vosges part of the Westrich became the object of the progressive and systematic expansionism of the Duchy of Lorraine, already present in the lower part since the condominium on Merzig concluded in 1368 by Raoul the Valiant with the Archbishop of Trier. The pressure of the Dukes of Lorraine was considerably reinforced following the Peasants' War, the progressive conception of a fighting Catholicism, and a "frontier of Catholicity"; the uniqueness and internal complementarity of the Westrich would succumb during the most terrible phase, the European conflict of the Thirty Years' War. Successively fell into the ban of the House of Lorraine, by increasing its German bailiwick up to the current Franco-German borders and the lower third of the current Land of Saarland :

- in 1527, the county of Sarrewerden
- in 1560, the county of Blâmont
- in 1562, - the city of Sarrebourg militarily occupied for a century, the town of Sarralbe
- in 1571, the county of Deux-Ponts-Bitche
- in 1576, the castellany of Hombourg - Saint-Avold, purchased in 1581 directly by the Duke of Lorraine, Charles III
- in 1584, Phalsbourg
- in 1591, by marriage, an undivided half of the county of Salm
- in 1593, Marsal
- in 1600, Turquestein
- in 1623, Lixheim
- In 1629, the county of Sarrewerden was militarily confiscated by its overlord

==== The Reformation and the division of Westrich ====
This annexation of 1629, with that of Bockenheim, was ratified by an agreement with the Protestant Nassau. In 1556, during the Council of Trent, the Lutheran Reformation had been introduced by preachers close to the co-prince Adolf of Nassau in Sarrewerden, in conflict with the Duke of Lorraine, in the county of Sarrewerden. This was the origin of its future attachment to Alsace. The reform concerned education, by opening establishments, worship, by training priests, administration, by eliminating Catholics, and morals, by prohibiting festivals such as the Saint-Jean fires. In 1575, it was the county of Saarbrücken, newly led by Philip IV of Nassau-Weilburg, which had been reformed by the preacher Gebhardt Beilstein. The annexation of 1629 therefore exposed the inhabitants of the county to the Counter-Reformation.

==== The Thirty Years' War ====
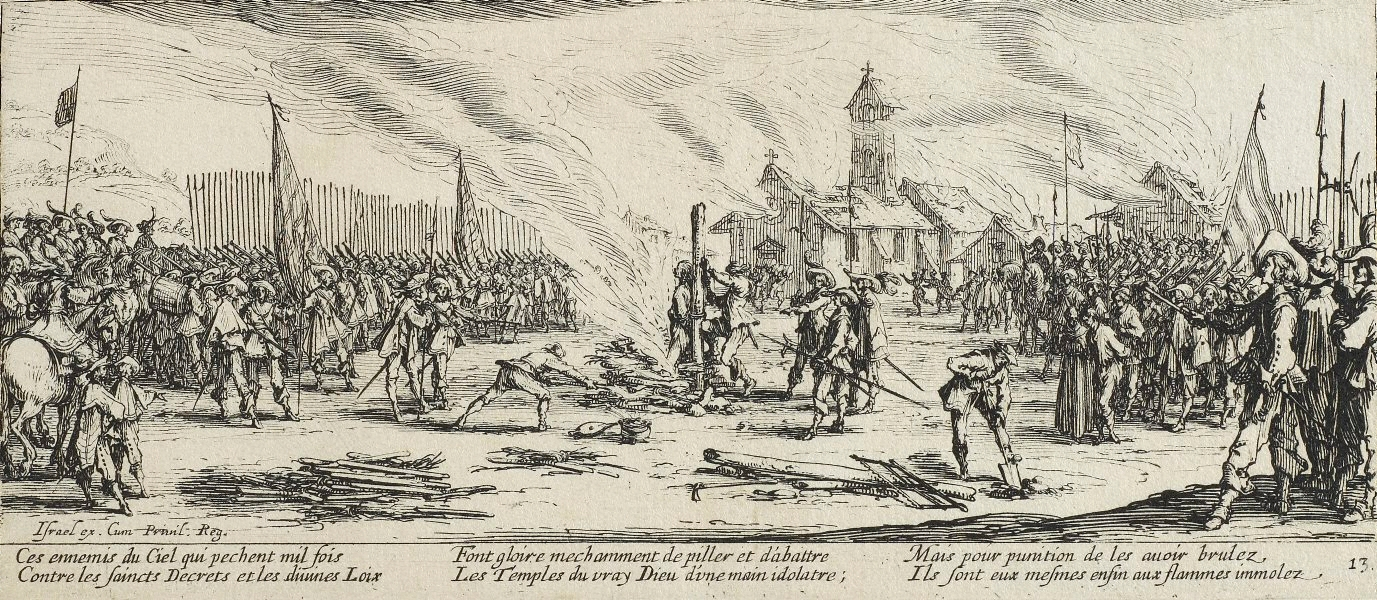
The Stake - Jacques Callot - 1633.

Westrich was hit hard by the Thirty Years' War and some areas were depopulated. For example, Saarbrücken lost at least 60% of its population.

In 1635, Matthias Gallas, in the service of the Catholic League, founded by the Wittelsbachs of Bavaria and led by the Duke of Lorraine in exile, besieged Deux-Ponts defended by Reinhold von Rosen in the service of the Protestant Union, founded by the Wittelsbachs of the Palatinate and allied with France. The city was razed.

The population of Kaiserslautern was massacred or driven out by the Croats of Gallas ' lieutenant, Melchior von Hatzfeldt twice, in July on the way there, in November on the way back.

Berus, because it belonged to Lorraine, was destroyed by the Swedish armies of Axel Oxenstierna, allied with France since the Treaty of Barwald on the Protestant side. The city was not rebuilt until forty-five years later, seven kilometers downstream, under the name of Saarlouis.

Two years later, in 1637, there were only seventy survivors in destroyed Saarbrücken.

Epidemics of plague and famines followed.

=== The Franco-Swedish Saar (1660-1815) ===
Around 1665, Sarreck, Fénétang, Sarrewerden, Sarralbe, Sarreguemines and Bitche were formed by the Duke of Lorraine Charles IV into a duchy of "Sareland" for the benefit of his adulterous son, the Prince of Vaudémont, which duchy returned in 1707 to the Duke of Lorraine.

This did not prevent the Kingdom from continuing its policy of encircling imperial Lorraine. In 1677, following the Battle of Consarbrück, Saarbrücken was burned down, with only eight houses remaining standing. In 1680, the troops of Marshal Duras invested Deux-Ponts. Immediately the Saar (county of Saarbrücken increased by the region of Saarlouis) and the bossue Alsace (county of Sarrewerden), as a temporal part of the diocese of Metz, one of the Three Bishoprics, were reunited with France, as were Alsace and Franche -Comté, and Saarlouis was founded. The entire region was occupied up to the Rhine and the Saar was entrusted to an intendant, Antoine Bergeron de la Goupillière.

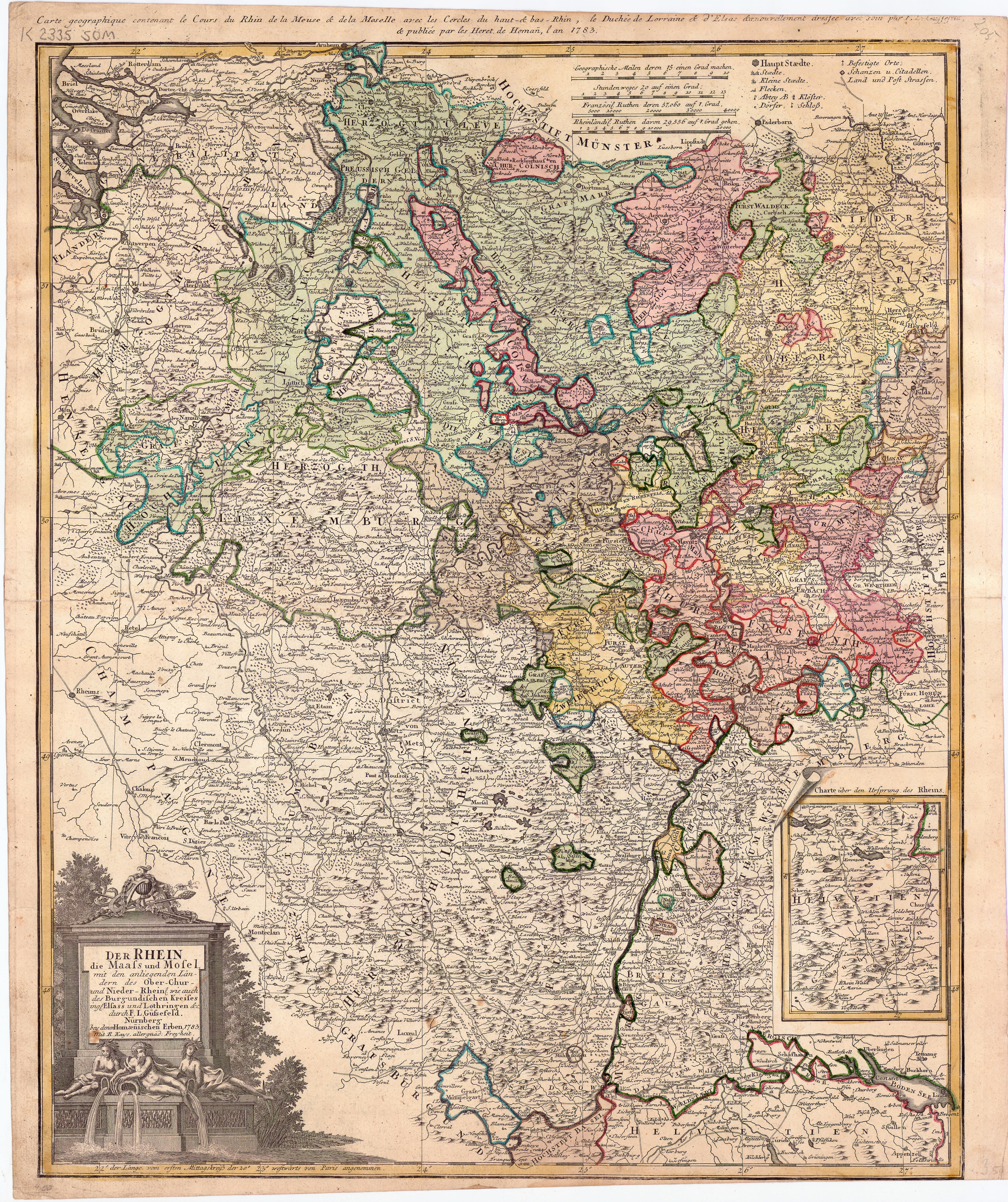
Map from 1783 showing the political fragmentation of the former Westrich.

In 1690, despite the protests of the Archbishop of Trier, this confiscation was confirmed by the Treaty of Ryswick on the sole bailiwick of Saarlouis, possession of the ousted Duke of Lorraine, and the following year, on the death without issue of its Duke, the Palatinate-Deux-Ponts was transmitted to the King of Sweden, an ally of France, which did not evacuate its troops and dissolve the intendancy until 1697.

Between the two foreign powers, the county of Saarbrücken, restored to Nassau-Ottweiler and Nassau-Saarbrücken, became in the 18th century a pole of development attracting Huguenots and other Protestant refugees, the hub of the future Saar. This stabilization, exceptional for two centuries, would last until 1780. It also benefited the Lorraine side of Westrich where Duke Leopold favored immigrants from Tyrol and Switzerland who came to repopulate a devastated country. Some lordships of this area continued to form Germanic enclaves in ducal Lorraine and in the kingdom of France, until the Revolution which ousted the possessed princes to unify the national territory.

The Treaty of Paris in 1815 brought about a final change of border by shifting Saarlouis and the valley of the middle Saar, Lorraine for almost half a millennium, to the Prussian side.

== Cities ==
Cities of Westrich:

=== France (Moselle department) ===
- Bitche
- Saint-Avold
- Sarreguemines
- Fénétrange
- Phalsbourg
- Rechicourt-le-Château
- Morhange
- Faulquemont
- Boulay
- Dieuze
- Sierck-les-Bains
- Sarrebourg
- Forbach
- Creutzwald

=== Germany (Saarland and Rhineland-Palatinate) ===
- Baumholder
- Blieskastel
- Homburg
- Kaiserslautern
- Saarbrücken
- Saint Wendel
- Kusel
- Landstuhl
- Pirmasens
- Zweibrücken

== Personalities ==
- Nicholas of Cusa
- Johannes Lichtenberger
- Franz von Sickingen
- Johann Michael Moscherosch
- Johann Fischart

== Notes and references ==
=== Bibliography ===
- Benoît, L. (1861). "Notes sur la Lorraine allemande - Le Westrich". Mémoires de la Société d'archéologie lorraine. II. XI (3). Nancy: A. Lepage impr.
- Eiselé, A. (1990). "The 'Lotharingia-Vastum Regnum' map of 1508-1513: Observations and reflections". Les Cahiers lorrains (3–4). Metz: Société d'histoire et d'archeologie de la Lorraine. ISSN 0758-6760.
- Eiselé, A. (1991). "Le Westrich. Outline of an explanation". Les Cahiers lorrains (1). Metz: Society of history and archaeology of Lorraine. ISSN 0758-6760.
