= Frederick, Duke of Lorraine =

Frederick, Duke of Lorraine may refer to:

- Frederick I, Duke of Lorraine
- Frederick II, Duke of Lorraine
- Frederick III, Duke of Lorraine
- Frederick IV, Duke of Lorraine
