= Ribemont =

- Commune
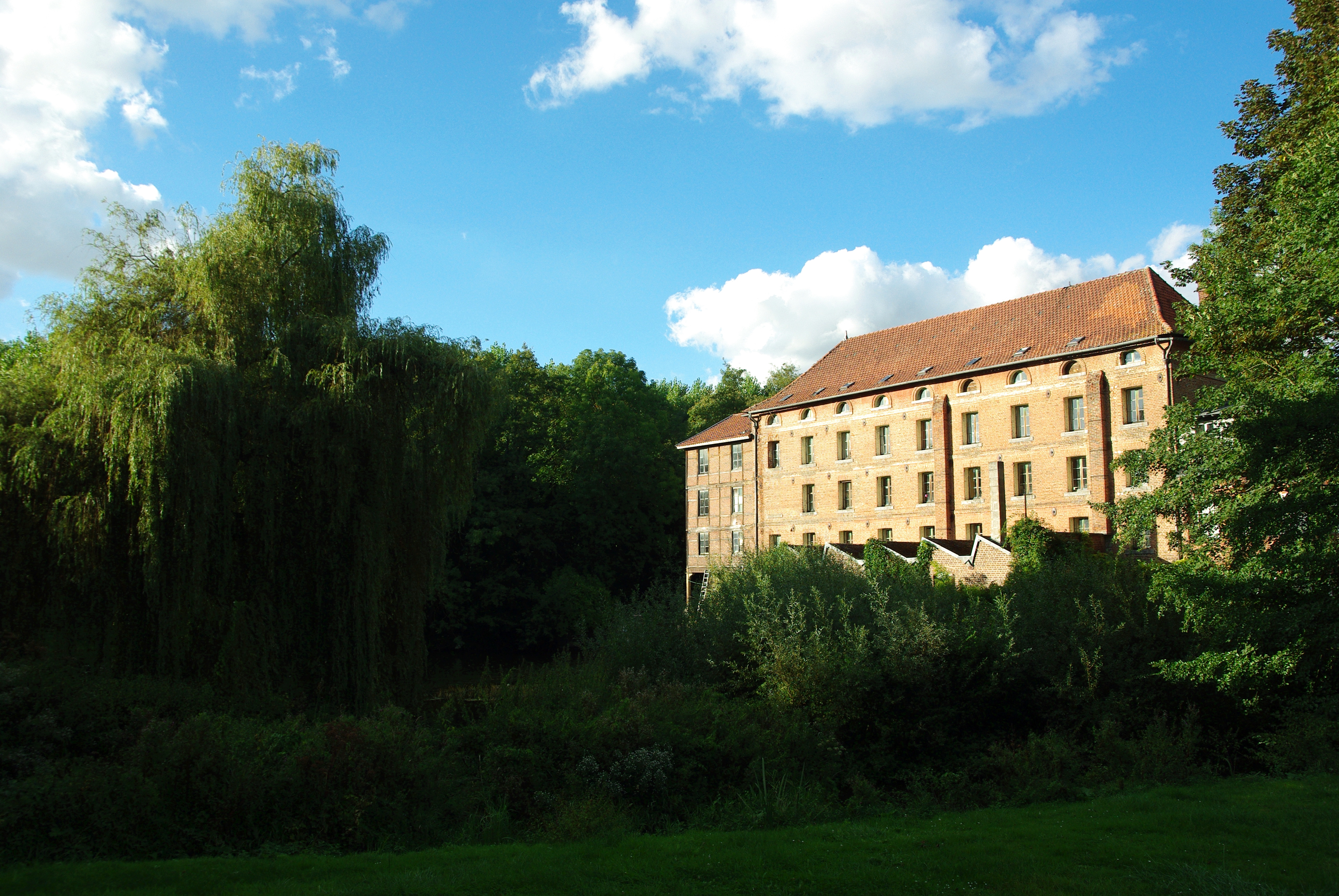
- Lucy mill

- Coat of arms
- Location of Ribemont
- Location within France Location within Hauts-de-France
- Coordinates: 49°47′47″N 3°27′33″E
- Country: France
- Region: Hauts-de-France
- Department: Aisne
- Arrondissement: Saint-Quentin
- Canton: Ribemont
- Intercommunality: Val de l'Oise

Government
  - Mayor (2026–32): Vincent Cool
- Area^{1}: 26.91 km^{2} (10.39 sq mi)
- Elevation: 67 m (220 ft)
- Highest elevation: 141 m (463 ft)
- Lowest elevation: 62 m (203 ft)
- Population (2023): 1,931
  - Density: 71.76/km^{2} (185.9/sq mi)
- Time zone: UTC+01:00 (CET)
  - Summer (DST): UTC+02:00 (CEST)
- INSEE/Postal code: 02648 /02240
- ^{1} French Land Register data, which excludes lakes, ponds, glaciers > 1 km^{2} (0.386 sq mi or 247 acres) and river estuaries.

Ribemont (French pronunciation: [ʁibmɔ̃]) is a commune in the Aisne department in Hauts-de-France in northern France. It is the birthplace of Marquis de Condorcet (1743-1794), figure of the French Revolution

== History ==
Two treaties were signed in Ribemont:

- The Treaty of Ribemont in 880 was the last treaty on the partitions of the Frankish Empire. It was signed by the German king Louis the Younger and the kings of Western Francia, Louis III and Carloman.
- The Treaty of Ribemont in 1179 was signed on 2 May 1179 by the two eldest sons of the late Duke Matthias I of Lorraine.

Anselm of Ribemont founded here the Benedictine abbey of Saint Nicolas in the late 11th century.

== Population ==
Historical population
Year	Pop.	±% p.a.
1968	2,152	—
1975	2,014	−0.94%
1982	2,105	+0.63%
1990	2,227	+0.71%
1999	2,096	−0.67%
2007	2,042	−0.33%
2012	1,966	−0.76%
2017	1,982	+0.16%
2023	1,931	−0.43%
Source: INSEE

== See also ==
- Communes of the Aisne department
- List of medieval bridges in France
