= Vahl-lès-Faulquemont =

- Commune
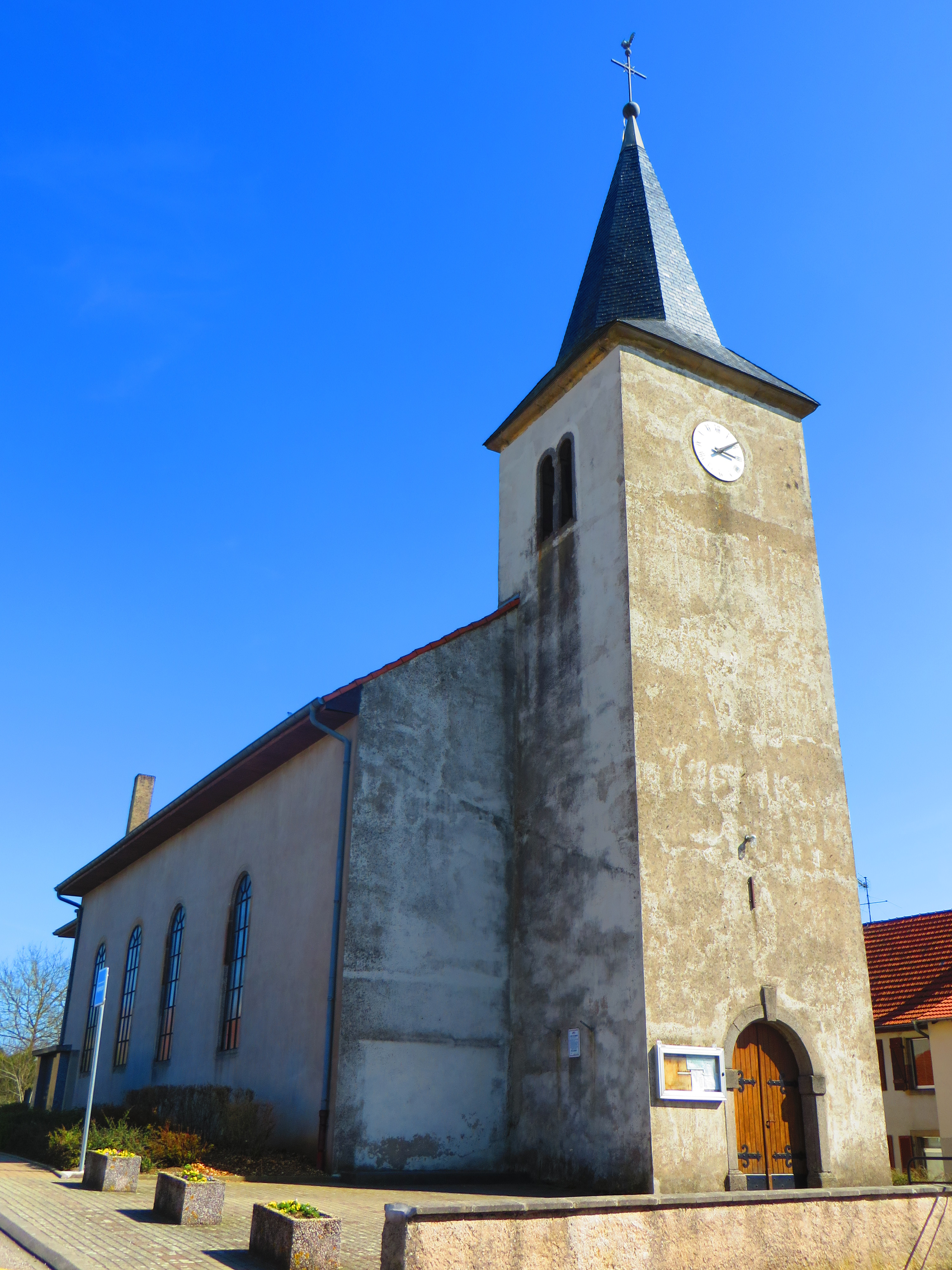
- The church in Vahl-lès-Faulquemont

- Coat of arms
- Location of Vahl-lès-Faulquemont
- Location within France Location within Grand Est
- Coordinates: 49°01′38″N 6°37′33″E
- Country: France
- Region: Grand Est
- Department: Moselle
- Arrondissement: Forbach-Boulay-Moselle
- Canton: Faulquemont
- Intercommunality: CC du District Urbain de Faulquemont

Government
  - Mayor (2020–2026): Pierre Thill
- Area^{1}: 6.18 km^{2} (2.39 sq mi)
- Elevation: 220 m (720 ft)
- Highest elevation: 296 m (971 ft)
- Lowest elevation: 245 m (804 ft)
- Population (2023): 244
  - Density: 39.5/km^{2} (102/sq mi)
- Time zone: UTC+01:00 (CET)
  - Summer (DST): UTC+02:00 (CEST)
- INSEE/Postal code: 57686 /57380
- ^{1} French Land Register data, which excludes lakes, ponds, glaciers > 1 km^{2} (0.386 sq mi or 247 acres) and river estuaries.

Vahl-lès-Faulquemont (French pronunciation: [val lɛ folkəmɔ̃], literally Vahl near Faulquemont; German: Wahlen) is a commune in the Moselle department in Grand Est in north-eastern France.

== See also ==
- Communes of the Moselle department
