= Westrich =

Westrich may refer to:

- The Westrich, historical region in southwestern Germany and northeastern France
- Cherielynn Westrich an American politician and musician
- Paul Westrich, a German entomologist, see de:Paul Westrich
