= Schwindratzheim =

- Commune
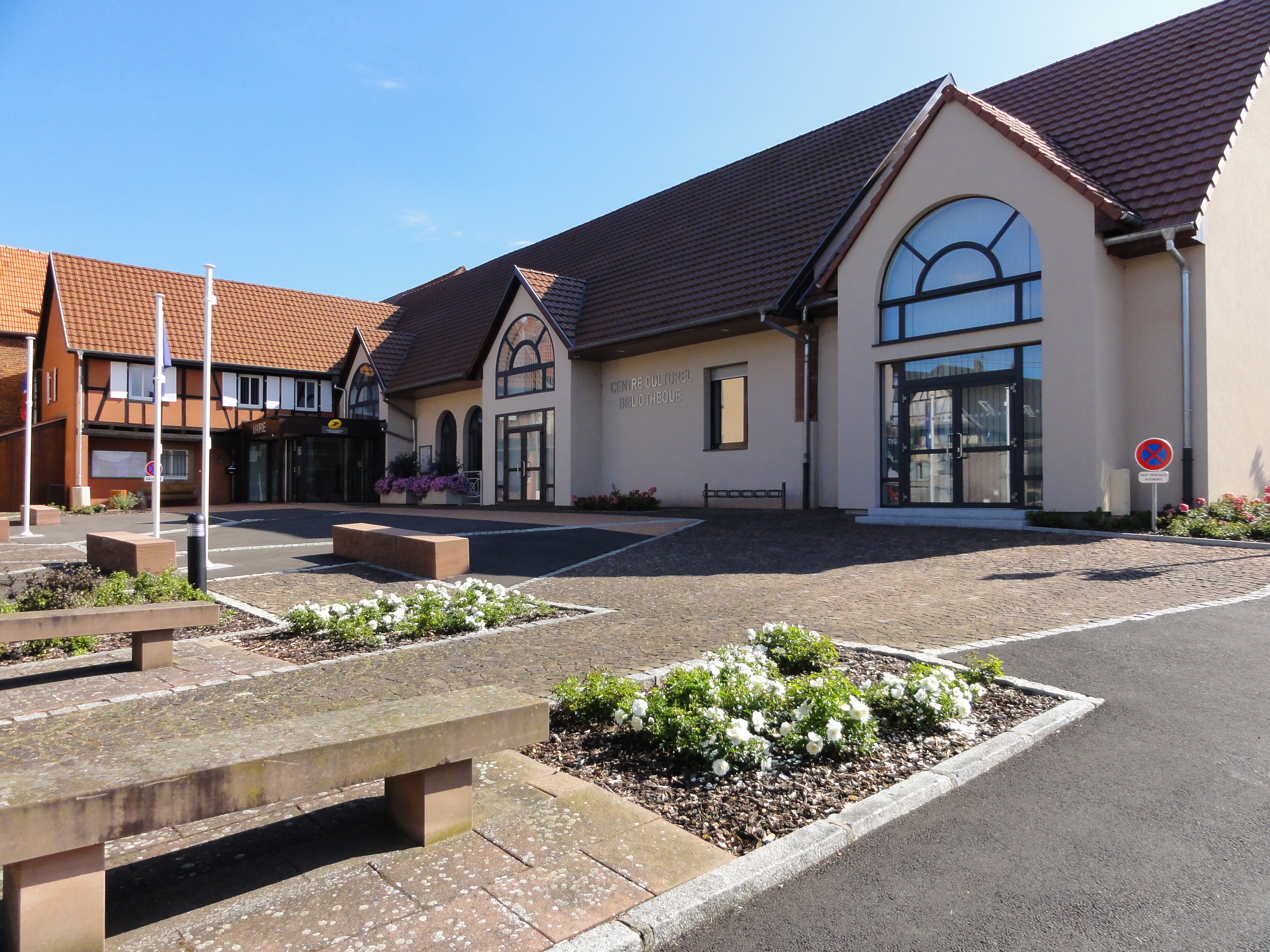
- The town hall in Schwindratzheim

- Coat of arms
- Location of Schwindratzheim
- Location within France Location within Grand Est
- Coordinates: 48°45′27″N 7°36′09″E
- Country: France
- Region: Grand Est
- Department: Bas-Rhin
- Arrondissement: Saverne
- Canton: Bouxwiller

Government
  - Mayor (2020–2026): Xavier Ulrich
- Area^{1}: 9.14 km^{2} (3.53 sq mi)
- Highest elevation: 245 m (804 ft)
- Lowest elevation: 151 m (495 ft)
- Population (2023): 1,768
  - Density: 193/km^{2} (501/sq mi)
- Time zone: UTC+01:00 (CET)
  - Summer (DST): UTC+02:00 (CEST)
- INSEE/Postal code: 67460 /67270
- ^{1} French Land Register data, which excludes lakes, ponds, glaciers > 1 km^{2} (0.386 sq mi or 247 acres) and river estuaries.

Schwindratzheim (French pronunciation: [ʃvindratsaim]; Alsatian: Schwìngelse) is a commune in the Bas-Rhin department in Grand Est in north-eastern France.

== See also ==
- Communes of the Bas-Rhin department
