= Camp du Ban-Saint-Jean =

Former military camp in France

Coordinates: 49.17503°N 6.554383°E

Camp du Ban-Saint-Jean is a former military camp near Boulay-Moselle in France. Totally abandoned today, it was used during World War II as a stalag (German POW camp).

During the Cold War, Boulay and Ban-Saint-Jean were the site of one of two NATO secret bases named "Big Ears", dedicated to listening to radio communications from the East. Giant sophisticated antennas and the most modern radio communications systems were operated under the protection of the French Army's 718th company of transmissions.

Hundreds of trained specialists scrutinised the radio signals to detect military manoeuvres from the East, triggering alerts as soon as any alarming message was detected and deciphered. The network was connected by equipment called "Dispatchers" to a radio-goniometry network of antennas located on the German side of the nearby border. The Ban-Saint-Jean camp was a perfect hideout; it lodged teams of specialists out of sight of normal life and away from contact with others in comfortable large houses. Its motto was: "Speed, preparedness and discretion".

This vital alert center, which had a direct link to the highest authorities in the Western world, was dismantled in the 1980's with the arrival of new technologies. Few remember its history as an important Cold War site.
