= A355 autoroute =

Road in France

A355 autoroute
- Grand Western Bypass of Strasbourg
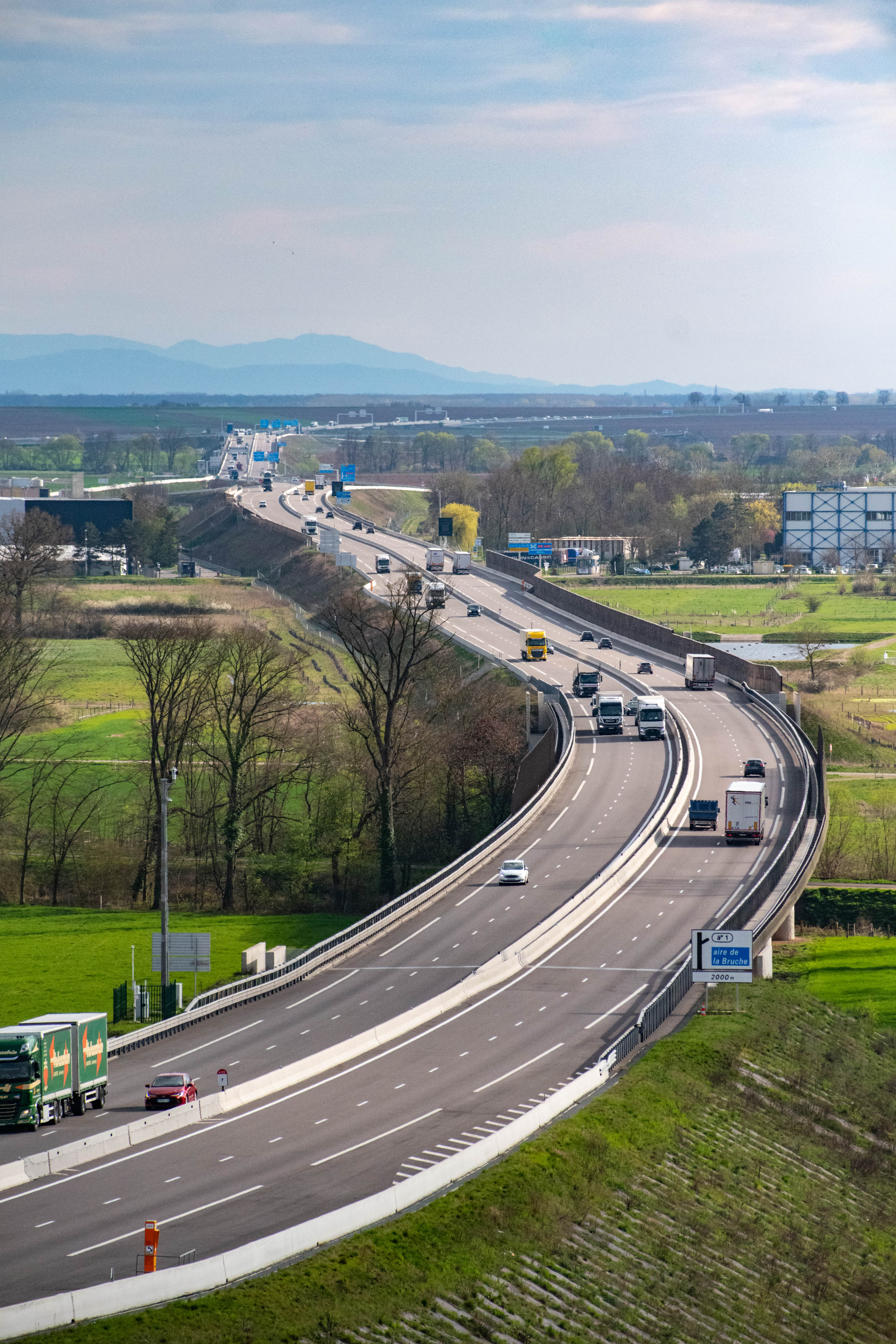
- The A355 motorway in Kolbsheim

Route information
- Length: 24 km (15 mi)
- Existed: December 17, 2021–present

Major junctions
- South end: A 35 and A 352 to Duttlenheim

- D 1004 to Ittenheim

- North end: A 4 and A 35 to Vendenheim

Location
- Country: France
- Regions: Grand Est
- Departments: Bas-Rhin (Collectivité européenne d'Alsace)
- Major cities: Strasbourg

Highway system
- Roads in France; Autoroutes; Routes nationales

The A355 autoroute, known as the "grand western bypass" or "western bypass of Strasbourg" (GCO), is a motorway that bypasses Strasbourg from the west through the Kochersberg. With a length of 24 km, it connects the junction between the A4 and A35 motorways to the north of Strasbourg to the junction between the A35 and the A352 to the south.
