= Dormans =

- Commune
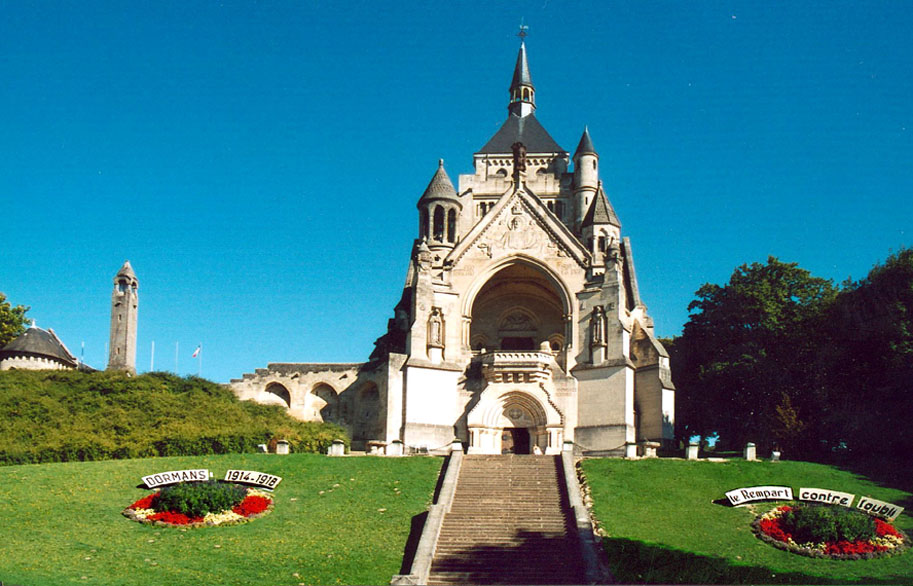
- Memorial chapel to the Battles of the Marne, in Dormans

- Coat of arms
- Location of Dormans
- Location within France Location within Grand Est
- Coordinates: 49°04′38″N 3°38′25″E
- Country: France
- Region: Grand Est
- Department: Marne
- Arrondissement: Épernay
- Canton: Dormans-Paysages de Champagne
- Intercommunality: Paysages de la Champagne

Government
  - Mayor (2020–2026): Michel Courteaux
- Area^{1}: 22.58 km^{2} (8.72 sq mi)
- Highest elevation: 250 m (820 ft)
- Lowest elevation: 62 m (203 ft)
- Population (2023): 2,890
  - Density: 128/km^{2} (331/sq mi)
- Time zone: UTC+01:00 (CET)
  - Summer (DST): UTC+02:00 (CEST)
- INSEE/Postal code: 51217 /51700
- ^{1} French Land Register data, which excludes lakes, ponds, glaciers > 1 km^{2} (0.386 sq mi or 247 acres) and river estuaries.

Dormans (French pronunciation: [dɔʁmɑ̃]) is a commune located in the Marne department and in the Grand Est region of France.

== Geography ==
Dormans is located in the valley of the Marne, at the border between the departments of the Marne and the Aisne, some 40 km from Reims and 25 km from Chateau-Thierry. The RN 3 goes through Dormans and leads to the autoroute A4. Dormans has a train station on the Paris–Strasbourg railway that sees multiple SNCF trains daily.

Dormans is at the heart of the Champagne vineyards.

=== Villages under jurisdiction of Dormans ===
The commune of Dormans regroups several small villages: Champaillet, Chavenay, Soilly, Try, Sainte-Croix, Vassieux and Vassy.

Soilly used to be its own commune but was integrated to Dormans in 1969.

== Politics and administration ==
The commune is located in the arrondissement of Épernay, in the department of the Marne.

Dormans is twinned with Dorsten, Germany, since 1981.

== Population ==
Historical population
Year	Pop.	±% p.a.
1968	2,638	—
1975	2,950	+1.61%
1982	2,920	−0.15%
1990	3,125	+0.85%
1999	3,126	+0.00%
2007	2,979	−0.60%
2012	2,855	−0.85%
2017	2,921	+0.46%
2023	2,890	−0.18%
Source: INSEE

== Gallery ==
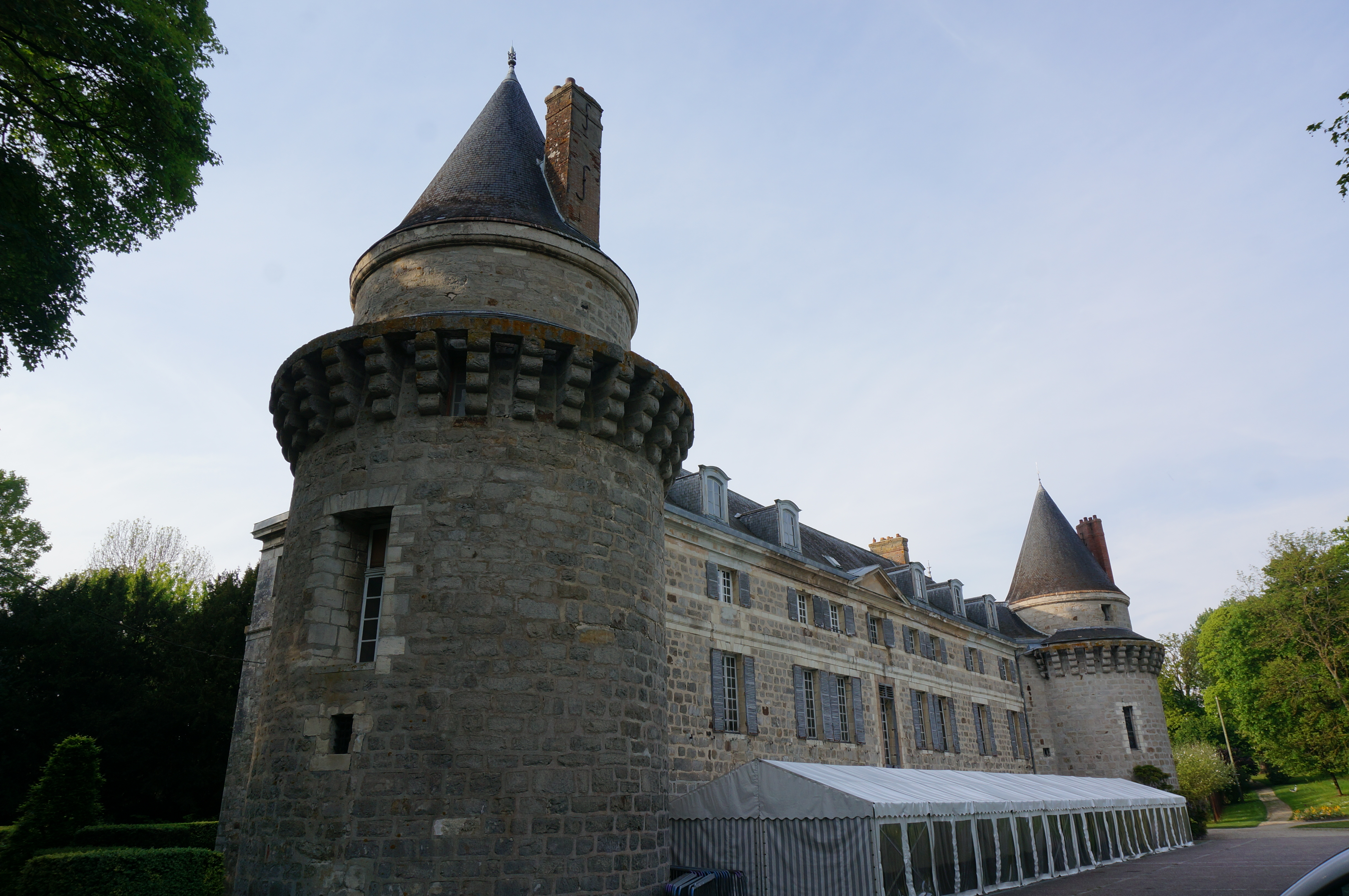
castle

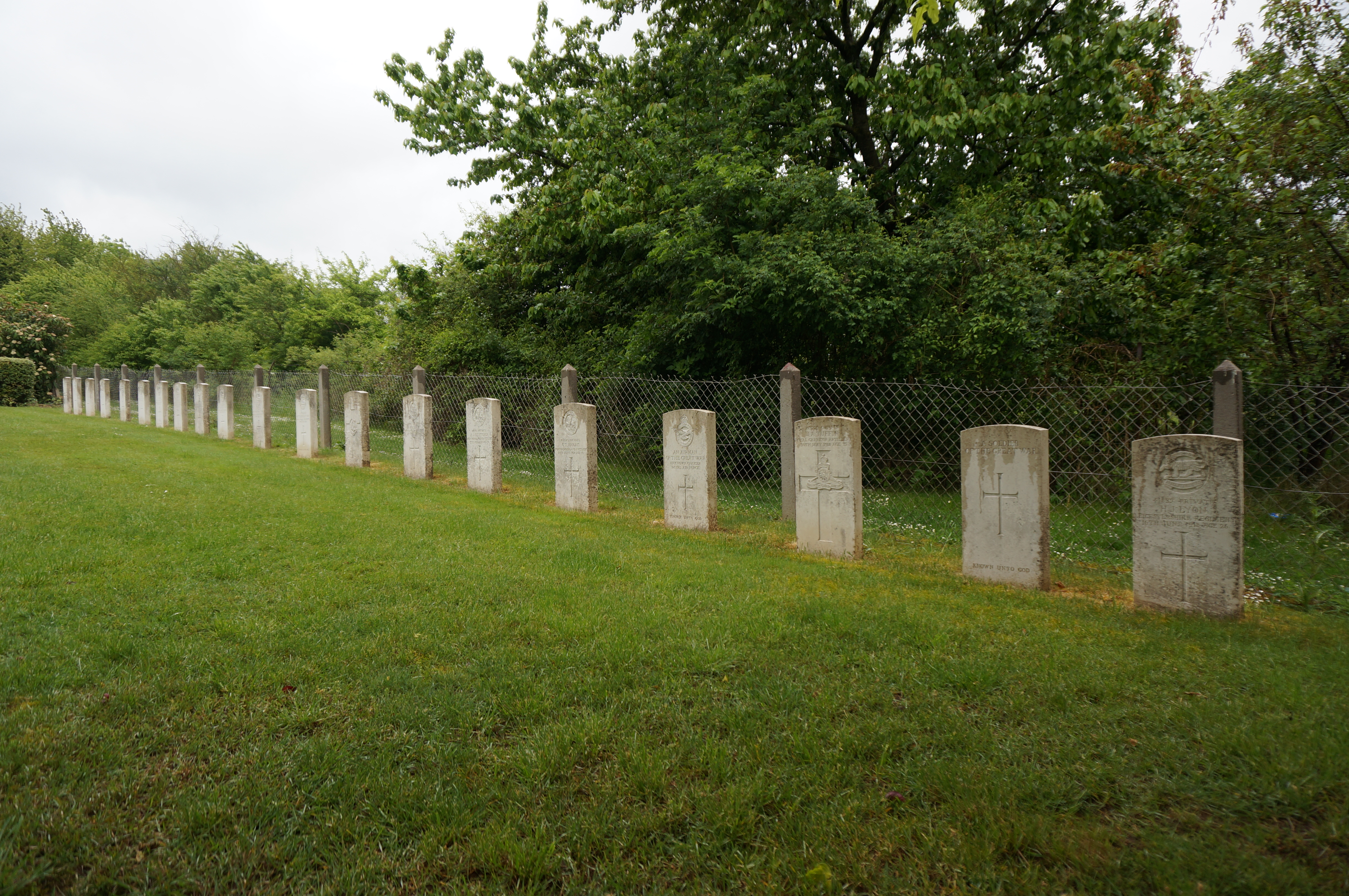
World War I cemetery

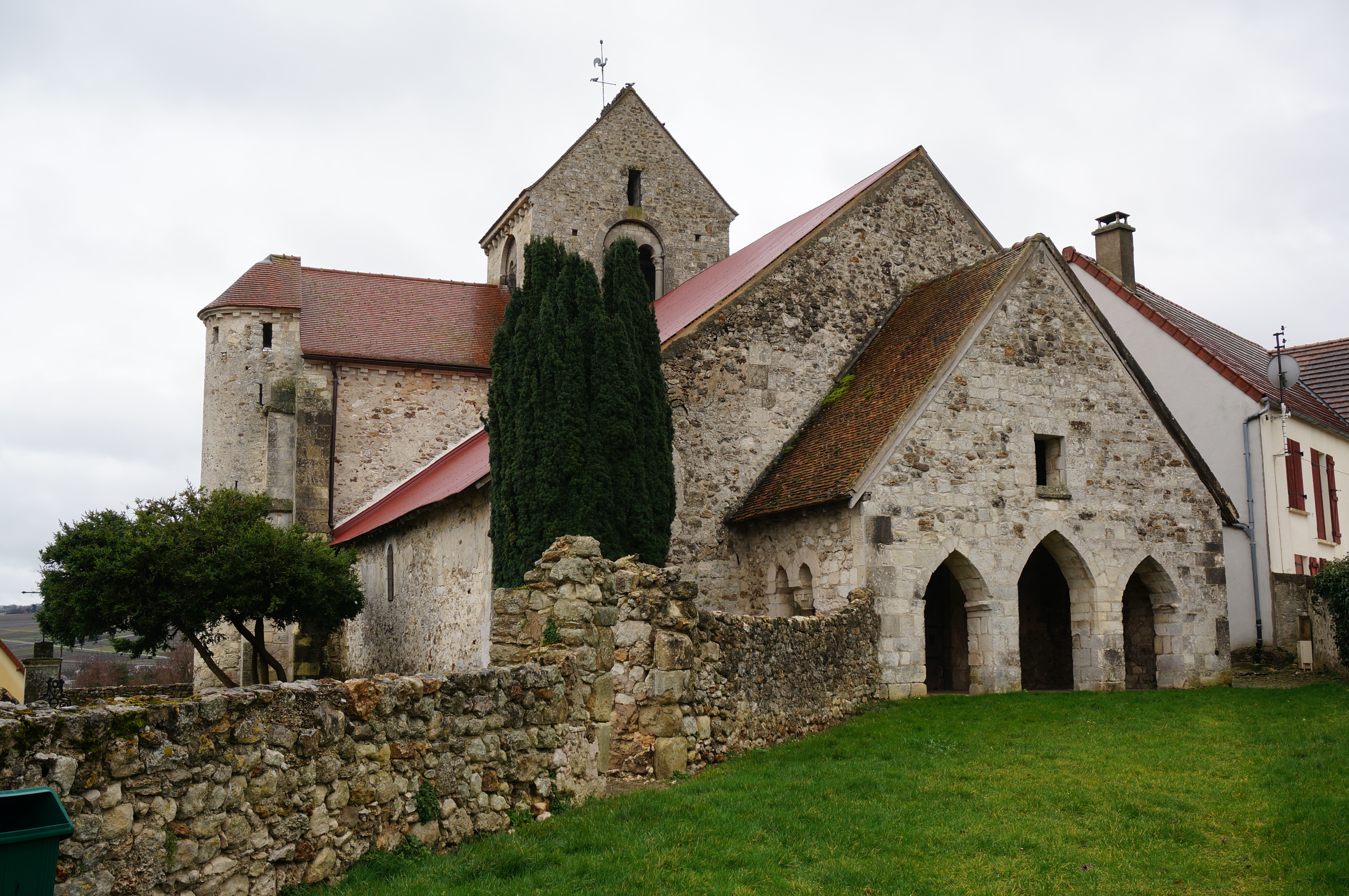
churches

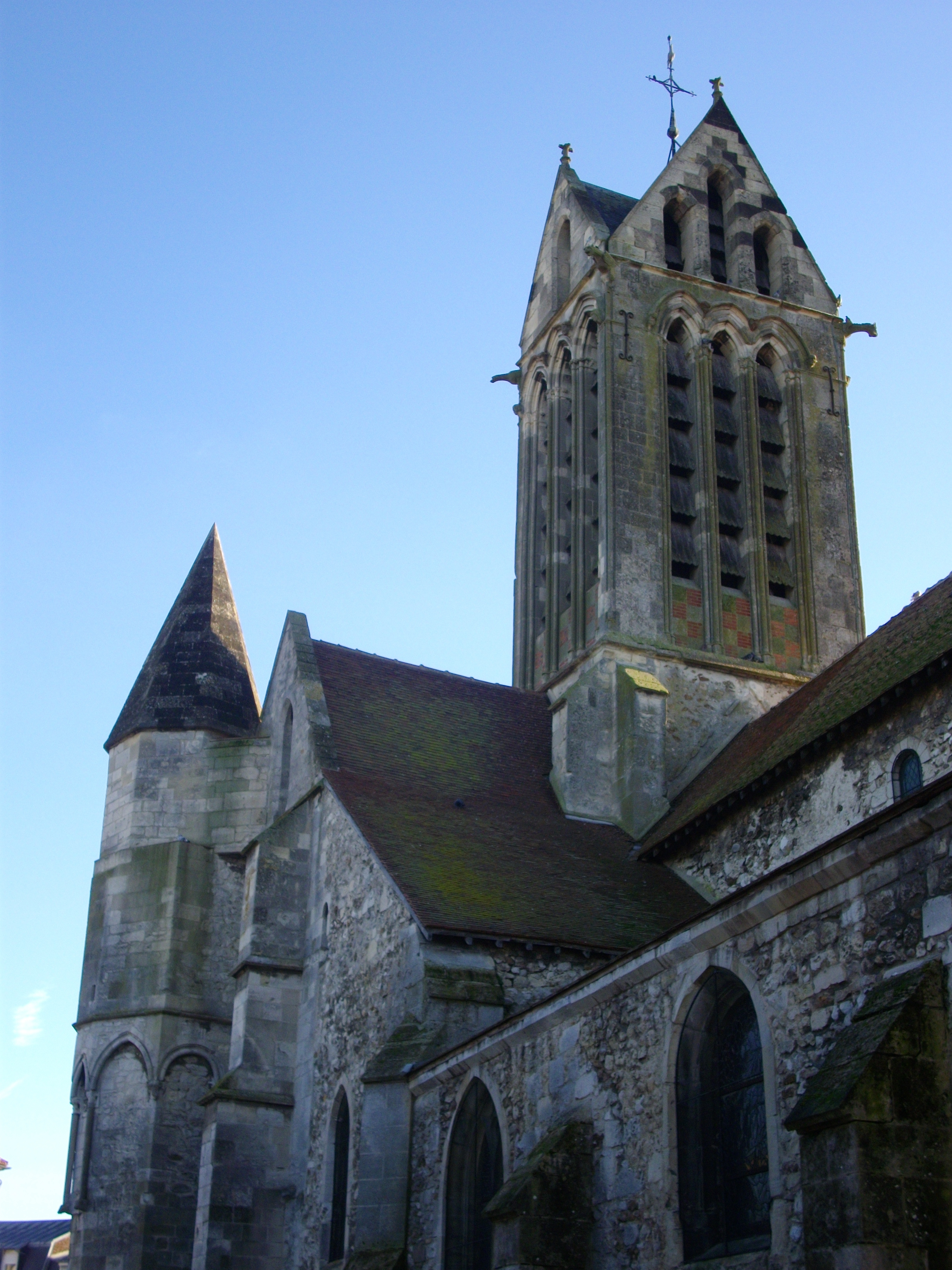

== See also ==
- Communes of the Marne department
