= Simon II of Lorraine =

Duke of Lorraine from 1176 to 1205

Simon II
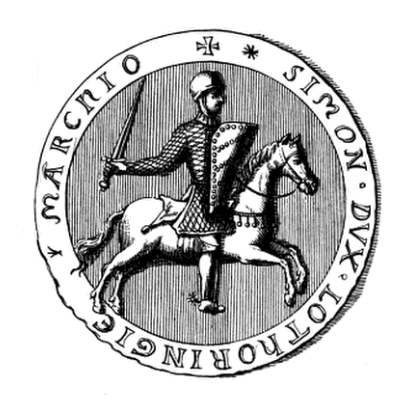
- + SIMON DUX LOTHORINGI ET MARCHIO

Duke of Lorraine
- Reign: 1176 - 1205
- Predecessor: Matthias I
- Successor: Frederick I
- Born: 1140
- Died: 4 January 1207 (aged 66–67)
- Spouse: Ida of Mâcon
- House: House of Lorraine
- Father: Matthias I, Duke of Lorraine
- Mother: Bertha of Swabia

Simon II (1140 – 4 January 1207) was the Duke of Lorraine from 1176 to 1205. He was the son and successor of Matthias I and Bertha (also called Judith), daughter of Frederick II, Duke of Swabia.

His mother wished for her second son, Frederick, to succeed and so Simon was forced to convene an assembly of the nobles to confirm his succession. He was in turn forced to recognise certain feudal privileges and create the Estates of Lorraine, a form of parliament. He also gave Bitche as an appanage to Frederick who was not satisfied and revolted against Simon. The war lasted three years until the Treaty of Ribemont, whereby Simon retained the southern, francophone, half of the duchy and Frederick took the northern, germanophone, portion.

He married Ida (died 1227), daughter of Gerard I, count of Mâcon and Vienne, and Maurette of Salins. They had no children. He designated his nephew, Frederick, son of Frederick, as his successor and ceded, in 1202, the suzerainty over the county of Vaudémont to Count Theobald I of Bar. Simon abdicated and retired to a monastery in 1205. He died two years later. He had no descendants and was succeeded by his brother.

== See also ==
- House of Lorraine

Preceded by Matthias I	Duke of Lorraine; 1176–1205	Succeeded by Frederick I
