= Bertha, Duchess of Lorraine =

Duchess of Lorraine (1123–1195)

Bertha of Lorraine (or Bertha of Swabia) (b.c. 1123/30 – d. 1194/5) was duchess of Lorraine (c.1138-1176) by marriage to Matthias I duke of Lorraine. She had a contested regency in the beginning of her son's rule, but was deposed from her position because her son was an adult.

== Life ==
Bertha (sometimes called Judith) was the daughter of Frederick II, Duke of Swabia and Judith of Bavaria (1103- 22 February 1131), daughter of Henry IX, Duke of Bavaria. Through her father, Bertha was a member of the Hohenstaufen dynasty: her paternal uncle was king Conrad III and her brother was the future emperor Frederick Barbarossa.

Bertha married Matthias of Lorraine c.1138. Bertha frequently issued charters alongside her husband. She used at least two different types of seal to authenticate her documents, on which she was riding astride on horseback, which was a highly unusual image for a medieval noblewoman to use.

After the death of Matthias in 1176, he was succeeded by his son with Bertha, Simon, as duke of Lorraine. Due to the weak health of her son, Bertha took power as regent and issued documents which she co-signed with her son. Because her son was an adult, her regency was considered illegal and widely opposed by the nobility, and resulted in her excommunication. She was forced to resign from her political position and perform penitence before the Bishop of Metz.

== Marriage and issue ==
With Matthias I, Bertha had several children, including:

- Simon (died 1205), his successor in Lorraine
- Frederick (died 1206), count of Bitche and his nephew's successor
- Judith (died 1173), married Stephen II of Auxonne (1170)
- Alice (died 1200), married Hugh III, Duke of Burgundy
- Theoderic (died 1181), bishop of Metz (1174–1179)
- Matthias (died 1208), count of Toul
- Unnamed daughter who died young

== Sources ==
- C. Brooke, Europe in the Central Middle Ages (Routledge, 2014).
- J. Jasperse, ‘To Have and to Hold: Coins and Seals as Evidence for Motherly Authority,' In C. Fleiner and E. Woodacre, (eds): Royal Mothers and Their Ruling Children. Wielding Political Authority from Antiquity to the Early Modern Era (Basingstoke, Palgrave Macmillan, 2015), pp. 83–104.
- J. Jasperse, ‘Manly Minds in Female Bodies: Three Women and their Power through Coins and Seals’, Arenal: Revista de historia de las mujeres 25:2 (2018), 295-321.
- G. Poull, La maison ducale de Lorraine devenue la maison impériale et royale d’Autriche, de Hongrie et de Bohême (Nancy, Presses universitaires de Nancy, 1991).
- Jacqueline Carolus-Curien Pauvres duchesses, l'envers du décor à la cour de Lorraine. Éditions Serpenoise, Metz, 2007. (ISBN 978-2-87692-715-5).
