= Boulay-Moselle =

Boulay-Moselle Bolchin (Moselle Franconian)
- Commune
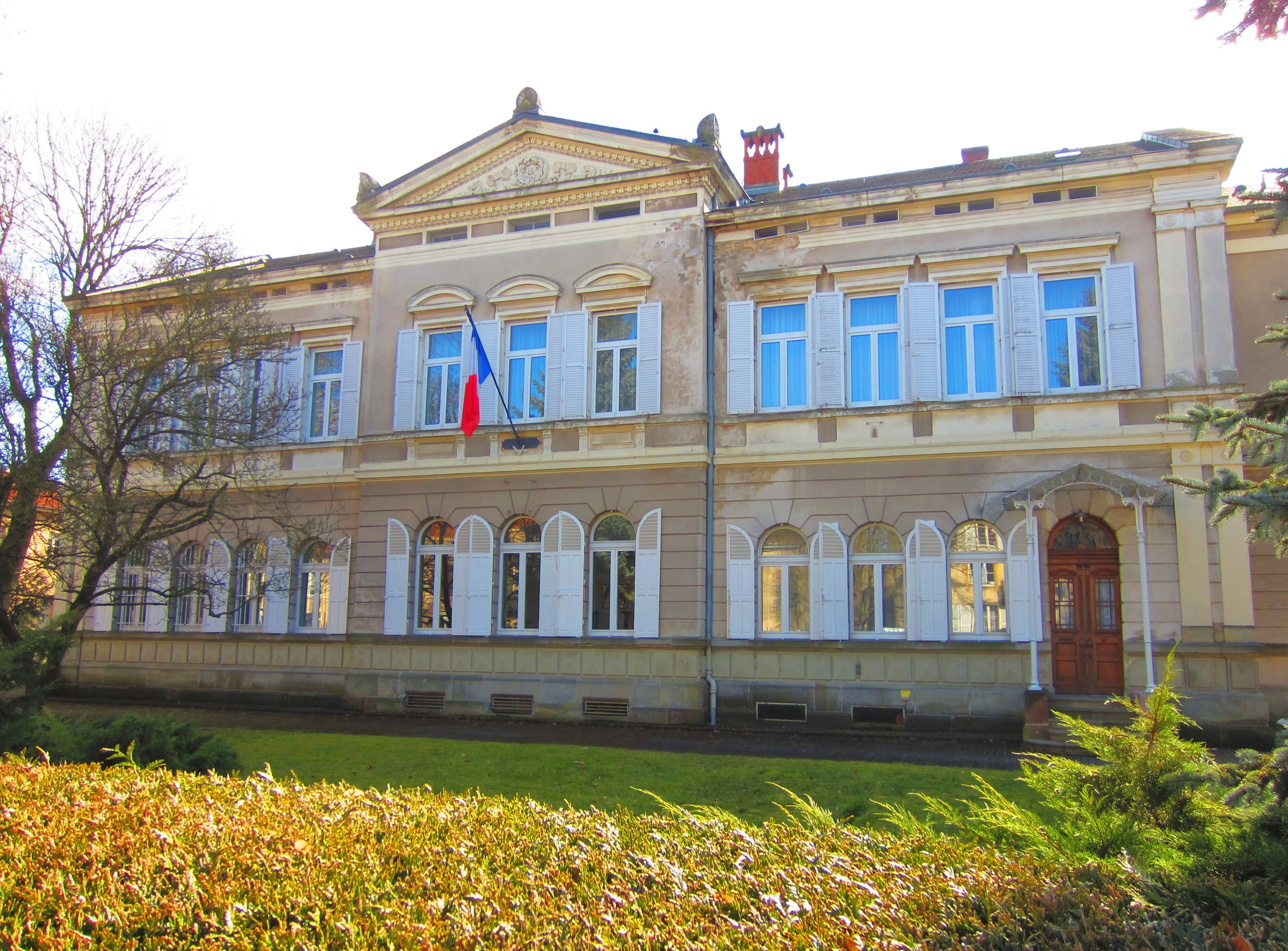
- The subprefecture in Boulay-Moselle

- Coat of arms
- Location of Boulay-Moselle
- Location within France Location within Grand Est
- Coordinates: 49°11′03″N 6°29′39″E
- Country: France
- Region: Grand Est
- Department: Moselle
- Arrondissement: Forbach-Boulay-Moselle
- Canton: Boulay-Moselle
- Intercommunality: Houve-Pays Boulageois

Government
  - Mayor (2021–2026): Philippe Schutz
- Area^{1}: 19.55 km^{2} (7.55 sq mi)
- Population (2023): 5,434
  - Density: 278.0/km^{2} (719.9/sq mi)
- Time zone: UTC+01:00 (CET)
  - Summer (DST): UTC+02:00 (CEST)
- INSEE/Postal code: 57097 /57220
- ^{1} French Land Register data, which excludes lakes, ponds, glaciers > 1 km^{2} (0.386 sq mi or 247 acres) and river estuaries.

Boulay-Moselle (French pronunciation: [bulɛ mɔzel]; German: Bolchen, Moselle Franconian: Bolchin) is a commune in the Moselle department in Grand Est in northeastern France. The former commune of Halling-lès-Boulay (German: Hallingen) was incorporated in the commune in January 1973. Until 2015, Boulay-Moselle was a subprefecture of the Moselle department.

== Population ==
The population data in the table below refer to the commune of Boulay-Moselle proper, in its geography at the given years.

Historical population

Year	Pop.	±% p.a.
1793	2,785	—
1800	2,069	−4.16%
1806	2,272	+1.57%
1821	2,571	+0.83%
1836	2,684	+0.29%
1841	2,670	−0.10%
1861	2,968	+0.53%
1866	2,870	−0.67%
1871	2,499	−2.73%
1875	2,520	+0.21%
1880	2,668	+1.15%
1885	2,372	−2.32%
1890	2,281	−0.78%
1895	2,133	−1.33%
1900	2,737	+5.11%
1905	2,202	−4.26%
1910	2,218	+0.14%

Year	Pop.	±% p.a.
1921	2,009	−0.90%
1926	2,150	+1.37%
1931	2,364	+1.92%
1936	2,611	+2.01%
1946	2,216	−1.63%
1954	2,627	+2.15%
1962	2,985	+1.61%
1968	3,314	+1.76%
1975	3,830	+2.09%
1982	4,336	+1.79%
1990	4,422	+0.25%
1999	4,374	−0.12%
2007	4,711	+0.93%
2012	5,377	+2.68%
2017	5,587	+0.77%
2023	5,434	−0.46%

Source: EHESS and INSEE (1968–2023)

== See also ==
- Camp du Ban-Saint-Jean
- Communes of the Moselle department
