= Frederick I of Lorraine =

Duke of Lorraine from 1205 to 1206

Frederick I
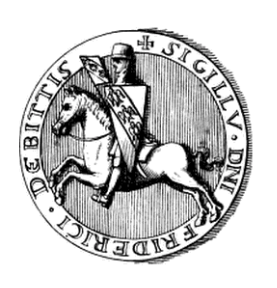
- The seal of Frederick of Bitche (Latin: + SIGILLU[M] D[OMI]NI FRIDERICI DE BITTIS)

Duke of Lorraine
- Reign: 1205–1206
- Predecessor: Simon II
- Successor: Frederick II
- Born: c. 1143
- Died: 7 April 1206
- Spouse: Wierzchoslawa Ludmilla of Greater Poland
- Issue: Frederick II, Duke of Lorraine
- House: House of Lorraine
- Father: Matthias I, Duke of Lorraine
- Mother: Bertha of Swabia

Frederick I (German: Friedrich I.; Latin: Fridericus; French: Ferry or Ferri; c. 1143 – 7 April 1206) was the duke of Lorraine from 1205 to his death. He was the second son of Matthias I and Bertha (also called Judith), daughter of Frederick II, Duke of Swabia. He succeeded his brother, Simon II, who had already given him the county of Bitche in 1176 and had recognised him over the northern, germanophone half of Lorraine by the Treaty of Ribemont of 1179. Judith had wanted him to succeed to all their father's inheritance, but a three-year civil war only secured him Bitche and a half-portion.

Simon retired to a monastery in 1205, recognising Frederick's son Frederick as heir. Frederick inherited it all nevertheless, but died a year later and it went to his son by Wierzchoslawa Ludmilla (1150–1223), daughter of Mieszko III the Old, duke of Greater Poland and high duke of all Poland. Their children were:

- Frederick, his successor in Lorraine
- Thierry the Devil (le Diable), lord of Autigny, married Gertrude de Montmorency, daughter of Mathieu II le Grand, Constable of France.
- Henry the Lombard, who built the castle of Bayon
- Philip (died 1243), lord of Gerbéviller
- Matthias (1170–1217), bishop of Toul
- Agatha (died 1242), abbess of Remiremont
- Judith, married Henry II, Count of Salm
- Hediwge (died 1228), married Henry I, Count of Zweibrücken
- Cunigunda (died 1214), married Waleran III of Limburg

Preceded by Simon II	Duke of Lorraine; 1205–1206	Succeeded by Frederick II
