= Frederick II of Swabia =

Hohenstaufen Duke of Swabia (1090–1147)

Frederick II the One-Eyed
- Duke of Swabia
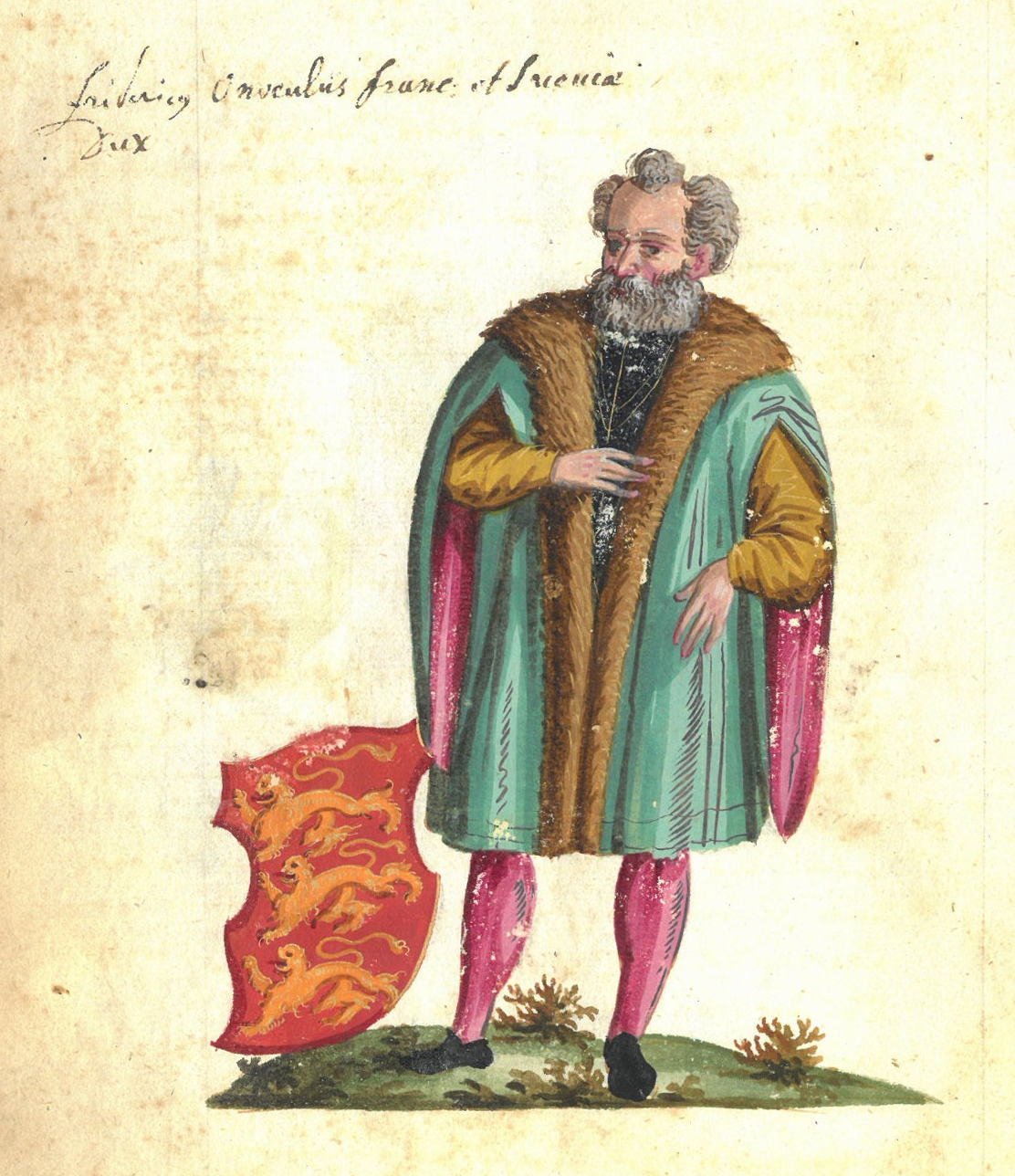
- Frederick II with his coat of arms, illustration of Rauchbeinchronik manuscript, created c. 1600
- Reign: 1105 - 6 April 1147
- Predecessor: Frederick I, Duke of Swabia
- Successor: Frederick III, Duke of Swabia
- Born: 1090
- Died: 6 April 1147; Alzey, Rhenish Franconia
- Buried: Walburg Abbey
- Noble family: Hohenstaufen
- Spouses: Agnes of Saarbrücken; Judith of Bavaria
- Issue: Frederick I, Holy Roman Emperor; Bertha of Lorraine; Judith of Hohenstaufen; Conrad of Hohenstaufen; Dietrich (illegitimate)
- Father: Frederick I, Duke of Swabia
- Mother: Agnes of Germany

Frederick II (German: Friedrich II, 1090 – 6 April 1147), called the One-Eyed (der Einäugige), was Duke of Swabia from 1105 until his death, the second from the Hohenstaufen dynasty. His younger brother Conrad was elected King of the Romans in 1138.

== Life ==
=== Early conflicts and marriage ===
Frederick II was the eldest son of Duke Frederick I of Swabia and his wife Agnes of Waiblingen, a daughter of the Salian emperor Henry IV. He succeeded his father in 1105 and together with his brother Conrad continued the extension and consolidation of the Hohenstaufen estates. Frederick had numerous castles erected along the Rhine river and in the Alsace region.

Frederick accompanied King Henry V on his campaign against King Coloman of Hungary in 1108. In 1110, he and Henry V embarked on an expedition to Italy, where in Rome Henry enforced his coronation by Pope Paschal II. In turn, the emperor appointed Conrad Duke of Franconia and both brothers German regents when he left for his second Italian campaign in 1116, who put down a revolt by Archbishop Adalbert of Mainz.

About 1120 Frederick married Judith, a daughter of Duke Henry IX of Bavaria and member of the powerful House of Welf. Their first son Frederick was born in 1122.

=== Salian war of succession ===
Upon the death of Emperor Henry V in 1125, the Salian dynasty became extinct. Frederick II, Henry's nephew, stood for election as King of the Romans with the support of his younger brother Conrad and several princely houses. However, he lost in the tumultuous round of elections, led by Archbishop Adalbert of Mainz, to the Saxon duke Lothair II. Frederick at first rendered homage to the new king, however, he refused the feudal oath and insisted on the inheritance of the Salian family estates along the Middle Rhine.

At the 1125 Hoftag diet in Regensburg, the king officially requested the surrender of the Salian possessions. After he imposed an Imperial ban on the Hohenstaufens, a conflict erupted between Frederick and his supporters, and Lothair: encouraged by Archbishop Adalbert and several princes, the king occupied Hohenstaufen lands in Upper Lorraine and Alsace. However, an attack by Welf forces on the Swabian core territory failed, like the siege of Nuremberg by Lothair in 1127. Frederick relieved the siege and moreover gained the support from his brother Conrad, who had just returned from a pilgrimage to the Holy Land. During the fighting, Frederick lost an eye, whereafter he was no longer eligible as German king.

In December 1127 Conrad declared himself King of the Romans, while the next year Duke Frederick II occupied the Salian city of Speyer. The attempt of Duke Henry X of Bavaria to capture his brother-in-law Frederick during the negotiations failed. However, afterwards the supporters of Lothair won a number of victories both in Germany and in Italy. Speyer (1129), Nuremberg (1130) and Ulm (1134) were captured; moreover Frederick's consort Judith of Bavaria died in 1130. His second wife, Agnes of Saarbrücken, was a niece of his old enemy Adalbert of Mainz; Frederick married her about 1132.

After Lothair was crowned emperor in 1133, Frederick saw himself stuck between the Saxon and Bavarian forces. He eventually submitted to him in the spring of 1135 at Bamberg. Both were finally reconciled and Emperor Lothair renounced further attacks against the Hohenstaufens.

=== Last years ===
After Lothair's death in 1137 and the following election of Conrad as King of the Romans, Frederick supported his brother in the struggle with the Welfs. According to Otto of Freising, Frederick was "so faithful a knight to his sovereign and so helpful a friend to his uncle that by valor he supported the tottering honor of the realm, fighting manfully against its foes..."

Duke Frederick II died in 1147 at Alzey. He was buried at the Benedictine abbey of Walburg in Alsace. His son Frederick succeeded him as Swabian duke and was elected German king (as Frederick Barbarossa) in 1152.

== Marriage and children ==
With Judith of Bavaria (1103- 22 February 1131), daughter of Henry IX, Duke of Bavaria:

- Frederick III Barbarossa (1122–1190), duke of Swabia and Holy Roman Emperor as Frederick I
- Bertha of Lorraine (1123–1195), married Matthias I, Duke of Lorraine

With Agnes of Saarbrücken (d. c. 1147), daughter of Frederick, Count of Saarbrücken:

- Conrad of Hohenstaufen (also spelled Konrad) (1134/1136-1195), Count Palatine of the Rhine
- Jutta (1135–1191), married Louis II, Landgrave of Thuringia

== See also ==
- Dukes of Swabia family tree

== Sources ==
- Brooke, Christopher (2014). Europe in the Central Middle Ages: 962-1154. Routledge.
- Freed, John B. (2016). Frederick Barbarossa: A Prince and the Myth. Yale University Press.
- Lyon, Jonathan R. (2013). Princely Brothers and Sisters. Cornell University Press.

Frederick II of Swabia House of Hohenstaufen Born: 1090 Died: 1147
Regnal titles
Preceded by Frederick I	Duke of Swabia; 1105–1147	Succeeded by Frederick Barbarossa
