= Walbourg =

- Commune
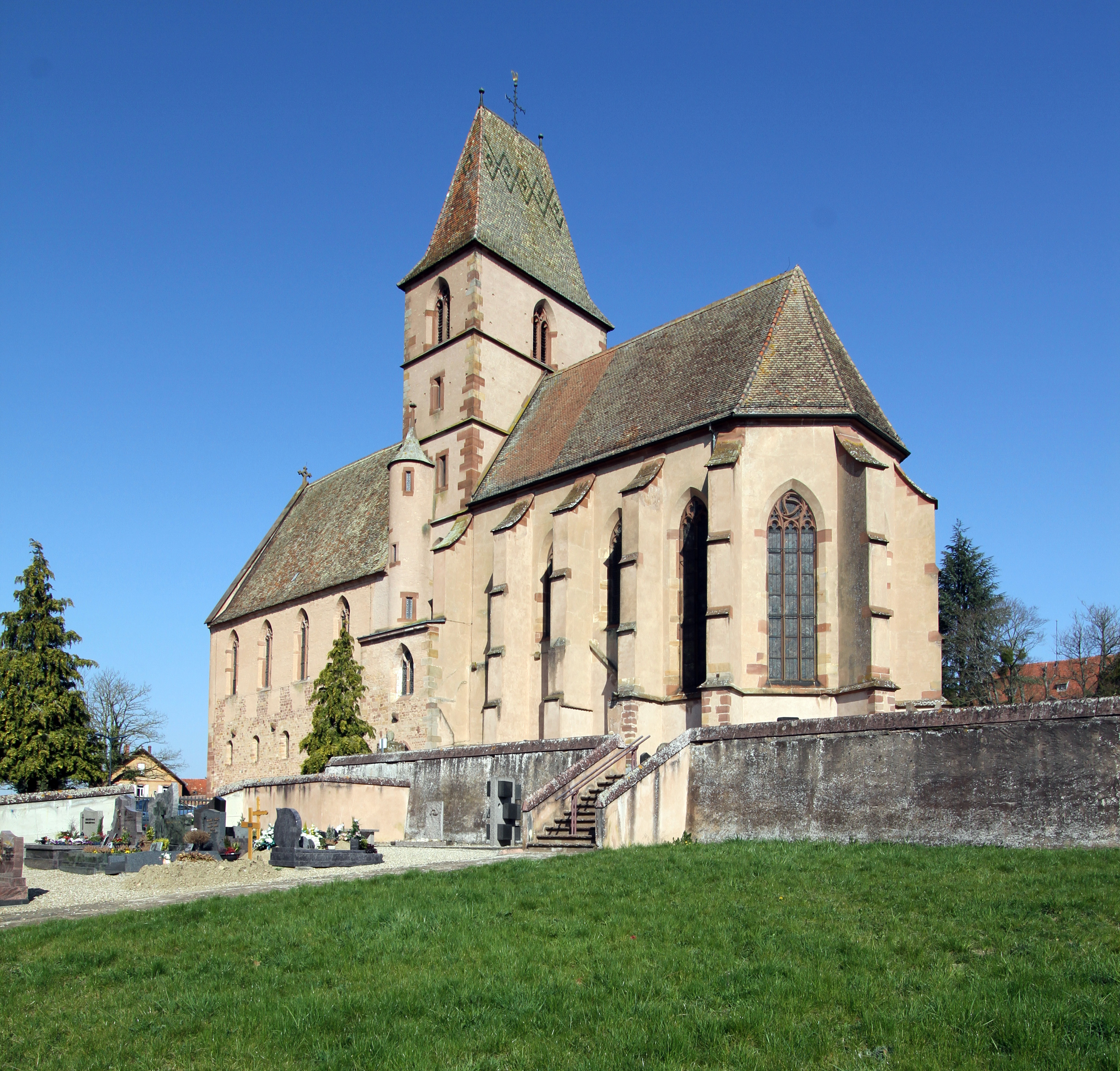
- Church of Saint Walburg in Walbourg

- Coat of arms
- Location of Walbourg
- Location within France Location within Grand Est
- Coordinates: 48°53′15″N 7°47′24″E
- Country: France
- Region: Grand Est
- Department: Bas-Rhin
- Arrondissement: Haguenau-Wissembourg
- Canton: Reichshoffen
- Intercommunality: Sauer-Pechelbronn

Government
  - Mayor (2020–2026): Francis Schneider
- Area^{1}: 5.33 km^{2} (2.06 sq mi)
- Elevation: 165 m (541 ft)
- Highest elevation: 177 m (581 ft)
- Lowest elevation: 146 m (479 ft)
- Population (2023): 928
  - Density: 174/km^{2} (451/sq mi)
- Time zone: UTC+01:00 (CET)
  - Summer (DST): UTC+02:00 (CEST)
- INSEE/Postal code: 67511 /67360
- ^{1} French Land Register data, which excludes lakes, ponds, glaciers > 1 km^{2} (0.386 sq mi or 247 acres) and river estuaries.

Walbourg (French pronunciation: [valbuʁ]; German: Walburg) is a commune in the Bas-Rhin department in Grand Est in north-eastern France.

== Population ==
Historical population
Year	Pop.	±% p.a.
1968	539	—
1975	561	+0.57%
1982	622	+1.49%
1990	707	+1.61%
1999	786	+1.18%
2007	792	+0.10%
2012	829	+0.92%
2017	917	+2.04%
2023	928	+0.20%
Source: INSEE

== See also ==
- Communes of the Bas-Rhin department
