= Treaty of Ribemont (1179) =

1179 treaty partitioning Lorraine

The Treaty of Ribemont was signed on 2 May 1179 by the two eldest sons of the late Duke Matthias I of Lorraine. Matthias had died in 1176, without having laid down plans for his succession, and his duchy was claimed by his eldest son, Simon, and his second son, Frederick. In 1178 civil war broke out between the brothers. Through the mediation of Count Philip of Flanders the next year, the brothers were able to reach an agreement at Ribemont to partition the duchy. Simon received the southern, French-speaking part of the duchy, and Frederick received the northern, German-speaking part plus Ormes and Gerbéviller. Frederick also pledged himself to be his brother's vassal, but he employed the title "Duke of Bitche", an expression of equal status.

In 1206 Simon abdicated and the duchy was reunited in the hands of his brother, as per the treaty of 1179.

== Sources ==
- Neumann, Ronald (1990). "Matthäus I.". Neue Deutsche Biographie. Vol. 16. pp. 392–93.
- Herrmann, Hans-Walter (2010). "Simon II.". Neue Deutsche Biographie. Vol. 24. pp. 427–28.
