= Frederick II of Lorraine =

Duke of Lorraine from 1206 to 1213

Frederick II (c. 1165 – c. 1213) was the Duke of Lorraine from 7 April 1206 until his death in 1213. He was the son of Frederick I, Duke of Lorraine and Wierzchoslawa Ludmilla of Greater Poland. He succeeded his father as Duke of Lorraine upon his father's death.

== Marriage and issue ==
Frederick married Agnes of Bar (or Thomassine, according to different genealogies) (d. 1226), daughter of Theobald I, Count of Bar. Their children were:

- Theobald I, Duke of Lorraine (b. c. 1191, d. 17 February 1220), his successor
- Matthias II, Duke of Lorraine (b. c. 1193, d. 9 February 1251), who succeeded Theobald I
- Jacques, Bishop of Metz
- Renaut, Count of Castres
- Lorette, who married Simon II.

== See also ==
- Dukes of Lorraine family tree

Preceded by Frederick I	Duke of Lorraine; 1206–1213	Succeeded by Theobald I
