= Faulquemont =

- Commune
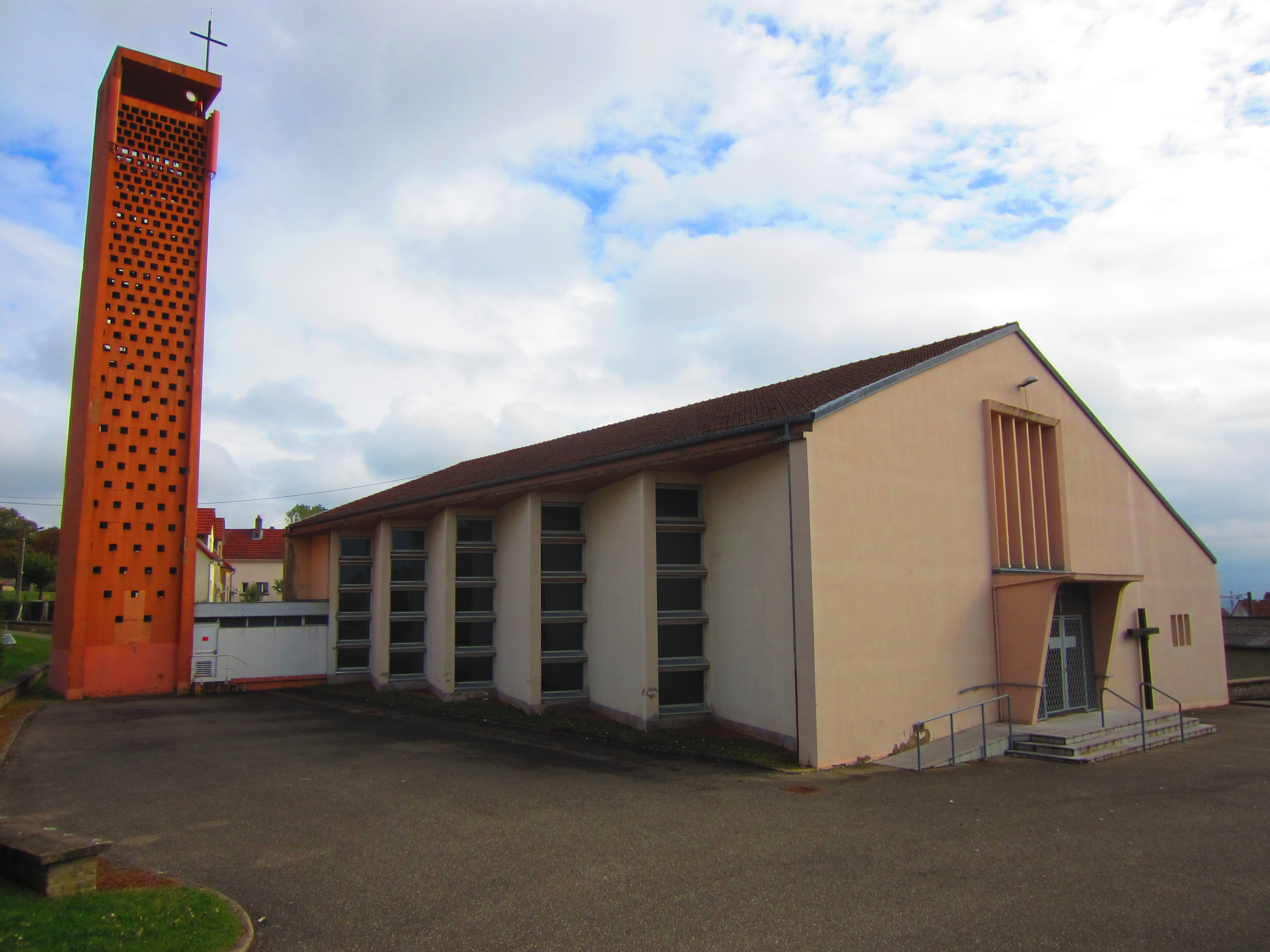
- The church in Faulquemont

- Coat of arms
- Location of Faulquemont
- Location within France Location within Grand Est
- Coordinates: 49°02′38″N 6°36′01″E
- Country: France
- Region: Grand Est
- Department: Moselle
- Arrondissement: Forbach-Boulay-Moselle
- Canton: Faulquemont
- Intercommunality: District Urbain de Faulquemont

Government
  - Mayor (2024–2026): Béatrice Kempenich
- Area^{1}: 18.79 km^{2} (7.25 sq mi)
- Elevation: 334 m (1,096 ft)
- Highest elevation: 401 m (1,316 ft)
- Lowest elevation: 241 m (791 ft)
- Population (2023): 5,109
  - Density: 271.9/km^{2} (704.2/sq mi)
- Time zone: UTC+01:00 (CET)
  - Summer (DST): UTC+02:00 (CEST)
- INSEE/Postal code: 57209 /57380
- ^{1} French Land Register data, which excludes lakes, ponds, glaciers > 1 km^{2} (0.386 sq mi or 247 acres) and river estuaries.

Faulquemont (French pronunciation: [folkəmɔ̃]; Lorraine Franconian: Folkenburch; German: Falkenberg) is a commune in the Moselle department in Grand Est in north-eastern France.

Localities of the commune: Bonhouse (German: Bohnhaus), Chémery (a.k.a. Chémery-lès-Faulquemont, incorporated in 1973, German: Schemmerich).

== Population ==
Historical population
Year	Pop.	±% p.a.
1968	5,543	—
1975	5,533	−0.03%
1982	5,873	+0.86%
1990	5,432	−0.97%
1999	5,478	+0.09%
2007	5,502	+0.05%
2012	5,459	−0.16%
2017	5,306	−0.57%
2023	5,109	−0.63%
Source: INSEE

== See also ==
- Communes of the Moselle department
