= Matthias I of Lorraine =

Duke of Lorraine from 1138 to 1176

Matthias
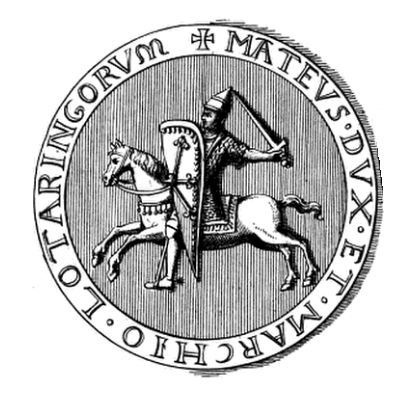
- + MATEUS DUX ET MARCHIO LOTARINGORUM

Duke of Lorraine
- Reign: 1138 - 1176
- Predecessor: Simon I
- Successor: Simon II
- Born: c. 1119
- Died: 13 May 1176
- Burial: Clairlieu abbey, Villers-lès-Nancy
- Spouse: Bertha of Swabia
- Issue: Simon II, Duke of Lorraine; Frederick I, Duke of Lorraine; Judith; Alice; Theoderic; Matthias
- House: House of Lorraine
- Father: Simon I, Duke of Lorraine
- Mother: Adelaide of Leuven

Matthias I (c. 1119 – 13 May 1176) was the duke of Lorraine from 1138 to his death as the eldest son and successor of Simon I and Adelaide. Like his forefathers going back to Theodoric II and even to Adalbert, he was a stern supporter of the king of Germany and Holy Roman Emperor. He married Bertha (sometimes called Judith), daughter of Frederick II, Duke of Swabia, and therefore niece of the Hohenstaufen king Conrad III and sister of Frederick Barbarossa, future emperor.

He accompanied Barbarossa on a number of important occasions, including his imperial coronation by Pope Adrian IV in Rome, 1155. He assisted the emperor in his wars against Adrian and his successor Alexander III and the kings of France and Sicily. He extended his own ducal demesne at the expense of the bishop of Toul, but was an important donor to the Church and founder of abbeys. He died in 1176 and was interred in his abbey of Clairlieu in Villers-lès-Nancy. By his Hohenstaufen marriage (1138), he had:

- Simon (died 1205), his successor in Lorraine
- Frederick (died 1206), count of Bitche and his nephew's successor
- Judith (died 1173), married Stephen II, count of Auxonne (1170)
- Alice (died 1200), married Hugh III, Duke of Burgundy
- Theoderic (died 1181), bishop of Metz (1174–1179)
- Matthias (died 1208), count of Toul
- Unnamed daughter who died young

== See also ==
- Dukes of Lorraine family tree

== Sources ==
- Bogdan, Henry (2005). La Lorraine des ducs (in French). Perrin.
- Bouchard, Constance Brittain (1987). Sword, Miter, and Cloister: Nobility and the Church in Burgundy, 980-1198. Cornell University Press.

Preceded by Simon I	Duke of Lorraine; 1138–1176	Succeeded by Simon II
