= 1071 =

1071 in various calendars
- Gregorian calendar: 1071; MLXXI
- Ab urbe condita: 1824
- Armenian calendar: 520; ԹՎ ՇԻ
- Assyrian calendar: 5821
- Balinese saka calendar: 992–993
- Bengali calendar: 477–478
- Berber calendar: 2021
- English Regnal year: 5 Will. 1 – 6 Will. 1
- Buddhist calendar: 1615
- Burmese calendar: 433
- Byzantine calendar: 6579–6580
- Chinese calendar: 庚戌年 (Metal Dog); 3768 or 3561 — to — 辛亥年 (Metal Pig); 3769 or 3562
- Coptic calendar: 787–788
- Discordian calendar: 2237
- Ethiopian calendar: 1063–1064
- Hebrew calendar: 4831–4832
- Hindu calendars
- Vikram Samvat: 1127–1128
- Shaka Samvat: 992–993
- Kali Yuga: 4171–4172
- Holocene calendar: 11071
- Igbo calendar: 71–72
- Iranian calendar: 449–450
- Islamic calendar: 463–464
- Japanese calendar: Enkyū 3 (延久３年)
- Javanese calendar: 975–976
- Julian calendar: 1071; MLXXI
- Korean calendar: 3404
- Minguo calendar: 841 before ROC 民前841年
- Nanakshahi calendar: −397
- Seleucid era: 1382/1383 AG
- Thai solar calendar: 1613–1614
- Tibetan calendar: ལྕགས་ཕོ་ཁྱི་ལོ་ (male Iron-Dog); 1197 or 816 or 44 — to — ལྕགས་མོ་ཕག་ལོ་ (female Iron-Boar); 1198 or 817 or 45

Year 1071 (MLXXI) was a common year starting on Saturday of the Julian calendar.

== Events ==
=== By place ===
==== Byzantine Empire ====
- August 26 – Battle of Manzikert: The Byzantine army (35,000 men) under Emperor Romanos IV meets the Seljuk Turk forces of Sultan Alp Arslan near the town of Manzikert. Although the armies are initially evenly matched, as the Byzantines advance, the Seljuk Turks withdraw before them, launching hit-and-run attacks on the Byzantine flanks. While attempting to withdraw, the Byzantine army falls apart, either through treachery or confusion; the battle ends in a decisive defeat for the Byzantine Empire. Romanos is captured (though released by Alp Arslan within a week) and much of the elite Varangian Guard is destroyed; this will prove catastrophic for the Byzantine Empire.
- October 24 – Romanos IV is deposed by John Doukas (Caesar) and his political advisor Michael Psellos after his return to Constantinople. Michael VII Doukas is crowned co-emperor and his mother Eudokia is forced to retire to a monastery.
- The Kingdom of Hungary launches a campaign against the Byzantine Empire. They besiege and capture the border fortress of Belgrade, along with Sirmium and Taurunum.

==== Europe ====
- February 22 – Battle of Cassel: Robert I ("the Frisian") defeats his sister-in-law Richilde (widow of Baldwin VI) and her nephew Arnulf III, in a succession struggle for the County of Flanders. Robert is appointed count by King Philip I of France.
- April 15 – Siege of Bari: The capital of Bari, the last Byzantine-controlled city in the Catepanate of Italy, is captured by Italo-Norman forces under Duke Robert Guiscard after a 32-month siege.

==== England ====
- The English rebels under Hereward the Wake and Morcar, Saxon former earl of Northumbria, are forced to retreat to their stronghold on the Isle of Ely in The Fens. They make a desperate stand against the Norman forces led by King William the Conqueror, but are defeated.
- Edwin, earl of Mercia, rebels against William I, but is betrayed and killed. His castle and lands at Dudley (located in the West Midlands) are given to William's Norman subjects.

==== Africa ====
- May – Zaynab an-Nafzawiyyah marries Yusuf ibn Tashfin, leader of the Almoravids, and becomes his queen and co-regent.

== Births ==
- October 22 – William IX ("the Troubador"), duke of Aquitaine (d. 1127)
- Ibn al-Qalanisi, Arab politician and chronicler (d. 1160)

== Deaths ==
- January 26 – Adelaide of Eilenburg, German noblewoman
- February 17 – Frozza Orseolo, German noblewoman (b. 1015)
- February 22 (killed at the Battle of Cassel):
  - Arnulf III, count of Flanders (House of Flanders)
  - William FitzOsbern, 1st Earl of Hereford
- April 17 – Manuel Komnenos, Byzantine aristocrat
- May 24 – Wulfhild of Norway, duchess of Saxony (b. 1020)
- August 22 – Lambert II Suła, archbishop of Kraków
- September 5 – Al-Khatib al-Baghdadi, Arab scholar (b. 1002)
- October 16 – Almodis de la Marche, French nobleman
- December 2 – Ibn 'Abd al-Barr, Moorish judge (b. 978)
- Domenico I Contarini, doge of Venice
- Durand de Bredons, French abbot and bishop
- Edwin (or Ēadwine), earl of Mercia
- Eleanor of Normandy, countess of Flanders (b. 1010)
- Fujiwara no Yorimichi, Japanese nobleman (b. 992)
- Geoffrey of Hauteville, Norman military leader
- Guido da Velate (or Guy), archbishop of Milan
- Henry II, count of Leuven (House of Reginar)
- Ibn Zaydún, Andalusian poet and writer (b. 1003)
- Isabella of Urgell, queen consort of Aragon
- Robert Crispin, Norman mercenary leader
- William Malet, Norman nobleman (approximate date)
