= Anselm of Ribemont =

Frankish 11th century noble

Anselm
- Born: c. 1050; County of Flanders
- Died: 25 February 1099; Arqa, Emirate of Tripoli
- Noble family: Ribemont
- Issue: Godfrey II of Ribemont

Anselm of Ribemont (died 25 February 1099) was a Frankish noblemen from Flanders and a participant in the First Crusade. His letters to archbishop Manasses II of Reims are key pieces of eyewitness accounts to the First Crusade.

== Biography ==
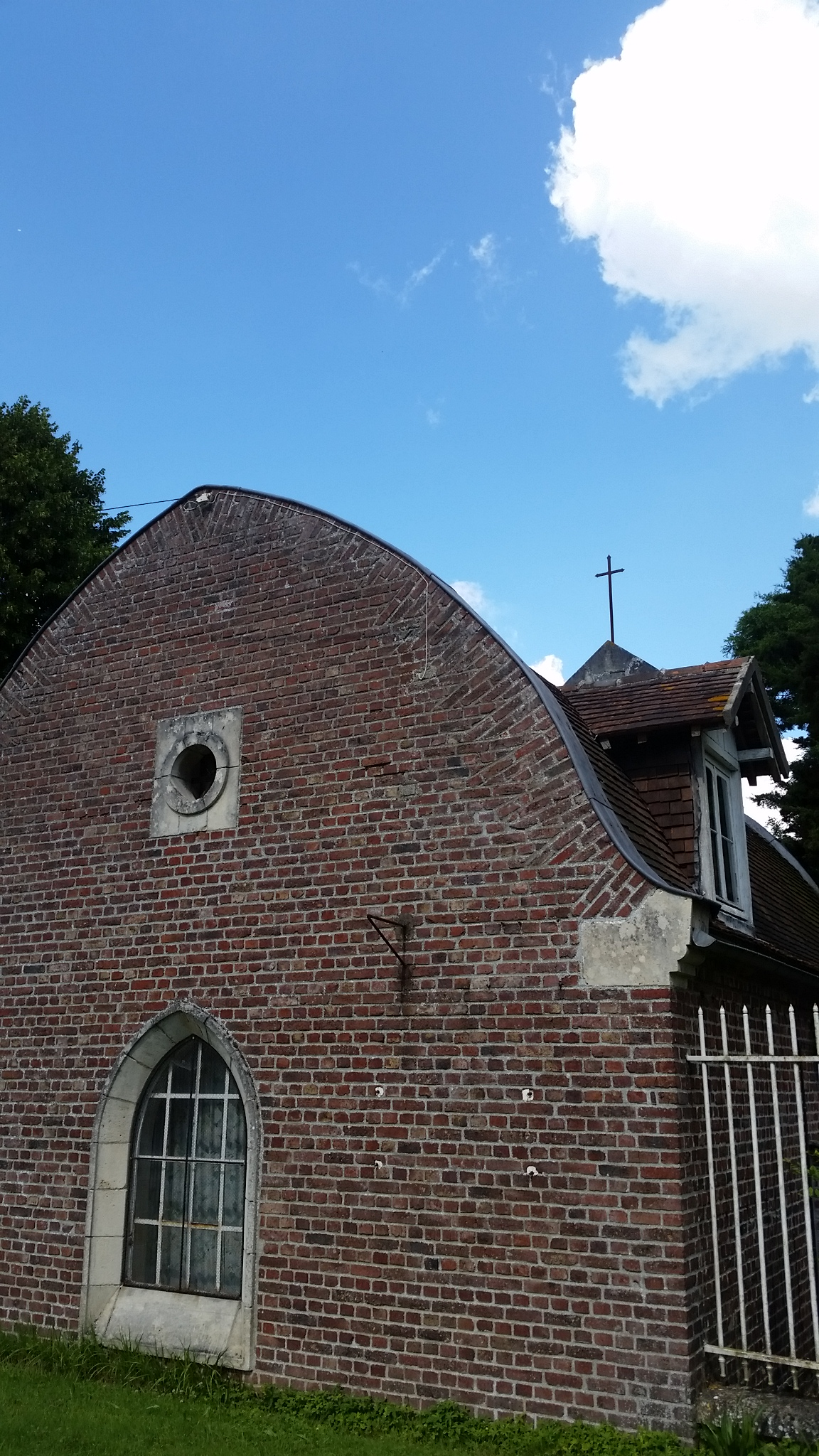
The Abbaye Saint-Nicolas-des-Prés, today defunct, founded by Anselm of Ribemont

=== Origin ===
Anselm of Ribemont was the castellain of Bouchain, Ostrevant and Valenciennes in the late eleventh century. His father died fighting in the battle of Cassel in 1071 fighting in company of count Eustace II of Boulogne for the losing side of Arnulf III, Count of Flanders. After the battle, Anselm continued to support Arnulf's mother Richilde and his brother Baldwin II, Count of Hainaut.

Anselm was known for his piety and devotion, especially to St. Quentin, the patron of the region he lived in. Anselm was also friend of archbishop Manasses II of Reims, benefactor of the religious communities of St. Amand and Anchin and founder of the monastery of Ribemont.

=== First Crusade ===
Anselm joined the First Crusade in the company of Eustace III of Boulogne who was part of the army of Robert II of Flanders. In order to finance the pilgrimage, he took up a mortgage which could be redeemed by his wife, son or any heir. He also settled a dispute with the monks of the Saint-Amand Abbey over rights over mills.

Anselm was accompanied by a certain abbot Roger who served as his chaplain and whose death Anselm reported in his first letter. He is likely to have been one of the lower important nobles who participated in the council of princes that governed the army of the First Crusade.

Anselm's death during the Siege of Arqa, dated to 25 February 1099, is related in most sources. According to the chroniclers of the crusade, he experienced a vision before his death in the night or siesta before in which he met the recently deceased Enguerrand of St Pol who informed him that he would soon join him in Heaven.

=== Family ===
Anselm had one son, Godfrey II, who married in 1120 Yolanda of Hainaut, widow of Baldwin III, Count of Hainaut. Anselm's sister Agnes married Walter Giffard, 1st Earl of Buckingham.

== Letters ==
Anselm wrote two letters to bishop Manasses II of Reims while on the First Crusade, one dated to November 1097 and the other to July 1098. Both are considered genuine, though as many other documents from the First Crusade, they have been subject to rewriting in transmission. According to Hagenmeyer, the letters were also known to the chroniclers Peter Tudebode, Robert the Monk, Raymond of Aguilers, Guibert of Nogent and the author of the Gesta Francorum Ierusalem expugnantium who used them to compose their own narratives.

== Sources ==
- Cokayne, George Edward (1910). The complete peerage of England, Scotland, Ireland, Great Britain, and the United Kingdom : extant, extinct, or dormant. London : The St. Catherine Press, ltd.
- Kostick, Conor (2008). The Social Structure of the First Crusade. BRILL. ISBN 978-90-04-16665-3.
- Montalembert, Charles Forbes comte de (1896). book XVIII. The church and the feudal system. The monastaic orders and society. book XIX. St. Gregory, monk and pope. Appendix. J.C. Nimmo.
- Riley-Smith, Jonathan (1997). The First Crusaders, 1095-1131. Cambridge University Press. ISBN 978-0-521-64603-1.
- Riley-Smith, Jonathan (1 April 2003). The First Crusade and Idea of Crusading. A&C Black. ISBN 978-0-8264-6726-3.
- Smith, Thomas W. (16 April 2024). Rewriting the First Crusade: Epistolary Culture in the Middle Ages. Boydell & Brewer. ISBN 978-1-83765-175-7.
- Tanner, Heather (1 February 2004). Families, Friends and Allies: Boulogne and Politics in Northern France and England, c.879-1160. BRILL. ISBN 978-90-474-0255-8.
