= House of Flanders =

Noble family

- Arms of the County of Flanders
- Country: France; Holy Roman Empire; Jerusalem; Latin Empire
- Founded: 863; 1163 years ago
- Founder: Baldwin Iron Arm
- Final ruler: Jerusalem: Baldwin I Boulogne: Matilda I Flanders: Margaret II
- Titles: Latin Emperor of Constantinople; King of Jerusalem; Defender of the Holy Sepulchre; Queen Consort of England; Duke of Lower Lorraine; Margrave of Flanders; Margrave of Namur; Count of Flanders; Count of Hainaut; Count of Edessa; Count of Boulogne; Count of Namur; Lord of Bouillon
- Estates: Flanders, Hainaut, Constantinople, Boulogne
- Dissolution: February 10, 1280; 746 years ago
- Cadet branches: House of Hainaut; House of Boulogne; House of Mons

The House of Flanders, also called the Baldwins (Latin: Balduini, French: Baudouinides, Dutch: Boudewijns), was a medieval ruling family of Frankish origin that was founded by Baldwin Iron Arm, son-in-law of Charles the Bald. The House of Flanders was the first dynasty to transform a county function of the Carolingian Empire into a hereditary fiefdom, the County of Flanders, falling under West Francia, created by the Treaty of Verdun in 843.

From 1051, the House of Flanders also reigned over the County of Hainaut, with Baldwin I of Hainaut. In 1119, on the death of Baldwin VII, the family had a series of setbacks, but in 1191, the family recovered the title of Count of Flanders with Baldwin VIII (Baldwin V of Hainaut).

The dynasty established the Latin Empire of Constantinople during the Fourth Crusade, and it also briefly ruled the County of Namur (1188–1212). The House of Flanders became extinct in 1280 with the death of Margaret II.

A cadet branch, the House of Boulogne, ruled over the County of Boulogne. Members of this house joined the First Crusade, established the Kingdom of Jerusalem, and produced its first kings.

== Rulers ==
=== Baldwinid dynasty ===
Partitions under Baldwinid dynasty

Hainaut under House of Reginar rule (c.900-1051)	Namur under House of Namur rule (946-1189)
County of Boulogne (918-1152)	County of Flanders (862-1119)
County of Hainaut (1071-1195)
Boulogne inherited by the House of Blois	Inherited by the Estridsen, Normandy and Lorraine/Metz dynasties (1119-1194)
County of Flanders (1191-1280) (Hainaut branch)	Marquisate of Namur (1195-1216)
Inherited by the House of Courtenay
Divided between the House of Avesnes and the House of Dampierre

Table of rulers

Ruler	Born	Reign	Ruling part	Consort	Death	Notes
Baldwin I Iron Arm	c.830 Son of Odoacer?	862 – 879	County of Flanders	Judith of France; 861/66 four children	879; Arras aged 48-49	First known member of the family. Developed himself as a very faithful supporter of Charles the Bald and played an important role in the continuing wars against the Vikings.
Baldwin II the Bald	c.865 Son of Baldwin I and Judith of France	879 – 10 September 918	County of Flanders	Ælfthryth of Wessex c.895 four children	10 September 918 aged 52-53	By 883, he was forced to move north to Pagus Flandransis, which became the territory most closely associated with the Counts of Flanders.
Arnulf I the Great	c.895 First son of Baldwin II and Ælfthryth of Wessex	10 September 918 – 27 March 964	County of Flanders	Adele of Vermandois; 934 five children	27 March 864 aged 68-69	Children of Baldwin II, divided their inheritance. Baldwin associated his eldest son to the throne.
Baldwin III the Young	c.940 Son of Arnulf I and Adele of Vermandois	958 – 1 January 962	County of Flanders	Matilda of Saxony; 934 one child	1 January 962; Bergues aged 21-22	Children of Baldwin II, divided their inheritance. Baldwin associated his eldest son to the throne.
Adelolf	c.895 Second son of Baldwin II and Ælfthryth of Wessex	10 September 918 – 13 November 933	County of Boulogne	Mathilde de Créquy three children	13 November 933 aged 37-38	Children of Baldwin II, divided their inheritance. Baldwin associated his eldest son to the throne.
Arnulf II	c.920 Son of Adelolf and Mathilde de Créquy	13 November 933 – 971	County of Boulogne	Unknown two children	971 aged 50-51	
Regency of Baldwin of Boulogne and Dirk II, Count of Holland (965-976)						
Arnulf II the Young	c.961 Son of Baldwin III and Matilda of Saxony	27 March 964 – 30 March 987	County of Flanders	Rozala of Italy; 976 two children	30 March 987; Ghent aged 25-26	
Arnulf III	c.940 Son of Arnulf II	971 – 990	County of Boulogne	Unknown three children	990 aged 49-50	Profited from the minority of Baldwin IV of Flanders to achieve more independence for Boulogne.
Regency of Matilda of Saxony and Rozala of Italy (987-c.994)						
Baldwin IV the Bearded	c.980 Son of Arnulf II and Rozala of Italy	30 March 987 – 30 May 1035	County of Flanders	Ogive of Luxembourg; 1012 two children Eleanor of Normandy; 1031 one child	30 May 1035; Ghent aged 54-55	
Baldwin II	c.960 First son of Arnulf III	990 – 1027	County of Boulogne (at Boulogne proper)	Adelina of Holland c.990 one child	1027 aged 66-67	Children of Arnulf III, divided their inheritance. Arnulf IV's share was, after his death, absorbed by Flanders.
Arnulf IV	c.960 Second son of Arnulf III	990 – 1019	County of Boulogne (at Ternois)	Unmarried?	1019 aged 58-59	Children of Arnulf III, divided their inheritance. Arnulf IV's share was, after his death, absorbed by Flanders.
Ternois annexed to the County of Flanders
Eustace I the Pierced Eye	c.990 Son of Baldwin II and Adelina of Holland	1027 – 1047	County of Boulogne	Matilda of Louvain; 1015 four children	1047 aged 56-57	
Baldwin V the Pious	19 August 1012; Arras; Son of Baldwin IV and Ogive of Luxembourg	30 May 1035 – 1 September 1067	County of Flanders	Adela of France; 1028; Amiens three children	1 September 1067; Lille aged 55	
Eustace II the Long Moustache	c.1015 Son of Eustace I and Matilda of Louvain	1047 – 1087	County of Boulogne	Godgifu of Wessex; 1035 no children Ida of Lower Lorraine; 1049 four children	1087 aged 71-72	
Baldwin VI & I the Good	c.1030 First son of Baldwin V and Adela of France	1051 – 17 July 1070	County of Hainaut (jure uxoris, ruling with his wife)	Richilde, Countess of Hainaut; 1051 three children	17 July 1070; Hasnon aged 39-40	
Baldwin VI & I the Good	c.1030 First son of Baldwin V and Adela of France	1 September 1067 – 17 July 1070	County of Flanders	Richilde, Countess of Hainaut; 1051 three children	17 July 1070; Hasnon aged 39-40	
Regency of Richilde, Countess of Hainaut (1070-1071)						Ruled under his mother. Died in battle against his uncle.
Arnulf III the Unfortunate	c.1055 First son of Baldwin VI & I and Richilde, Countess of Hainaut	17 July 1070 – 22 February 1071	County of Flanders (with County of Hainaut, ruling with his mother)	Unmarried	22 February 1071; Battle of Cassel aged 15-16	Ruled under his mother. Died in battle against his uncle.
Robert I the Frisian	c.1035 Second son of Baldwin V and Adela of France	22 February 1071 – 13 October 1093	County of Flanders	Gertrude of Saxony; 1063 five children	13 October 1093; Torhout aged 57-58	After Arnulf's death, the counties divided: Robert, Arnulf's uncle, kept Flanders, and Baldwin and his mother ruled in Hainaut. Baldwin claimed his uncle's property for some time. Robert's nickname comes from his regency in the County of Holland.
Regency of Richilde, Countess of Hainaut (1071-1076)						After Arnulf's death, the counties divided: Robert, Arnulf's uncle, kept Flanders, and Baldwin and his mother ruled in Hainaut. Baldwin claimed his uncle's property for some time. Robert's nickname comes from his regency in the County of Holland.
Baldwin II	1056; Second son of Baldwin VI & I and Richilde, Countess of Hainaut	22 February 1071 – 1098	County of Hainaut (ruling with his mother until 1076)	Ida of Louvain; 1084 nine children	1098; İznik aged 41-42	After Arnulf's death, the counties divided: Robert, Arnulf's uncle, kept Flanders, and Baldwin and his mother ruled in Hainaut. Baldwin claimed his uncle's property for some time. Robert's nickname comes from his regency in the County of Holland.
Eustace III	c.1050 Son of Eustace II and Ida of Lower Lorraine	1087 – 1125	County of Boulogne	Mary of Scotland; 1101 two children	1125; Rumilly aged 74-75	
Robert II the Crusader	c.1065 Son of Robert I and Gertrude of Saxony	13 October 1093 – 5 October 1111	County of Flanders	Clementia of Burgundy; 1092 three children	5 October 1111; Meaux aged 45-46	
Regency of Ida of Louvain (1098-1102)						
Baldwin III	1088; Son of Baldwin II and Ida of Louvain	1098 – 1120	County of Hainaut	Yolande of Guelders; 1102 four children	1120 aged 31-32	
Regency of Clementia of Burgundy (1111-1119)						Left no children. He left the county to a maternal cousin.
Baldwin VII With the Axe	1093; Son of Robert II and Clementia of Burgundy	5 October 1111 – 17 July 1119	County of Flanders	Hawise-Agnes Fergent of Brittany; 1110 (annulled) no children	17 July 1119; Roulers aged 25-26	Left no children. He left the county to a maternal cousin.
Flanders inherited by the House of Estridsen (1119-1127), House of Normandy (1127-1128) and House of Lorraine (1128-1194)
Regency of Yolande of Guelders (1120-1127)						
Baldwin IV the Builder	1108; Son of Baldwin III and Yolande of Guelders	1120 – 8 November 1171	County of Hainaut	Alice of Namur; 1130 eight children	8 November 1171 aged 62-63	
Matilda I	1105; Boulogne; Daughter of Eustace III and Mary of Scotland	1125 – 3 May 1152	County of Boulogne	Stephen, King of England; 1125 three children	3 May 1152; Hedingham Castle, Essex aged 56-57	Also Queen of England.
Boulogne inherited by the House of Blois
Baldwin V & VIII the Courageous	1150; Son of Baldwin IV and Alice of Namur	8 November 1171 – 17 December 1195	County of Hainaut (with Marquisate of Namur from 1189)	Margaret I, Countess of Flanders; 1169 seven children	17 December 1195; Mons aged 44-45	Through his marriage, the family regained Flanders.
Baldwin V & VIII the Courageous	1150; Son of Baldwin IV and Alice of Namur	1 August 1191 – 15 November 1194	County of Flanders (jure uxoris, until 1194)	Margaret I, Countess of Flanders; 1169 seven children	17 December 1195; Mons aged 44-45	Through his marriage, the family regained Flanders.
Baldwin VI & IX	July 1172; Valenciennes; First son of Baldwin V & VIII and Margaret I, Countess of Flanders	15 November 1194 – July 1205	County of Flanders (with County of Hainaut from 1195)	Marie of Champagne; 6 January 1186; Valenciennes two children	July 1205; Veliko Tarnovo aged 32-33	Children of Baldwin V/VIII, divided their inheritance. After the Fourth Crusade, Baldwin became the first Latin Emperor at Constantinople. Philip became regent of Flanders for his niece and, after his death, left Namur to his sister.
Philip the Noble	March 1174; Valenciennes; Second son of Baldwin V & VIII and Margaret I, Countess of Flanders	17 December 1195 – 9 October 1212	Marquisate of Namur	Alice of Namur; 1130 eight children	9 October 1212; Valenciennes aged 38	Children of Baldwin V/VIII, divided their inheritance. After the Fourth Crusade, Baldwin became the first Latin Emperor at Constantinople. Philip became regent of Flanders for his niece and, after his death, left Namur to his sister.
Regency of Philip, Marquis of Namur (1205-1212)						Ruled with her husbands. Between 1214 and 1223, she ruled alone, as Ferdinand became a prisoner after his defeat at the Battle of Bouvines.
Joan	1199; Valenciennes; First daughter of Baldwin VI & IX and Marie of Champagne	July 1205 – 5 December 1244	County of Flanders (with County of Hainaut)	Ferdinand of Portugal; 1 January 1212; Paris one child Thomas of Savoy, Lord of Piedmont; 1237 no children	July 1205; Marquette-lez-Lille aged 44-45	Ruled with her husbands. Between 1214 and 1223, she ruled alone, as Ferdinand became a prisoner after his defeat at the Battle of Bouvines.
Yolande	1175; Valenciennes; Daughter of Baldwin V & VIII and Margaret I, Countess of Flanders	9 October 1212 – 1216	Marquisate of Namur	Peter II of Courtenay; 1193 twelve children	August 1219; Constantinople aged 44-45	Sister of Philip and heiress of the Latin Empire, inherited Namur from her brother. All her property was inherited by her descendants, the House of Courtenay.
Namur inherited by the House of Courtenay
Margaret I & II the Black	1202; Valenciennes; Second daughter of Baldwin VI & IX and Marie of Champagne	5 December 1244 – 10 February 1280	County of Flanders (with County of Hainaut)	Bouchard of Avesnes; 1212 (annulled 1215) two children William II of Dampierre; 1223 five children	10 February 1280; Ghent aged 76-77	Divided her two counties between the sons of each of her husbands.
Hainaut inherited by the House of Avesnes; Flanders inherited by the House of Dampierre

== Genealogy ==
- Baldwin Iron Arm, Count of Flanders († 879)
  - Baldwin II the Bald, Count of Flanders († 918)
    - Arnulf I the Great, Count of Flanders († 965)
      - Elftrude, born circa 932, married in 964 to Siegfried, Count of Guînes († 965)
      - Hildegarde (934 † 990), married in 943 to Dirk II, Count of Holland (930 † 988)
      - Egbert (937 † 953)
      - Liutgarde (938 † 964), married in 950 to Wichmann IV, Count of Hamaland and Ghent.
      - Baldwin III, Count of Flanders († 962)
        - Arnulf II, Count of Flanders († 988)
          - Mathilda († 995 or before)
          - Baldwin IV the Bearded (v.980 † 1035), Count of Flanders († 1035)
            - Baldwin V of Lille, Count of Flanders († 1067)
              - Baldwin VI the Good, (1030 - 1070), Count of Flanders and of Hainaut
                - Arnulf III of Flanders (1055 † 1071), Count of Flanders and Hainaut
                - Baldwin II of Hainaut (1056 † 1098), Count of Hainaut
                  - Baldwin III of Hainaut (1088 † 1120), Count of Hainaut
                    - Baldwin IV the Builder (1108 † 1171), Count of Hainaut
                      - Agnes of Hainaut, married Ralph I, Lord of Coucy
                      - Baldwin V of Hainaut (1150 † 1195), Count of Hainaut
                        - Isabella of Hainault (°1170- †1190), married Philip II of France
                        - Baldwin VI of Hainaut (°1171- †1205), Count of Flanders and Hainaut, Latin Emperor of Constantinople
                          - Joan (1199-1200 † 1244), Countess of Flanders and of Hainaut
                          - Margaret II (c. 1202 † 1280), Countess of Flanders and of Hainaut
                        - Yolanda (°1175- †1219), married Peter II of Courtenay, Latin Emperor of Constantinople
                        - Philip the Noble, Marquis of Namur (°1175- †1212)
                        - Henry (°1176- †1216), Latin Emperor of Constantinople
                        - Sybille (°1179- †1217), married to Guichard IV, Sire of Beaujeu
                        - Eustace (†1217), regent of the Kingdom of Thessalonica
              - Matilda (1032 - 1083), married in 1053 to William the Conqueror
              - Robert the Frisian, (1033 - 1093), Count of Flanders from 1071 to 1093
                - Robert II, Count of Flanders from 1093 to 1111
                  - Baldwin VII (1093-1119), Count of Flanders
                  - Guillaume (1094-1109)
                  - Philip (1095-) (died young)
                - Adela of Flanders († 1115), married firstly Canute IV of Denmark. Married secondly Roger Borsa, Duke of Apulia.
                  - Charles I, Count of Flanders (1084 – 1127)
                - Gertrude (1080 - † 1117), married to Henry III († 1095) Count of Louvain and Brussels, then in 1096 to Theodoric II, Duke of Lorraine († 1115).
                - Philip of Loo, whose illegitimate son William of Ypres was a claimant to the county of Flanders.
                - Ogive, abbess of Mesen.
            - Judith of Flanders, Countess of Northumbria (1037 † 1094), married in 1058 to Tostig Godwinson († 1066), Earl of Northumbria, then in 1071 to Welf I, Duke of Bavaria († 1101)
    - Adelolf († 933), Count of Boulogne
      - Arnulf II († 971), Count of Boulogne
        - Arnulf III († 990), Count of Boulogne
          - Baldwin II († 1025), Count of Boulogne
            - Eustace I (v. 995 † 1049), Count of Boulogne
              - Eustace II († 1087), Count of Boulogne
                - Eustace III, Count of Boulogne (1056 † 1125)
                  - Matilda I, Countess of Boulogne (1105 † 1152), married in 1125 to Stephen of England
                - Godfrey of Bouillon (1058 † 1099), Duke of Lower Lorraine, a leader of the First Crusade and "Advocate of the Holy Sepulchre"
                - Baldwin I of Jerusalem (1065 † 1118), accompanied his brother to the Holy Land, became Count of Edessa and then King of Jerusalem
              - Godfrey († 1095), Bishop of Paris
              - Lambert II, Count of Lens († 1054)
              - Gerberge († 1049), married Frederick, Duke of Lower Lorraine (1003 † 1065)
          - Arnulf IV, Count of Ternois
