= Baldwin, Count of Hainaut =

Baldwin, Count of Hainaut may refer to:

- Baldwin I, Count of Hainaut (r. 1051–70), also Baldwin VI of Flanders
- Baldwin II, Count of Hainaut (r. 1070–98)
- Baldwin III, Count of Hainaut (r. 1098–1120)
- Baldwin IV, Count of Hainaut (r. 1120–1171)
- Baldwin V, Count of Hainaut (r. 1171–95), also Baldwin VIII of Flanders
- Baldwin VI, Count of Hainaut (r. 1195–1205), also Baldwin IX of Flanders and Baldwin I of the Latin Empire

== See also ==
- Baldwin (name)
