= Hasnon Abbey =

Benedictine abbey founded in the 7th century in Hasnon, France

Coordinates: 50.4241°N 3.4016°E

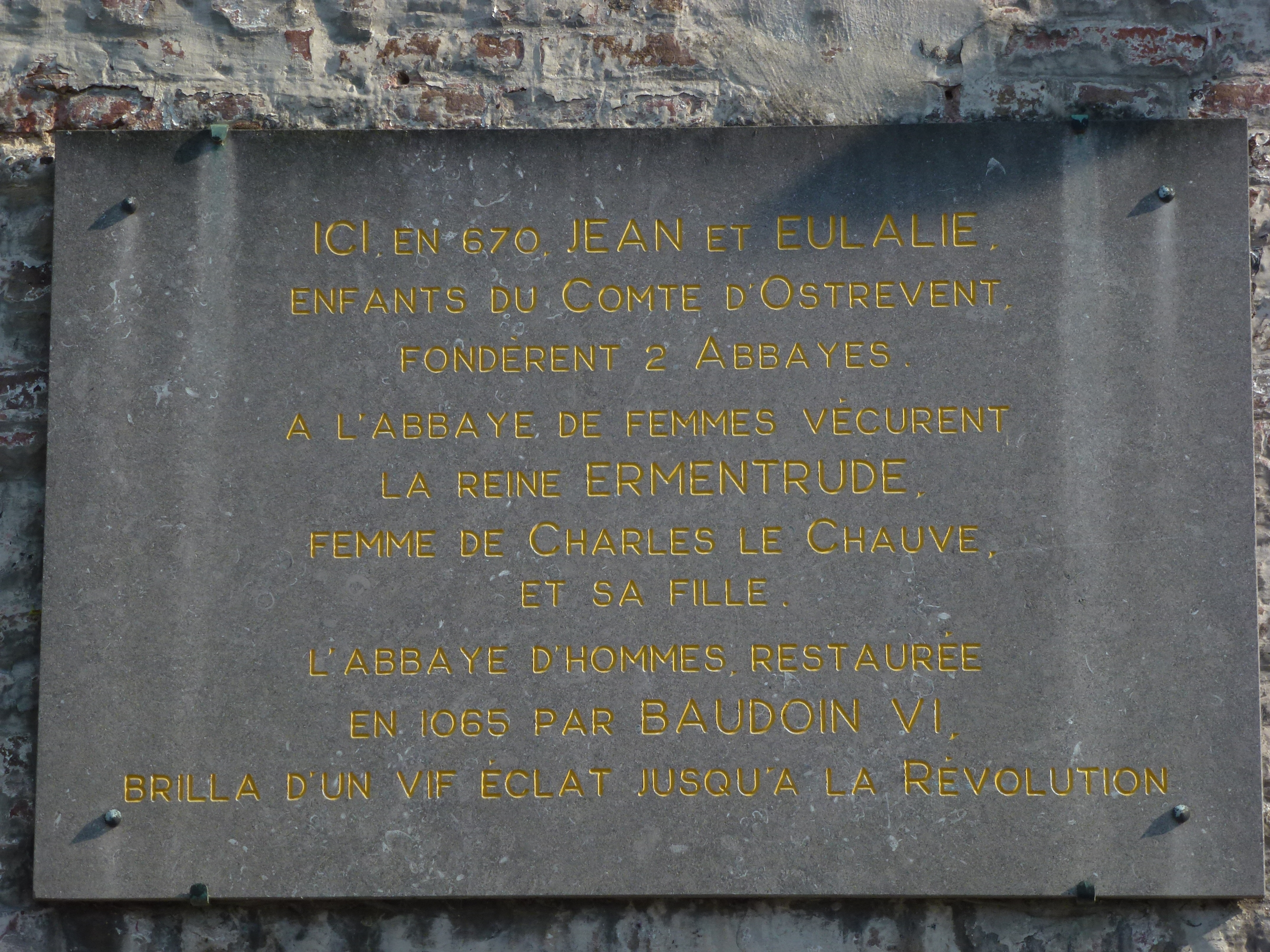
Plaque commemorating the abbey

Hasnon Abbey was a Benedictine monastery, originally founded in the 7th century in Hasnon, near Saint-Amand-les-Eaux and Valenciennes in the department of Nord in France. It was reopened in 1065 as a Benedictine abbey under the instruction of Malbod, abbot of St. Amand. Baldwin VI of Flanders built a church nearby which was consecrated in 1070 and called St. Peter's of Hasnon. The abbey was reformed once again in the 15th century under Laurent d'Ivoire, abbot of Hasnon. During the French Revolution the structures forming the abbey were destroyed.

== History ==
In 670, on his patrimonial grounds, a certain John established a double monastery. The men were under the authority of John while the women were led by his sister Eulalia. In 691, it was consecrated by Saint Vindicien, Bishop of Cambrai and Bishop of Arras. Ermentrude (854–877), daughter of Charles the Bald, was made abbess of Hasnon.

=== 9th century ===
In 880, the monastery was destroyed by the Normans. (Note: Jules Dewez claims that Hasnon abbey was destroyed by a Norman raid in 880.) By 954, the abbey had become secularized, being controlled by canons.

=== 11/12th century ===
In 1063, the abbey received its first concession from Baldwin V of Flanders consisting of a usufruct grant for abbot Bovo's brother Gerbod. In 1065, Baldwin, son of Baldwin V, Count of Flanders, instructed the abbot of St. Amand, Malbod, to create a Benedictine monastery at Hasnon Abbey. Malbod sent monks and confirmed Bovo as abbot of Hasnon. The abbey's charter was confirmed during the Estates General of France held by Philip I of France in Corbie in 1065.

Baldwin VI of Flanders built a church near the abbey which was called St. Peter's of Hasnon. It was consecrated 3 June 1070. On 17 July 1070, Baldwin died and was buried in the church. On 25/26 March 1094, Urban II wrote a letter freeing all abbots, including Hasnon's, to address the legal problems brought on by their prior pledge of obedience to the bishop of Arras. In 1108, letters from Lambert, bishop of Arras, requested the attendance of the abbot of Hasnon, among other abbots, at the episcopal court. During the interdict placed on Baldwin IX of Flanders territory, the abbey continued to function and receive grants.

=== 15th century ===
From 1446 to 1469, the abbey was reformed by monks from Florennes at the invitation of abbot Laurent d'Ivoire.

=== 18th century ===
Like so many others, Hasnon abbey was suppressed by the French Revolution, which also caused the monks to disperse, the documents to be scattered, and the abbey structures to be destroyed, of which nothing is left. One batch of documents is currently housed in the Archives du Nord in Lille, while another was in the State Archives in Mons prior to the bombardment during World War II. The Douai Library possesses a 15th-century cartulary, this repository has a 13th-century one that was thankfully spared from the 1940 destruction.

== List of abbots of Hasnon ==
- John (co-founder)
- Bovo c.1065
- Albert (1091 – 21 April 1109)
- Boniface (1109 – 13 September 1118)
- Roger (1243 - 19 August 1260)
- Revelerins (1261 - 3 October 1270)
- Arnulphe (1271 - 20 October 1294)
- Ode (1295 - 27 May 1301)
- Alard from 1301
- Pierre from 1309
- Laurent d'Ivoire c.1446

== List of abbesses of Hasnon ==
- Eulalia (co-founder)
- Ermentrude, daughter of Charles the Bald and Ermentrude of Orléans.

== Sources ==
- Arnould, Maurice-A. (1959). "Fragments d'un compte de l'abbaye Saint-Pierre d'Hasnon (1492)". Bulletin de la Commission royale d'Histoire (in French). 124: 197–211. doi:10.3406/bcrh.1959.1559. hdl:2013/ULB-DIPOT:oai:dipot.ulb.ac.be:2013/232512.
- Herman of Tournai (1996). The Restoration of the Monastery of Saint Martin of Tournai. Translated by Nelson, Lynn H. The Catholic University Press of America.
- LaVoy, Hailey (2015). "Hirmindrut Sculdarissa: A Ninth-Century Woman's Original Letter and its Implications". The Journal of Medieval Latin. 25: 29–50. doi:10.1484/J.JML.5.109439.
- Moore, John C. (1962). "Count Baldwin IX of Flanders, Philip Augustus, and the Papal Power". Speculum. 37 (1 (Jan.)): 79–89. doi:10.2307/2850600. JSTOR 2850600.
- Schulenburg, Jane Tibbetts (1998). Forgetful of Their Sex: Female Sanctity and Society, ca. 500–1100. University of Chicago Press.
- Smirnova, Victoria (2023). Medieval Exempla in Transition. Liturgical Press.
- Tanner, Heather (2004). Families, Friends and Allies: Boulogne and Politics in Northern France and England, c.879-1160. Brill.
- Van der Essen, L. (1912). "Vindicianus, Saint". The Catholic Encyclopedia. Vol. XV. Robert Appleton Company.
- Vanderputten, Steven (2012). "Abbatial Obedience, Liturgical Rerom, and the Threat of Monastic Autonomy at the Turn of the Twelfth Century". The Catholic Historical Review. 98 (2 (April)): 241–270. doi:10.1353/cat.2012.0139.
- Vanderputten, Steven (2013). Monastic Reform as Process: Realities and Representations in Medieval Flanders, 900-1100. Cornell University Press.
- Vanderputten, Steven (2018). Dark Age Nunneries: The Ambiguous Identity of Female Monasticism, 800–1050. Cornell University Press.
