= Herman of Hainaut =

Herman (died 3 July 1049), Count of Mons and Hainaut, son of Reginar V, Count of Mons, and Mathilde of Verdun, daughter of Herman, Count of Verdun.

As the Count of Mons, a title inherited from his father, he allied with Godfrey the Bearded, Duke of Lorraine, and Baldwin V, Count of Flanders, against Emperor Henry III. This won the countship of Valenciennes, completing the reconstruction of Hainaut. His wife, who preferred an alliance with the emperor, attempted to get Herman to imprison Wazo, Bishop of Liège, but he refused.

In 1040, Herman married Richilde, whose origins are uncertain. Herman and Richilde had two children:

- Roger de Hainaut (d. 1093), Bishop of Châlons-sur-Marne 1066-1093
- Gertrude, a nun of the Order of St. Benedict.

After the death of Herman, Richilde married the son of Baldwin V, who arranged for Herman's children to be disinherited. Richilde's new husband, Baldwin VI the Good, became Herman's successor and count of a unified Hainaut/Flanders. Because of this passage of Hainaut to her new husband and children, Richilde is sometimes wrongly portrayed as daughter of Reginar V. Her true parentage is subject to speculation, one theory being that she was the daughter of a count of Eguisheim and Dagsbourg.

== Sources ==
- Napran, Laura (Translator), Gilbert of Mons, Chronicle of Hainaut, Boydell Press, Suffolk, 2005
- Varenbergh, Emile, Herman, Académie royale de Belgique, Biographie nationale, vol. 9, Bruxelles, 1887 [détail des éditions]
