= Baldwin II of Hainaut =

11th-century count of Hainaut

Baldwin II
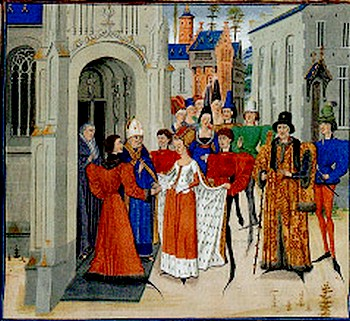
- A 15th century depiction of Baldwin II
- Born: 1056
- Died: presumably 1098; Anatolia (modern-day Turkey)
- Noble family: House of Flanders
- Spouse: Ida of Louvain
- Issue: Baldwin III, Count of Hainaut
- Father: Baldwin VI & I, Count of Flanders and Hainaut
- Mother: Richilde, Countess of Mons and Hainaut

Baldwin II (1056–1098?) was count of Hainaut from 1071 to his death. He was an unsuccessful claimant to the County of Flanders. He disappeared in Anatolia during the First Crusade.

== Early life ==
Baldwin was the younger son of Count Baldwin VI of Flanders and Countess Richilde of Hainaut. He became count of Hainaut after the death of his older brother, Arnulf III of Flanders, at the battle of Cassel. The County of Flanders was then claimed by their victorious uncle Robert the Frisian. During Baldwin's minority reign, which lasted until 1083, Richilde constantly fought against Robert to recover Flanders for her son, but she was unsuccessful. In order to obtain funds, she enfeoffed the county to the Prince-Bishopric of Liège. With the funds obtained in the transaction, around 1072, she assembled a coalition that included the duke of Bouillon, the counts of Namur, Louvain, Montaigu, Chiny, Hautmont (Clermont, according to Reiffenberg) and others, all to no avail: Robert defeated the coalition decisively at Broqueroie.

== Family ==
Baldwin married Ida, a daughter of Count Henry II of Leuven and sister of Count Godfrey I of Leuven, in 1084. Their children were:

1. Baldwin III, Count of Hainaut
2. Louis, living 1096
3. Simon, a canon in Liège
4. Henry, living 1096
5. William, died after 1117
6. Arnold; m. Beatrix von Ath (b. c. 1075 – before 1136), daughter of Walter von Ath and Ade de Roucy. Father of Eustace the Elder of Roeulx.
7. Ida, (c. 1085 – after 1101); 1m: Guy de Chievres; 2m: c. 1100 Thomas, Lord of Coucy (also called Thomas of Marle)
8. Richilde, (c. 1095 – after 1118); m. c. 1115 (div. 1118) Amaury III de Montfort. Became a nun at Maubeuge after the death of her husband.
9. Aelidis, (before 1098 – 1153); m. Nicolas II de Rumigny

== Crusade ==
Baldwin joined the First Crusade in the army of Godfrey of Bouillon (rather than with his nearer relative Robert II of Flanders, whose family was still at odds with his own), after selling some of his property to the Prince-Bishopric of Liège. In 1098 he was sent back to Constantinople with Count Hugh of Vermandois after the siege of Antioch, to seek assistance from Byzantine emperor Alexius I. However, Baldwin disappeared during a raid by the Seljuk Turks in Anatolia, and was presumably killed. Baldwin's fate remained uncertain for a long time. While on a pilgrimage to Jerusalem in 1106, Baldwin's wife Ida organized a search for her lost husband in Anatolia, which was inconclusive.

== See also ==
- Counts of Hainaut family tree

Baldwin II of Hainaut House of Flanders Born: 1056 Died: presumably 1098
Preceded by Arnulf I	Count of Hainaut; 1071–1098?	Succeeded by Baldwin III
