= Imperial Flanders =

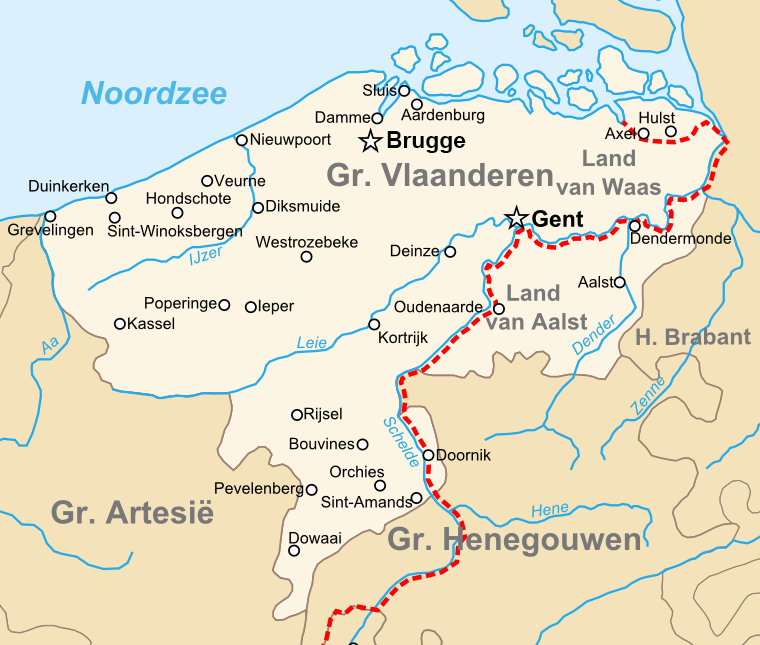
The County of Flanders, with the red line indicating the border between Imperial Flanders and Crown Flanders.

Imperial Flanders is the name for the part of County of Flanders, which is located within the Holy Roman Empire, and was held in fief of the Holy Roman Emperor by the Count of Flanders.

== History ==
The County of Flanders emerged in the 9th century as a fief from France and by the Treaty of Verdun had the river Scheldt as border with Lotharingia.

In the 11th century, the counts of Flanders started to expand their county eastwards, and became vassals of the Holy Roman Emperor. The lands they held in fief from the Holy Roman Emperor were called Imperial Flanders. whilst the part of Flanders held in fief from the King of France was called Crown Flanders.

== Bibliography ==
- De Maesschalck, Edward (2019). De Graven van Vlaanderen (861-1384) [The Counts of Flanders (861-1384)] (in Dutch) (2nd ed.). DavidsFonds / Standaard uitgeverij. ISBN 9789002268458.
