= Baldwin I of Flanders =

Margrave of Flanders from 862 to 879

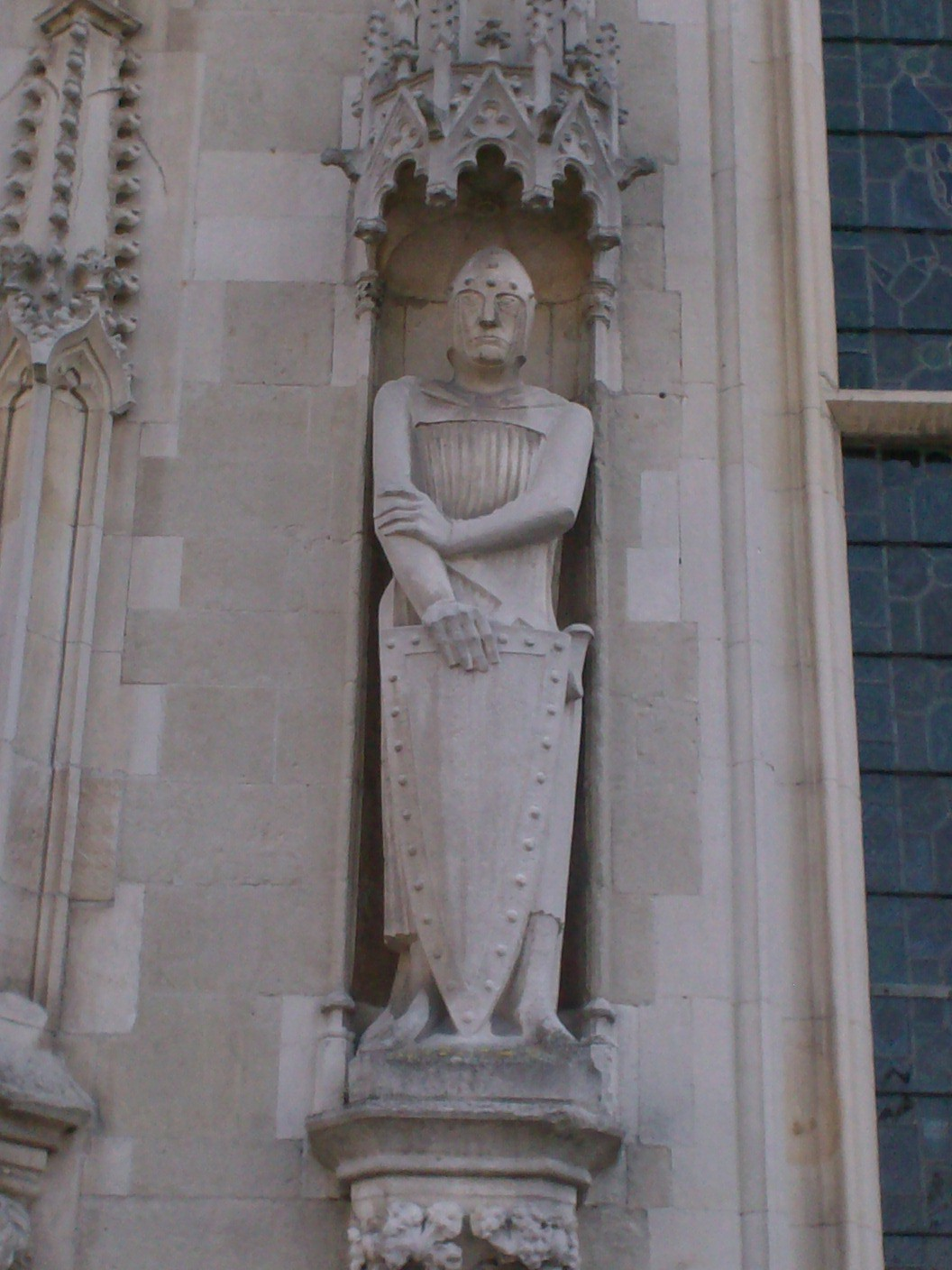
Statue of Baldwin I at the Bruges City Hall

Baldwin I (Note: Old Dutch *Baltwini, Dutch Boudewijn, French Baudouin, German Balduin, Latin Balduinus) (probably 830s – 879), also known as Baldwin Iron Arm (Note: Dutch Boudewijn met de IJzeren Arm, French Baudouin Bras de Fer, German Balduin Eisenarm, Latin Balduinus Ferreus or Balduinus Ferreorum-brachiorum) or Baldwin the Good (Note: Dutch Boudewijn de Goede, French Baudouin le Bon, German Balduin der Gute, Latin Balduinus Bonus) was the first margrave of Flanders, which evolved into the County of Flanders.

== Elopement with a princess ==
The ancestry and early life of Baldwin are unknown, he rose to prominence when in 861 he eloped with Judith, daughter of Charles the Bald, king of West Francia. Judith had previously been married to Æthelwulf and Æthelbald, kings of Wessex, but after the latter's death in 860, she returned to France. Around the Christmas of 861, at the instigation of Baldwin and with her brother Louis's consent, Judith escaped the custody into which she had been placed in the city of Senlis, Oise after her return from England. Charles had given no permission for a marriage and had his bishop Hincmar excommunicate the couple. Baldwin and Judith found temporary refuge at the court of Lothair II, but when Charles threatened Lothair, Baldwin and Judith travelled to Rome to plead their case with Pope Nicholas I.

19th century portrait of Baldwin by artist Albrecht De Vriendt

By 23 November 862, their plea was successful in that they had won the support of Pope Nicholas. In June 863 Rodoald, Bishop of Porto in Italy and John, Bishop of Cervia were sent by Pope Nicholas to pressure King Charles into consenting to Judith and Baldwin's marriage. Charles reconciled with his daughter in October 863 at Verberie. In December 863 Baldwin and Judith got married in the cathedral in Auxerre, in the presence of Charles the Bald. After the marriage, Charles ordered Hincmar to lift the excommunication. Hincmar recorded the story of Baldwain and Judith in his Annales Bertiniani, where he vehemently opposed their marriage.

== Career ==
King Charles sent Baldwin to the northern regions of his kingdom, where Vikings were making repeated incursions. The Annales Bertiniani mention how the Vikings were driven away in 864 from the Scheldt estuary and instead sailed further North to the Rhine. He was appointed Margrave of Flanders. In 866, Pope Nicholas intervened one more time on behalf of Baldwin, prodding Charles to grant more honours to his son-in-law. By 870, Baldwin was appointed lay abbot of Saint Peter's Abbey in Ghent and is assumed to have also acquired the county of Waasland. In 871 Baldwin mediated between Charles and his rebellious son Carloman. When Charles went to war in Italy in 877, Baldwin was one of the several aristocrats appointed to assist the emperor's son, Louis the Stammerer. By this time he was referred to as count (Latin: comes) in the few written sources mentioning him. The fact that Baldwin does not appear in much written sources may also indicate that his tenure was rather uneventful. During his life, Baldwin expanded his territory into one of the major principalities of Western Francia.

Baldwin died in 879 and was buried in the Abbey of St-Bertin, near Saint-Omer. As the monks of Saint-Bertin did not allow women to enter the abbey, not even for burial, Ælfthryth, his daughter-in-law, decided to bury her husband Baldwin II at the abbey of Saint-Peter in Ghent. All next four successive counts of Flanders were buried with their spouses at this abbey, making it the necropolis of the counts of Flanders. In an apparent attempt to give their own abbey more importance, the monks of Saint-Peter claimed in their eleventh-century Annales Blandiniensis, that Baldwin was also buried at their abbey. As a result, some confusion rose since over the exact place of his burial. In 1380 the abbot John of Ypres of Saint-Bertain added to the confusion by stating that Baldwin was buried in Saint-Bertain but his heart was interred in Saint-Peter, which was clearly false since heart-burial was not yet practised at the time.

The burial of Baldwin in Saint-Bertain was recorded in the Annales Vedastini and indirectly by Folcuin in his Gesta abbatum Sithiensium (Deeds of the Abbots of Saint-Bertin). Folcuin did not record the burial of Baldwin I in his chronicle of the abbey of Saint-Bertin, but when Baldwin II died, he notes that some warriors of Baldwin II wanted to bury him next to his father in Saint-Bertain.

In the Annales Blandiniensis Baldwin appeared for the first time with his later nickname "The Iron" ( "ferreus"). The Annales Blandiniensis also mentioned twice that Baldwin was the son of Audacer, and Audacer himself appeared with the title of count and lay abbot in an entry of the year 856.

== Issue ==
Baldwin I and Judith had at least two sons:

- Baldwin II (c. 866 – 918), who succeeded as margrave of Flanders
- Rudolf (c. 869 – 896), who became count of Cambrai around 888; he and his brother attacked Vermandois and captured Arras, Saint-Quentin and Peronne. But in 896 Herbert I of Vermandois with the support of the royal army, recaptured these towns and Rudolf/Ralph was killed during battle.

In addition, a third son and one or two daughters are sometimes attributed to Judith and Baldwin, although these accounts should be treated with caution as they are based on unreliable sources:

- Charles (c. 864/865 – ?), named after his maternal grandfather. He was first recorded in a book Flandicarum rerum tomi X published by an antiquarian Jacob De Meyere in 1531. Jacob did not provide sources, and in fact it would have been quite audacious for Baldwin and Judith to give their child the name Charles, since in the ninth century it was a name reserved for kings only. This claim of the existence of a third son has been repeated in subsequent works : for example, Charles was recorded as "Karolus brevis vite" in the list of counts of Flanders in the Cartulaire de Saint-Bertin compiled in 1840. Vanderputten assumes that the name had been added to the Flandicarum rerum tomi X in some medieval confusion, and doubts whether Charles existed at all.
- Guinidilde or Gunhild (died before 19 February 904), who allegedly married Wilfred the Hairy, Count of Barcelona, as mentioned in the twelfth-century "Gesta comitum Barcionensium". Vanderputten and West give little credence to this claim and call the marriage legendary.
- In the Epistolae Karolini Aevi, an unnamed daughter of Baldwin was recorded ("filia Balduini generi regis") as nun in the monastery of Laon. Some historians attributed this girl to a previous relationship of Baldwin, but as she was recorded originating from a royal family, she was more likely the daughter of Judith.

== Sources ==
- De Donder, Vic (2007). In de naam van Vlaanderen. Een historie (8ste - 21ste eeuw) [In Flanders' name. A history (8th-21st century)] (in Dutch). Leuven: Davidsfonds. ISBN 9789058264985.
- De Maesschalck, Edward (2019). De Graven van Vlaanderen (861-1384) [The Counts of Flanders (861-1384)] (in Dutch) (2nd ed.). DavidsFonds / Standaard uitgeverij. ISBN 9789002268458.
- Duckett, Eleanor Shippley (1969). Carolingian Portraits, a Study in the Ninth Century. University of Michigan Press, Ann Arbor, Michigan.
- Dümmler, Ernst (1925). Epistolae Karolini Aevi,. Monumenta Germaniae Historica: Epistolae. Berlin: Weidmann.
- Heidecker, Karl (2010). The Divorce of Lothar II: Christian Marriage and Political Power in the Carolingian World. Translated by Guest, Tanis M. Cornell University Press.
- Nicholas, David M (2013). Medieval Flanders. Routledge.
- Ugé, Karine (2005). Creating the Monastic Past in Medieval Flanders. York Medieval Press.
- Vanderputten, Steven, ed. (2024). Judith of West Francia, Carolingian Princess and First Countess of Flanders: Biographical Elements and Legacy. Turnhout: Brepols. doi:10.1484/M.STMH-EB.5.132281. ISBN 9782503604619.

New title Title created by Charles the Bald	Margrave of Flanders; 862–879	Succeeded by Baldwin II
