= Baldwin V of Flanders =

Count of Flanders from 1035 to 1067

Baldwin V
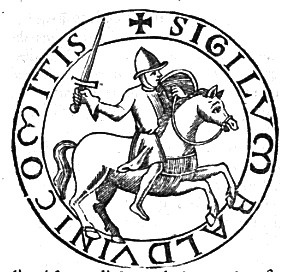
- Seal of Baldwin V

Count of Flanders
- Reign: 1035–1067
- Predecessor: Baldwin IV
- Successor: Baldwin VI

Regent of France
- Regency: 1060–1066
- Monarch: Philip I
- Co-regent: Anne of Kiev
- Born: 19 August 1012; Arras, Flanders
- Died: 1 September 1067 (aged 55); Lille, Flanders
- Spouse: Adela of France
- Issue: Baldwin VI, Count of Flanders; Matilda, Queen of England; Robert I, Count of Flanders
- House: Flanders
- Father: Baldwin IV, Count of Flanders
- Mother: Ogive of Luxembourg

Baldwin V (c. 19 August 1012– 1 September 1067) was Count of Flanders from 1035 until his death. He secured the personal union between the counties of Flanders and Hainaut and maintained close links to the English monarchy, which was overthrown by his son-in-law, William the Conqueror, near the end of his life.

== Family ==
Baldwin was the son of Baldwin IV of Flanders and Ogive of Luxembourg. In 1028 Baldwin married Adela of France, daughter of King Robert II of France, in Paris, in the presence of all the peers of the kingdom and five bishops. From her father she received as a dower all the income normally destined for the Corbie Abbey, which was one of the richest at the time. With Adela of France he had three children: Robert I, Baldwin VI and Matilda, who was married to William the Conqueror.

== Career ==
In 1030, two years after his marriage, Baldwin V rebelled against his father for unknown reasons. He received the support of the nobleman in Flanders and his father fled to the court of Robert I of Normandy. Robert intervened on behalf of the elder Baldwin and invaded Flanders with his army. He restored Baldwin IV to power and reconciled him with his son.

Around 1037, Baldwin V played host at Bruges to Emma of Normandy, the queen dowager of England, which was exiled during the struggle for the succession of her husband Cnut. In preparation of an invasion of England, her son Harthacnut came to Bruges with 10 ships in 1039. Harthacnut and Emma could peacefully return to England in 1040 when the English king Harold Harefoot died. In order to exonerate herself from several implicating actions during the succession struggle, Emma commanded the Encomium Emmae Reginae from the monastery of Saint Bertin at St Omer. This document described Bruges as a town full of merchants and diverse products.

During a long war (1046–1056) as an ally of Duke Godfrey III of Lower Lorraine against Emperor Henry III, Baldwin initially lost Valenciennes to Count Herman of Mons. However, when the latter died in 1049, Baldwin had his son, Baldwin VI, marry Herman's widow Richilde, and arranged that the children of her first marriage were disinherited, thus de facto uniting the County of Hainaut with Flanders. Upon the death of Henry III this marriage was acknowledged by treaty by Agnes of Poitou, mother and regent of Henry IV.

In 1049 Edward the Confessor threatened the Flemish coast with his fleet and forced Baldwin to accept a peace treaty with Henry. In return Baldwin gave in 1051 refuge to Godwin, Earl of Wessex, the banished political opponent of Edward, and three of his sons. One of these sons, Tostig Godwinson married Baldwin's half-sister Judith of Flanders. Baldwin gave Godwin a staging ground for his successful invasion of England in 1052, when Edward had to restore Godwin and his sons as earls.

From 1060 to 1067 Baldwin was the co-regent with Anne of Kiev for his nephew Philip I of France, indicating the importance he had acquired in international politics. As count of Flanders, Baldwin supported the king of France in most affairs, but he was also father-in-law to Duke William II of Normandy, who had married his daughter Matilda. Baldwin's half-sister had married Earl Godwin's third son Tostig. The half-Danish Godwinsons had spent their exile in Dublin, at a time William II of Normandy was fiercely defending his duchy. It is unlikely, however, that Baldwin intervened to prevent the duke's invasion plans of England, after the count had lost the conquered province of Ponthieu.

Baldwin died 1 September 1067.

== Bibliography ==
- De Maesschalck, Edward (2019). De Graven van Vlaanderen (861-1384) [The Counts of Flanders (861-1384)] (in Dutch) (2nd ed.). DavidsFonds / Standaard uitgeverij. ISBN 9789002268458.
- Fleming, Alexander; Mason, Roger (2019). Scotland and the Flemish People. John Donald. ISBN 9781788851466.
- Frans J. Van Droogenbroeck, De markenruil Ename – Valenciennes en de investituur van de graaf van Vlaanderen in de mark Ename, Handelingen van de Geschied- en Oudheidkundige Kring van Oudenaarde 55 (2018) S. 47-127
- Oksanen, Eljas (2012). Flanders and the Anglo-Norman World, 1066-1216. Cambridge University Press.
- Roach, Levi (2022). De Normandiërs [Empire of the Normans] (in Dutch). Amsterdam: Anthos. ISBN 978-90-263-5231-7.
- Sir Bernard Burke (1814–1892), "Royal Descents and Pedigrees of Founders’ Kin", published by London, Harrison (Bookseller to the Queen), 1858, modern publishers Kessinger Publishing, Forgotten Books, and Franklin Classics with ISBNs around 9781166195335, 9781527852457, or 9780342362868 (depending on the version).

Baldwin V of Flanders House of Flanders Born: 19 August 1012 Died: 1 September 1067
Preceded by Baldwin IV	Count of Flanders; 1035–1067	Succeeded by Baldwin VI
