= Baldwin III of Hainaut =

Count of Hainaut (1088–1120)

Baldwin III
- Born: 1088
- Died: 1120 (aged 31–32)
- Buried: Mons, Belgium
- Noble family: House of Flanders
- Spouse: Yolande of Guelder
- Issue: Baldwin IV, Count of Hainaut
- Father: Baldwin II, Count of Hainaut
- Mother: Ida of Louvain

Baldwin III (1088–1120) was count of Hainaut from 1098 to his death.

== History ==
Baldwin was son of Count Baldwin II of Hainaut and Ida of Louvain. He succeeded to the County of Hainaut in 1102. Baldwin married Yolande of Guelders at a young age. He had been betrothed to Adelaide of Maurienne, a niece of Countess Clemence of Flanders. The broken betrothal caused a scandal, and Countess Clemence brought the issue before her brother Pope Calixtus II. The pope declared that the marriage was legal and could not be dissolved.

Baldwin died at a young age of c. 33 in 1120, and was buried in Mons, Belgium. His eldest son, Baldwin IV, succeeded him. His younger son Gerard inherited the counties of Dodewaard and Dale, which had been in the possession of his mother. Countess Yolande held Hainaut as her dower for a while and as a regent for her son.

== Family ==
He was married to Yolande, daughter of Count Gerard I of Guelders. Their children were:

1. Baldwin IV, Count of Hainaut, married Alice of Namur
2. Gerhard of Hainaut, ancestor of the Counts of Dale
3. Gertrude/Ida of Hainaut, married before 9 August 1138 to Roger III of Tosny of Conches and Flamstead
4. Richildis of Hainaut, married: 1) Thierry d’Avesnes; 2) Everard II Radulf, castellan of Tournai

After Baldwin's death, Countess Yolande married c.1120 Godfrey II, lord of Ribemont and Bouchain, castellan of Valenciennes and the son of Anselm of Ribemont. Yolande and Godfrey II had two children:

- Godfrey III, castellan of Valenciennes
- Berthe of Valenciennes, who married 1) Count Otto II of Duras and 2) Guy de Saint-Aubert

== See also ==
- Counts of Hainaut family tree

== Footnotes ==
Baldwin III of Hainaut House of Flanders Born: 1088 Died: 1120
Regnal titles
Preceded by Baldwin II	Count of Hainaut; 1098–1120	Succeeded by Baldwin IV
