= Ida, Countess of Hainaut =

Ida, Countess of Hainaut (Ida of Louvain) (b. 1063, d. 1139), daughter of Henry II, Count of Louvain, and Adela of Thuringia. Ida was sister to Godfrey I, Count of Louvain.

Ida was married to Baldwin II, Count of Hainaut, who served in the First Crusade with Godfrey of Bouillon. Ida and Baldwin had:

- Baldwin III, Count of Hainaut
- Louis (fl. 1096)
- Simon, a canon in Liege
- Henry (fl. 1096)
- Willem (d. after 1117)
- Arnould
- Ida (d. after 1101), married first Guy de Chievres and second Thomas, Lord of Coucy
- Richilde (d. after 1118), married Amaury III de Montfort, and, repudiated, became a nun at Mauberge
- Aelidis (d. 1153), married Nicolas II de Rumigny

Ida's husband, Baldwin, sold some of his property to the Bishopric of Liège in order to take the cross in the First Crusade. In 1098 he was sent to Constantinople with Hugh of Vermandois after the Siege of Antioch, to seek assistance from the Byzantine emperor. He disappeared during a raid by the Seljuk Turks in Anatolia, and was presumably killed.

While on a pilgrimage to Jerusalem in 1106, Ida organized a search for her lost husband in Anatolia but to no avail. Ida's fate remains unknown.

== Sources ==
- Gislebertus (of Mons) (2005). Chronicle of Hainaut. Translated by Napran, Laura. The Boydell Press.
- Riley-Smith, Jonathan (1997). The First Crusaders, 1095–1131. Cambridge University Press.
