= Count of Flanders =

Ruler or sub-ruler of the county of Flanders

Coat of arms of the counts of Flanders.

The Count of Flanders was the ruler or sub-ruler of the county of Flanders, beginning in the 9th century. Later, the title would be held for a time, by the rulers of the Holy Roman Empire and Spain. In 1790, the ruler and his title ceased to exist when the county was annexed to France during the French Revolution. In the 19th century, the title was appropriated by Belgium and granted twice to younger sons of Belgian kings. The most recent holder died in 1983.

In 862 Baldwin I was appointed as the first Margrave of Flanders by French King Charles II. It was a military appointment, responsible for repelling the Viking raids from the coast of Francia. The title of margrave (or marquis) evolved into that of count. Arnulf I was the first to name himself as count, by the Grace of God. The title of margrave largely fell out of use by the 12th century. Since then, the rulers of Flanders have only been referred to as counts.

The counts of Flanders enlarged their estate through a series of diplomatic marriages. The counties of Hainaut, Namur, Béthune, Nevers, Auxerre, Rethel, Burgundy, and Artois were all acquired in this manner. However, the County of Flanders suffered the same fate in turn. As a result of the marriage of Countess Margaret III with Philip II, Duke of Burgundy, the county and the subsidiary counties entered a personal union with the Duchy of Burgundy in 1405.

The counts of Flanders were also associated with the Duchy of Brittany prior to its union with France. In c. 1323, Joan, the daughter of Arthur II, Duke of Brittany, married the second son of Count Robert III. Joanna of Flanders, the granddaughter of Count Robert III and daughter of his son, Count Louis I, married John Montfort. During Montfort's imprisonment, she fought on his behalf, alongside English allies, during the Breton War of Succession for the ducal crown, which was won definitively by her son John V, Duke of Brittany. It was through this alliance that the Duchy of Brittany was eventually joined to the throne of France.

== List of counts ==
=== House of Flanders ===
Name	Lifespan	Reign	Consorts	Succession
Baldwin I	c. 830s – 879	862 – 879	Judith of Flanders c. 861; 4 children	Married Judith, daughter of Charles the Bald
Baldwin II	c. 865 – 10 September 918	879 – 10 September 918	Ælfthryth c. 893; 4 children	Son of Baldwin I and Judith
Arnulf I	c. 893/899 – 27 March 964	10 September 918 – 27 March 964	Adele of Vermandois; 934; 5 children	Son of Baldwin II
Baldwin III	c. 940 – c. 962	958-962	Matilda of Saxony c. 961; 1 son	Ruled jointly with his father Arnulf I
Arnulf II	c. 961 – 30 March 987	965 – 30 March 987	Rozala of Italy; 976; 2 children	Son of Baldwin III
Baldwin IV	980 – 30 May 1035	988 – 30 May 1035	(1) Ogive of Luxembourg; 1012; 1 son (2) Eleanor of Normandy; 1031; 1 daughter	Son of Arnulf II
Baldwin V	19 August 1012 – 1 September 1067	30 May 1035 – 1 September 1067	Adela of France; 1028; 3 children	Son of Baldwin IV
Baldwin VI	c. 1030 – 17 July 1070	1 September 1067 – 17 July 1070	Richilde, Countess of Hainaut c. 1050; 2 sons	Son of Baldwin V; also Count of Hainaut
Arnulf III	c. 1055 – 22 February 1071	17 July 1070 – 22 February 1071	Never married	Son of Baldwin VI; also Count of Hainaut
Robert I	c. 1035 – 13 October 1093	22 February 1071 – 13 October 1093	Gertrude of Saxony; 1063; 5 children	Son of Baldwin V
Robert II	c. 1065 – 5 October 1111	13 October 1093 – 5 October 1111	Clementia of Burgundy; 1097; 1 son	Son of Robert I
Baldwin VII	1093 – 17 July 1119	5 October 1111 – 17 July 1119	Hawise of Brittany; 1105 no issue	Son of Robert II

=== House of Estridsen ===
Portrait	Name	Lifespan	Reign	Consorts	Succession
	Charles I	1084 – 2 March 1127	1119 – 2 March 1127	Margaret of Clermont c. 1118 no issue	Son of Canute IV of Denmark and Adela of Flanders, cousin of Baldwin VII and designated by him. Also grandson of Robert I.

=== House of Normandy ===
Portrait	Name	Lifespan	Reign	Consorts	Succession
	William I	25 October 1102 – 28 July 1128	2 March 1127 – 28 July 1128	(1) Sibylla of Anjou c. 1123 no issue (2) Joanna of Montferrat c. 1127 no issue	Great-grandson of Baldwin V, designated by Louis VI of France

=== House of Alsace or House of Metz ===
Portrait	Name	Lifespan	Reign	Consorts	Succession
	Theoderic	c. 1099 – 17 January 1168	28 July 1128 – 17 January 1168	(1) Margaret of Clermont (or Swanhilde) before 1132; 1 daughter (2) Sibylla of Anjou c. 1134; 6 children	Grandson of Robert I, recognised by Louis VI of France
	Philip I	1143 – 1 August 1191	17 January 1168 – 1 August 1191	(1) Elisabeth of Vermandois; 1159 no issue (2) Theresa of Portugal c. 1183 no issue	Son of Thierry; also Count of Vermandois
	Margaret I	c. 1145 - 15 November 1194	1 August 1191 - 15 November 1194	(1) Ralph II of Vermandois; 1160 no issue (2) Baldwin V, Count of Hainaut c. 1169; 8 children	Daughter of Thierry

=== House of Flanders ===
Portrait	Name	Lifespan	Reign	Consorts	Succession
	Baldwin VIII	1150 – 17 December 1195	1 August 1191 - 17 December 1194	Margaret I c. 1169; 8 children	Husband of Margaret I
	Baldwin IX	July 1172 – c. 1205	1194 - 1205	Marie of Champagne; 6 January 1186; Valenciennes; 2 daughters	Son of Margaret I and Baldwin VIII, also Latin Emperor of Constantinople
	Joan	c. 1199 – 5 December 1244	1205 – 5 December 1244 (sole-rule between 1214 and 1223)	(1) Ferdinand of Portugal; 1212; Paris no issue (2) Thomas of Savoy-Piedmont; 2 April 1237 no issue	Daughter of Baldwin IX
	Ferdinand	24 March 1188 – 27 July 1233	1212 – 27 July 1233	Joan, Countess of Flanders; 1212; Paris no issue	Husband of Joan
	Thomas	c. 1199 – 7 February 1259	2 April 1237 – 5 December 1244	Joan, Countess of Flanders; 2 April 1237 no issue	Husband of Joan
	Margaret II	1202 – 10 February 1280	5 December 1244 – 29 December 1278	(1) Bouchard IV of Avesnes c. 23 July 1212; 3 sons (2) William II of Dampierre; 18 August/15 November 1223; 5 children	Sister of Joan

In 1244, the Counties of Flanders and Hainaut were claimed by Margaret II's sons, the half-brothers John I of Avesnes and William III of Dampierre in the War of the Succession of Flanders and Hainault. In 1246, King Louis IX of France awarded Flanders to William.

=== House of Dampierre ===
Portrait	Name	Lifespan	Reign	Consorts	Succession
	William II	1224 – 6 June 1251	1247 - 6 June 1251	Beatrice of Brabant; November 1247 no issue	Son of Margaret II and William II of Dampierre
	Guy	c. 1226 – 7 March 1305	6 June 1251 - 7 March 1305	(1) Matilda of Béthune; June 1246; 8 children (2) Isabelle of Luxembourg; March 1265; 8 children	Brother of William II
	Robert III	1249 – 17 September 1322	7 March 1305 – 17 September 1322	(1) Blanche of Sicily; 1265; 1 son (died young) (2) Yolande II, Countess of Nevers c. 1271; 5 children	Son of Guy: also Count of Nevers
	Louis I	c. 1304 – 26 August 1346	17 September 1322 – 26 August 1346	Margaret I, Countess of Burgundy; 1320; 1 son	Grandson of Robert III
	Louis II	25 October 1330 – 30 January 1384	26 August 1346 – 30 January 1384	Margaret of Brabant; 1347; 1 daughter	Son of Louis I; also Count of Burgundy
	Margaret III	13 April 1350 – 16 March 1405	30 January 1384 – 16 March 1405	(1) Philip I, Duke of Burgundy; 1355 no issue (2) Philip II, Duke of Burgundy; 19 June 1369; 9 children	Daughter of Louis II

=== House of Burgundy ===
Portrait	Name	Lifespan	Reign	Consorts	Succession
	Philip II	17 January 1342 – 27 April 1404	30 January 1384 – 27 April 1404	Margaret III; 19 June 1369; 9 children	Husband of Margaret III; also Duke of Burgundy
	John	28 May 1371 – 10 September 1419	27 April 1404 – 10 September 1419	Margaret of Bavaria; 12 April 1385; Cambrai; 8 children	Son of Philip II and Margaret III
	Philip III	31 July 1396 – 15 June 1467	10 September 1419 – 15 June 1467	(1) Michelle of Valois; June 1409; 1 daughter (died young) (2) Bonne of Artois; 30 November 1424; Moulins-les-Engelbert no issue (3) Isabella of Portugal; 7 January 1430; 3 sons 18 illegitimate children	Son of John
	Charles II	10 November 1433 – 5 January 1477	15 June 1467 – 5 January 1477	(1) Catherine of France; 19 May 1440; Blois no issue (2) Isabella of Bourbon; 30 October 1454; Lille; 1 daughter (3) Margaret of York; 3 July 1468; Damme no issue	Son of Philip III
	Mary	13 February 1457 – 27 March 1482	5 January 1477 – 27 March 1482	Maximilian I, Holy Roman Emperor; 19 August 1477; Ghent; 3 children	Daughter of Charles II

=== House of Habsburg ===
Portrait	Name	Lifespan	Reign	Consorts	Succession
	Maximilian I	22 March 1459 – 12 January 1519	19 August 1477 – 27 March 1482	(1) Mary of Burgundy; 19 August 1477; Ghent; 3 children (2) Anne, Duchess of Brittany; 19 December 1490; Rennes Cathedral no issue (3) Bianca Maria Sforza; 16 March 1494; Hall in Tirol no issue	Husband of Mary
	Philip IV	22 July 1478 – 25 September 1506	27 March 1482 – 25 September 1506	Joanna of Castile (Joan the Mad); 20 October 1496; Lier; 6 children	Son of Mary and Maximilian I, known as Philip the Fair
	Charles III	24 February 1500 – 21 September 1558	25 September 1506 – 25 October 1555	Isabella of Portugal; 10 March 1526; Alcázar Palace; 7 children	Son of Philip IV, also King of Spain as Charles I, titular Duke of Burgundy and Count of Flanders, Holland and Zeeland, Holy Roman Emperor as Charles V

Charles V proclaimed the Pragmatic Sanction of 1549 eternally uniting Flanders with the other lordships of the Low Countries in a personal union. When the Habsburg empire was divided among the heirs of Charles V, the Low Countries, including Flanders, went to Philip II of Spain, of the Spanish branch of the House of Habsburg.

Portrait	Name	Lifespan	Reign	Consorts	Succession
	Philip V	21 May 1527 – 13 September 1598	16 January 1556 – 6 May 1598	(1) Maria Manuela of Portugal; 12 November 1543; Salamanca; 1 son (2) Mary I of England; 25 July 1554; Winchester Cathedral no issue (3) Elisabeth of Valois; 1559; Guadalajara; 2 daughters (4) Anna of Austria; May 1570; 5 children	Son of Charles III (Holy Roman Emperor Charles V), also King of Spain as Philip II
	Isabella Clara Eugenia	12 August 1566 – 1 December 1633	6 May 1598 – 13 July 1621	Albert VII, Archduke of Austria; 18 April 1599; Valencia no issue	Daughter of Philip V; ruled jointly with her husband Albert VII, Archduke of Austria
	Albert	13 November 1559 – 13 July 1621	6 May 1598 – 13 July 1621	Isabella Clara Eugenia; 18 April 1599; Valencia no issue	Husband of Isabella Clara Eugenia
	Philip VI	8 April 1605 – 17 September 1665	13 July 1621 – 17 September 1665	(1) Elisabeth of France; 18 October 1615; Bordeaux; 8 children (2) Mariana of Austria; 7 October 1649; Navalcarnero; 5 children	Grandson of Philip V
	Charles IV	6 November 1661 – 1 November 1700	17 September 1665 – 1 November 1700	(1) Marie Louise d'Orléans; 19 November 1679; Quintanapalla no issue (2) Maria Anna of Neuburg; 14 May 1690; Valladolid no issue	Son of Philip VI

=== House of Bourbon ===
Portrait	Name	Lifespan	Reign	Consorts	Succession
	Philip VII	19 December 1683 – 9 July 1746	1 November 1700 – 14 March 1713	(1) Maria Luisa of Savoy; 2 November 1701; 4 sons (2) Elisabeth Farnese; 16 September 1714; Parma; 6 children	Great-grandson of Philip VI

Between 1706 and 1714, Flanders was invaded by the English and the Dutch during the War of the Spanish Succession. The fief was claimed by the House of Habsburg and the House of Bourbon. In 1713, the Treaty of Utrecht settled the succession and the County of Flanders went to the Austrian branch of the House of Habsburg.

=== House of Habsburg ===
Portrait	Name	Lifespan	Reign	Consorts	Succession
	Charles V	1 October 1685 – 20 October 1740	7 September 1714 – 20 October 1740	Elisabeth Christine of Brunswick-Wolfenbüttel; 1 August 1708; Santa Maria del Mar; 4 children	Great-grandson of Philip III, also Holy Roman Emperor
	Maria Theresa	13 May 1717 – 29 November 1780	20 October 1740 – 29 November 1780	Francis I, Holy Roman Emperor; 12 February 1736; Augustinian Church, Vienna; 16 children	Daughter of Charles V, jointly with Francis I, Holy Roman Emperor
	Francis I	8 December 1708 – 18 August 1765	21 November 1740 – 18 August 1765	Maria Theresa; 12 February 1736; Augustinian Church, Vienna; 16 children	Husband of Maria Theresa
	Joseph	13 March 1741 – 20 February 1790	18 August 1765 – 20 February 1790	(1) Isabella of Parma; October 1760; Vienna; 5 children (died young) (2) Maria Josepha of Bavaria; 25 January 1765; Schönbrunn Palace no issue	Son of Maria Theresa and Francis I
	Leopold	5 May 1747 – 1 March 1792	20 February 1790 – 1 March 1792	Maria Luisa of Spain; 16 February 1764; Madrid; 16 children	Brother of Joseph
	Francis II	12 February 1768 – 2 March 1835	1 March 1792 – 17 October 1797	(1) Elisabeth of Württemberg; 6 January 1788; Vienna; 1 daughter (died young) (2) Maria Theresa of Naples and Sicily; 15 September 1790; 12 children (3) Maria Ludovika of Austria-Este; 6 January 1808 no issue (4) Caroline Augusta of Bavaria; 29 October 1816 no issue	Son of Leopold

The title was abolished de facto after revolutionary France annexed Flanders in 1795. Emperor Francis II relinquished his claim to the Low Countries in the Treaty of Campo Formio of 1797, and the area remained part of France until the end of the Napoleonic Wars.

== Modern usage ==
=== House of Belgium (formerly House of Saxe-Coburg and Gotha) ===
In modern times, the title was granted to two younger sons of the kings of the Belgians.

- Prince Philippe, son of King Leopold I of Belgium (1840–1905)
- Prince Charles, son of King Albert I of Belgium (1910–1983)

The title of Count of Flanders has not been abolished, but the Royal Decree of 16 October 2001 adjusting and limiting the usage of the titles of Count of Hainault and Duke of Brabant strongly implies it will not be used again.

=== House of Bourbon ===
The title Count of Flanders is one of the titles of the Spanish Crown. It is a historical title which is only nominally and ceremonially used.
