= Baldwin VI of Flanders =

Count of Hainaut (1051–1070) and Flanders (1067–1070)

Baldwin VI

Count of Flanders
- Reign: 1067–1070
- Predecessor: Baldwin V
- Successor: Arnulf III

Count of Hainaut
- Reign: 1051–1070
- Predecessor: Richilde
- Successor: Baldwin II
- Co-count: Richilde
- Born: c. 1030
- Died: 17 July 1070
- Spouse: Richilde, Countess of Hainaut
- Issue: Arnulf III, Count of Flanders; Baldwin II, Count of Hainaut
- House: Flanders
- Father: Baldwin V, Count of Flanders
- Mother: Adela of France

Baldwin VI (c. 1030 – 17 July 1070), also known as Baldwin the Good, was the count of Flanders from 1067 to 1070 and count of Hainaut from 1051 to 1070 as Baldwin I.

== Life ==
Baldwin was the eldest son of Baldwin V of Flanders and Adela of France. After he suffered from a serious illness as a child, he was left with a weak health. As part of the plans of his father to expand the county of Flanders eastwards, into the Holy Roman Empire, Baldwin married at Easter 1051 with Richilde, the widow of Herman of Mons and heir of Hainaut. This enraged Emperor Henry III, who had not been consulted. At his instigation the bishop of Cambrai put a ban on the marriage because the marriage violated the rules of consanguinity, but Richilde was able to lift that ban through her uncle Pope Leo IX. When another vassal of Henry, the prince-bishop of Liège reinstated the ban, the Baldwins invaded his land in 1053 and destroyed the cities of Thuin and Huy. In reaction, Henry invaded the county of Flanders in 1054, and laid waste to the regions of Cambrai, Valenciennes and Douai. His siege of Lille and Tournai was unsuccessful and his campaign failed.

The next year, the Baldwins allied with Godfrey the Bearded and went on the offensive again. They laid siege to the fortress of Antwerp. Baldwin V led the Flemish fleet on the river Scheldt, whilst his son was in charge of the troops on land. This campaign ended in failure when Baldwin VI was severely wounded and never fully recovered. The conflict with the German emperor ended when Henry died in October 1056. His successor accepted Baldwin VI as vassal for the county of Hainaut and Baldwin V remained his vassal for what was called Imperial Flanders, all lands to the West of the river Scheldt.

Baldwin V did not want to split his possessions and titles between his two sons, but wanted his oldest sun to inherit everything. For this reason he had his youngest son Robert take an oath to never claim the county of Flanders. On the death of his father in 1067, Baldwin became both count of Flanders and count of Hainaut, realizing the dream of his father to unite both counties in a personal union.

During his short reign, Baldwin VI took care to reinforce the border with the Roman Empire by erecting the town of Geraardsbergen.

== Death ==
Suffering from ill health and fearing he might die soon, in 1070 Baldwin summoned his brother Robert to Bruges and had him to repeat his oath in St. Donatian's Church on all the relics of the church and before all the gathered nobleman of Flanders, that he would not put a claim to the succession of the count of Flanders. Baldwin VI died soon after, on 17 July 1070 in Bruges. Baldwin was buried at Hasnon Abbey, where he had constructed the church of St. Peter's.

His early death left Flanders and Hainaut in the hands of his young son, Arnulf III, with Richilde as regent. Arnulf III was killed at the Battle of Cassel in 1071. Baldwin VI's younger son, Count Baldwin II of Hainaut, could not claim Flanders from Baldwin VI's brother, Robert I.

== See also ==
- Counts of Flanders family tree
- Counts of Hainaut family tree

== Bibliography ==
- De Maesschalck, Edward (2019). De Graven van Vlaanderen (861-1384) [The Counts of Flanders (861-1384)] (in Dutch) (2nd ed.). DavidsFonds / Standaard uitgeverij. ISBN 9789002268458.
- Napran, Laura (2005). Gilbert of Mons, Chronicle of Hainaut. Woodbridge: The Boydell Press. ISBN 1843831201.
- Nip, Renée (1999). Harper-Bill, Christopher (ed.). The Political Relations Between England and Flanders (1066–1128). Anglo-Norman Studies. Vol. 21 : Proceedings of the Battle Conference 1998. Woodbridge: The Boydell Press.
- "Stad Geraardsbergen - Geschiedenis van de stad Geraardsbergen" [City of Geraardsbergen - history of the city of Geraardsbergen]. Geraardsbergen (in Dutch). Archived from the original on 6 July 2011.

Baldwin VI of Flanders House of Flanders Born: c. 1030 Died: 17 July 1070
Preceded by Baldwin V	Count of Flanders; 1067–1070	Succeeded by Arnulf I/III
Preceded by Herman	Count of Mons; 1051–1070	Succeeded by Arnulf I/III
Preceded by Richilde	Count of Hainaut; 1051–1070	Succeeded by Arnulf I/III
Preceded by Godfrey III	Margrave of Antwerp; 1069–1070	Succeeded by Godfrey IV
