= Robert I of Flanders =

Count of Flanders from 1071 to 1093

Robert I
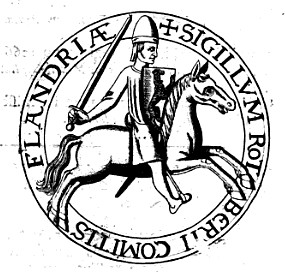
- Seal of Robert I

Count of Flanders
- Reign: 1071–1093
- Predecessor: Arnulf III
- Successor: Robert II
- Born: c. 1035
- Died: 13 October 1093 (aged 57–58)
- Spouse: Gertrude of Saxony
- Issue: Robert II, Count of Flanders; Adela; Gertrude
- House: House of Flanders
- Father: Baldwin V of Flanders
- Mother: ?

Robert I (c. 1035 – 13 October 1093), known as Robert the Frisian, was count of Flanders from 1071 until his death in 1093. He was a son of Count Baldwin V out of his first marriage, He was the older brother of Count Baldwin VI and claimed the countship after defeating his nephew Arnulf III and his allies, which included King Philip I of France, Count Eustace II of Boulogne and the counts of Saint-Pol and Ardres at the Battle of Cassel. He subsequently made peace with Philip, who became his stepson-in-law, but remained hostile to his sister Matilda and her husband William the Conqueror, who was king of England and duke of Normandy.

== Early life ==
Robert was the older son of Baldwin V of Flanders and an unknown wife. His younger brother, Baldwin VI, succeeded their father as count of Flanders in 1067. His sister Matilda married in 1051/2 William the Conqueror, duke of Normandy and later king of England.

== Regent of West-Frisia ==
Robert's marriage to Gertrude of Saxony, dowager countess of West-Frisia, in 1063 was not arranged by his father but nonetheless agreed to. His nickname 'the Frisian' was obtained, apparently, when he acted as regent for his stepson, Count Dirk V of West-Frisia Robert and Gertrude had six children: Robert, who became count of Flanders, Adela († 1115), who became queen of Denmark, Gertrude, who became duchess of Lorraine, Philip, Ogiva, who became abbess of Messines, and Baldwin († bef. 1080).

Robert twice swore a renunciation to his claims to Flanders. The first was at Audenarde (between 1063 and 1067), in the presence of his father Baldwin V. He received a significant monetary compensation. The second was made at Bruges (1069/70) in the presence of his brother Baldwin VI.

On his deathbed in 1070, Baldwin VI left Flanders and Hainaut to his elder son, Arnulf III, (Note: The version of Gislebert of Mons, according to which Baldwin partitioned his inheritance, leaving Flanders to Arnulf and Hainaut to his younger son Baldwin, is not corroborated by charter evidence. The same is true for Ghislebert's claim that Baldwin VI further entrusted Robert, his brother, with the safeguard of Arnulf III.) while Richilde, Arnulf's mother, was to be regent until Arnulf came of age.

== Count of Flanders ==
Despite the oath, Robert disputed the succession of his nephew Arnulf III upon Baldwin VI's death. He recruited supporters in the Maritime Flanders and Ghent, and finally entered the latter with the intent of taking Flanders for himself. Richilde appealed to King Philip I of France who summoned Robert to appear before him. Robert refused and continued his war with Richilde at which point Philip I amassed an army which he brought to Flanders. Among his allies were the counts of Boulogne, Saint-Pol and Ardres. His army was also accompanied by Norman troops, probably sent by Robert's sister, Queen Matilda, and led by William FitzOsborn. (Note: FitzOsborn's motives for being at the battle of Cassel vary considerably depending on which chronicler one reads. Robert of Torigni states he went at the request of Queen Matilda, William of Malmesbury claims he was in love with Richilde while William of Jumièges says he went on his own accord. Heather Tanner (Families, Friends, and Allies: Boulogne and Politics in Northern France and England c.879–1160 (Brill, 2004), pp. 103–4 & Esp. n. 138) comments that FitzOsborn was one of William the Conqueror's advisors who would not likely leave England without the king's consent, making Robert of Torigni's explanation the more likely. The Conqueror was Arnulf III's uncle so his, or Queen Matilda's, sending a Norman contingent would make sense. However, both Orderic Vitalis and Robert de Torigni mention that he was accompanied by a very small contingent (ten knights according to Orderic), making some scholars infer that FitzOsborn went to fulfill King William's feudal obligations to Phillip.)

Both forces did battle on Cassel on 22 February 1071. King Philip fled together with Godfrey, bishop of Paris; both Robert and Richilde were captured but Robert was ultimately victorious. Among the dead were Arnulf III (according to some sources killed by Gerbod the Fleming, 1st Earl of Chester) and William FitzOsborn. As a result of the battle Robert claimed the countship of Flanders, and Richilde's son Baldwin became count of Hainaut, where he continued to instigate hostilities against Robert.

King Philip gathered some forces at Montreuil-sur-Mer, invaded Flanders and burned the town of Saint-Omer. However, Count Robert eventually negotiated a peace agreement, later consolidated by the marriage of his stepdaughter Bertha of West-Frisia to the king. As a part of their negotiations Corbie, an important trade center, which had been ceded by Arnulf III in order to secure the king's help, was returned to royal control. From then on, and until the repudiation of Bertha in 1092 (in order for King Philip I to marry Bertrade of Montfort), Flanders and France remained in very friendly terms, both of them having the new Anglo-Norman realm as a main enemy.

After the battle of Cassel, Richilde and Baldwin continued the war against Robert. To obtain funds, they enfeoffed Hainaut to the bishopric of Liege and counted with the support of Godfrey IV, Duke of Lower Lorraine. Close to forest of Broqueroye, Robert inflicted heavy losses on the forces of Hainaut. Later, Baldwin obtained a victory at Wavrechain. After this, the war with Hainaut ended, with Robert as the unchallenged ruler of Flanders.

Flanders became a refuge for William the Conqueror's enemies, including Edgar Ætheling in 1075 and William's rebellious son Robert Curthose in 1078/79. (Note: The relationships between England and Flanders, and between Normandy and Flanders prior to 1066 are complex and the fact that Flanders harbored fugitives from both England and Normandy did not improve the situation, yet they were not always unfriendly either; there were certainly conflicting loyalties. See: Lesley Abrams, 'England, Normandy and Scandinavia', Companion to the Anglo-Norman World, Ed. C. Harper-Bill, E. van Houts (Boydell Press, 2002), 43–62. Philip Grierson contended (in his 'Relations between England and Flanders...' TRHS, XXIII (1941) 71–113) that there were no close relationships between England and Flanders prior to the Norman Conquest. Renée Nip (in Political Relations Between England and Flanders, Anglo-Norman Studies 21 (1999), 145–168) adds that the Norman Conquest of England, even though many Flemings participated and the fact a marriage alliance between Normandy and Flanders existed, did not improve relationships between England and Flanders. Later commercial interests would change the situation significantly. See also, David Bates, Normandy and its Neighbours, 900–1250: Essays for David Bates, Ed. David Crouch, Kathleen Thompson (Brepols, 2011).) In 1075, Robert let the Danish fleet of king Sweyn II of Denmark use Flanders harbors in their intended expedition against England. In 1080, Robert married his daughter Adela to Canute IV of Denmark on his accession to the throne. In 1085 Robert and Canute planned a massive naval attack on England. The threat was big enough for William to hire mercenaries and lay waste to some coastal districts in order to hamper the supply trains of the invading army. However, the rebellion of Canute's brother Olaf delayed the expedition, and finally Canute's assassination put a definitive end to the plan.

Even before becoming count of Flanders, Robert was engaged in continued hostilities in West-Frisia, defending the rights of his stepson Dirk V against Godfrey IV and William I, bishop of Utrecht. In 1076, the deaths of Godfrey at Vlaardingen and later of William, allowed Robert and Dirk to go on the offensive. They won an important battle at Yselmond, even capturing the new bishop, Conrad. The victory changed the course of the hostilities, allowing Dirk and future counts to reconquer the territories of the county of West-Frisia they had lost in the past.

== Relationship with the Church ==
The relationship between Robert and Pope Gregory VII was marked by the conflict between the latter and the bishops of Therouanne. Since Robert did not take action against bishop Drogo, he was excommunicated (around 1077) by bishop Raynard of Langres and papal legate Hubert. Gregory was not pleased with the excommunication, since he could not afford another enemy in his conflict with Henry IV. He instructed his legate Hugh of Die to investigate the matter and lift the excommunication if it had been not canonical. The excommunication was probably lifted at some point after September 1079. Trouble continued under Drogo's successors, Hubert and Lambert, as Robert refused to intervene against them. Gregory threatened Robert with a new excommunication, but the threat was not carried out.

During the papacy of Urban II the Flemish clergy complained about the exactions imposed by Robert at a provincial council in Rheims (around 1092). A delegation composed of Arnulf (provost of Saint Omer), Jean (abbot of Saint Bertin), Gerard (abbot of Ham) and Bernard (provost of Watten) threatened Robert with an interdict in case the exactions did not end. Robert complied and returned the goods he had confiscated.

== Later years and pilgrimage to Jerusalem ==
Taking a considerable armed escort Robert the Frisian made a pilgrimage to Jerusalem in 1086 and on the return trip home spent time assisting the Byzantine Emperor Alexios I Komnenos against the Seljuq Turks. In one battle Robert and three of his companions rode ahead of the main army charging the forces under the command of Kerbogha, whose forces the Christians scattered completely. Robert died 13 October 1093.

== Notes ==
Preceded by Arnulf III	Count of Flanders; 1071–1093	Succeeded by Robert II
