= Arnulf III of Flanders =

Count of Flanders from 1070 to 1071

Arnulf III
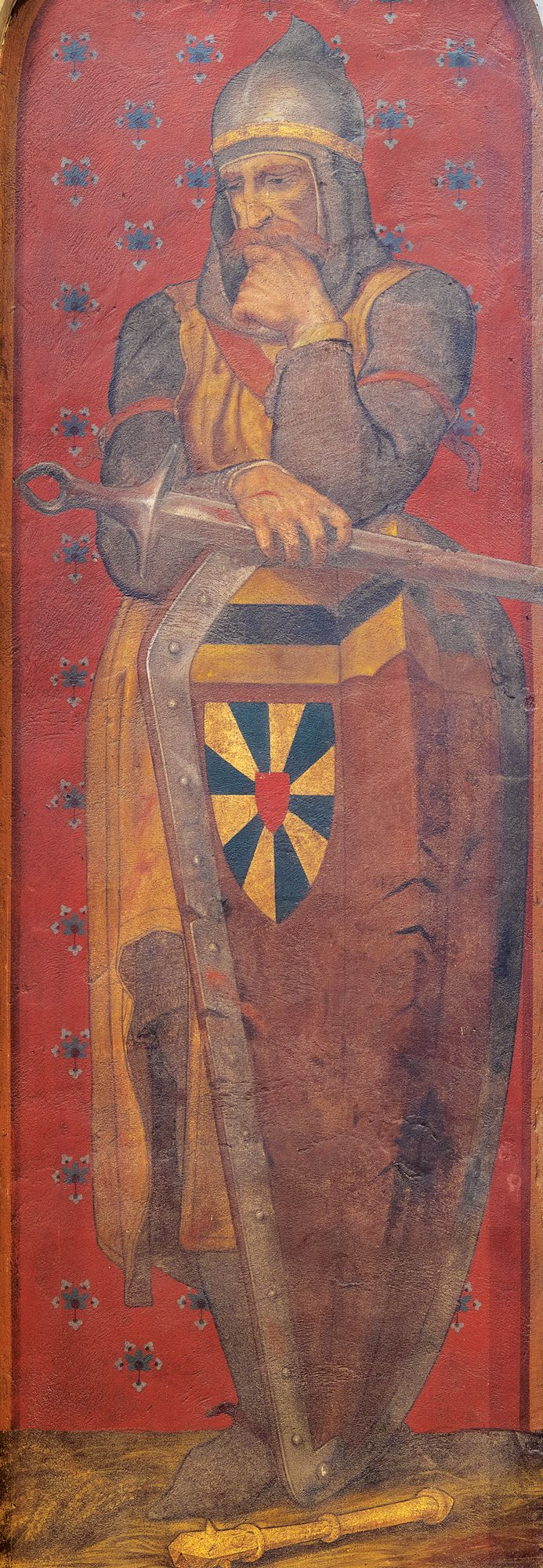
- Depiction of Arnulf III in the Gravenkapel by Julien Van der Plaetsen, c. 1372-1373

Count of Flanders
- Reign: 1070-1071
- Predecessor: Baldwin VI
- Successor: Robert I
- Regent: Richilde, Countess of Hainaut
- Born: c. 1055
- Died: 1071; Battle of Cassel
- House: House of Flanders
- Father: Baldwin VI, Count of Flanders
- Mother: Richilde, Countess of Mons and Hainaut

Arnulf III (died 22 February 1071) was Count of Flanders from 1070 until his death at the Battle of Cassel in 1071.

== Biography ==
Born c. 1055, Arnulf was the eldest son of Count Baldwin VI of Flanders and Countess Richilde of Hainaut. On his deathbed in 1070, Baldwin left Flanders to his elder son, Arnulf, and Hainaut to the younger son, Baldwin, with the provision that if either preceded the other in death, he would inherit the other's county as well. Baldwin VI further entrusted his brother Robert with the safeguard of his son Arnulf, who was still a minor, to which Robert gave his oath of homage and solemn promise to protect his nephew. Richilde was to be regent in Flanders until Arnulf came of age.

After his father's death in 1070, his uncle Robert broke his oath and disputed the succession. Richilde appealed to King Philip I of France, who summoned Robert to appear before him. Robert refused and continued his aggression against Richilde and Arnulf, at which point Philip amassed an army which he brought to Flanders. The French army was accompanied by Norman troops, probably sent by Baldwin and Robert's sister Queen Matilda and led by William FitzOsborn. Also allied to Arnulf III was Count Eustace II of Boulogne who raised considerable support for the young count and his mother. The two forces met at the Battle of Cassel on 22 February 1071. In that engagement Robert's forces were ultimately victorious (Note: The outcome of the battle itself was not a clear victory for either side, but the fact that Arnulf was killed during the battle led to Robert's perceived victory by his recognition as count of Flanders. See: Heather Tanner, Families, Friends, and Allies (Brill, 2004), 104.) but Robert himself was captured and his forces in turn captured the Countess Richilde. Both were freed in exchange and the battle continued to its conclusion. Among the dead was Arnulf, killed by Gerbod the Fleming, 1st Earl of Chester, possibly by accident. (Note: Gerbod the Fleming, Earl of Chester and hereditary advocate of the Abbey of Saint Bertin at Saint-Omer, Flanders, had obtained permission of William the Conqueror to return to Flanders, ostensibly to tend to his affairs there. See: C.P. Lewis, 'The Formation of the Honor of Chester, 1066-1100,' The Earldom of Chester and its Charters; A Tribute to Geoffrey Barraclough, Ed. A.T. Thacker, Journal of the Chester Archaeological Society, Chester, Vol. 71, 1991, p.39. doi:10.5284/1070311 He was at the Battle of Cassel in early 1071 and according to Gilbert of Mons killed Arnulf III in battle. After realizing he had killed the rightful count of Flanders who was also the Conqueror's nephew, he fled to Rome to seek forgiveness for the sin of killing his liege lord. Pope Gregory VII sent him to Abbot Hugh of Cluny, who permitted him to become a monk at Cluny. See: Karl Hanquet (ed.), La Chronique de Saint-Hubert dite Cantatorium (Hayez, Imprimeur de L'Academie, Bruxelles, 1906), pp. 66-67; Gilbert of Mons, Chronicle of Hainaut, Translated by Laura Napran (Boydell Press, Woodbridge, 2005), pp. 6-7.) As a result of the battle Robert claimed the countship of Flanders. Richilde and her son Baldwin returned to Hainaut but continued to instigate hostilities against Robert. As he was a minor at his death and unmarried, Arnulf III had no issue.

== See also ==
- Counts of Flanders family tree

== Notes ==
Preceded by Baldwin VI	Count of Flanders; 1070–1071	Succeeded by Robert I
