= County of Flanders =

Historical territory in present-day Belgium, France, and the Netherlands

Coordinates: 51.06°N 3.72°E

County of Flanders Graafschap Vlaanderen (Dutch)
- 862–1384/1797
- Coat of arms

- County of Flanders, 1350, in relation to the Low Countries and the Holy Roman Empire. The county was located where the border between France and the Holy Roman Empire met the North Sea.
- Status: French and Imperial fiefdom
- Capital: Bruges, later Ghent and Lille
- Common languages: Old Dutch; Middle Dutch; Dutch; Flemish; Old French; Middle French; Picard; Latin
- Religion: Roman Catholicism
- Government: Feudal monarchy
- Count of Flanders (Note: The earlier rulers were styled as margrave.)
  - 862–879: Baldwin I
  - 1792–1797: Francis II
- Historical era: Middle Ages/Early modern period
  - Fief granted to Count Baldwin I: 862
  - Annexed by France: 1795
Succeeded by
Escaut (department); Lys (department)
- Today part of: Belgium; France; Netherlands

History of the Low Countries (schematic)
Frisii		Germanic tribes		Belgae & Celts			
Frisii	Cana– nefates (Note: Roman foederati)	Chamavi, Tubantes (Note: The Chamavi merged into the confederation of the Franks; the Tubantes merged into the confederation of the Saxons.)		Gallia Belgica (55 BC–c. 5th century AD); Germania Inferior (83–c. 5th century)			
Frisii	Cana– nefates	Salian Franks		Batavi			
unpopulated (4th –c. 5th centuries)		Saxons	Salian Franks (4th–c. 5th centuries)				
Frisian Kingdom (c. 6th century – 734)		Saxons	Frankish Kingdom (481–843)—Carolingian Empire (800–843)				
Frisian Kingdom (c. 6th century – 734)		Austrasia (511–687)					
Middle Francia (843–855)				West; Francia (from 843)	Middle Francia (843–855)		
Kingdom of Lotharingia (Note: Part of East Francia after 939, divided in Upper Lorraine (as part of West Francia) and Lower Lorraine (as part of East Francia) in 959.) (855–959); Duchy of Lower Lorraine (Note: Lower Lorraine—also referred to as Lothier—disintegrated into several smaller independent territories and only the title of a "Duke of Lothier" remained, held by Brabant.) (from 959)			Kingdom of Lotharingia (855–959); Duchy of Lower Lorraine (from 959)	West; Francia (from 843)	Kingdom of Lotharingia (855–959); Duchy of Lower Lorraine (from 959)		
Frisia			Kingdom of Lotharingia (855–959); Duchy of Lower Lorraine (from 959)	County of Flanders (Note: Including County of Artois (part of Flanders until 1237) and Tournaisis.) (862–1384)	Kingdom of Lotharingia (855–959); Duchy of Lower Lorraine (from 959)		
Frisian; Freedom (Note: Lordship of Frisia and Lordship of Groningen (including the Ommelanden) after 1524 and 1536 respectively.) (11th–16th centuries)	County of Holland (Note: Including County of Zeeland, that was ruled by neighboring County of Holland and County of Flanders (until 1432).) (880–1432)	Bishopric of Utrecht (Note: Utrecht included Lordship of Overijssel (until 1528), County of Drenthe (until 1528) and County of Zutphen (until 1182).) (695–1456)	Duchy of Brabant (Note: Duchy of Brabant included since 1288 also the Duchy of Limburg (now part of Belgium's Liège Province) and the "Overmaas" lands Dalhem, Valkenburg and Herzogenrath (now part of the Dutch Province of Limburg).) (1183–1430) Duchy of Guelders (Note: The county, later duchy, of Guelders consisted of four quarters, as they were separated by rivers: situated upstream Upper Quarter (the present day northern half of the Dutch province of Limburg), spatially separated from the three downstream Lower Quarters: County of Zutphen (after 1182), Veluwe Quarter and Nijmegen Quarter. The three lower quarters emerged from the historic gau Hamaland (named after the Chamavi tribe), and formed the present day province of Gelderland. Guelders did not include the Cleves enclave Huissen and the independent counties of Buren and Culemborg, that were much later seceded to the province of Gelderland.) (1046–1543)	County of Flanders (862–1384)	County of Hainaut (1071–1432) County of Namur (981–1421)	Prince- Bishopric of Liège (Note: Throughout the Middle Ages, the bishopric was further expanded with the Duchy of Bouillon in 1096 (ceded to France in 1678), the acquisition of the county of Loon in 1366 and the county of Horne in 1568. The Lordship of Mechelen was also part of the Prince-Bishopric of Liège.)(980–1791)	Duchy of Luxembourg (1059–1443)
Frisian; Freedom (11th–16th centuries)	Burgundian Netherlands (1384–1482)					Prince- Bishopric of Liège (980–1791)	Burgundian Netherlands (1384–1482)
Habsburg Netherlands (1482–1795) (Seventeen Provinces after 1543) (Note: The name Seventeen Provinces came in use after the Habsburg emperor Charles V had re-acquired the Duchy of Guelders, and an continuous territory arose.)						Prince- Bishopric of Liège (980–1791)	Habsburg Netherlands (1482–1795) (Seventeen Provinces after 1543)
Dutch Republic (1581–1795)				Spanish Netherlands (1556–1714)		Prince- Bishopric of Liège (980–1791)	Spanish Netherlands (1556–1714)
Dutch Republic (1581–1795)				Austrian Netherlands (1714–1795)		Prince- Bishopric of Liège (980–1791)	Austrian Netherlands (1714–1795)
Dutch Republic (1581–1795)				United States of Belgium (1790)		Republic of Liège (1789–'91)	United States of Belgium (1790)
Dutch Republic (1581–1795)				Austrian Netherlands (1795–1797)		P.-Bish. of Liège (1791–1794)	Austrian Netherlands (1795–1797)
Batavian Republic (1795–1806); Kingdom of Holland (1806–1810)			associated with French First Republic (1795–1804) part of First French Empire (1804–1815)				
part of First French Empire (1810–1813)			associated with French First Republic (1795–1804) part of First French Empire (1804–1815)				
Sovereign Principality of the Netherlands (1813–1815)			associated with French First Republic (1795–1804) part of First French Empire (1804–1815)				
United Kingdom of the Netherlands (1815–1830)							Grand Duchy of Luxembourg (from 1815)
Kingdom of the Netherlands (from 1839)				Kingdom of Belgium (from 1830)			Grand Duchy of Luxembourg (from 1815)
Kingdom of the Netherlands (from 1839)				Kingdom of Belgium (from 1830)			Grand Duchy of Luxembourg (from 1890)

The County of Flanders (Note: Dutch: Graafschap Vlaanderen; West Flemish: Groafschap Vloandern; French: Comté de Flandre) was one of the most powerful political entities in the medieval Low Countries, located on the North Sea coast of modern-day Belgium and north-eastern France. Unlike the neighbouring states of Brabant and Hainaut, it was within the territory of the Kingdom of France. The counts of Flanders held the northernmost part of the kingdom, and were among the original twelve peers of France. For centuries, the economic activity of the Flemish cities, such as Ghent, Bruges, Ypres and Lille, made Flanders one of the most affluent regions in Europe, and also gave them strong international connections to trading partners.

Up to 1477, the core area under French suzerainty was west of the Scheldt. Historians call this area "Royal Flanders" (Dutch: Kroon-Vlaanderen, French: Flandre royale). Aside from this, the counts, from the 11th century onward, held land east of the river as a fief of the Holy Roman Empire, and this is referred to as "Imperial Flanders" (Rijks-Vlaanderen or Flandre impériale). From 1384, the county was politically united to the Duchy of Burgundy, and it formed the starting point for more acquisitions in the area by the duchy, and the eventual creation of the Burgundian Netherlands. The expansion of Flemish ("Burgundian") power deep into the Holy Roman Empire further complicated the relationship between Flanders and France, but reinforced the connections with Brabant, Hainaut, Holland and other parts of the Low Countries. The link to the empire was strengthened even more when the Burgundian Netherlands came into the hands of the imperial Habsburg dynasty in 1477. Most of Flanders became part of the empire after the Peace of Madrid in 1526 and the Peace of the Ladies in 1529, although it came to be ruled under the Habsburg crown of Spain. Most of the old county's territory lies outside of present-day France, one of only two parts of medieval France that are no longer part of the country; the other being Catalonia, renounced in 1258.

By 1795, the entire Austrian Netherlands, the successor of the Spanish Netherlands, was acquired by France under the French First Republic, and this was recognized by treaty in 1797. After the 1815 Battle of Waterloo, these territories, including most of the old county of Flanders, passed to the newly established United Kingdom of the Netherlands, which was split up between 1830 and 1839 into the modern countries of Belgium, Luxembourg and the Netherlands. Although the French Republic had avoided using the names of the great medieval counties for their administrative départements, the Dutch and Belgian regimes brought back such names, and as a consequence the two westernmost provinces of the Flanders region of modern Belgium are now called West Flanders and East Flanders.

== Etymology ==
A Germanic etymology for Flanders, Fleming and Flemish (Dutch: Vlaanderen, Vlaams) was proposed by Maurits Gysseling in 1948, based upon an article by René Verdeyen in 1943. According to this proposal, the terms Fleming and Flemish are likely derived from words derived from Proto-Germanic *flaumaz, meaning stream, current, flood or eddy. It is related to the Middle English flem (stream) , the Old Norse flaumr (current), the Danish flom (flood) and the Old High German floum (mud). This allows to reconstruct the words Flaumisk and Flauming, which became Flämisk and Fläming in the eighth century. To name the region, the Latin suffix -dra is used.

The region Flanders is first mentioned as "in Flandris" in the biography of Saint Eligius (c. 590–660), the Vita sancti Eligii, which was written in the eighth century. Its inhabitants are called "Flandrensis". The name refers to a region, larger than the original "Pagus Flandrensis" around Bruges.

== Geography ==
The geography of the historic County of Flanders is similar to the modern Belgian provinces of West Flanders and East Flanders, although parts of the historic county are now in France and the Netherlands. In modern Belgium, East and West Flanders are only the western extremity of the five provinces of what is now the Belgian administrative region of Flanders, which extends eastwards far beyond the historical County of Flanders. The land covered by the medieval county is spread out over several modern territories:

- Belgium:
  - two of the five Flemish provinces: West Flanders and East Flanders
  - part of the Flemish province of Antwerp: the land of Bornem
  - part of the Walloon province of Hainaut: Tournaisis and the region around Moeskroen (that belonged to West Flanders until 1962)
- France:
  - French Flanders (in the Nord departement)
    - the French westcorner: the region around Dunkirk, Bergues and Bailleul, an area where Flemish used to be the main language
    - Walloon Flanders, where the Picard language, closely related to French, was spoken.
  - Artois (in the Pas-de-Calais department): removed from Flanders in 1191 and created as independent county in 1237
- Netherlands:
  - Zeelandic Flanders, a region between Belgium and the Western Scheldt in the southern part of the modern province of Zeeland, which from 1581 formed part of the Generality Lands under control of the Dutch Republic.

== Flag and arms ==
The arms of the County of Flanders were allegedly created by Philip of Alsace, count of Flanders from 1168 to 1191; a climbing or rampant black lion on a gold field. In the story about the Battle of the Golden Spurs, the arms and its corresponding battlecry Vlaendr'n den leeuw ("Flanders, the Lion") plays a crucial role in the forming of a Flemish consciousness, which was popularised in the 19th century by the book De Leeuw van Vlaanderen by Hendrik Conscience. As a result, the arms of the county live on as arms of the Flemish community.

According to legend, Philip of Alsace brought the lion flag in 1177 from the Holy Land, where he supposedly acquired it in battle with a Saracen knight, but this is a myth. The simple fact that the lion appeared on his personal seal since 1163, well before his first voyage to the Levant, disproves it. In reality Philip was following a West-European trend: in the same period lions also appeared in the arms of Brabant, Luxembourg, Holland, Limburg and other territories. The lion as a heraldic symbol was mostly used in border territories and neighbouring countries of the Holy Roman Empire. It was in all likelihood a way of showing independence from the emperor, who used an eagle in his personal arms. In Europe, the lion had been a well-known figure since Roman times, through works such as the fables of Aesop.

== History ==
=== Antiquity and early middle ages ===
Julius Caesar conquered the areas South of the Rhine in Gaul around 54 BC and the population was partially romanised from the 1st to the 3rd century. When the Roman Empire started to decline in the fifth century, most of the Roman population retreated below a line formed by the Roman road that connected Cologne with Boulogne-sur-Mer through Bavay. In the south, the Gallo-Romanic population was able to maintain itself, while the north became a no-mans land that also suffered from regular floods from the North Sea. This void was filled by Germanic speaking Franks.

The first wave of immigration in the present day Flemish territory was accompanied by limited Christianisation. In the wake of the immigrants, missionaries tried to convert the heathen population, but had little success. The bishoprics were reinstated, usually with the same natural borders of the Late-Roman era; the Silva Carbonaria separated the Bishopric of Cambrai from the Bishopric of Tongeren, while the Scheldt again became the border between the bishoprics of Cambrai and Tournai. Vedast and Eleutherius of Tournai were assigned to reinstate the bishoprics of Arras and Tournai. However, these bishoprics failed to survive independently. In the late 6th century the bishopric of Arras was connected to that of Cambrai, and at the start of the 7th century the same was done to the bishoprics of Tournai and Noyon.

During the 7th century, the first gaue were created in the later Flemish county. A Gau was the smallest administrative entity in the Merovingian state, based on the concept of the Roman pagus. The names of nineteen gaue between the Scheldt and the Canche are recorded. One of these, the Pagus Flandriensis, referred to the coastal region between Bruges and the Yser. A pagus was governed by a count (Latin: comes) which was appointed by the king. During the merovingian and carolingian period the pagus Flandriensis is scarcely mentioned and no names of any count from this period is known. The name Flanders (Latin: in Flandris) is mentioned for the first time in the vita sancta Eligii written in the eighth century, a charter written in 745 mentions the Flemish gau (Latin: in pago Flandrinsi).

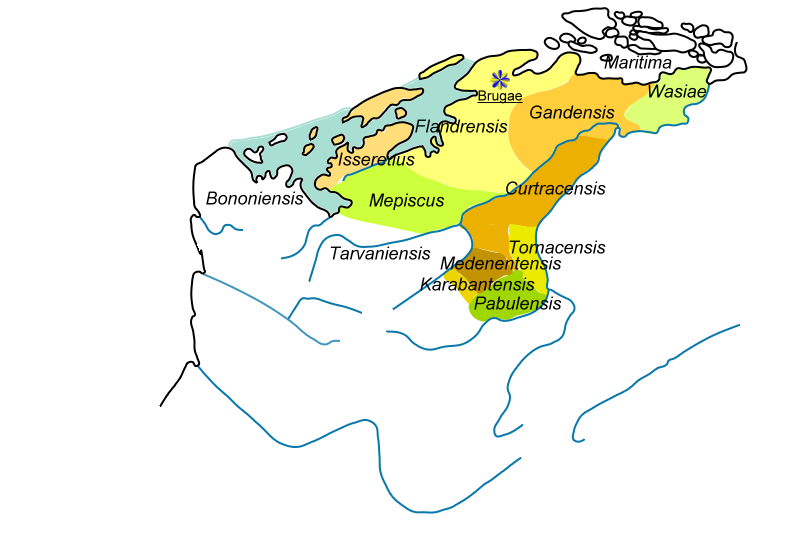
Pagi i.e. "shires" of Flanders, reunion of the former marquisate of Flanders, showing all the lands subsequently reclaimed from the sea.

=== Carolingians ===
In reaction to the growing threat of Viking invasions, Charlemagne ordered the construction of a fleet in 810. In 811 he inspected this fleet at Boulogne and Ghent. He also ordered to build fortifications along the coast, and in 820 an incursion of thirteen Viking ships was repulsed at the Flanders coast.

The region comprising future Flanders was, from an economic point of view, a flourishing region, with a series of ports along the Scheldt river: Ghent, Tournai, Valenciennes, Cambrai and Lambres at Douai on the Scarpe and a number of seaports: Quentovic, Boulogne and Isère portus, a port at the mouth of the Yser. Moreover, the region included a number of rich abbeys, such as Abbey of Saint Bertin, Saint Bavo's Abbey, Saint-Amand Abbey and the Abbey of St. Vaast.

The grandsons of Charlemagne divided his empire in three parts with the Treaty of Verdun in 843. This treaty created East Francia, Middle Francia and West Francia. West Francia, inherited by Charles the Bald, included the original pagus Flandrensis, that spanned roughly between Oudenburg, Aardenburg and Torhout. Borders between these kingdoms were defined mainly by rivers and the borders of bishoprics. In the North sea region, the Scheldt river became the border between East and Middle Francia, and later when Middle Francia was usurped by the other two kingdoms, the Scheldt became the border between France and the Holy Roman Empire. This meant that the Germanic speaking population beyond the river Scheldt was now separated from the Germanic territory.

This separation remained unchanged until the times of Charles V, Holy Roman Emperor.

The 10th-century County of Flanders next to Lotharingia.

=== Growth in the 9th to the 11th centuries (864–1071) ===
Militarily, economically and politically, Europe went through a deep crisis. The Vikings invaded from the north, the Magyar from the east and the Saracens from the south. All left trails of destruction. The central authorities of the two Frankish kingdoms were unable to organise an effective defensive, causing the population to lose faith and trust in their far-removed rulers. In the wake of this power vacuum, local powerful individuals saw their chance. Often these individuals were the descendants of people associated with Charlemagne.

The county of Flanders originated from the Gau or Pagus Flandrensis (Dutch: Vlaanderengouw). The first Margrave (Count) of Flanders was Baldwin I, who became count in 862 after he eloped with Judith of West Francia, the daughter of the Frankish king Charles the Bald. Judith, who had previously been married to two English kings, refused her father's command to return to him. After mediation by the pope, the Frankish king reconciled with his son-in-law, and gave him the title of margrave, and the corresponding beneficia.

Baldwin I was able to keep the Vikings at bay, but after his death in 879. The Vikings arrived in 880 and raided the county until 883. In reaction many motte fortifications were built long the coast but also inland. The Flemish counts made good use of the crisis situation by incorporating the surrounding plundered territories into the county. The counts expanded the influence of the original Flemish pagus to all territories south and west of the Scheldt river, including the lordship of the Four Amts, Zeelandic Flanders, the Burgraviate of Aalst to the east and the County of Artois to the southwest, which remained part of Flanders until it became a separate county in 1237. After that date, the county of Artois at various times still came under the dominion of the count of Flanders as a separate title, until it was absorbed by the French crown.

The kingdom of France in 1030 (Flanders at top, in green.)

=== The 11th to 13th centuries (1071–1278) ===
In 1071, Robert I became count of Flanders after his successful rebellion against his nephew Arnulf III who died in the battle of Cassel. Flemish knights in the 11th and 12th centuries were some of the most effective and well-respected knights of Europe even before the Crusades. They were known to be chivalrous but lax on enforcing religious norms. Nevertheless, count Robert II and his wife Clementia of Burgundy were supporters of the Cluniac reform movement and on October 1096 Robert left with an army for the First Crusade. Though the majority of Flemish nobles was absent for four years, law and order was kept thanks to the steady leadership of countess Clementia and the advocacy of bishop Lambert of Arras. For this, the local clergy promoted the Peace and Truce of God movement.

==== Prosperity in the 12th and 13th centuries ====
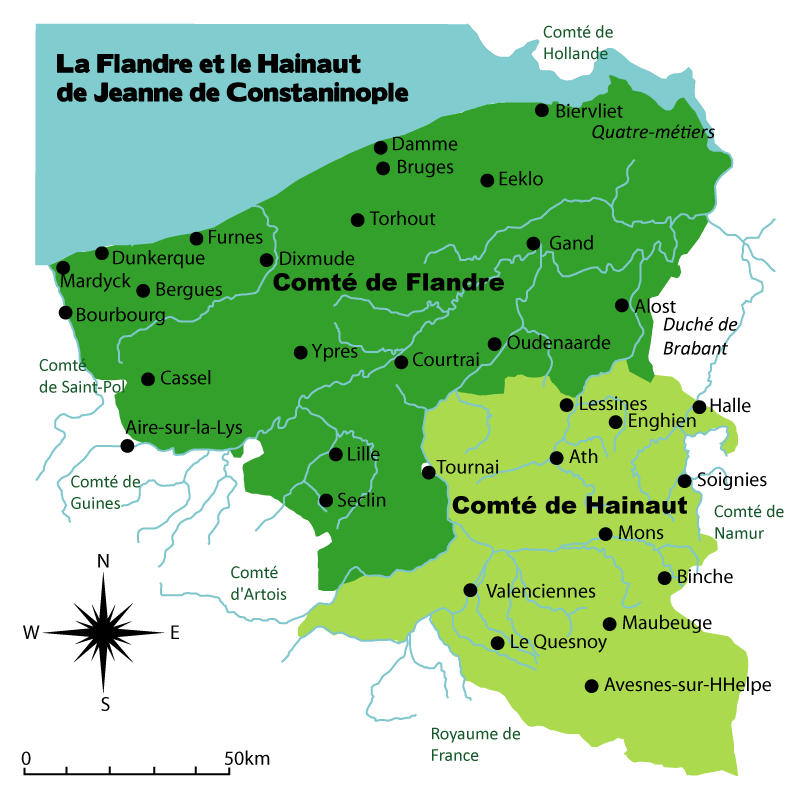
Map of Flanders and Hainault during reign of countess Joan of Constantinople (1205–1244)

The House of Flanders remained in power until 1119, when Baldwin VII of Flanders died heirless, and the county was inherited by Charles the Good, of the House of Denmark. He abandoned the title "Marquis of Flanders", which had been used alongside the comital style since the 10th century. The counts of Flanders were the last French lords using the title marquis, which would not be used again in France until 1504. After a short interlude under William Clito of Normandy (1127–1128), the county went to Thierry of Alsace of the House of Alsace. Under Thierry (1128–1168) and his successor Philip of Alsace, Flanders' importance and power increased.

In the second half of the 12th century, the county went through a period of great prosperity when Philip of Alsace managed to incorporate the County of Vermandois into Flanders through the inheritance of his wife. The territories he controlled now came to within 25 kilometers of Paris, and were larger than the territories his feudal lord, the French king, directly controlled.

During the rule of the House of Alsace, cities developed and new institutions were formed. The ports of Gravelines, Nieuwpoort, Damme, Biervliet, Dunkirk, and Mardijk were founded, as well as Calais by Philip's brother Matthew of Alsace. Aside from colonisation, the ports also functioned to reduce the silting of the rivers Aa, Yser and Zwin, which were endangering the accessibility of Saint-Omer, Ypres and Bruges. Biervliet also served as a counter to Hollandic influence.

Trade partners included England, the Baltic countries and France over sea, and the Rhineland and Italy over land. The wool trade with England was of special importance to the rising cloth industry in Flanders. The wealth of many Flemish cities (as their belfries and cloth halls testify) came from the drapery industry. Aside from this, the grain trade with England and through Holland with Hamburg were also important. Saint-Omer became the most important transit-port for French wine in the 12th century. These were the centuries of the breakthrough of the Flemish merchants, with their trade with England, the Baltic area and South-West France, as well as the land routes to the Rhineland and Italy though later only the yearly fairs of Champagne. Flanders's flourishing trading towns made it one of the most urbanised parts of Europe.

In 1194, Baldwin I of Constantinople of the House of Hainaut, succeeded the House of Alsace.

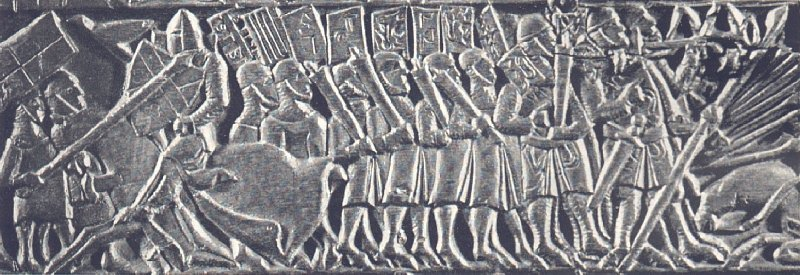
Flemish militia in the line of battle during the Battle of the Golden Spurs, as depicted on the Oxford Chest.

=== The crisis of the 14th century (1278–1384) ===
When Philip the Fair became king of France in 1285, he changed the French policy in two ways: no more constant military campaigning like his father had done in Italy and Spain but instead opponents were challenged with legal arguments before the Parlement of Paris, and no more campaigning abroad but instead reinforcing the royal power within his kingdom by trying to subject the powerful vassals in the Duchy of Brittany, County of Champagne, Duchy of Aquitaine and County of Flanders. Through the parlement of Paris, Philip intervened in the conflict between Guy of Dampierre, Count of Flanders and the big towns of Flanders, Ghent, Bruges and Ypres. After much legalist action, Guy finally sought an alliance with the English King Edward I and renounced his fealty to Philip. This led to the Franco-Flemish War in 1297. In 1300 Guy surrendered to Philip, the county of Flanders was annexed to France and the count of Flanders was replaced with a governor. The French governor Jacques de Châtillon imposed harsh measures and taxes on the cities, which ignated a revolt at Bruges and rallied the cities around the count of Flanders. In 1302 these town militia and few Flemish nobles won an unexpected victory over the French army at the Battle of the Golden Spurs. But finally the French prevailed at the battle of Mons-en-Pévèle in 1304 and with the subsequent treaty of Athis-sur-Orge (1305) Flanders lost Lille, Douai, and Orchies to France and had to pay exorbitant fines but retained its independence as a fief of the French kingdom.

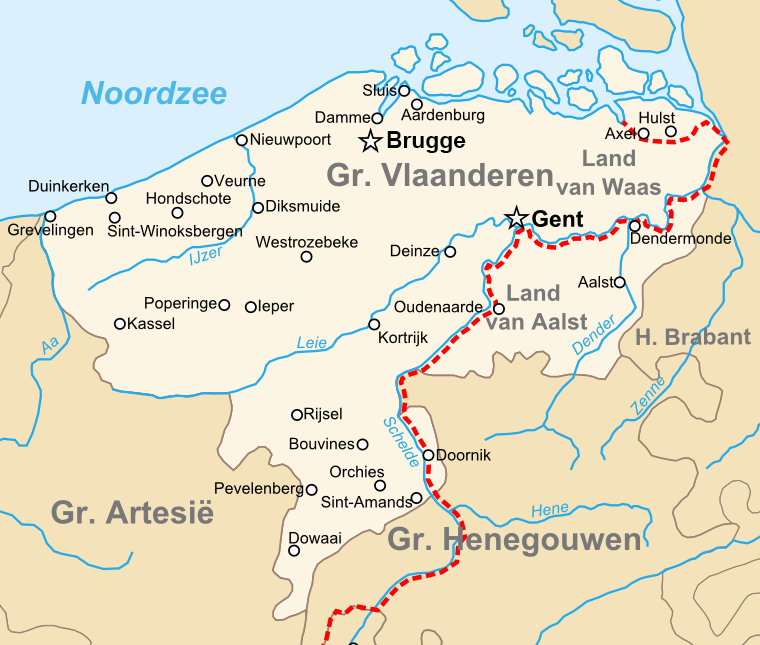
Topographic map of the county of Flanders at the end of the 14th century, the French-Imperial border marked in red

During this period, Flanders experienced a period of prosperity with its strong cloth industry. Flemish prosperity waned in the following century, owing to widespread European population decline following the Black Death of 1348, the disruption of trade during the Anglo-French Hundred Years' War (1338–1453), and increased English cloth production. Flemish weavers had gone over to Worstead and North Walsham in Norfolk in the 12th century and established the wool industry.

In 1369 Count Louis II of Flanders arranged through the French king Charles V the marriage of his only daughter Margaret with the brother of the king Philip the Bold, the duke of Burgundy. As a dowry the territories lost in 1305 were given back to the count of Flanders, but Philip had to promise Charles to hand over all Flemish possessions on the death of his father-in-law.

=== The Burgundian 15th century (1384–1506) ===
Philip the Bold did not keep his promise to his brother, but instead he and his successors of the House of Valois-Burgundy founded the Burgundian State. They kept the title of count of Flanders and kept local institutions, but subjected these local institutions to a central government.

In 1449, the city of Ghent revolted against duke Philip the Good. In 1453, Philip crushed the rebels at the battle of Gavere, ending the revolt. The cities of Ghent and Bruges had previously operated virtually as city-states, and upon the death of duke Charles the Bold attempted to re-assert this position by means of the Great Privilege that they wrested from Mary of Burgundy, Charles' daughter and successor. In 1482, this last Burgundian ruler died, making her young son Philip I of Castile of the House of Habsburg the new count, and her husband Maximilian I of Austria the regent. The Flemish cities staged two more revolts, but these were ultimately subdued by the armies of the Holy Roman Empire.

The 1493 Treaty of Senlis established peace between France and the Habsburgs; per the terms of the treaty, Flanders would henceforth be a territory of the Holy Roman Empire.

=== The seventeen provinces in the 16th century (1506–98) ===
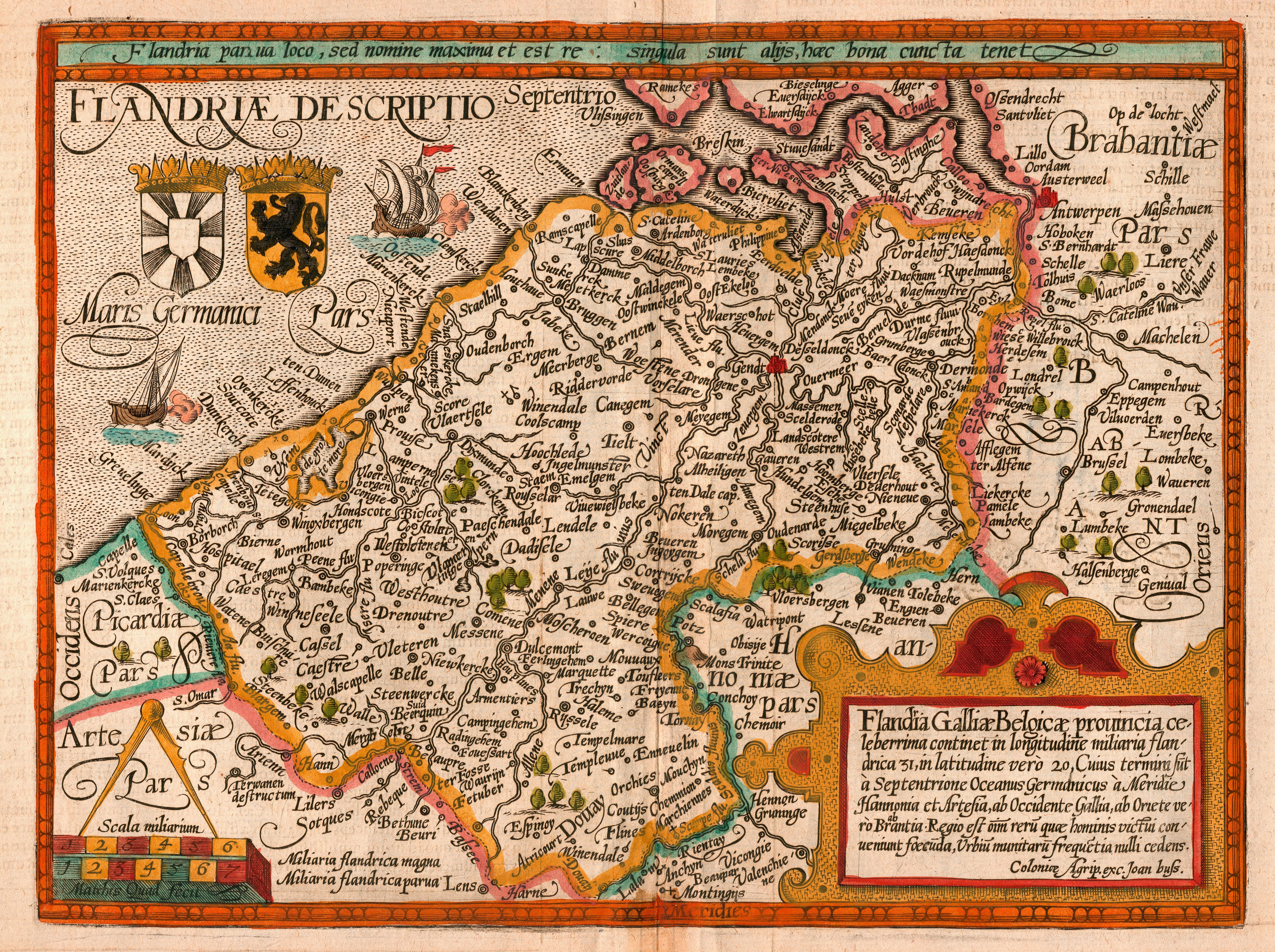
Map of the county of Flanders from 1609 by Matthias Quad, cartographer, and Johannes Bussemacher, engraver and publisher, Cologne

Charles V, Holy Roman Emperor was as Count of Flanders a vasal of the King of France. At the conclusion of one of the many Italian wars in 1529, the Treaty of Cambrai stipulated that both the counties of Artois and Flanders were not part of the French kingdom anymore, the count of Flanders ceased to be a vassal of the French king. After 696 years the county of Flanders was detached from France but this did not result in more autonomy as the previous counts of Flanders had strived for, but rather the contrary: it was now just one of the many components of the Low Countries. Through the Pragmatic Sanction of 1549, the Seventeen Provinces of the Low countries were constitutionally unified in one entity. Within the Holy Roman Empire this entity was called the Burgundian Circle.

Lordship transferred to the Spanish branch of the House of Habsburg with Philip II of Spain, and after 1556 belonged to the Kings of Spain.

It was in Steenvoorde (French Flanders) in 1566 that the Beeldenstorm erupted. The Beeldenstorm spread through all of the Low Countries and eventually led to the Eighty Years' War and the secession of the Republic of the Seven United Netherlands. Originally, Flanders cooperated with the northern provinces as a member of the Union of Utrecht, and also signed the Act of Abjuration in 1581, but from 1579 to 1585, in the period known as the "Calvinist Republic of Ghent", it was reconquered by the Spanish army.

=== The Spanish 17th century (1598–1713) ===
Map of the region Hauts-de-France, with its five départements as formed in the Revolution, colored according to the historical provinces as they existed until 1790. These show the parts of Flanders and Hainault as well as all of Artois conquered by Louis XIV. Apart from the territories mentioned above in the text, tiny amounts of Artois and Picardy also contributed to the Nord département. Picardy Île-de-France Artois French Flanders French Hainaut Cambrai Champagne Other

Flanders stayed under Spanish control. Through the efforts of the French king Louis XIV, the entire southern part of Flanders was annexed by France, and became known as South-Flanders or French Flanders. This situation was formalised in 1678 at the Treaty of Nijmegen.

=== The Austrian 18th century (1713–89) ===
After the extinction of the Spanish branch of the Habsburgs, the Austrian branch of the Habsburgs became counts of Flanders. Under Maria Theresa of Austria, the Austrian Netherlands flourished.

=== Last years (1789–97) ===
In 1789, a revolution broke out against emperor Joseph II. In 1790, the county of Flanders and a separate province called West Flanders, which constituted the territories returned to the Emperor by France, were two of the founding members of the United States of Belgium. Just like the other parts of the Austrian Netherlands, the county of Flanders declared its independence. This took place on the Friday-market at Ghent on 4 January 1790. The "Manifest van Vlaenderen" was drawn up by Charles-Joseph de Graeve and Jean-Joseph Raepsaet.

The county of Flanders was annexed by France in 1795, after the battle of Fleurus. The French republic abolished all political entities from the ancien régime and the county of Flanders officially ceased to exist. The title of count of Flanders became a symbolical title which was only used sporadicly ever after.

After the French Revolutionary Wars and the Napoleonic Wars the county was not restored, and instead the two departments continued their existence as the provinces of East and West Flanders in the Unitarian United Kingdom of the Netherlands and later, after the Belgian Revolution, in Belgium.
