= Battle of Cassel (1071) =

Battle between Robert I of Flanders and his nephew, Arnulf III

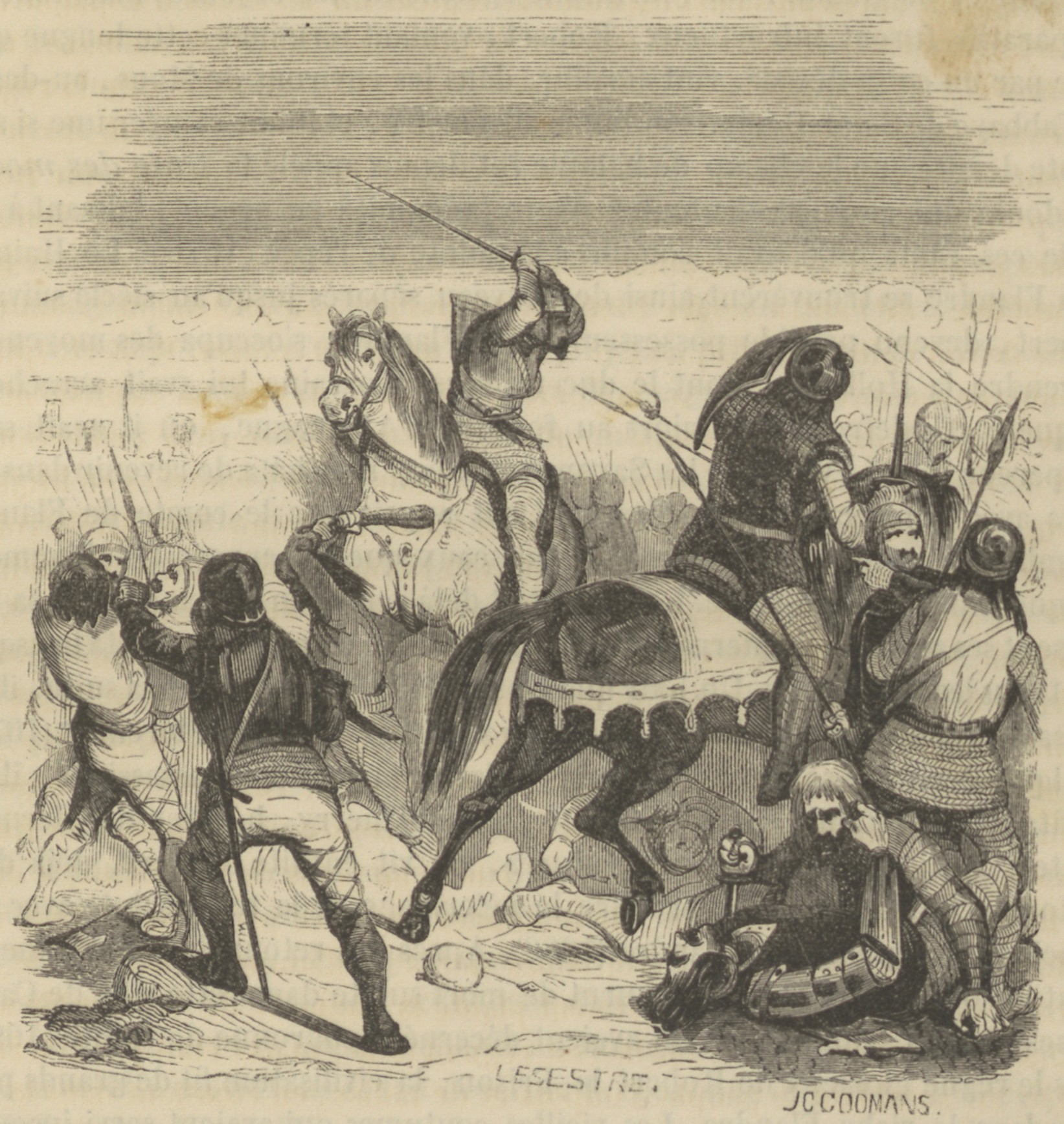
- Battle of Cassel in 1071 (engraving by Gustave Lesestre after Joseph Coomans, 1842)
Date	February 1071
Location	Cassel, France 50.8006°N 2.4883°E
Result	Victory for Robert of Flanders; Robert succeeds Arnulf III

Commanders and leaders
Robert I of Flanders	Philip I of France; Arnulf III, Count of Flanders †; William FitzOsbern †

The Battle of Cassel was fought in February 1071 (Note: Sources differ on the exact date of the battle. Historians Peter Rex and Eljas Oksanen state the battle occurred either on 20 or 21 February, while the historian Mark Hagger writes the battle took place on 20 or 22 February. John Beeler, David Charles Douglas, and John France all state the battle occurred on 22 February.) between Robert I of Flanders (or Robert the Frisian) and his nephew, Arnulf III (son of Baldwin VI of Flanders). The battle was a victory for Robert, and Arnulf was killed in the battle.

Arnulf succeeded his father Baldwin in 1070 and was supported by his mother Richilde, Countess of Mons and Hainaut. However, Robert challenged Arnulf's succession to the throne of Flanders and began rallying support mainly in northern Flanders (where the bulk of Arnulf's forces were located). Arnulf's ranks contained Eustace II and Eustace III of Boulogne. Moreover, Arnulf was supported by King Philip I of France. A contingent of ten Norman knights led by William FitzOsbern were among the forces sent by Philip to aid Arnulf.

Robert's forces attacked Arnulf's numerically superior army before it could organize. Arnulf himself was killed along with William FitzOsbern, while Richilde was captured by Robert's forces. However, Robert himself was also captured by Eustace II. Ultimately, Richilde was exchanged for Robert's freedom.

Robert became count of Flanders and ruled until 1093. He gained the friendship of King Philip by offering him the hand in marriage of his stepdaughter, Bertha of Holland.

== Sources ==
- Beeler, John (1971). Warfare in Feudal Europe, 730-1200. Cornell University Press. "For example, the two modern historians who have written in detail about the rather obscure battle of Cassel in Flanders (22 February 1071)..."
- Douglas, David Charles (1967). William the Conqueror: The Norman Impact Upon England. University of California Press. "The decisive battle was fought on 22 February 1071, and it resulted in the overthrow of Richeldis, the establishment of Robert le Frison as count of Flanders...."
- France, John (1994). Victory in the East: A Military History of the First Crusade. Cambridge University Press. ISBN 0-521-58987-8. "The battle of Cassel on 22 February 1071 was fairly widely noted by contemporaries . ... Arnulf III was killed and so was William FitzOsborn; Richilde was captured by Robert's men.."
- Hagger, Mark (2012). William: King and Conqueror. I.B. Tauris.
- Oksanen, Eljas (2012). Flanders and the Anglo-Norman World, 1066–1216. Cambridge University Press.
- Rex, Peter (2011). 1066: A New History of the Norman Conquest. Amberley Publishing.
