= List of countesses of Flanders by marriage =

This is a list of countesses of Flanders by marriage.

== Countess of Flanders ==
=== House of Flanders, 862–1119 ===
Picture	Name	Father	Birth	Marriage	Became countess	Ceased to be countess	Death	Spouse
	Judith	Charles the Bald (Carolingian)	October 844	13 December 862		879 husband's death	after 870	Baldwin I
	Ælfthryth of Wessex	Alfred the Great (Wessex)	877	893–899		10 September 918 husband's death	7 June 929	Baldwin II
	Adele of Vermandois	Herbert II, Count of Vermandois (Herbertien)	910/15	934		10 October 960		Arnulf I
	Matilda Billung of Saxony	Herman, Duke of Saxony (Billung)	935/45	951/59	958 husband's join rule with father	1 January 962 husband's death	25 May 1008	Baldwin III
	Rozala of Italy	Berengar II of Italy (Ivrea)	950/960	968		30 March 987 husband's death	13 December 1003 or 7 February 1004	Arnulf II
	Ogive of Luxembourg	Sigfried, Count of the Ardennes (Luxembourg)	980–995	1012		21 February/9 March 1030		Baldwin IV
	Eleanor of Normandy	Richard II, Duke of Normandy (Normandy)	1011/13	after 1030		30 May 1035 husband's death	after 1071	Baldwin IV
	Adela of France	Robert II of France (Capet)	1009	1028	30 May 1035 husband's accession	1 September 1067 husband's death	8 January 1079	Baldwin V
	Richilde, Countess of Mons and Hainaut	–	1031	1051	1 September 1067 husband's accession	17 July 1070 husband's death	15 March 1086	Baldwin VI
	Gertrude Billung of Saxony	Bernard II, Duke of Saxony (Billung)	1030	1063	22 February 1071 husband's accession	13 October 1093 husband's death	4 August 1113	Robert I
	Clementia of Burgundy	William I, Count of Burgundy (Ivrea)	1078	before 1092	13 October 1093 husband's accession	5 October 1111 husband's death	1078	Robert II
	Hawise of Brittany	Alan IV, Duke of Brittany (Cornouaille)	–	1105 or 1110	5 October 1111 husband's accession	1110 or after marriage annulled by the Pope on grounds of consanguinity	–	Baldwin VII

=== House of Estridsen, 1119–1127 ===
Picture	Name	Father	Birth	Marriage	Became Countess	Ceased to be Countess	Death	Spouse
	Marguerite of Clermont	Renaud II, Count of Clermont	1104/05	before July 1119	17 July 1119 husband's accession	2 March 1127 husband's death	after 1145	Charles I

=== House of Normandy, 1127–1128 ===
Picture	Name	Father	Birth	Marriage	Became Countess	Ceased to be Countess	Death	Spouse
	Joan of Montferrat	Rainier, Marquess of Montferrat (Aleramici)	1107	January 1127	30 March 1127 husband's accession	28 July 1128 husband's death	1191	William Clito

=== House of Metz, 1128–1194 ===
Picture	Name	Father	Birth	Marriage	Became Countess	Ceased to be Countess	Death	Spouse
	Suanhilde	–	–	–	28 July 1128 husband's accession	4 September 1132		Thierry
	Sibylla of Anjou	Fulk of Jerusalem (Anjou)	1112/16	1139		1165		Thierry
	Elisabeth, Countess of Vermandois	Ralph I, Count of Vermandois (Vermandois)	1143	1156	17 January 1168 husband's accession	28 March 1183		Philip I
	Theresa of Portugal	Afonso I of Portugal (Burgundy)	1157	August 1183		1 August 1191 husband's death	6 May 1218	Philip I

=== House of Hainaut, 1194–1278 ===
Picture	Name	Father	Birth	Marriage	Became Countess	Ceased to be Countess	Death	Spouse
	Marie of Champagne	Henry I, Count of Champagne (Blois)	1174	6 January 1186	15 November 1194 husband's accession	9 August 1204		Baldwin IX

=== House of Dampierre, 1247–1405 ===
Picture	Name	Father	Birth	Marriage	Became Countess	Ceased to be Countess	Death	Spouse
	Beatrice of Brabant	Henry II, Duke of Brabant (Leuven)	1225	November 1247		6 June 1251 husband's death	11 November 1288	William II
	Matilda of Bethune	Robert VII, Lord of Bethune (Bethune)	after 1230	2 February 1246	6 June 1251 husband's accession	8 November 1264		Guy
	Isabelle, Marchioness of Namur	Henry V, Count of Luxembourg (Luxembourg)	1247	March or May 1264		25 September 1298		Guy
	Margaret I, Countess of Burgundy	Philip V of France (Capet)	1309	22 July 1320	17 September 1322 husband's accession	26 August 1346 husband's death	9 May 1382	Louis I
	Margaret of Brabant	Henry II, Duke of Brabant (Leuven)	9 February 1323	6 June 1347		1380		Louis II

=== House of Valois-Burgundy, 1405–1482 ===
Picture	Name	Father	Birth	Marriage	Became Countess	Ceased to be Countess	Death	Spouse
	Margaret of Bavaria	Albert I, Duke of Bavaria (Wittelsbach)	1363	12 April 1385	21 March 1405 husband's accession	10 September 1419 husband's death	23 January 1423	John
	Michèle de Valois	Charles VI of France (Valois)	11 January 1395	June 1409	10 September 1419 husband's accession	8 July 1422		Philip II
	Bonne of Artois	Philip of Artois, Count of Eu (Artois)	1396	30 November 1424		17 September 1425		Philip II
	Isabella of Portugal	John I of Portugal (Aviz)	21 February 1397	7 January 1430		15 July 1467 husband's death	17 December 1471	Philip II
	Margaret of York	Richard Plantagenet, 3rd Duke of York (York)	3 May 1446	9 July 1468		5 January 1477 husband's death	23 November 1503	Charles II

=== House of Habsburg, 1482–1700 ===
Picture	Name	Father	Birth	Marriage	Became Countess	Ceased to be Countess	Death	Spouse
	Joanna of Castile	Ferdinand II of Aragon (Trastámara)	6 November 1479	20 October 1496		25 September 1506 husband's death	12 April 1555	Philip III
	Isabella of Portugal	Manuel I of Portugal (Aviz)	24 October 1503	11 March 1526		1 May 1539		Charles III
	Mary I of England	Henry VIII of England (Tudor)	18 February 1516	25 July 1554	16 January 1556 husband's ascension	17 November 1558		Philip IV
	Elisabeth of Valois	Henry II of France (Valois)	2 April 1545	22 June 1559		3 October 1568		Philip IV
	Anna of Austria	Maximilian II, Holy Roman Emperor (Habsburg)	1 November 1549	May 1570		26 October 1580		Philip IV
	Elisabeth of Bourbon	Henry IV of France (Bourbon)	22 November 1602	25 November 1615	31 March 1621 husband's ascension	6 October 1644		Philip V
	Mariana of Austria	Ferdinand III, Holy Roman Emperor (Habsburg)	24 December 1634	7 October 1649		17 September 1665 husband's death	16 May 1696	Philip V
	Marie Louise of Orléans	Philippe I, Duke of Orléans (Bourbon-Orléans)	26 March 1662	19 November 1679		12 February 1689		Charles IV
	Maria Anna of the Palatinate-Neuburg	Philip William, Elector Palatine (Wittelsbach)	28 October 1667	14 May 1690		1 November 1700 husband's death	16 July 1740	Charles IV

=== House of Bourbon, 1700–1706 ===
Picture	Name	Father	Birth	Marriage	Became Countess	Ceased to be Countess	Death	Spouse
	Maria Luisa of Savoy	Victor Amadeus II of Sardinia (Savoy)	17 September 1688	2 November 1701		c. 1706; County ceded to Austria	14 February 1714	Philip VI

=== House of Habsburg, 1706–1780 ===
Picture	Name	Father	Birth	Marriage	Became Countess	Ceased to be Countess	Death	Spouse
	Elisabeth Christine of Brunswick-Wolfenbüttel	Louis Rudolph, Duke of Brunswick-Lüneburg (Welf)	28 August 1691	1 August 1708		20 October 1740 husband's death	21 December 1750	Charles V

=== House of Habsburg-Lorraine, 1780–1795 ===
Picture	Name	Father	Birth	Marriage	Became Countess	Ceased to be Countess	Death	Spouse
	Maria Luisa of Spain	Charles III of Spain (Bourbon)	24 November 1745	5 August 1765	20 February 1790 husband's ascession	1 March 1792 husband's death	15 May 1792	Leopold
	Maria Theresa of Naples and Sicily	Ferdinand I of the Two Sicilies (Bourbon-Two Sicilies)	6 June 1772	15 September 1790	1 March 1792 husband's ascession	1795; Conquered by the French First Republic	13 April 1807	Francis

=== House of Saxe-Coburg and Gotha, 1840–2002 ===
Picture	Name	Father	Birth	Marriage	Became Countess	Ceased to be Countess	Death	Spouse
	Princess Marie of Hohenzollern-Sigmaringen	Charles Anthony, Prince of Hohenzollern-Sigmaringen (Hohenzollern-Sigmaringen)	17 November 1845	25 April 1867		17 November 1905 husband's death	26 November 1912	Prince Philippe
Remained vacant under Prince Charles. Title Abolished in 2002.

== See also ==
- List of Dutch consorts
