= Baldwin of Flanders =

Baldwin of Flanders may refer to:

- Baldwin I, Count of Flanders (died 879)
- Baldwin II, Count of Flanders (c. 865–918)
- Baldwin III, Count of Flanders (c. 940–962)
- Baldwin IV, Count of Flanders (c. 980–1035)
- Baldwin V, Count of Flanders (1012–1067)
- Baldwin VI, Count of Flanders (c. 1030–1070)
- Baldwin VII, Count of Flanders (1093–1119)
- Baldwin VIII, Count of Flanders (1150–1195), also Baldwin V, Count of Hainaut
- Baldwin IX, Count of Flanders (1172–1205), also Baldwin VI, Count of Hainaut, a leader of the Fourth Crusade and Baldwin I, Latin Emperor

== See also ==
- Baldwin of Jerusalem
