= Saint Peter's Abbey, Ghent =

Saint Peter's Abbey
- Sint-Pietersabdij
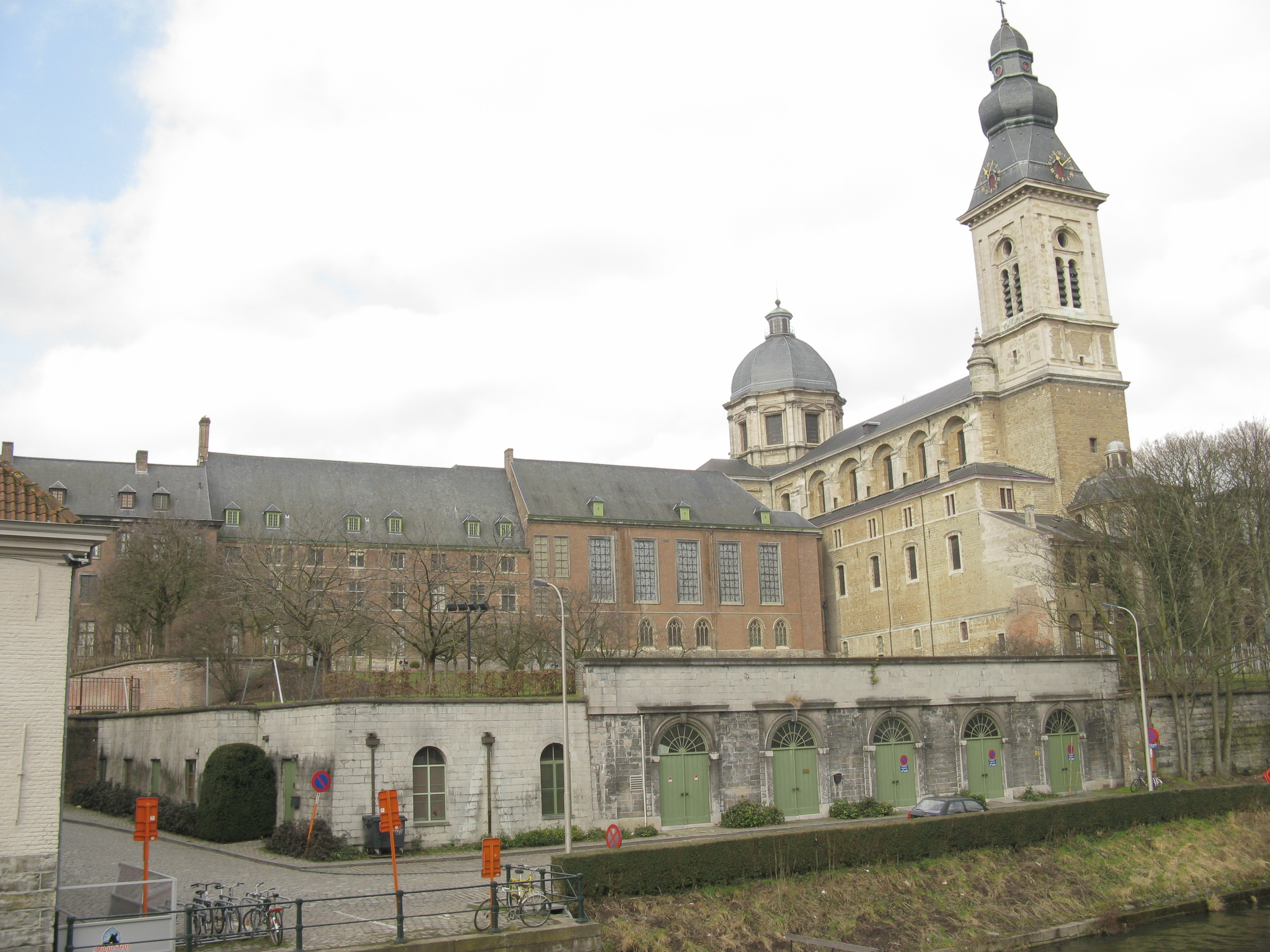
- Saint Peter's Abbey

- Location within Belgium

General information
- Architectural style: Medieval; Baroque
- Location: Sint-Pietersplein 9, Ghent, Belgium
- Coordinates: 51°2′31.7″N 3°43′36.1″E
- Owner: Historische Huizen Gent ("Historic Houses Ghent")

Website
- historischehuizen.stad.gent/en/st-peters-abbey

Saint Peter's Abbey (Dutch: Sint-Pietersabdij) is a former Benedictine abbey in Ghent, Belgium, now a museum and exhibition centre.

== History ==
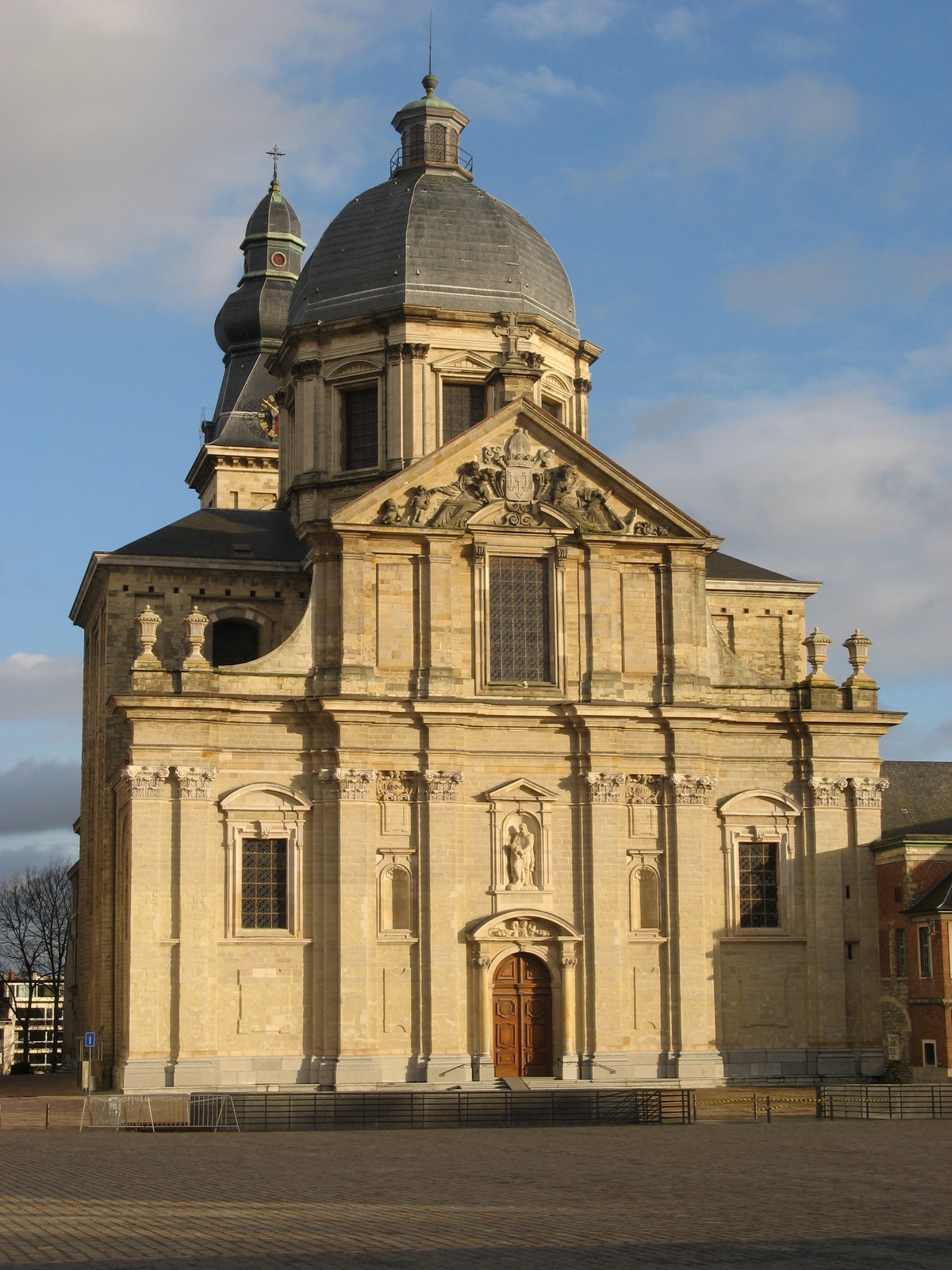
Our Lady of Saint Peter's Church

=== Middle Ages ===
Saint Peter's was founded in the late 7th century by Amandus, a missionary sent by the Frankish kings to Christianize the pagan inhabitants of the region, who founded two monasteries in the area, St. Bavo's, and Saint Peter's on the Blandijnberg. During the winter of 879-80, the abbey was raided and plundered by the Normans, and it remained relatively poor until the 10th century when the abbey became the privileged burial ground of the rulers of the County of Flanders.

In particular, Count Arnulf I considerably enriched the abbey with donations of property (some of which he or his father had usurped) and relics. So did further donations by Elthruda, the niece of King Alfred, who donated in 918, St. Mary's Church in Lewisham, Greenwich and by Arnulf's cousin King Edgar. Count Arnulf I also replaced the canons with Benedictine monks shortly before 941. By the second half of the century it was the wealthiest abbey in Flanders, and the reputation of the abbey school extended far beyond the town.

In 984, Gerbert of Aurillac, director of the cathedral school of Reims, (later Pope Sylvester II) inquired whether students from Reims could be admitted to Saint Peter's, and its renown as a centre of artes liberales continued into the 11th century. Saint Peter's, through its ownership of large tracts of land, also played a pioneering role in cultivation during the twelfth and thirteenth centuries, transforming forests, moors and marshes into farmland. In the fifteenth century a large-scale programme of construction created the abbey library and scriptorium, enlarged the refectory, and the abbey church and other buildings were considerably beautified.

=== Early Modern Period ===
Saint Peter's first decline began following the Revolt of Ghent in 1539, and by the 1560s the Low Countries were plunged in a religious crisis that resulted in an attack by iconoclasts in 1566 in which the abbey church was wrecked, the library looted, and other buildings badly damaged. The infirmary was pressed into service as a temporary home for the monks and the refectory used as a place of worship. However opposition continued and in 1578 the abbot and monks were forced to flee to Douai. The abbey buildings were sold at public auction and were partly demolished, the materials being used to construct the city walls. The abbey finally came back into the hands of the church in 1584, and it was eventually rebuilt, with a new abbey church, begun in 1629, in the Baroque style, as well as several other new builds and refurbishments. During the 18th century, the abbey was once again flourishing, as new buildings were constructed and older ones enlarged, including the conversion of the old dormitory into a library with more than ten thousand books.

However, the end was not far off, first with the Brabant Revolution of 1789–90, then the French invasion of 1793. Finally, on 1 September 1796, the Directory abolished all religious institutions. In 1798 the library was emptied and eventually taken to the University of Ghent. From 1798 the abbey church was used as a museum, but was returned to the ownership of the church in 1801 and renamed Onze-Lieve-Vrouw-Sint-Pieterskerk ("Our Lady of Saint Peter's Church"). In 1810, the rest of the abbey became the property of the city of Ghent, and was partially demolished for the construction of a military barracks, which remained on the site until 1948.

=== Modernity ===
Around 1950 the city launched a programme of restoration, which is still ongoing, which began with the cloister and chapter house, then the west wing, including the old refectory and kitchens. Work on the wine cellars and attics was completed in the 1970s, and in 1982 work on the abbey gardens was completed, and in 1986 the terrace. In the 1990s restoration of the refectory wing began.

The abbey is now used as a museum and exhibition centre, which in 2000 housed a major exhibition as part of the Year of Emperor Charles, and in October 2001 hosted the 88th meeting of the European Council.

=== Gallery ===
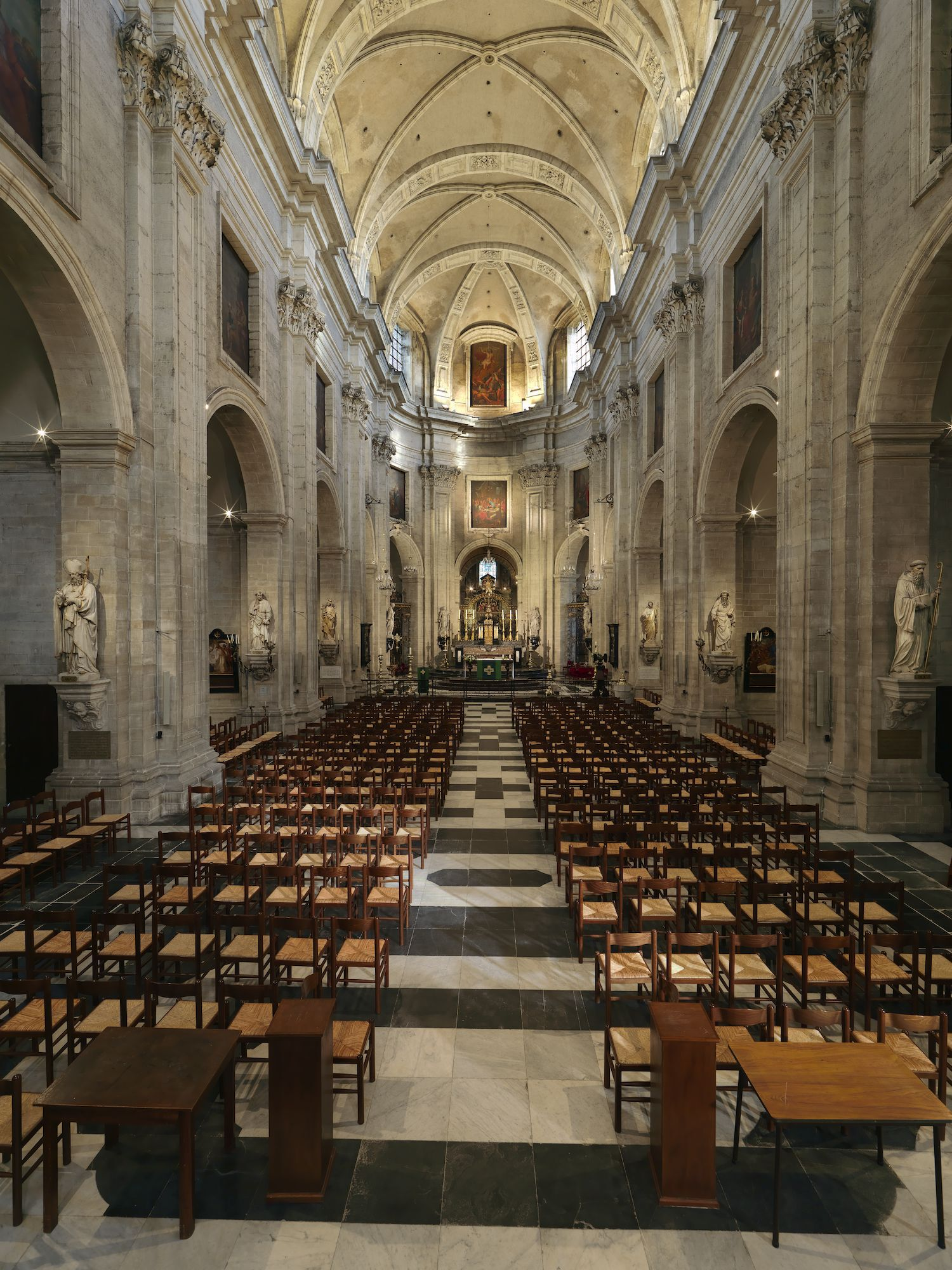
Central nave designed by Pieter Huyssens

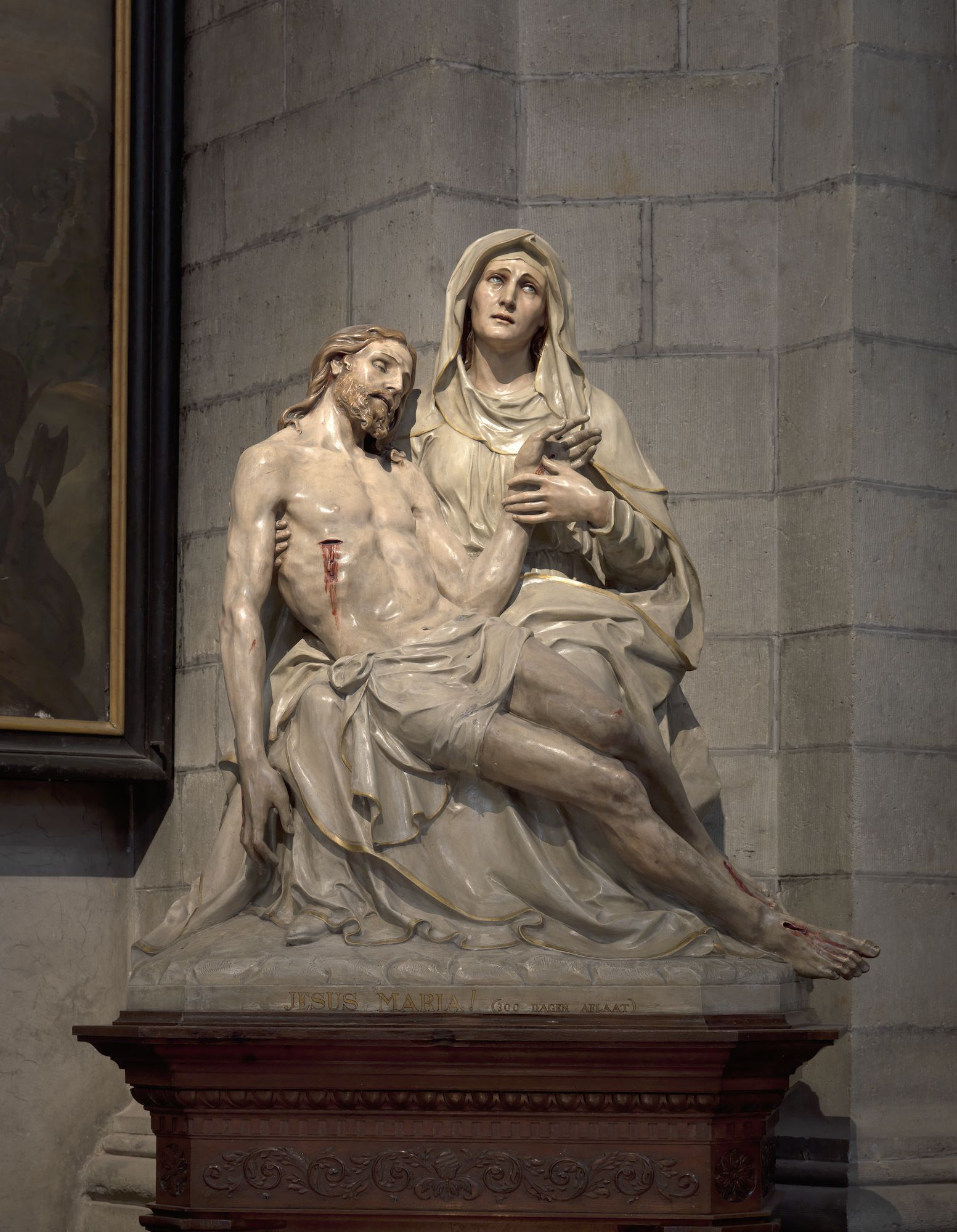
Interior

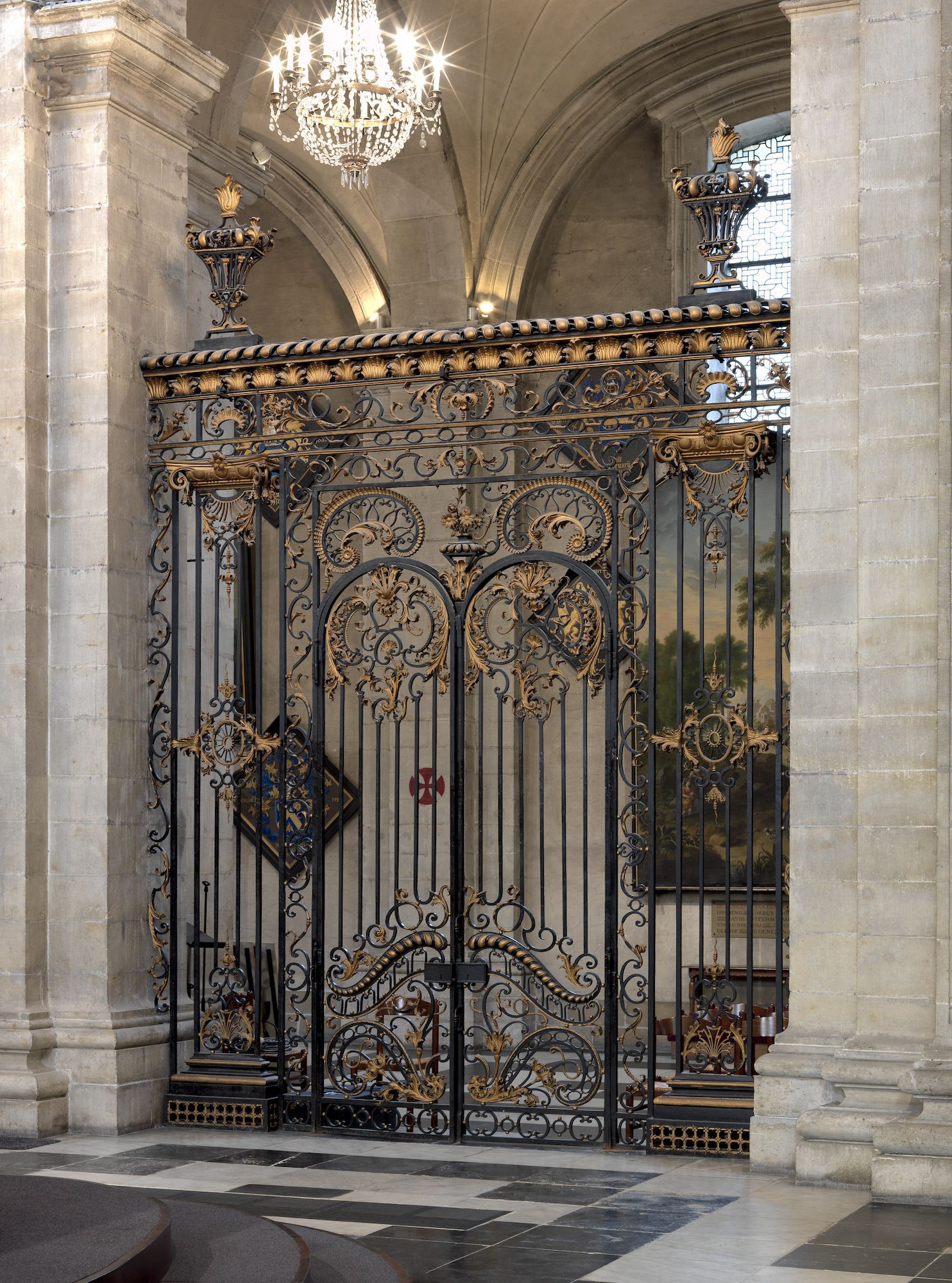
Interior view

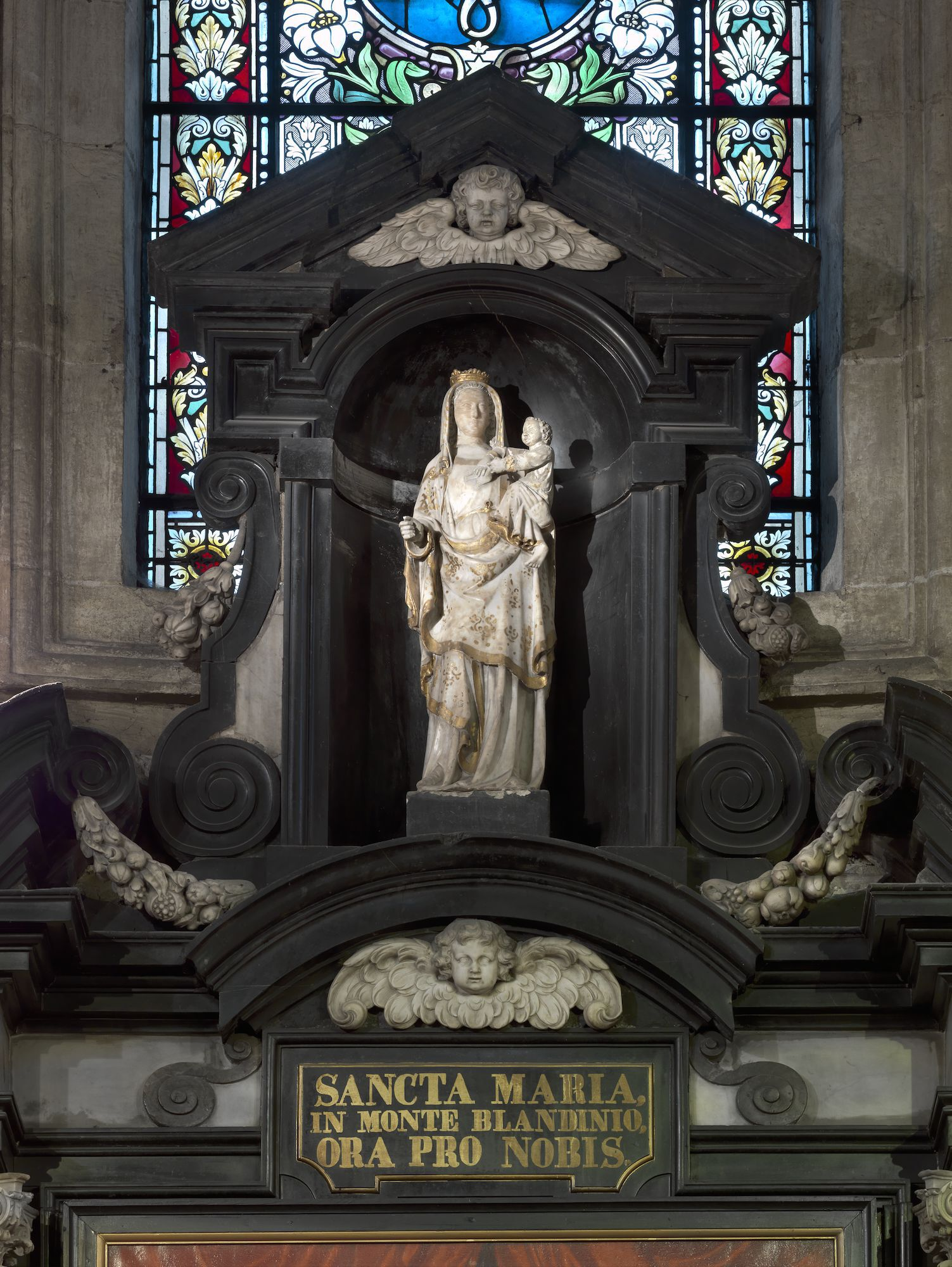
Interior view of the church

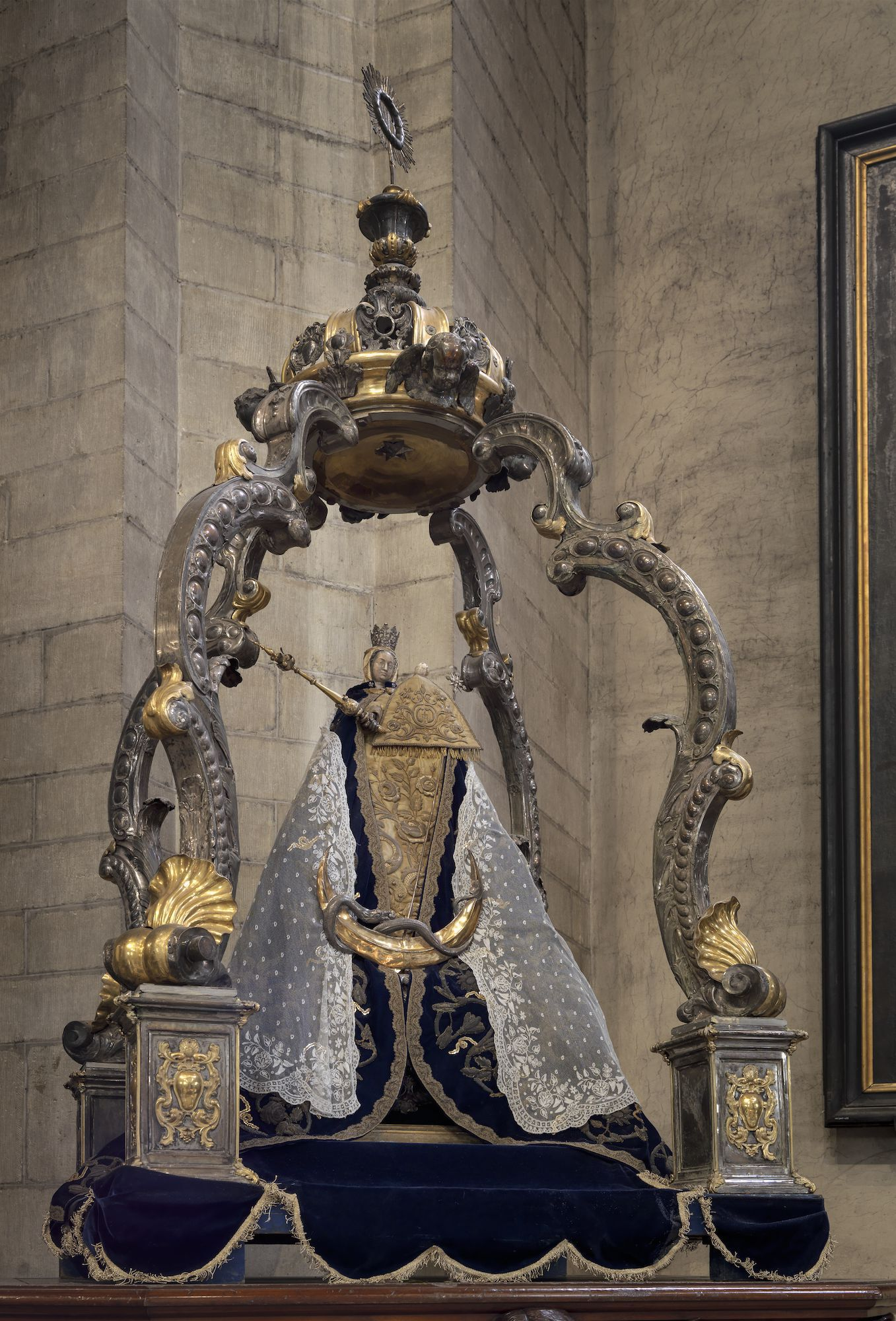
Interior

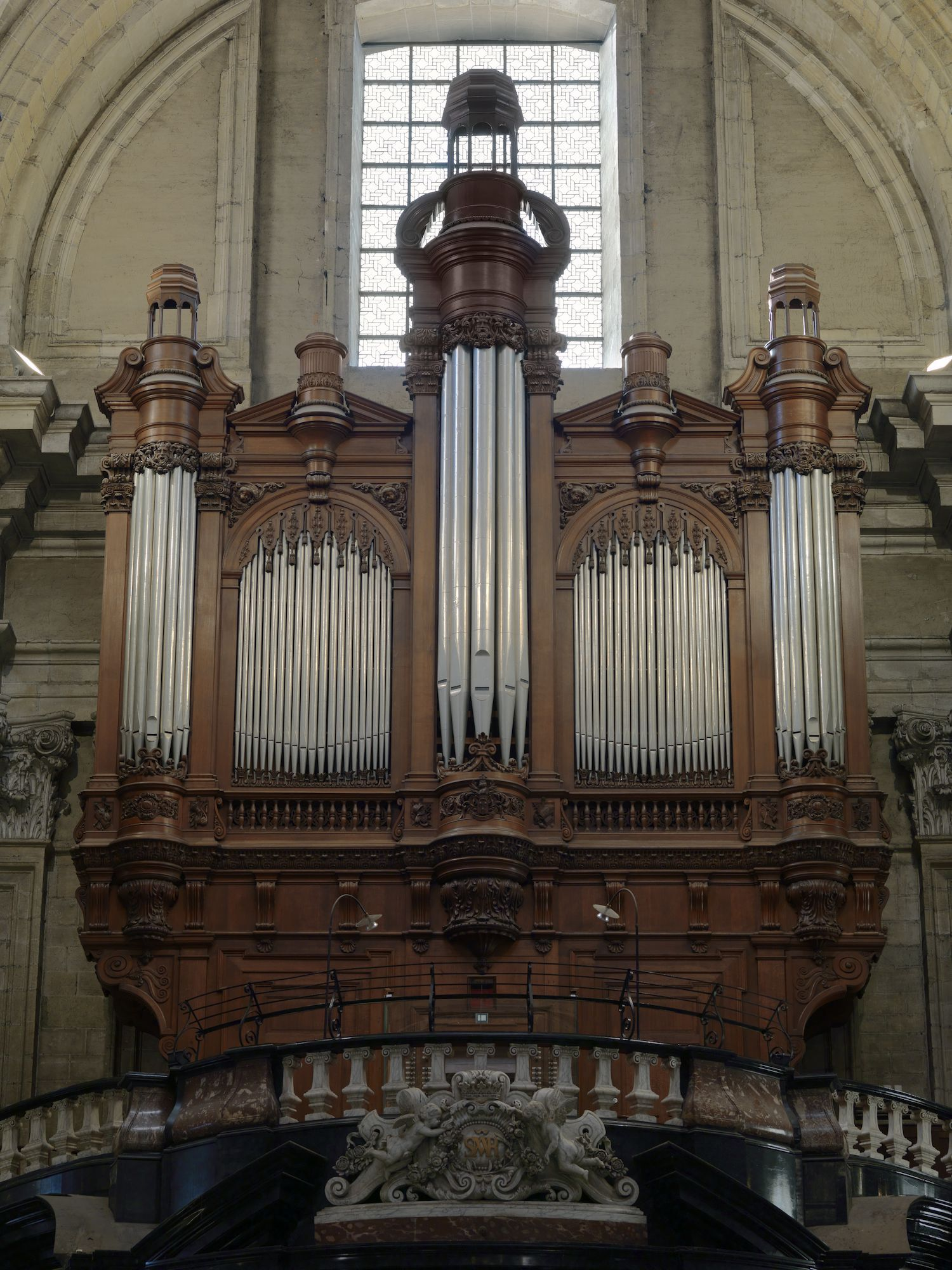
Organ

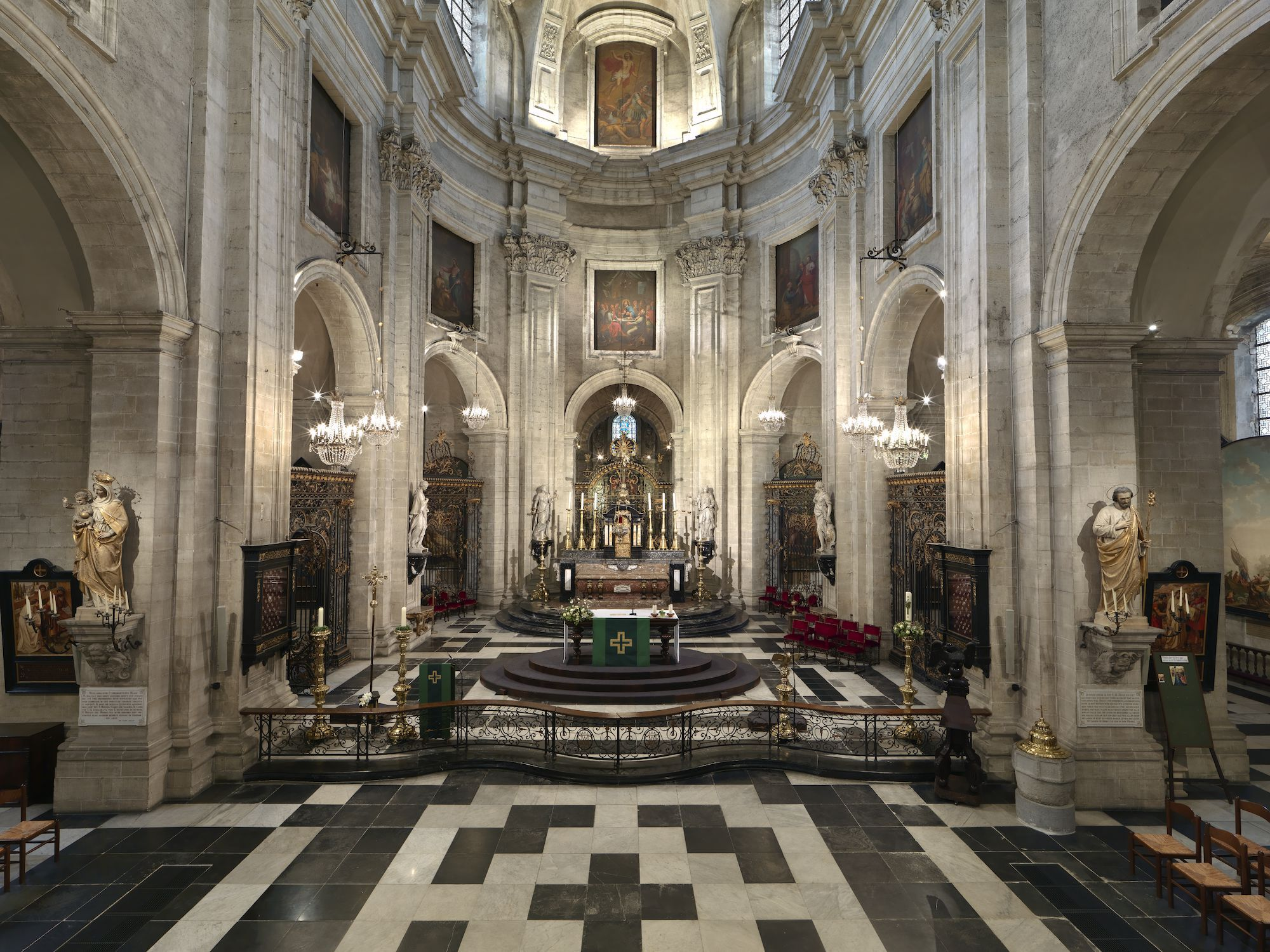
Main Altar

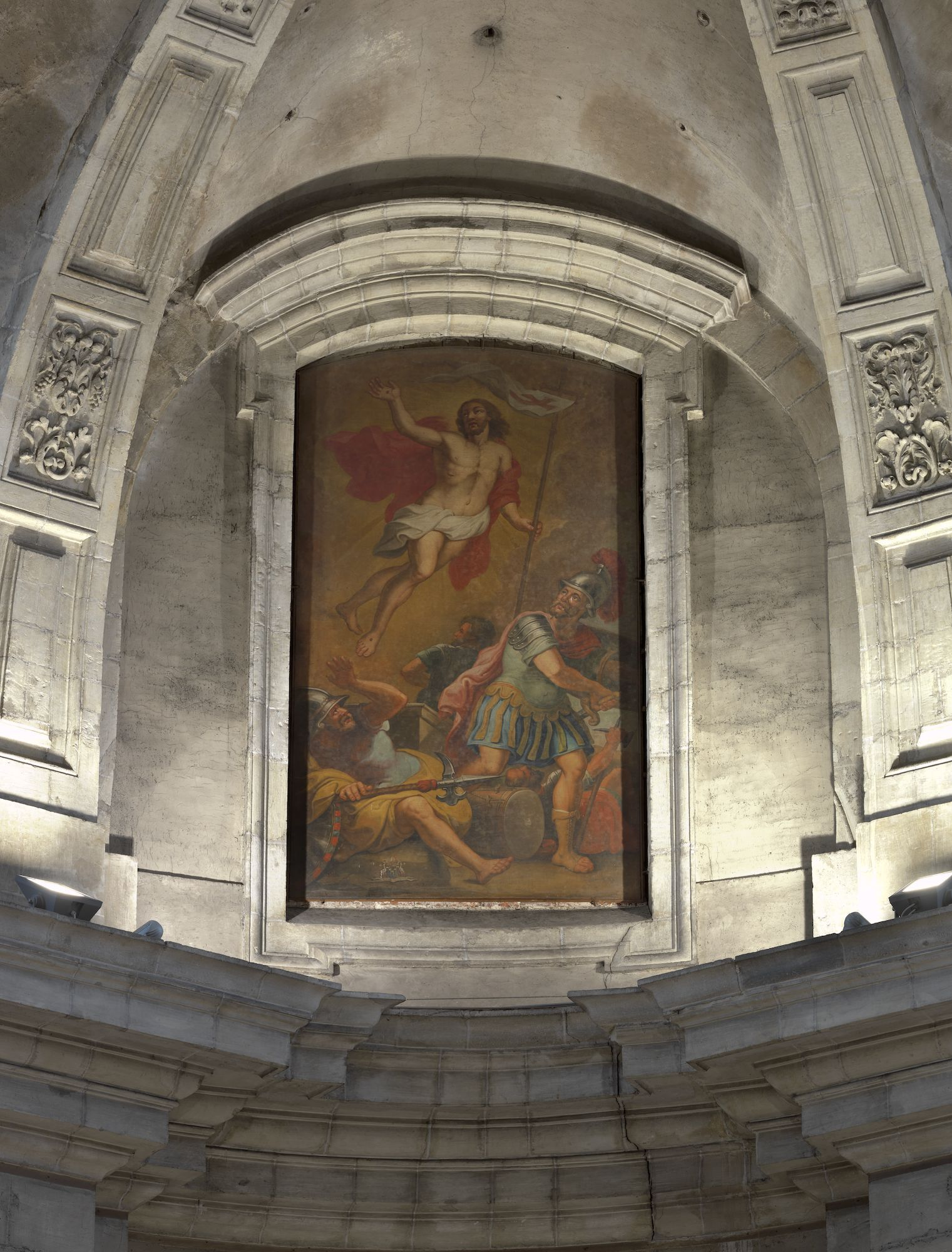
Interior view of the church

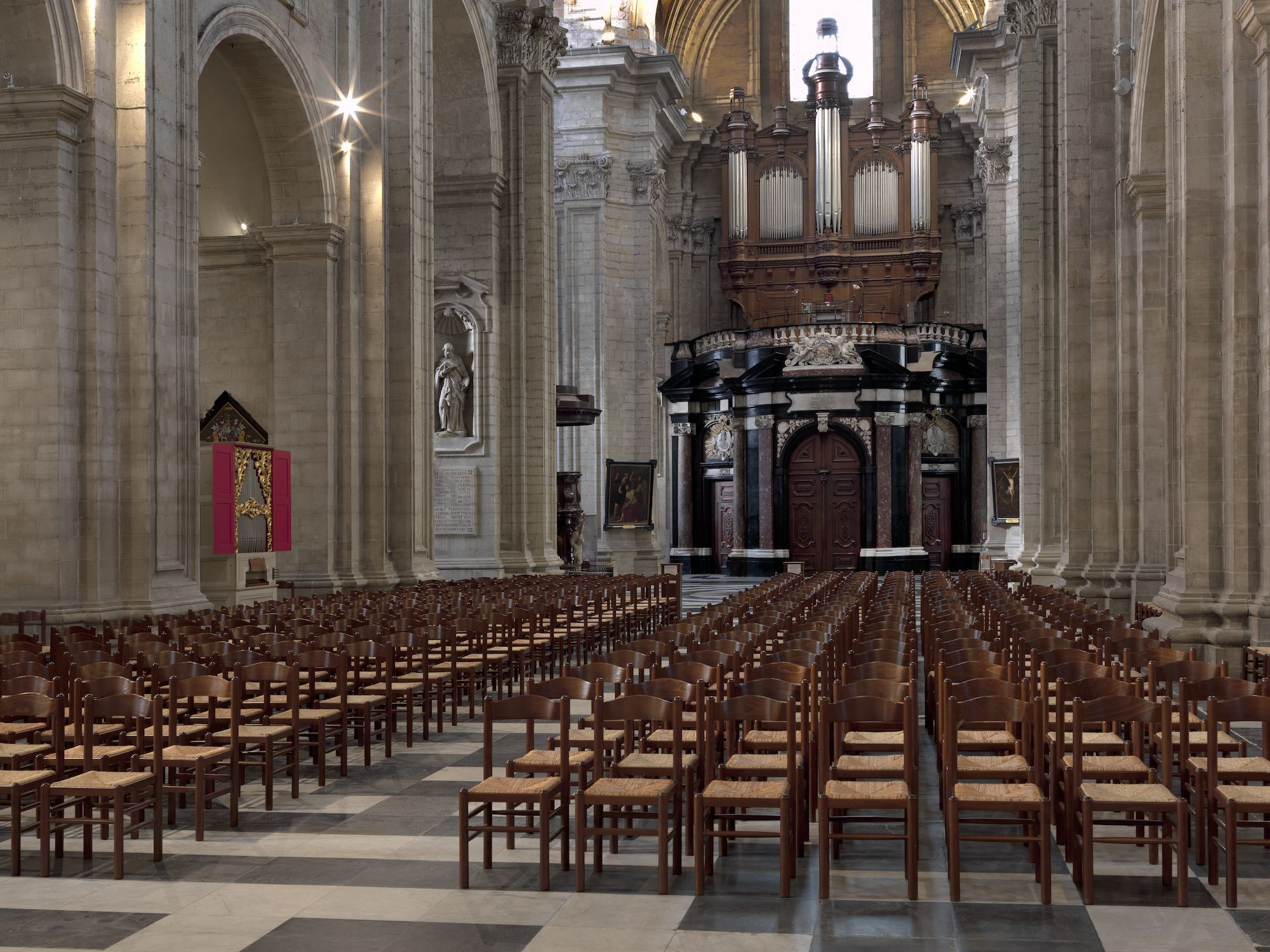
Interior view of the church

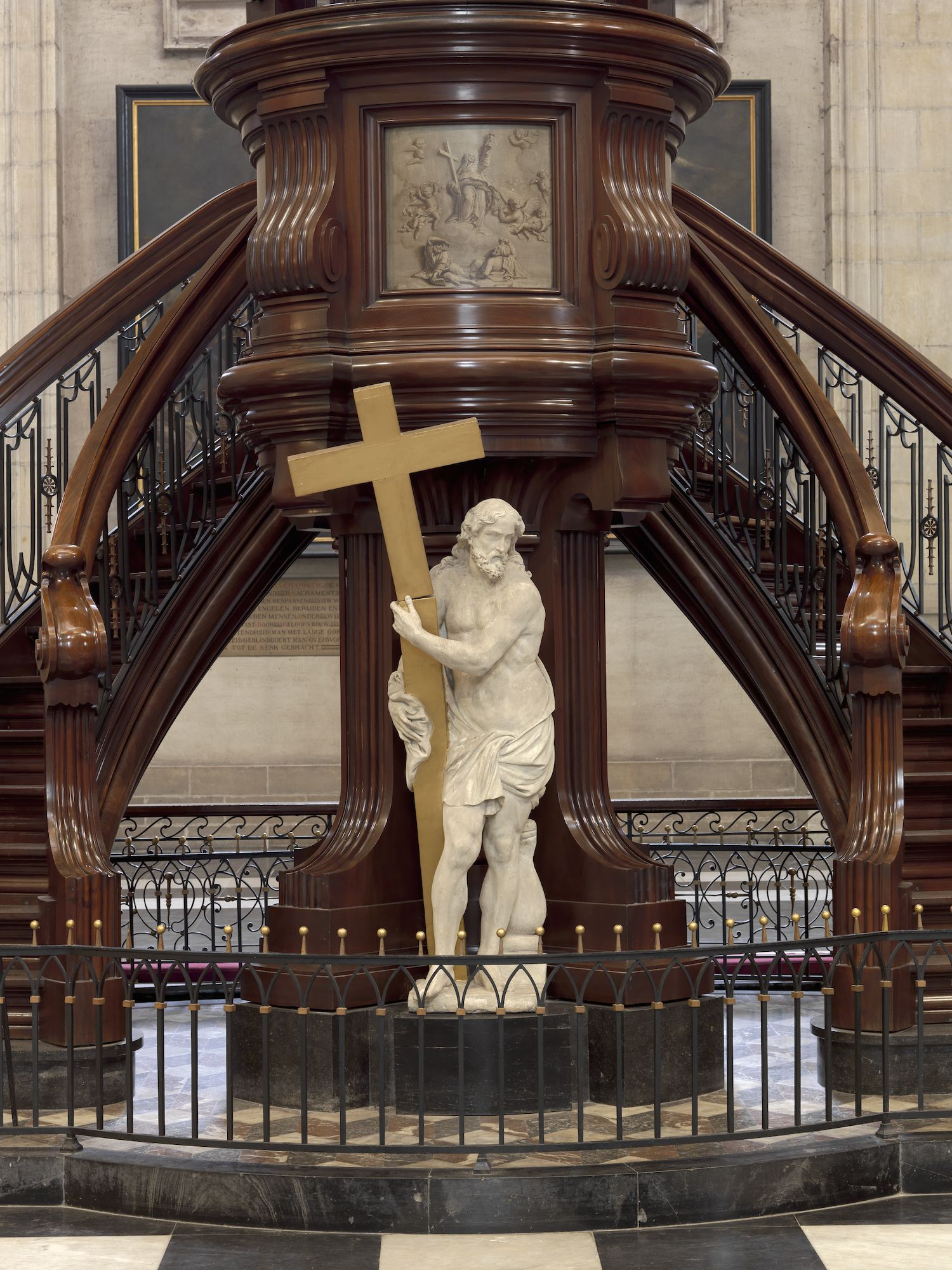
Interior view of the church

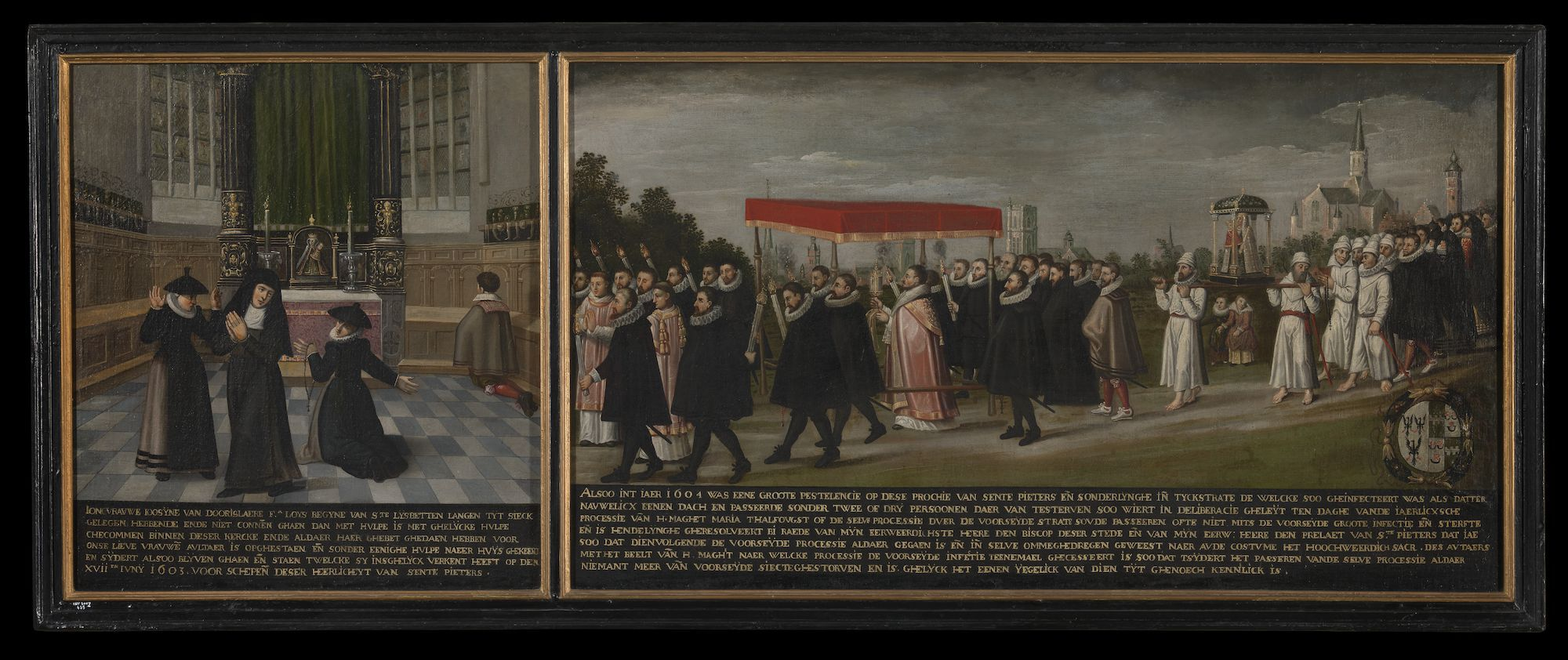
Healing and procession against the plague in 1604

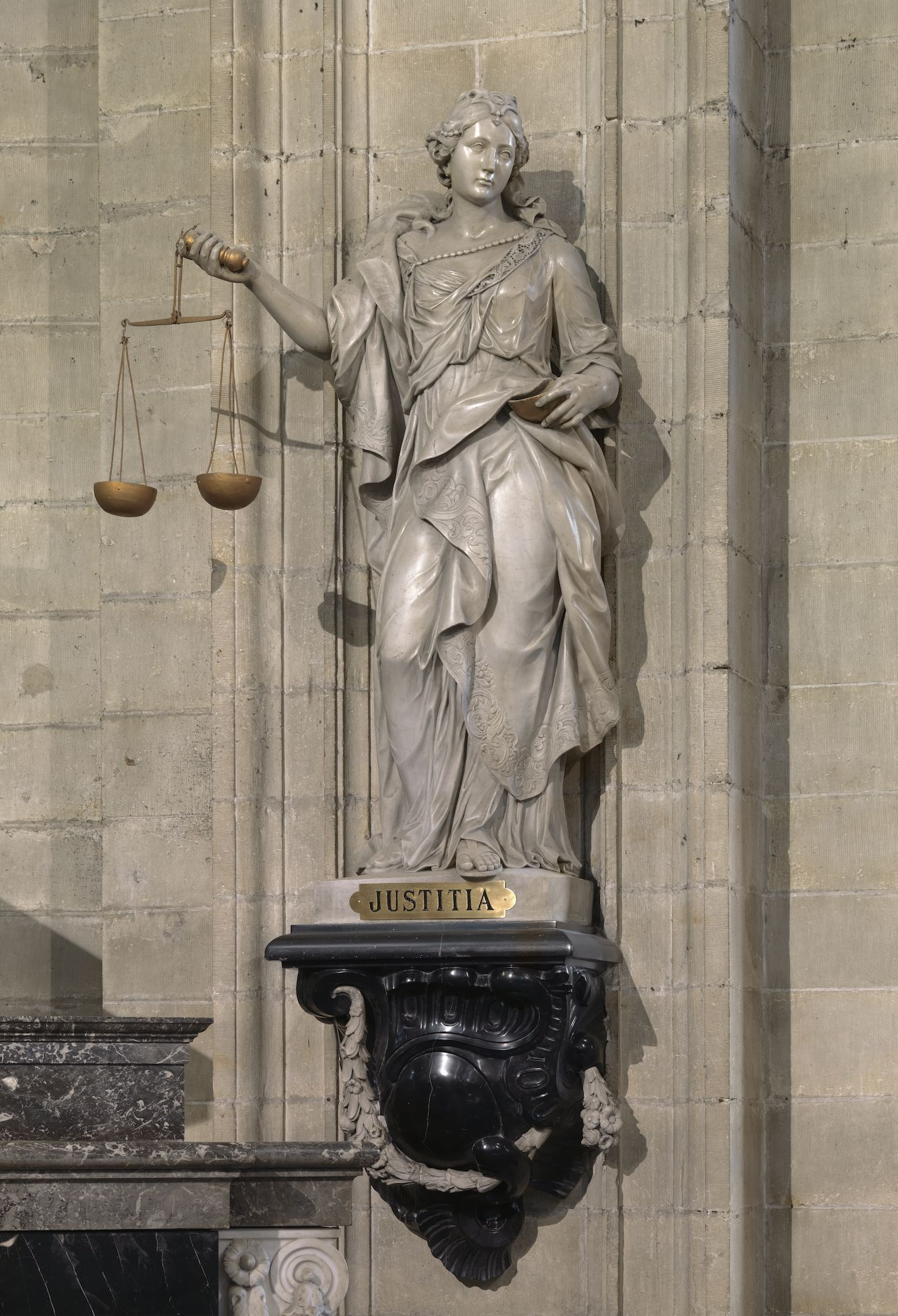
Four virtues Justice

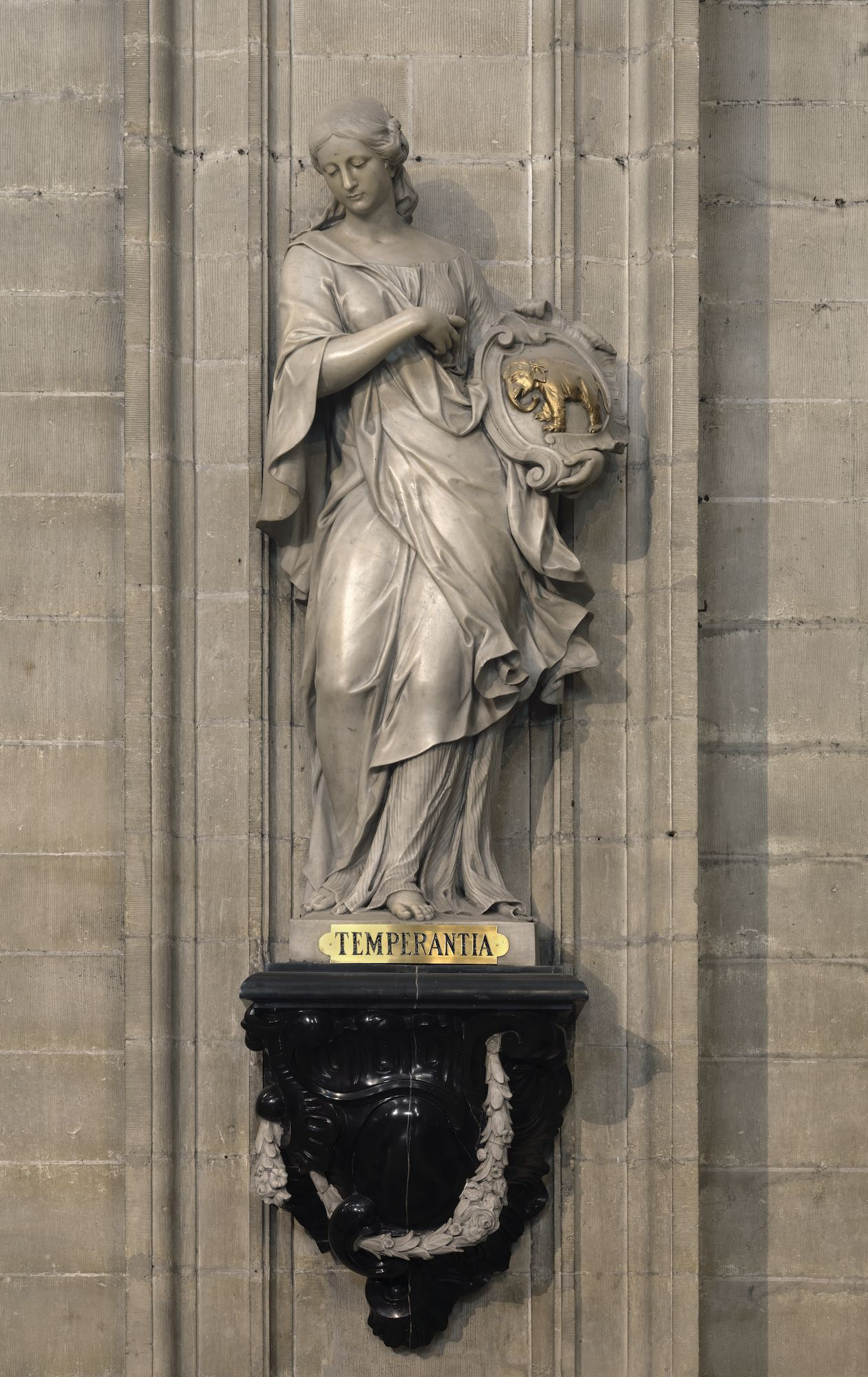
Four virtues Temperance

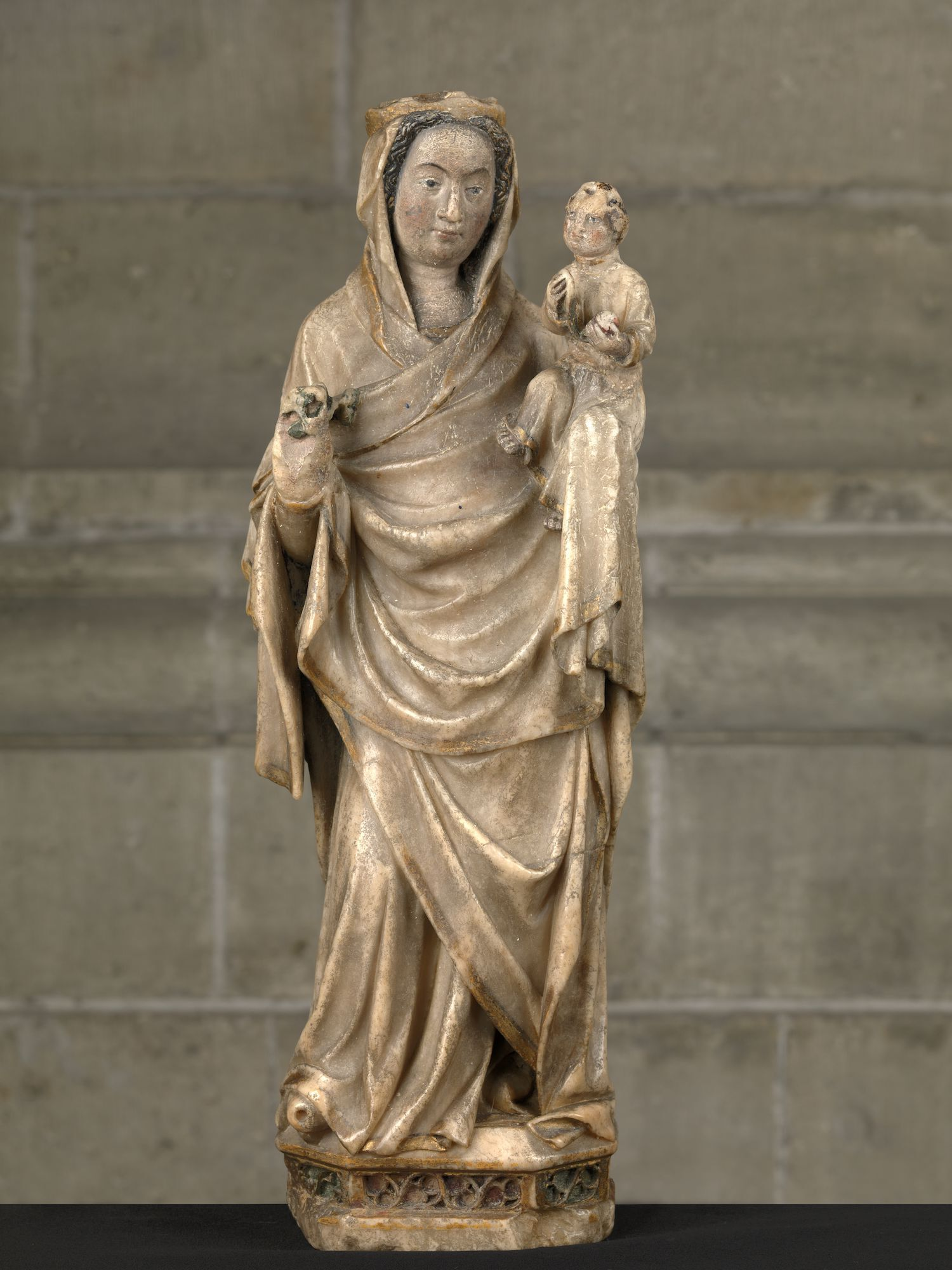
Standing Mary with Child

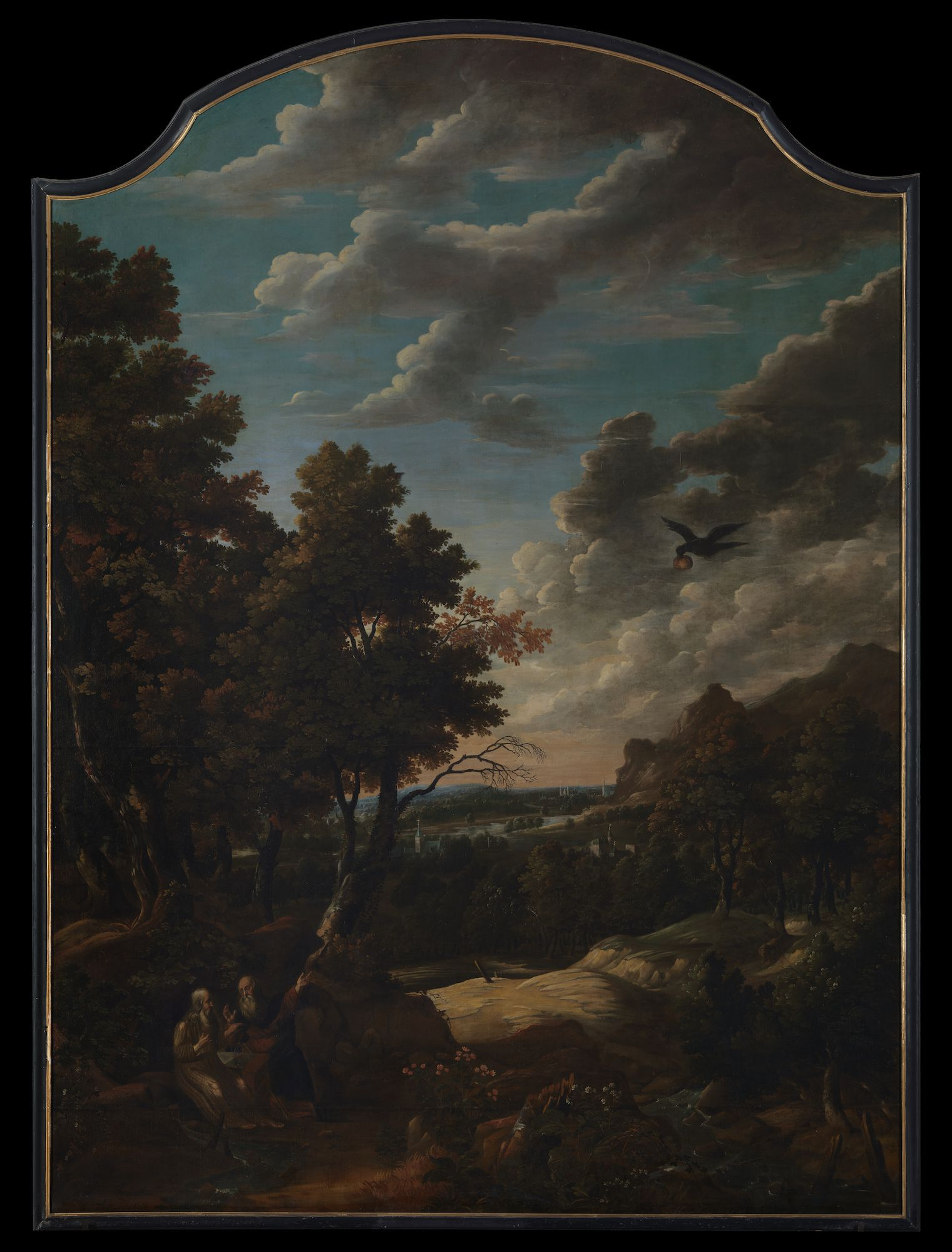
Saints Anthony and Paul fed by a raven

== Burials ==
- Baldwin II, Margrave of Flanders
- Ælfthryth, Countess of Flanders
- Arnulf I, Count of Flanders
- Adele of Vermandois
- Baldwin III, Count of Flanders
- Arnulf II, Count of Flanders
- Rozala of Italy
- Ogive of Luxembourg
- Godfrey I, Count of Verdun
- Lu Zhengxiang

Isabella of Austria was buried at St. Peter's from her death in 1526 until 1883, when her remains were transferred to Odense Cathedral to lay alongside her husband Christian II of Denmark. Also transferred in 1883 were the remains of her son John, who died in 1532.

== See also ==
- 17th-century Western domes

== Sources ==
- Declercq, Georges (1 January 2010). "From Private Charter to Princely Diploma. The Charters of the First Counts of Flanders (especially for St Peter's Abbey, Ghent)". Bulletin de la Commission royale d'Histoire. 176 (2): 5.
