= Baldwin IV of Flanders =

Count of Flanders from 987 to 1035

Baldwin IV

Count of Flanders
- Reign: 988 – 30 May 1035
- Predecessor: Arnulf II
- Successor: Baldwin V
- Born: 980
- Died: 30 May 1035
- Noble family: Flanders
- Spouses: Ogive of Luxembourg; Eleanor of Normandy
- Issue: Baldwin V, Count of Flanders; Judith of Flanders, Countess of Northumbria
- Father: Arnulf II, Count of Flanders
- Mother: Rozala of Italy

Baldwin IV (980 – 30 May 1035), called the Bearded, was the count of Flanders from 987 until his death.

Baldwin IV was the son of Count Arnulf II of Flanders (c. 961 — 987) and Rozala of Italy (950/60 – 1003), of the House of Ivrea. He succeeded his father as Count of Flanders in 987, but with his mother Rozala as the regent until his majority.

In contrast to his predecessors Baldwin turned his attention eastward, leaving the southern part of his territory in the hands of his vassals the counts of Guînes, Hesdin, and St. Pol. To the north of the county Baldwin was given Zeeland as a fief by the Holy Roman Emperor Henry II, while on the right bank of the Scheldt river he received Valenciennes (1013) and parts of the Cambresis as well as Saint-Omer and the northern Ternois (1020). In his French territories, the supremacy of Baldwin remained unchallenged. A great deal of colonization of marshland was organized along the coastline of Flanders and the harbour and city of Brugge were enlarged.

Baldwin first married Ogive, daughter of Frederick of Luxembourg, by whom he had a son and heir, Baldwin V (1012 – 1067). In 1028 he arranged the marriage of his son Baldwin V with Adela of France, daughter of the French king Robert II of France. The marriage took place in Paris, in the presence of all the peers of the kingdom and five bishops. Two years later Baldwin V rebelled against his father for unknown reasons, but the younger Baldwin received the support of the nobleman in Flanders and the elder Baldwin fled to the court of Robert I of Normandy. Robert intervened on behalf of the elder Baldwin and could restore him to power and reconcile him with his son.

Ogive had died on 21 February 1030 and later that year, at the conclusion of the rebellion and as a result of the good relations with the Duke of Normandy, Baldwin remarried with Eleanor, a younger sister of Robert, by whom he had a daughter, Judith.

Baldwin IV died on 30 May 1035 and was buried in Saint Peter's Abbey in Ghent.

== See also ==
- Counts of Flanders family tree

== Sources ==
- De Maesschalck, Edward (2019). De Graven van Vlaanderen (861-1384) [The Counts of Flanders (861-1384)] (in Dutch) (2nd ed.). DavidsFonds / Standaard uitgeverij. ISBN 9789002268458.
- Vanderputten, Steven, ed. (2024). Judith of West Francia, Carolingian Princess and First Countess of Flanders: Biographical Elements and Legacy. Turnhout: Brepols. doi:10.1484/M.STMH-EB.5.132281. ISBN 9782503604619.

Preceded by Arnulf II	Count of Flanders; 987–1035	Succeeded by Baldwin V
