= Counts of Flanders family tree =

This is a family tree of the Counts of Flanders, from 864 to 1792, when the county of Flanders was annexed by France after the French Revolution.

House of Flanders	House of Estridsen	Baldwin I 830s–879 r. 862-879
House of Normandy	House of Alsace	Baldwin II; 865-918 r. 879-918
House of Savoy	House of Dampierre	Arnulf I 890–965 r. 918-965	Adelolf; Count of Boulogne
House of Capet	House of Habsburg	Baldwin III; 940–962 co-r. 958-962	Arnulf II; Count of Boulogne
House of Lorraine	Arnulf II; 960–987 r. 965-987	Arnoulf III; Count of Boulogne
Baldwin IV; 980–1035 r. 987-1035	Balduin II; Count of Boulogne
Baldwin V 1012–1067 r. 1035-1067	Eustace I Count of Boulogne
Baldwin VI; 1030–1070 r. 1067-1070	Robert I 1032-1093 r. 1071-1093	Matilda; Queen of England; 1031-1083	Eustace II; Count of Boulogne	Lambert; Count of Lens
Arnulf III; 1055–1071 r. 1070-1071	Baldwin II, Count of Hainaut; 1056-1098	Robert II; 1065-1111 r. 1093-1111	Adela; Queen of Denmark; 1064-1115	Gertrude, Duchess of Lorraine; 1080-1117	Robert Curthose, Duke of Normandy; 1054-1134	Eustace III; Count of Boulogne	Godfrey; Ruler of Jerusalem	Baldwin I King of Jerusalem
Baldwin III, Count of Hainaut; 1088-1120	Baldwin VII; 1093-1119 r. 1111-1119	Charles I 1083-1127 r. 1119-1127	Theodoric; 1099-1168 r. 1128-1168	William; 1102-1128 r. 1127-1128
Baldwin IV, Count of Hainaut; 1108–1171	Philip I 1143-1191 r. 1168-1191
Baldwin VIII; 1150-1195 r. 1191-1194	Margaret I 1145-1194 r. 1191-1194
Baldwin IX; 1172-1205 r. 1194-1205	Philip I Margrave of Namur	Henry; Latin Emperor of Constantinople	Eustace; Regent of kingdom of Tessalonica
Ferdinand; 1188-1233 r. 1212-1233	Joan; 1194-1244 r. 1205-1244	Thomas; 1199-1259 r. 1237-1244	Margaret II; 1202-1280 r. 1244-1278
Guy; 1226-1305 r. 1278-1305
Robert III; 1249-1322 r. 1305-1322
Louis I, Count of Rethel; 1272-1322
Louis I 1304-1346 r. 1322-1346
Louis II; 1330–1384 r. 1346-1384
Philip II; 1342-1404 r. 1384-1404	Margaret III; 1350–1405 r. 1384-1405
John I 1371–1419 r. 1405-1419
Philip III; 1396–1467 r. 1419-1467
Charles II; 1433–1477 r. 1467-1477
Maximilian; 1459-1519 r. 1477-1482	Mary; 1457–1482 r. 1477-1482
Philip IV; 1478–1506 r. 1482-1506
Charles III; 1500–1558 r. 1506-1555	Ferdinand I, Holy Roman Emperor; 1503-1564
Philip V 1527–1598 r. 1555-1598	Maximilian II, Holy Roman Emperor; 1527-1576	Charles II, Archduke of Austria; 1540-1590
Philip III, King of Spain; 1578-1621	Isabella Clara Eugenia; 1566-1633 r. 1598-1621	Albert; 1559–1621 r. 1598-1621	Ferdinand II, Holy Roman Emperor; 1578-1637
Philip VI; 1605-1665 r. 1621-1665	Maria Anna, Holy Roman Empress; 1606-1646	Ferdinand III, Holy Roman Emperor; 1608-1657
Maria Theresa; Queen of France; 1638-1683	Charles IV; 1661-1700 r. 1665-1700	Leopold I, Holy Roman Emperor; 1640-1705
Louis, Grand Dauphin; 1661-1711	Charles V 1685-1740 r. 1713-1740
Philip VII; 1683-1746 r. 1700-1713	Francis I 1708-1765 r. 1740-1765	Maria Theresa; 1717-1780 r. 1740-1780
Joseph; 1741-1790 r. 1765-1790	Leopold; 1747-1792 r. 1790-1792
Francis II; 1768-1835 r. 1792-1793

== See also ==
Coat of arms of the Counts of Flanders

- County of Flanders - Other family trees
