= Eleanor of Normandy =

Countess consort of Flanders (c.1012–1071)

Countess consort of Flanders
- Tenure: after 1030 – 30 May 1035
- Born: c. 1012
- Died: 1071 (aged 60–61)
- Spouse: Baldwin IV of Flanders
- Issue: Judith
- House: Normandy
- Father: Richard II of Normandy
- Mother: Judith of Brittany

Eleanor of Normandy (c. 1012 – 1071) was Countess of Flanders by marriage to Baldwin IV of Flanders.

She was born between 1011 and 1013 in Normandy, the daughter of Richard II, Duke of Normandy, and Judith of Brittany. Eleanor had two sisters and three brothers, including Robert I, Duke of Normandy, father of William the Conqueror. In 1017, when Eleanor was still a child, her mother Judith died. Duke Richard married Poppa of Envermeu, by whom he had two more sons.

== Marriage and issue ==
In 1031, she married, as his second wife, Baldwin IV, Count of Flanders, who was about 30 years her senior. He had a son and heir, Baldwin, by his first marriage to Ogive of Luxembourg. Eleanor was styled Countess of Flanders upon her marriage to Baldwin, and together they had one daughter:

- Judith (1033 – 5 March 1094), married firstly Tostig Godwinson, Earl of Northumbria, by whom she allegedly had issue; and secondly Welf I, Duke of Bavaria, by whom she had surviving issue.

== Death and legacy ==
Eleanor died in Flanders sometime after 1071. Her husband had died in 1035, two years after the birth of their only child.

Despite her common nomenclature, it is not certain that Eleanor was her proper name. Eleanor of Aquitaine, who lived a century later (and married as her second husband Henry II of England, the 2nd great-grandson of Eleanor of Normandy's brother Robert), is the first individual in recorded history known to bear the name Eleanor.

Preceded by Ogive of Luxembourg	Countess consort of Flanders; 1030–1035	Succeeded by Adela of France
