= Ælfthryth, Countess of Flanders =

Ælfthryth of Wessex
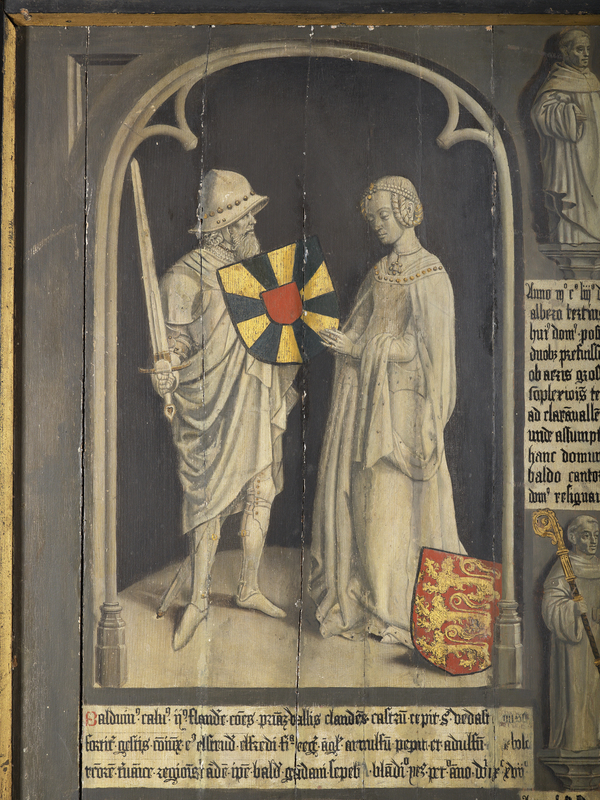
- Count Baldwin II of Flanders and Countess Elftrude (Ælfthryth)

Countess consort of Flanders
- Tenure: 893/899 – 918
- Born: c. 877
- Died: 7 June 929
- Spouse: Baldwin II, Margrave of Flanders
- Issue: Arnulf I of Flanders; Adalulf, Count of Boulogne; Ealswid; Ermentrud
- House: Wessex
- Father: Alfred the Great
- Mother: Ealhswith

Ælfthryth of Wessex (c. 877 – 7 June 929), also known as Elftrudis (Elftrude, Elfrida), was an English princess and a countess consort of Flanders to Baldwin II.

== Life ==
She was the youngest daughter of Alfred the Great, the King of the Anglo-Saxons and his wife Ealhswith. Her siblings included King Edward the Elder and Æthelflæd, Lady of the Mercians. Ælfthryth was educated along with her elder brother Edward, marking a rare instance of a princess getting equal education to a prince.

Between 893 and 899, Ælfthryth married Baldwin II (died 918), Margrave of Flanders. Ælfthryth died on 7 June 929 and was buried next to her husband at Saint Peter's Abbey in Ghent.

They had the following issue:

- Arnulf I of Flanders (d. 964/65); married Adela of Vermandois
- Adalulf, Count of Boulogne (d. 933)
- Ealswid
- Ermentrud

== Sources ==
- Abels, Richard P. (1988). Lordship and Military Obligation in Anglo-Saxon England. British Museum Press. p. 189. ISBN 978-0-7141-0552-9.
- Nicholas, David M (2013). Medieval Flanders. Routledge.
- Vanderputten, Steven, ed. (2024). Judith of West Francia, Carolingian Princess and First Countess of Flanders: Biographical Elements and Legacy. Turnhout: Brepols. doi:10.1484/M.STMH-EB.5.132281. ISBN 9782503604619.

Ælfthryth, Countess of Flanders House of Wessex Born: c. 877 Died: 7 June 929.
| Preceded by Judith of Flanders | Countess consort of Flanders; 893-899 to 918 | Succeeded by Adele of Vermandois |
