= Judith of Flanders =

Queen of Wessex from 856 to 860

Queen consort of Wessex
- Tenure: 856–858
- Tenure: 858–860

Countess consort of Flanders
- Tenure: 862 – 870 or later
- Born: c. 844
- Died: 870 or later
- Spouses: Æthelwulf, King of Wessex (m. 856, died 858) Æthelbald, King of Wessex (m. 858, died 860): Baldwin I, Margrave of Flanders (m. 861/862)
- Issue more...: Baldwin II, Margrave of Flanders
- Dynasty: Carolingian
- Father: Charles the Bald
- Mother: Ermentrude of Orléans

Judith of Flanders (c. 843 – 870 or later) was a Carolingian princess who became Queen of Wessex by two successive marriages and later Countess of Flanders. Judith was the eldest child of the Carolingian emperor Charles the Bald and his first wife, Ermentrude of Orléans. In 856, she married Æthelwulf, King of Wessex. After her husband's death in 858, Judith married his son and successor, Æthelbald. King Ætheldbald died in 860. Both of Judith's first two marriages were childless. Her third marriage was to Baldwin I, Margrave of Flanders, with whom she had several children.

== Ancestry and early life ==
Judith was born around 843 or in early 844 as the eldest child of Charles the Bald, king of West Francia, and his first wife Ermentrude of Orléans (823–869) and was named after her paternal grandmother, Judith of Bavaria. She was a great-granddaughter of Charlemagne.

== Queen of Wessex ==
=== First marriage and coronation ===
In 855, the widower Æthelwulf, King of Wessex (died 858) made a pilgrimage to Rome with his youngest son Alfred (848/849–899). On the way there, he visited the court of Charles the Bald and negotiated for a marriage with 12-year-old Judith, despite probably being in his mid-fifties and having six children, three or five of them older than Judith. He may have been looking for an ally against the Vikings, as both he and Charles had suffered from their attacks, though it has also been suggested he was seeking a strategic coalition against his own sons. Marrying into the prestigious Carolingian dynasty was an additional advantage for Æthelwulf.

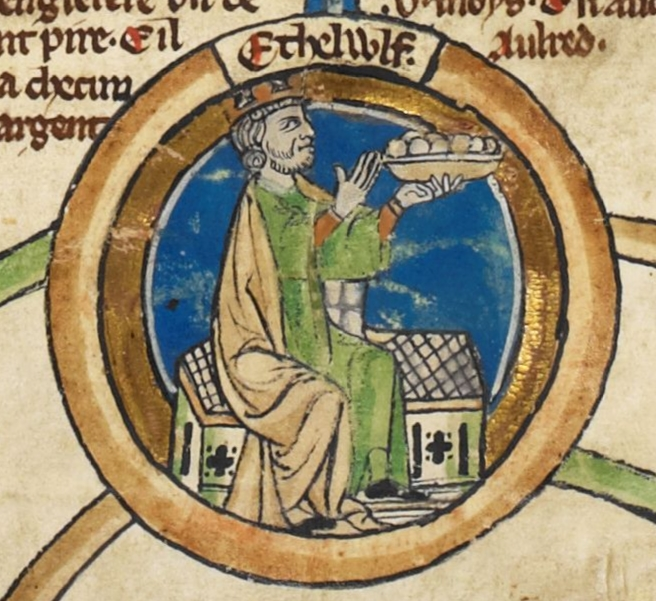
A depiction of King Æthelwulf from the 14th century

On the way back, in 856, he stayed at Charles' court again, and married Judith on 1 October 856 at the royal palace of Verberie-sur-Oise. This was an extraordinary event as Carolingian princesses rarely married and were usually sent to convents. It was practically unprecedented for them to marry foreigners. During the ceremony, Hincmar, archbishop of Rheims, placed a diadem on her head and Æthelwulf conferred the title of queen on her, a title which was not customary in Wessex. According to the customs of Wessex, the wife of a king could not be called queen or sit on the throne with her husband. However, all chroniclers pay attention to the fact that Charles the Bald insisted on the coronation of his daughter, probably wishing to secure her position in her new home:

After the celebrations, Æthelwulf, his new wife and his son returned to Wessex. Judith, a well-educated lady like most Frankish princesses of the time, probably brought the "aura of the Carolingian monarchy" to the court of Wessex. Back in his kingdom, Æthelwulf faced difficulties: his eldest surviving son, Æthelbald, supported by Eahlstan, Bishop of Sherborne and Eanwulf, Ealdorman of Somerset, were conspiring to dethrone him. The marriage with Judith may have played a role in this as Æthelbald probably feared that his father's young wife, the great-granddaughter of Charlemagne, would give birth to a higher-born heir than himself. In addition, some of the nobles were outraged that Judith was crowned and called queen, contrary to local custom.

According to other explanations, Æthelbald had already been rebelling before his father's new marriage, and this was why Æthelwulf stayed at the court of Charles the Bald and married his daughter, demonstrating to his subjects that he had strong supporters abroad. In the end, father and son negotiated a compromise under which Æthelwulf kept the eastern districts of the kingdom and Æthelbald received the western. It is not known whether this meant that Æthelwulf took Kent and Æthelbald Wessex, or Wessex itself was divided.

Judith had no children by Æthelwulf, who died on 13 January 858.

=== Controversial second marriage ===
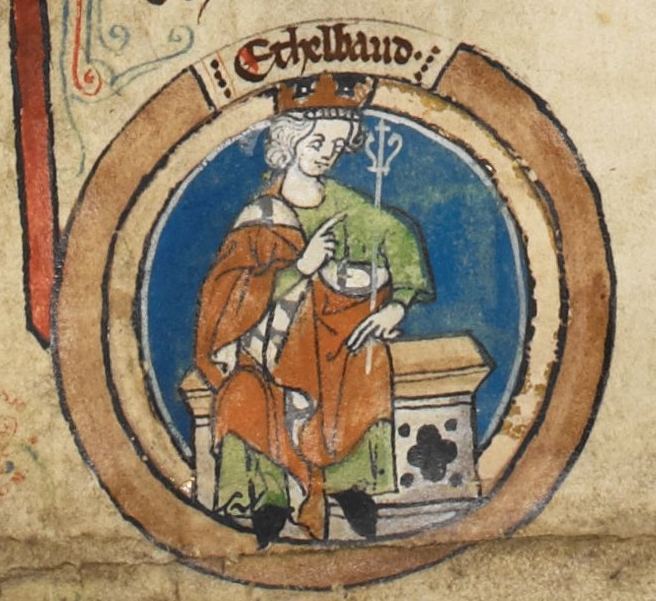
A depiction of King Æthelbald from the 14th century

Upon the death of Æthelwulf, Æthelbald succeeded him on the throne of Wessex and married his stepmother. By agreeing to this marriage, Judith may have tried to avoid the usual fate of widows, being sent to a convent. To Æthelbald, this marriage was advantageous both because Judith belonged to the Carolingian dynasty and because she had already been consecrated as a queen, the marriage thus enhancing his status and placing him above his brothers. Judith's name appears in several charters during the reign of Æthelbald, including in S1274 as regina, which confirms her continued exceptional status. Asser, Bishop of Sherborne condemned the marriage in his Life of Alfred the Great:

Once King Æthelwulf was dead, Æthelbald, his son, against God's prohibition and Christian dignity, and also contrary to the practice of all pagans, took over his father's marriage-bed and married Judith, daughter of Charles, king of the Franks, incurring great disgrace from all who heard of it.

Asser's additional comment on the "great disgrace" was not reflected in contemporary Frankish records. His assertion that such a marriage is contrary to even pagan practice is refuted by the marriage of Eadbald, King of Kent (died 640) to his father's widow Emma of Austrasia in 616. Judith was still childless when Æthelbald died on 20 December 860, after a reign and marriage of two and a half years.

Æthelbald's death left Judith with no future in Wessex. She was still no more than seventeen years old and childless. According to the Annals of St Bertin and Flodoard, she

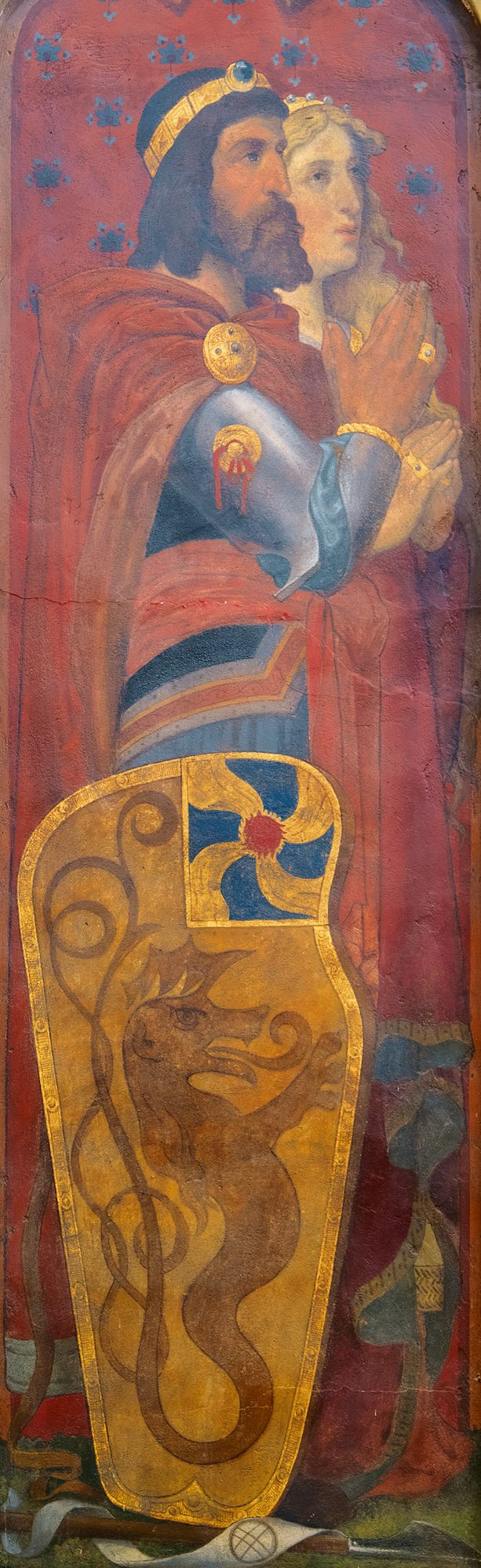
Baldwin I of Flanders and his wife Judith of France, by Jan van der Asselt, ca. 1372/73. Currently displayed at the Gravenkapel, Kortrijk, Belgium.

sold the property that she had acquired and returned to her father, who sent her to the monastery at Senlis, where she was to remain under his royal protection and episcopal guardianship, with all the honour due to a queen, until such time as, if she could not remain chaste, she might marry in the way the apostle said, that is suitable and legal.

— Flodoard

== Third marriage ==
=== Elopement ===
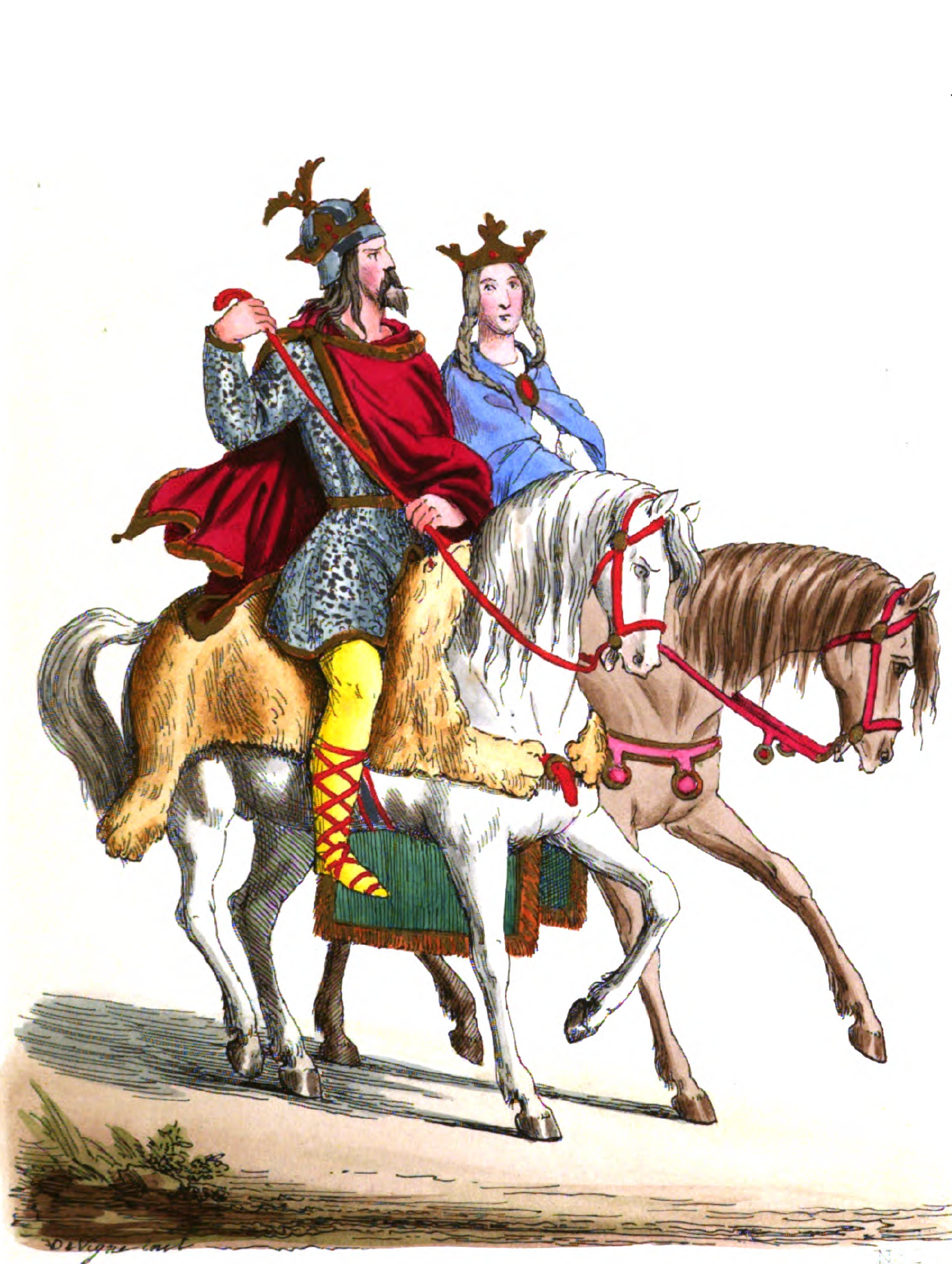
An 1849 depiction of the elopement of Baldwin and Judith by Félix de Vigne

In spring 862, Judith eloped with Baldwin, with the consent of her brother Louis, who was also residing at Senlis at the time. Baldwin was an unknown at the time, there are no sources that mention him before the elopement. Baldwin probably sought to improve his social standing by marrying a Carolingian princess. There are similar contemporary stories of elopement which show that this practise was not exceptional. Judith probably sought to avoid being married off to a political ally of her father, and lose her financial independence which she had gained after selling her English property. In the same year, two brothers of Judith rebelled against their father and married against their father's will.

According to the Annals of St Bertin: "Charles now learned that she had put off her widow's clothing and gone off with Count Baldwin, at his instigation and with her brother Louis's consent."

Flodoard's description is similar:

Judith followed Count Baldwin with the assistance and consent of her brother Louis.

— Flodoard, Annals

The couple probably married in the monastery of Senlis before eloping.

=== Excommunication ===
Judith's father was furious because of the elopement. He immediately organised search parties to bring her home and capture Baldwin. Flodoard mentioned a letter from Archbishop Hincmar of Reims to Bishop Hunger of Utrecht in which he informed Hunger of Baldwin's excommunication for kidnapping Judith and marrying her without royal consent. Contemporary chronicles state that in 862 Charles the Bald held a council with the bishops and nobles of his kingdom. According to the Annals of St Bertin, the king asked the bishops to pass a canonical verdict on Baldwin and Judith, "according to the edicts of the blessed Gregory to the effect that 'if anyone shall have stolen away a widow to become his wife, let him and all who consent to the deed be anathema'".

Meanwhile, Judith and Baldwin sought refuge with the Viking Rorik of Dorestad, King of Friesland (circa 810 – circa 880) and later fled to the court of Judith's paternal cousin Lothair II, King of Lotharingia. Eventually, they travelled to Rome in order to plead their case to Pope Nicholas I.

=== Reconciliation with her father ===
In Rome, Judith and Baldwin negotiated with the pope. He listened to their arguments and sent his legates Radoald, Bishop of Porto and John, Bishop of Cervia to her father. They asked Charles to recognize the marriage as legally binding and welcome the young couple, but Charles and Archbishop Hincmar were not easy to convince. In a letter dated to 23 November 862, the Pope expressed his fear that Baldwin might have already joined forces with the "Jute prince Rorik." Rorik had already fought against King Charles on the side of his brother Lothair I, then-Emperor of the Romans (795–855). According to Flodoard, in 863

Hincmar, Archbishop of Reims, reminded Hunger [Bishop of Utrecht] that the Norman Rorik could help Baldwin, who had kidnapped the beautiful Judith.

— Flodoard, Annals

According to the later chronicler Albert of Stade, Bishop Hunger turned to Rorik urging him not to provide any support to Baldwin.

In October 863 King Charles forgave his daughter in response to an appeal from the Pope and allowed her to be formally married to Baldwin. The king was not present, but gave Baldwin the title of count and the pagi of Flanders and Waas, making him a peer of the kingdom. At some stage, Baldwin may have also acquired the pagi of Ternois, Mempiscus, Aardenburg, Ghent and Courtrai, and the lay abbacy of Saint Peter in Ghent and the cella of Torhout.

=== Margravine of Flanders ===
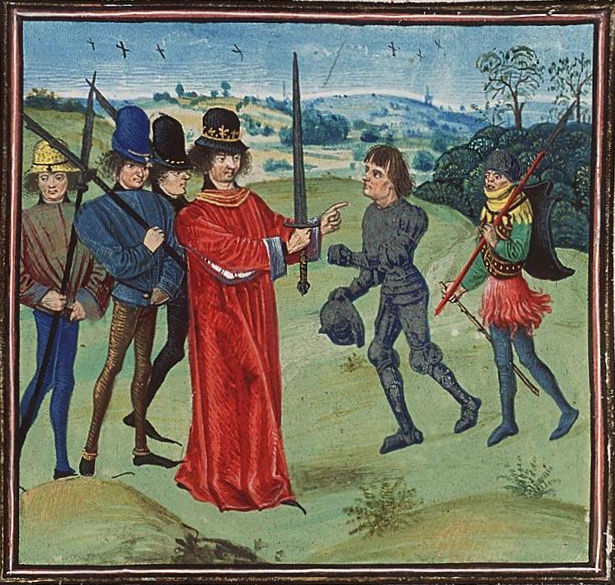
A depiction of the institution of Baldwin as Margrave of Flanders from circa 1450-1460 by Ægidius of Roya

Some scholars have suggested that the king hoped for Baldwin's early death by giving him land just south of the Scheldt river, a region frequently attacked by the Vikings. Baldwin, however, managed the situation well, and became a faithful supporter of his father-in-law. His possessions would become known as the County of Flanders, one of the most powerful domains in France.

Between 893 and 899, her eldest surviving son Baldwin II married Ælfthryth, daughter of Alfred the Great, King of the Anglo-Saxons (previously King of Wessex), son of Judith's first husband and brother of the second. If Judith was alive at this time, she probably played an instrumental role in the marriage negotiations due to her knowledge of the Wessex court.

There are no sources that mention Judith after her elopement with Baldwin, not even the date of her death or place of burial was recorded. Judith's husband Baldwin died in 879 in Arras and was buried in the abbey of Saint-Bertin near Saint-Omer. As the abbey of Saint-Bertin did not allow women to enter the abbey, not even for burial, the successor of Baldwin I, his son Baldwin II was buried at the abbey of Saint-Peter in Ghent, on the request of his widow Ælfthryth. All next four successive counts of Flanders were buried with their spouses at this abbey, making it the necropolis of the counts of Flanders. The discovery of a number of graves in 2006 of seven elite tombs in the entrance of the old church of Saint-Peter, one containing the remains of a middle-aged women, led to speculation if the grave of Judith was finally discovered.

If Judith were still alive at the time of Baldwin I's death, it is likely that she would have opposed just like Ælfthryth, the burial at a site which made it impossible for her to be buried alongside her husband. Also, no donation for the salvation of his soul was recorded in Saint-Bertain by its contemporary chronicler Folcuin in his "Gesta abbatum Sithiensium", something Judith certainly was expected to do. The absence of sources regarding the death and burial of Judith strongly indicates she was not buried in Flanders, since she was already at the time of her grandson Arnulf I recognized as the matriarch of the dynasty of the counts of Flanders, and any abbey, like Sint-Peter, owning her tomb would have highlighted that.

== Legacy ==
The anointing and coronation of Judith as Queen of Wessex allowed the restoration of the status of wives of kings and improved their position.

In the middle of the 10th century, Judith was described by Witger, the compiler of the "Genealogia Arnulfi comitis Flandriae", the genealogy of the counts of Flanders, as "the wisest and most beautiful". She was viewed as the founding mother of the Flemish dynasty, who brought prestige to the counts of Flanders by her direct Carolingian ancestry.

== Issue ==
From her marriage with Baldwin I of Flanders, Judith had at least two sons:

- Baldwin (c. 865/867 – c. 10 September 918), named after his father and succeeded him in 879 as Baldwin II, Margrave of Flanders. He married Ælfthryth of Wessex between 893 and 899.
- Ralph (c. 867/870 – 17 June 896), recorded as "Rodolphus Cameracensis comes" in the Cartulaire de Saint-Bertin. who became count of Cambrai around 888; he and his brother attacked Vermandois and captured Arras, Saint-Quentin and Peronne. But in 896 Herbert I of Vermandois with the support of the royal army, recaptured these town and Ralph was killed during battle.

In addition, a third son and two daughters are sometimes attributed to Judith and Baldwin, although all of these accounts should be treated with caution as they are based on unreliable sources:

- Charles (c. 864/865 – ?), named after his maternal grandfather. He was first recorded in a book Flandicarum rerum tomi X published by an antiquarian Jacob De Meyere in 1531. Jacob did not provide sources, and in fact it would have been quite audacious for Baldwin and Judith to give their child the name Charles, since in the ninth century it was a name reserved for kings only. This claim of the existence of a third son has been repeated in subsequent works : for example, Charles was recorded as "Karolus brevis vite" in the list of counts of Flanders in the Cartulaire de Saint-Bertin compiled in 1840. Vanderputten assumes that the name had been added to the Flandicarum rerum tomi X in some medieval confusion, and doubts whether Charles existed at all.
- The mother of Walter. The History of Waulsort Monastery speaks of a "Walterus...Rodulfi sororis filius" (Walter, son of Ralph's sister), recording that he attempted to avenge the death of his maternal uncle, Ralph of Cambrai. No other reference to this person has been found.

== Bibliography ==
- Aleksashin, S.S. (2016). "К вопросу о христианстве Рорика Фрисляндского" (PDF). In Т.А. Шрадер; et al. (eds.). Скандинавские чтения 2014 года : этнографические и культурно-исторические аспекты (in Russian). СПб.: МАЭ РАН. pp. 30–41. ISBN 978-5-88431-307-1.
- De Maesschalck, Edward (2019). De Graven van Vlaanderen (861-1384) [The Counts of Flanders (861-1384)] (in Dutch) (2nd ed.). DavidsFonds / Standaard uitgeverij. ISBN 9789002268458.
- Enright, M. (1979). "Charles the Bald and Aethelwulf of Wessex: the alliance of 856 and strategies of royal succession". Journal of Medieval History. 5 (4) (Journal of Medieval History ed.): 291–302. doi:10.1016/0304-4181(79)90003-4. ISSN 0304-4181.
- Firth, Matthew (2024). Early English Queens, 850-1000: Potestas Reginae. London: Routledge. doi:10.4324/9781003165453. ISBN 978-0-3677-6093-9.
- Freedman P. (1988). "Cowardice, Heroism and the Legendary Origins of Catalonia". Past & Present (121) (Past & Present ed.): 3–28. doi:10.1093/past/121.1.3. JSTOR 650909.
- Geary, Patrick J. (2009). Women at the Beginning: Origin Myths from the Amazons to the Virgin Mary. Princeton University Press. ISBN 978-1400827084.
- Gilliat-Smith, Ernest (1901). The story of Bruges. London : J. M. Den & Co.
- Humble, Richard. The Saxon Kings. London: Weidenfeld and Nicolson, 1980
- Keynes, Simon; Lapidge, Michael, eds. (1983). Alfred the Great: Asser's Life of King Alfred & Other Contemporary Sources. London, UK: Penguin Classics. ISBN 978-0-14-044409-4.
- Kirby D. P. (2000). The Earliest English Kings. Psychology Press. ISBN 9780415242103.
- MacLean, Simon (2017). Ottonian Queenship. Oxford: Oxford University Press. ISBN 978-0-19-880010-1.
- Nelson, Janet, ed. (1991). The Annals of St-Bertin. Manchester, UK: Manchester University Press. ISBN 978-0-7190-3426-8.
- Nelson, Janet (1992). Charles the Bald. London, UK: Longman. ISBN 978-0-582-05585-8.
- Nelson, Janet (2004). "Æthelwulf (d. 858)". Oxford Dictionary of National Biography. Oxford University Press. doi:10.1093/ref:odnb/8921. (subscription, Wikipedia Library access or UK public library membership required)
- Panton J. (24 February 2011). Historical Dictionary of the British Monarchy. Scarecrow Press. p. 288. ISBN 9780810874978.
- Próspero de Bofarull y Mascaró (1836). Los condes de Barcelona vindicados, y cronología y genealogía delos reyes de España considerados como soberanos independientes de su marca. J. Oliveres y Monmany.
- Stafford, P. (1978). "Sons and Mothers: Family Politics in the Early Middle Ages". Studies in Church History. Subsidia. 1 (Studies in Church History Subsidia ed.): 79–100. doi:10.1017/S014304590000034X. ISSN 0143-0459.
- Stafford, P. (1981). "The King's Wife in Wessex 800–1066". Past and Present (91) (Past and Present ed.): 3–27. doi:10.1093/past/91.1.3. ISSN 0031-2746.
- Story, J. (2003). Carolingian Connections: Anglo-Saxon England and Carolingian Francia, C. 750-870. Ashgate. ISBN 9780754601241.
- Vanderputten, Steven, ed. (2024). Judith of West Francia, Carolingian Princess and First Countess of Flanders: Biographical Elements and Legacy. Turnhout: Brepols. doi:10.1484/M.STMH-EB.5.132281. ISBN 9782503604619.
- Ward, J. (2006). Women in England in the Middle Ages. A&C Black. ISBN 9781852853464.
- Williams, Ann; Smyth, A. P.; Kirby, D. P. (1991). A Biographical Dictionary of Dark Age Britain: England, Scotland, and Wales, C. 500-c. 1050. Psychology Press. ISBN 9781852640477.
- Wormald, Patrick (1982). "The Ninth Century". In Campbell, James (ed.). The Anglo-Saxons. London, UK: Penguin Books. ISBN 9780714821498.
