= Adele of Vermandois =

Countess consort of Flanders
- Tenure: 934 – 10 October 960
- Born: c. 910–915
- Died: 960 (aged 44-50); Bruges
- Spouse: Arnulf I of Flanders
- Issue: Baldwin III of Flanders
- House: Herbertien
- Father: Herbert II of Vermandois
- Mother: Adèle

Adele of Vermandois (bef. 915–960) was both a Carolingian as well as a Robertian Frankish noblewoman who was the Countess of Flanders by marriage (934–960).

== Life ==
Adele, born c. 910–915 was a daughter of Herbert II of Vermandois and his wife, Adele, daughter of Robert I of France. She died in 960 in Bruges.

In 934 Adele married Count Arnulf I of Flanders (c. 890 – 965). Together they had the following children:

- Hildegarde, (Note: It remains uncertain if Hildegarde was Arnulf's daughter by his first wife, whose name was not preserved, or by his second wife Adele. See: Heather J. Tanner, Families, Friends and Allies: Boulogne and Politics in Northern France and England, C.879-1160 (Brill, Leiden, Netherlands, 2004) p. 55 n. 143) born c. 934, died 990; she married Dirk II, Count of Holland.
- Liutgard, born in 935, died in 962; married Wichmann IV, Count of Hamaland.
- Egbert, died 953.
- Baldwin III of Flanders. (c. 940 – 962). Married Mathilde Billung of Saxony (c. 940 – 1008), daughter of Hermann Billung, and had issue, Arnulf II, Count of Flanders (c. 960 – 987), who succeeded as count after Arnulf I, skipping one generation.
- Elftrude; married Siegfried, Count of Guînes.

== See also ==
- Counts of Flanders family tree

== Notes ==
Preceded by Ælfthryth, Countess of Flanders	Countess consort of Flanders; 934–960	Succeeded by Mathilde of Saxony
