= Baldwin of Jerusalem =

Baldwin of Jerusalem may refer to:

- Baldwin I of Jerusalem (also Baldwin I of Edessa, 1058?–1118), first king of Jerusalem
- Baldwin II of Jerusalem (also Baldwin II of Edessa, died 1131), King of Jerusalem
- Baldwin III of Jerusalem (1130–1162), King of Jerusalem from 1143 to 1163.
- Baldwin IV of Jerusalem (1161–1185), King of Jerusalem
- Baldwin V of Jerusalem (1177–1186), King of Jerusalem from 1185 to 1186

== See also ==
- Baldwin (name)
