= Arnulf I of Flanders =

Count of Flanders from 918 to 964

Arnulf I
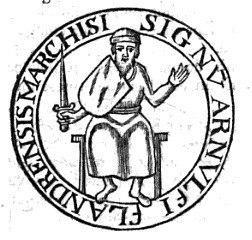
- Seal of Arnulf I

Count of Flanders
- Reign: 918 – 27 March 964
- Successor: Baldwin III; Arnulf II
- Born: between 893 and 899
- Died: 27 March 964 (aged 70–71)
- Noble family: House of Flanders
- Spouse: Adele of Vermandois
- Issue: Baldwin III, Count of Flanders
- Father: Baldwin II of Flanders
- Mother: Ælfthryth of Wessex

Arnulf I (c. 893/899 – 27 March 964), called "the Great", was the first Count of Flanders.

== Life ==
Arnulf was the son of margrave Baldwin II of Flanders and Ælfthryth of Wessex, daughter of Alfred the Great. Through his mother he was a descendant of the Anglo-Saxon kings of England, and through his paternal grandmother Judith of Flanders, a descendant of Charlemagne. Presumably Arnulf was named either after Saint Arnulf of Metz, a progenitor of the Carolingian dynasty, or King Arnulf of Carinthia, whom his father supported. Arnulf titled himself count by the Grace of God.

At the death of their father in 918, Arnulf became Count of Flanders and inherited the historical territories of the County of Flanders, while his brother Adeloft or Adelolf received the territories conquered by his father and became Count of Boulogne and Count of Tournois, and Lay abbot of Saint Bertin. However, in 933 Adeloft died, and Arnulf took the countship of Boulogne for himself.

Arnulf exploited the conflicts between Charles the Simple and Robert I of France, and later those between Louis IV and his barons, to expand Flemish rule to the south, taking all or part of Artois, Ponthieu and Ostrevent, with the cities of Amiens, Arras, Cassel, Boulogne, Tournai and Thérouanne. Arnulf also made Bruges the center of his administration, contributing to the rise of the town as a major trading hub.

In his southern expansion Arnulf inevitably had conflict with the Normans, who were trying to secure their northern frontier. This led to the 942 murder of the Duke of Normandy, William Longsword, at the hands of Arnulf's men. The Viking threat was receding during the later years of Arnulf's life, and he turned his attentions to the reform of the Flemish government.

== Religious reforms ==
Arnulf earned his epithet "The Great" with his religious reforms. He was a strong supporter of the Cluniac Reforms. His motivation was not religious: abbeys owned larges estates, were an economical power, made their lay abbots very rich, and their region prosperous. But in the first half of the tenth century their economical power declined because of looser interpretation of the Rule of Saint Benedict and bad management. In 940 Arnulf appointed Gérard of Brogne as abbot of Saint Peter's Abbey in Ghent, where he enforced monastic discipline by reintroducing the Benedictine rule, and by replacing the canons by monks. Gérard reformed two other major abbeys in the county of Flanders: in 944 the Abbey of Saint Bertin at Saint-Omer and in 946/948 the Saint Bavo's Abbey at Ghent. Gérard retired in October 953 but Arnulf continued the reforms: in 948 the Abbey of Saint-Riquier, in 952 the Saint-Amand Abbey and the Abbey of Saint-Vaast in Atrecht. While the Cluniac reforms insisted on abbeys being completely independend from secular power, and the abbots being appointed by the head of their congregation, Gérard granted these abbeys much autonomy and allowed Arnulfs to interference in their management. These reforms not only re-established these abbeys as economical powers but also stimulated their cultural influence: the first annals of the county of Flanders, the Gesta Abbatum Sithiensium was written by Folcuin in the abbey of Saint-Bertain. When Dunstan, abbot of Glastonbury, fled into exile, Arnulf received him with honour and lodged him in the Abbey of Mont Blandin, near Ghent.

== Family ==
The name of Arnulf's first wife is unknown but he had at least one daughter by her:

- Name unknown; married Isaac of Cambrai. Their son Arnulf succeeded his father as Count of Cambrai.

In 934 he married Adele of Vermandois, daughter of Herbert II of Vermandois. Their children were:

- Hildegard, born c. 934, died 990; she married Dirk II, Count of Holland. It is uncertain whether she is his daughter by his first or second wife.
- Liutgard, born in 935, died in 962; married Wichmann IV, Count of Hamaland.
- Egbert, died 953.
- Baldwin III of Flanders (c. 940 – 962), married Matilda of Saxony († 1008), daughter of Hermann Billung.
- Elftrude; married Siegfried, Count of Guînes.

== Succession ==
Arnulf made his eldest son and heir Baldwin III of Flanders co-ruler in 958, and let him rule the southern parts of Flanders. Baldwin defended the southern frontier against the Normans, and Arnulf retired gradually due to his old age. When Arnulf made preparations with the French king Lothair of France for his succession by Baldwin, a genealogy of the counts of Flanders was produced, in which the blood link between him and the King was stressed. But Baldwin died untimely in 962 because of smallpox, and left only an infant son, also named Arnulf, as sole heir. In order to secure his succession by his grandchild, Baldwin made an agreement with Lothair: in return for all the territory that Baldwin had conquered - Amiens, Ponthieu, Artesia and Ostrevant - Lothair was appointed as guardian of the infant Arnulf and guaranteed that his protégé would inherit the county of Flanders. This agreement also obliged Arnulf to return the territories he had taken from his deceased brother Adalolf to the oldest son of this brother, Arnulf II, Count of Boulogne.

Arnulf died 27 March 964 or 965 (Note: Hellinga and De Maesschalck mention 965, De Donder mentions 864, Vanderputten mentions 864 on p. 29 and 865 on p. 137) and was buried in the Saint-Peter's Abbey in Ghent. King Lothair respected the agreement and sent his mother Gerberga of Saxony and his 12-year old brother Charles, Duke of Lower Lorraine to Flanders to guard Arnulf II.

== See also ==
- Counts of Flanders family tree

== Sources ==
- Arblaster, Paul (2019). A History of the Low Countries. Macmillan Education UK.
- De Donder, Vic (2007). In de naam van Vlaanderen. Een historie (8ste - 21ste eeuw) [In Flanders' name. A history (8th-21st century)] (in Dutch). Leuven: Davidsfonds. ISBN 9789058264985.
- De Maesschalck, Edward (2019). De Graven van Vlaanderen (861-1384) [The Counts of Flanders (861-1384)] (in Dutch) (2nd ed.). DavidsFonds / Standaard uitgeverij. ISBN 9789002268458.
- Hellinga, Gerben Graddesz (2013). Graven Van Vlaanderen [Counts Of Flanders] (in Dutch). Zutphen: Walburg pers. ISBN 9789057309250.
- Murray, Alan V. (2000). The Crusader Kingdom of Jerusalem: A Dynastic History 1099-1125. Prosopographica et Genealogica.
- Nicholas, David M (1992). Medieval Flanders. Routledge.
- Tanner, Heather (2004). Families, Friends and Allies. Brill.55
- Vanderputten, Steven (2013). Monastic Reform as Process. Realities and representations in Medieval Flanders 900-1100. Ithaca and London: Cornell University Press. ISBN 9780801451713.
- Vanderputten, Steven, ed. (2024). Judith of West Francia, Carolingian Princess and First Countess of Flanders: Biographical Elements and Legacy. Turnhout: Brepols. doi:10.1484/M.STMH-EB.5.132281. ISBN 9782503604619.
- Webster, Paul, ed. (2021). History of the Dukes of Normandy and the Kings of England by the Anonymous. Routledge.

== Additional references ==
- Folcwine
- Lambert of Ardres
- Platts, Beryl. The Scottish Hazard: Flemish Nobility and their Impact on Scotland, 1985

Preceded by Baldwin II	Count of Flanders; 918–965 with Baldwin III (958–962)	Succeeded by Arnulf II
Preceded by Adalolphe	Count of Boulogne; 933–964	Succeeded by Arnulf II
