= Adela of France =

Countess of Flanders (1009–1079)

- Countess of Flanders
- Died: 1076; Messines
- Burial: Benedictine Convent of Messines
- Spouse: Richard III, Duke of Normandy; Baldwin V, Count of Flanders
- Issue: Baldwin VI, Count of Flanders; Matilda, Queen of England; Robert I, Count of Flanders
- House: Capet
- Father: Robert II, King of France
- Mother: Constance of Arles

Adela of France, (Note: Other forms of her name are Adèle, Adélaïde, Adelheid, Aelis and Alix.) known also as Adela the Holy or Adela of Messines; (died 1076) was, by marriage, Duchess of Normandy (January – August 1027), and Countess of Flanders (1035–1067).

== Family ==
Adela was the second daughter of King Robert II of France and Constance of Arles. Adela married Count Baldwin V of Flanders in 1028.

== Countess of Flanders ==
Adela managed to gain influence in the policy of Flanders, through her family connections, and was described as very proud of her rank, a pride she passed on to her children. She had been given a higher education than normal for a woman by monks from the St Peter's convent in Ghent and could speak and read Latin, which she taught to her children. It is evident that she was an active political partner of her spouse. Half of the charters issued by him are co-signed by her (often with the title "Sister to the King of France"), which was far from a given thing for a consort. She was particularly active within church reform, such as enforcing the clerical celibacy.

On the death of her brother, King Henry I, the guardianship of his seven-year-old son King Philip I fell jointly on his widow, Anne of Kiev, and on his brother-in-law, Adela's husband, so that from 1060 to 1067, they were regents of France.

Adela had a strong interest in Baldwin V's church reforms and was behind her husband's founding of several collegiate churches. Directly or indirectly, she was responsible for establishing the Colleges of Aire (1049), Lille (1050) and Harelbeke (1064) as well as the abbeys of Messines (1057) and Ename (1063).

== Monastic life ==
After Baldwin's death in 1067, she went to Rome, took the nun's veil from the hands of Pope Alexander II and retired to the Benedictine convent of Messines, near Ypres.

In 1071, Adela's third son, Robert the Frisian, planned to invade Flanders even though at that time the count of Flanders was Adela's grandson, Arnulf III. When she heard about Robert's plans, she asked Philip I to stop him. Philip sent soldiers to support Arnulf including a contingent of ten Norman knights led by William FitzOsborn. Robert's forces attacked Arnulf's numerically superior army at Cassel before it could organize, and Arnulf was killed along with William FitzOsborn. Robert's overwhelming victory led to Philip making peace with Robert and investing him as count. A year later, Philip married Robert's stepdaughter, Bertha of Holland, and in 1074, Philip restored the seigneurie of Corbie to the crown.

Adela died in 1076.

== Family ==
Adela married, in 1028, Baldwin V, Count of Flanders (died 1067). Their children were:

- Baldwin VI, Count of Flanders (c. 1030–1070)
- Matilda of Flanders (c. 1032–1083). In c. 1053 she married William, Duke of Normandy, the future King of England and had issue.
- Robert I, Count of Flanders (c. 1035–1093).

== Sources ==
- Borman, Tracy Joanne (2012). Queen of the Conqueror: The Life of Matilda, Wife of William I. Bantam Books. ISBN 9780553908251.
- Crisp, Ryan Patrick (2005). "Consanguinity and the Saint Aubin Genealogies". In Morillo, Stephen (ed.). The Haskins Society Journal 14: 2003. Studies in Medieval History. Vol. 14. The Boydell Press. pp. 105–116. ISBN 978-1-78204-403-1.
- Hodgson, Natasha R. (2007). Women, Crusading and the Holy Land in Historical Narrative. Vol. 25. The Boydell Press. ISBN 9781843833321.

Adela of France House of Capet Died: 1076
| Preceded by Papia of Envermeu | Duchess consort of Normandy; 1027 | Succeeded by Matilda of Flanders |
| Preceded by Eleanor of Normandy | Countess consort of Flanders; 1036–1067 | Succeeded by Richilde of Hainaut |
