= Rozala of Italy =

Countess of Flanders (968–987) and Queen of the Franks (996)

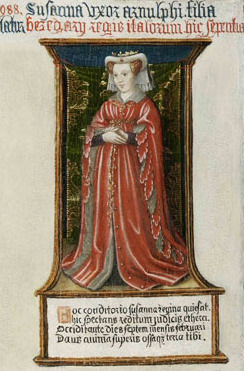

Countess consort of Flanders
- Tenure: 968–987

Queen consort of the Franks
- Tenure: 996
- Born: c. 950–960
- Died: 1003; Ghent
- Spouse: Arnulf II of Flanders; Robert II of France
- Issue: Baldwin IV of Flanders; Mathilda
- House: Ivrea
- Father: Berengar II of Italy
- Mother: Willa of Tuscany

Rozala of Italy (also known as Rozala of Lombardy, Rozala of Ivrea or Susanna of Ivrea; c. 950–960 – 1003) was countess consort of Flanders by marriage to Arnulf II of Flanders, and queen of the Franks by marriage to Robert II of France. She was regent of Flanders in 987–988 during the minority of her son Baldwin IV of Flanders.

== Biography ==
Rozala (Susanna), born sometime between 950 and 960, was the daughter of King Berengar of Ivrea, King of Italy (c. 900 – 966). Her mother was Willa of Tuscany, the daughter of Boso, Margrave of Tuscany and his wife Willa.

In 976, she married Arnulf II, Count of Flanders (d. 987). On her husband's death in 987, she became regent for her young son. She lost the regency the following year, when she married again. Flanders were under threat from France, and to avoid this threat, she arranged a marriage with the son of the king of France. Upon marriage, her regency was turned over to her mother-in-law, her son's paternal grandmother, Matilda of Saxony, countess of Flanders.

On c. 1 April 988, she married, secondly, the much-younger Robert the Pious (972–1031), the Rex Filius of France; the marriage had been arranged by his father Hugh Capet. According to disputed account, she brought her husband Montreuil and Ponthieu as a dowry, others assert that she was bequeathed her right to that territory. Upon her marriage, she took the name of Susannah, and was the queen consort of the co-ruling king Robert, under senior King Hugh.

From 991/992, the couple lived basically separated, because they did not have a good relationship, and because Rozala had become too old (at around 38) to have more children. When her father-in-law died in 996, Robert repudiated her completely, desiring to marry Bertha of Burgundy in her place. That marriage was not lawful because of too close kinship so Robert married a third time, in 1003, with Constance of Arles, who bore him seven children.

Rozala retired back to Flanders, where she died and was buried. Robert retained control of her "dowry", or the rights to the mentioned territory.

== Marriages ==
Rozala was firstly (976–987) married to Arnulf II, Count of Flanders. They had the following children:

- Baldwin IV, Count of Flanders (980–1035)
- Mathilda (d. 995).

Her second marriage (988–996) with Robert II of France did not produce any children.

== Notes ==
Royal titles
Vacant Title last held by Adelaide of Aquitaine	Queen consort of the Franks; 996	Succeeded by Bertha of Burgundy
