= Baldwin II of Flanders =

Margrave of Flanders from 879 to 918

Baldwin II
- Margrave of Flanders
- Born: c. 865
- Died: September 10, 918 (aged 52–53)
- Noble family: House of Flanders
- Spouse: Ælfthryth of Wessex
- Issue: Arnulf I, Count of Flanders; Adelolf, Count of Boulogne; Ealswid; Ermentrud
- Father: Baldwin I of Flanders
- Mother: Judith of Flanders

Baldwin II (c. 865 – 10 September 918) was the second margrave (or count) of Flanders, ruling from 879 to 918. He was nicknamed the Bald (Calvus) after his maternal grandfather, Emperor Charles the Bald.

== Rule ==
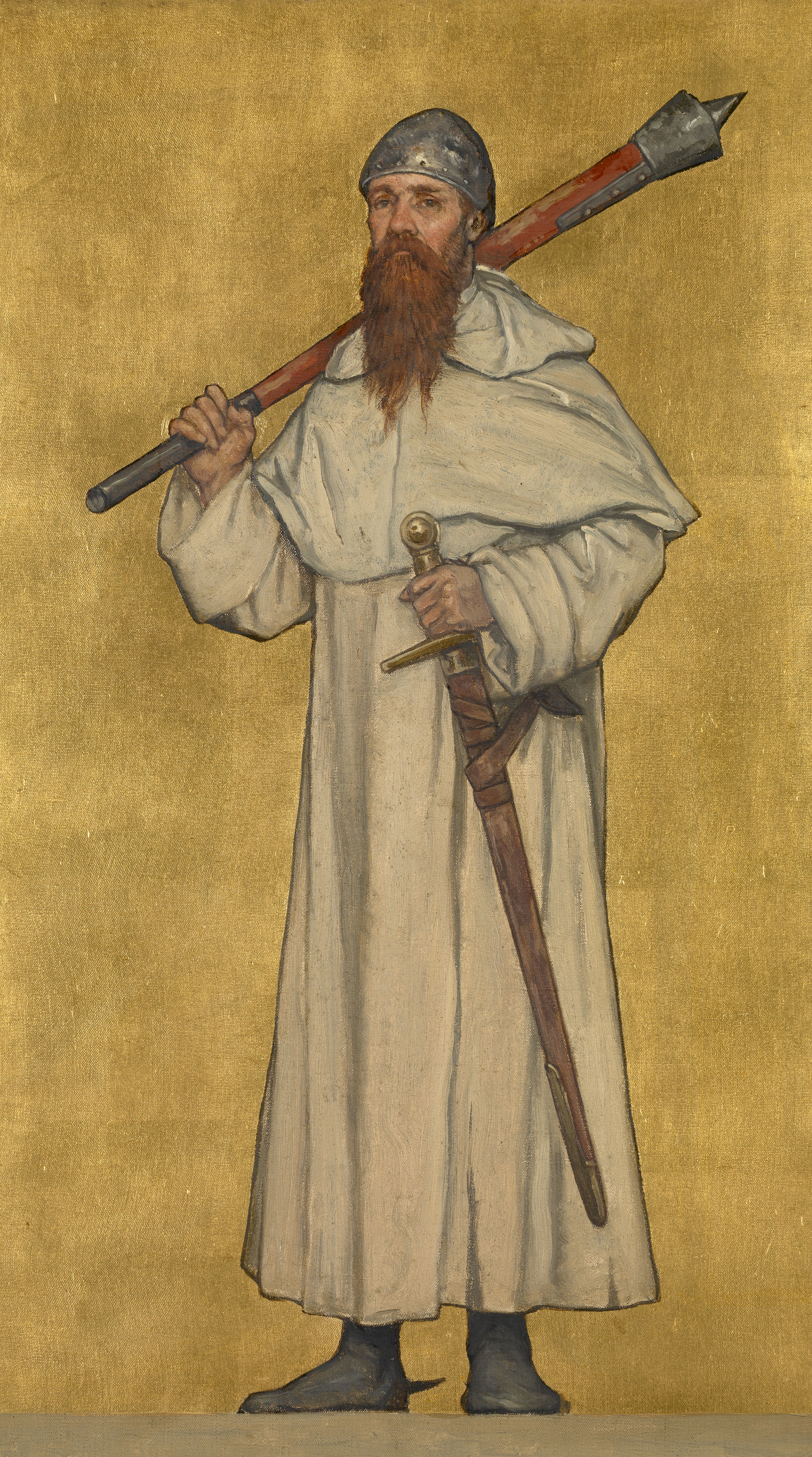
19th century depiction of Baldwin by Albrecht De Vriendt

Baldwin II was born around 865 to Margrave Baldwin I of Flanders and Judith, daughter of Emperor Charles the Bald. The early years of Baldwin II's rule were marked by a series of devastating Viking raids into Flanders. By 883, he was forced to move north to Pagus Flandransis, which became the territory most closely associated with the Counts of Flanders. Baldwin constructed a series of wooden fortifications at Saint-Omer, Bruges, Ghent, and Kortrijk. He then seized lands that were abandoned by royal and ecclesiastical officials. Many of these same citadels later formed castellanies which housed government, militia, and local courts.

In 888, the Western Frankish king, Charles the Fat, was deposed, leaving several candidates vying to replace him. As a grandson of Charles the Bald, who was king of West Francia, Baldwin could have competed for the crown. Instead, Baldwin and others tried to convince the East Frankish king, Arnulf, to take the West Frankish crown, but Arnulf declined.

The Robertine Odo, Count of Paris, was eventually made king. Odo and Baldwin's relationship deteriorated when Odo failed to support Baldwin's attempts to gain control of the Abbey of Saint Bertin. Odo attacked Baldwin at Bruges but was unable to prevail. Baldwin continued his expansion to the south and gained control over Artois, including the important Abbey of St. Vaast.

When the Abbey came under the jurisdiction of Archbishop Fulk of Reims in 900, Baldwin had the archbishop assassinated and was excommunicated by Pope Benedict IV. When his attempts to expand further into the upper Somme River valley were opposed by Herbert I, Count of Vermandois, Baldwin had the count assassinated as well.

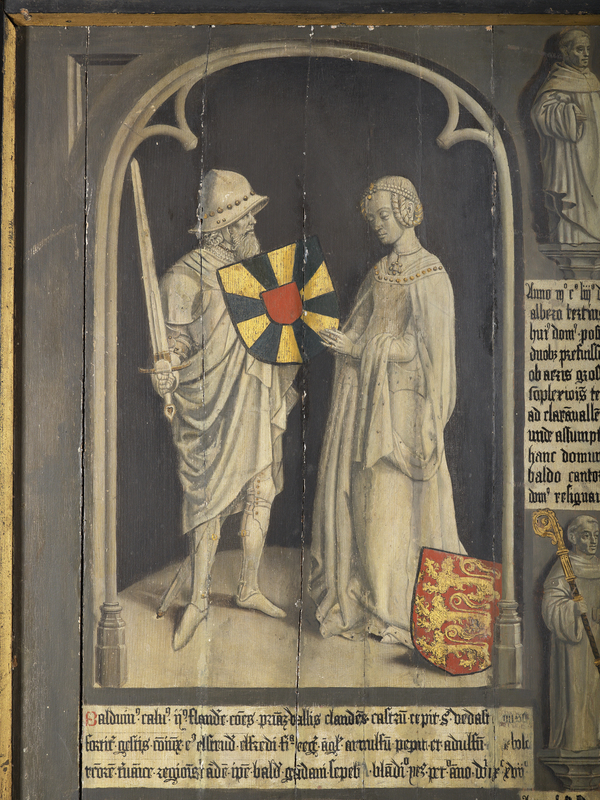
Baldwin II and Ælfthryth

== Marriage ==
Between 893 and 899, Baldwin II married Ælfthryth (or Elftrude or Elfrida or Elftrudis), the daughter of King Alfred the Great of Wessex. The immediate goal of that Anglo-Flemish alliance was to help Baldwin control the lower Canche River valley.

== Death ==
Baldwin died on 10 September 918. Some of his warriors wanted to bury him at the same location as his father in the Abbey of Saint-Bertain, but as this abbey did not allow women to enter even after their death, and since his wife Elftrudis wanted to be buried next to him, Baldwin was finally buried at Saint Peter's Abbey in Ghent. This burial started a tradition that would last five generations, making Ghent the necropolis of the early Count of Flanders.

Baldwin was succeeded by his eldest son, Arnulf I of Flanders. His younger son, Adalulf, became the first Count of Boulogne.

== Family ==
Baldwin II was married to Ælfthryth, daughter of Alfred the Great, and had four children:

- Arnulf I of Flanders (c. 893/99–964/65); married Adela of Vermandois
- Adalulf, Count of Boulogne (c. 893/99 – 933)
- Ealswid
- Ermentrud

== Sources ==
- Nicholas, David M (2013). Medieval Flanders. Routledge.
- Vanderputten, Steven, ed. (2024). Judith of West Francia, Carolingian Princess and First Countess of Flanders: Biographical Elements and Legacy. Turnhout: Brepols. doi:10.1484/M.STMH-EB.5.132281. ISBN 9782503604619.

== Additional references ==
- Folcwine. Gesta Abbatum S. Bertini Sithiensium.
- Glay, Edward Le (1886). Histoire des comtes de Flandre et des Flamands au moyen âge. Desclée.

Preceded by Baldwin I	Margrave of Flanders; 879–918	Succeeded by Arnulf I
