= Arnulf II of Flanders =

Count of Flanders from 965 to 987

Arnulf II

Count of Flanders
- Reign: 965 – 30 March 987
- Predecessor: Arnulf I Baldwin III
- Successor: Baldwin IV
- Born: c. 961
- Died: 30 March 987; Ghent
- Noble family: House of Flanders
- Spouse: Rozala of Italy
- Issue: Baldwin IV, Count of Flanders; Mathilda
- Father: Baldwin III of Flanders
- Mother: Mathilde Billung of Saxony

Arnulf II (960/1 – 30 March 987) was Count of Flanders from 965 until his death.

== Life ==
He was the son of Baldwin III of Flanders and Matilda of Saxony, countess of Flanders, daughter of Herman, Duke of Saxony. His father Baldwin III died in 962, when Arnulf was just an infant, whilst Arnulf's grandfather, Arnulf I, was still alive. When Arnulf I died three years later (965), the regency was held by his kinsman Baldwin Balso, who died in 973.

By the time Arnulf II attained his majority in 976, Flanders had lost some of the southern territory acquired by Arnulf I. The latter had given some parts of Picardy to King Lothar of France to help assure his grandson's succession, and gave Boulogne as a fief to another relative. Then early in Arnulf's minority Lothar had taken Ponthieu and given it to Hugh Capet, and the first counts of Guînes had established themselves. Arnulf died on 30 March 987 at age 26. Shortly after Arnulf's death his widow married King Robert II of France.

== Family ==
In 976, he married Rozala of Italy, daughter of Berengar II of Italy, and had two children:

- Baldwin IV (980–1035), who succeeded his father. He married twice and fathered Baldwin V.
- Mathilde, who died before 995.

== See also ==
- Counts of Flanders family tree

Arnulf II of Flanders House of Flanders Born: 960 or 961 Died: 30 March 987
| Preceded by Arnulf I | Count of Flanders; 965–987 with Baldwin Balso | Succeeded by Baldwin IV |
