= Baldwin III of Flanders =

Count of Flanders from 958 to 962

Baldwin III
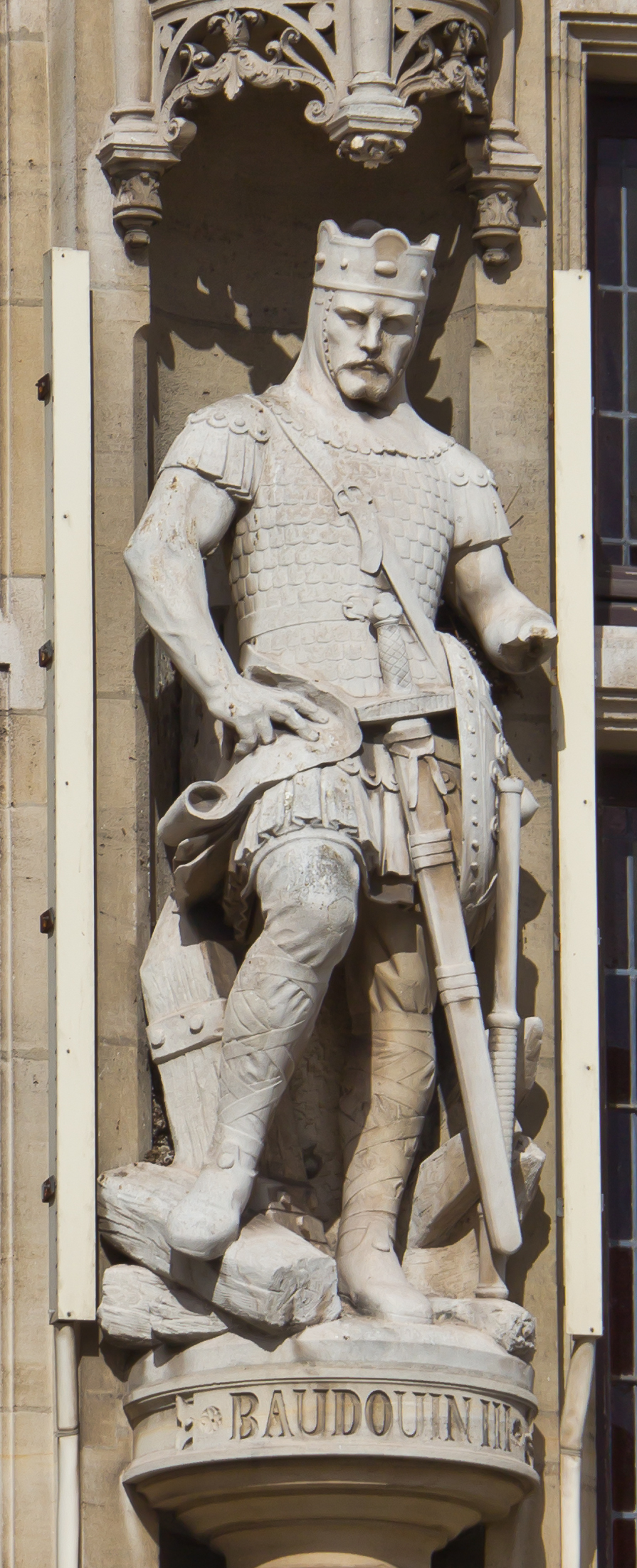
- Statue of Baldwin III on the facade of the Hôtel de Ville at Dunkirk

Count of Flanders
- Co-reign: 958 – 1 January 962
- Predecessor: Arnulf I
- Successor: Arnulf II
- Born: c. 940
- Died: 1 January 962 (aged 21-22)
- Noble family: House of Flanders
- Spouse: Matilda of Saxony
- Issue: Arnulf II, Count of Flanders
- Father: Arnulf I
- Mother: Adele of Vermandois

Baldwin III (c. 940–1 January 962), called the Young, was Count of Flanders, who briefly ruled the County of Flanders together with his father, Arnulf I, from 958 until his early death.

Baldwin III was born c. 940. He was the son of Count Arnulf I of Flanders and his second wife, Adele of Vermandois (c. 915 – 969). Shortly before 961, Baldwin married Mathilde of Saxony (died 1008), daughter of Duke Hermann Billung of Saxony. They had a son, Arnulf (c. 960 – 987).

Arnulf I made Baldwin III co-ruler of Flanders in 958. During his short rule, Baldwin was responsible for establishing the wool manufacturing industry at Ghent and markets at other towns in Flanders. Baldwin III died of smallpox on 1 January 962, after a campaign against the Normans. After Baldwin's death, Arnulf I arranged for King Lothair of France to become the guardian of Baldwin's son, Arnulf II, who succeeded Arnulf I.

== See also ==
- Counts of Flanders family tree

Preceded by Arnulf I	Count of Flanders; 958–962 with Arnulf I	Succeeded by Arnulf II
