= County of Holland =

Former State of the Holy Roman Empire and part of the Habsburg Netherlands (1091–1795)

Coordinates: 52°09′48″N 4°32′12″E

County of Holland Comitatus Hollandiae (Latin) Graafschap Holland (Dutch)
- 1091–1795
- Coat of arms
- Motto: "Vigilate Deo confidentes" (Latin) "Watch, trusting in God"
- The County of Holland around 1350
- Status: State of the Holy Roman Empire (1091–1581); Part of the Burgundian Netherlands (1433–1482); Part of the Habsburg Netherlands (1482–1581); Part of the Dutch Republic (1581–1795)
- Capital: The Hague
- Common languages: Old Frisian; Old Dutch; Middle Dutch; Dutch
- Religion: Catholic Church; Dutch Reformed
- Government: Feudal monarchy
- Count
  - 880–896: Gerolf (first)
  - 1555–1581: Phillip II (last)
- Stadtholder
  - 1433–1440: Hugo (first)
  - 1672–1702: William III (last)
- Legislature: States
- Historical era: Middle Ages, Renaissance, Modern
  - Established: 11th century
  - Act of Abjuration: 26 July 1581
  - Batavian Revolution: 18 January 1795
Preceded by	Succeeded by
Lower Lorraine	Batavian Republic
- Today part of: Netherlands

The County of Holland was a state of the Holy Roman Empire from its inception until 1433. From 1433 onward it was part of the Burgundian Netherlands, from 1482 part of the Habsburg Netherlands and from 1581 onward the leading province of the Dutch Republic until the Batavian Revolution in 1795. The territory of the County of Holland corresponds roughly with the current provinces of North Holland and South Holland in the Netherlands.

The County of Holland was the first Holy Roman county in the area to reach a substantial level of economic, cultural, military, and technological development, having had time to undergo this development before the area became classed as a county.

== Etymology ==
The oldest sources refer to the not clearly defined county as Frisia, west of the Vlie (also known as West Frisia). Before 1101, sources talk about Frisian counts, but in this year Floris II, Count of Holland, is mentioned as Florentius comes de Hollant ('Floris, Count of Holland'). Another early usage of the word is a deed dated 1083 in which Dirk V used the term "Count of Holland" for himself.

Holland is probably from the Old Dutch: holt lant, lit. 'wood land'. The counts of Holland generally kept to this single title until 1291, when Floris V, Count of Holland decided to call himself "Count of Holland and Zeeland, Lord of Friesland". This title was also used after Holland was united with Hainault, Bavaria-Straubing, and the Duchy of Burgundy. The titles eventually lost their importance, and the last count, Philip II of Spain, only mentioned them halfway through his long list of titles.

== History ==
=== Francia and Lotharingia ===
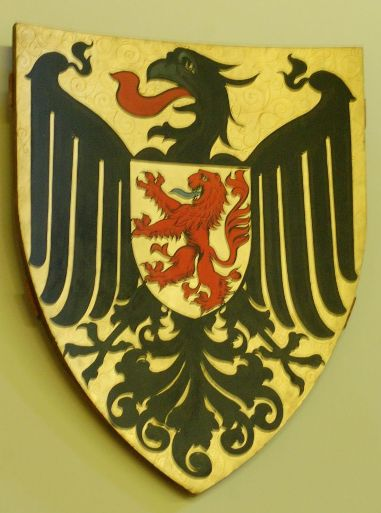
German Eagle with an Inescutcheon of the County of Holland (The Knights' Hall, The Hague)

Around 800, under Charlemagne, the Frankish Empire covered much of Europe. In much of this empire, an important unit of regional administration (corresponding roughly to a shire or county in England) was the gau (Frankish) or pagus (Latin). A comes (count) ruled one or more gaue. Because of the low volume of trade, the negative trade balance with the Byzantine Empire and the Muslim states and the disappearance of currency, the economy was more or less reduced to barter. The king's vassals could be rewarded only with land (beneficium or, from the tenth century, feodum) and usufruct, and feudalism developed from that. The vassals, who were generally appointed by the king, strove for a system of inheritance. This informal rule became more widespread and in 877 was legalised in the Capitulary of Quierzy.

Upon the death of a king, the Frankish kingdom was frequently divided among his heirs. The system of partible inheritance often caused internal strife, which made centralized government problematic. The Viking raids further undermined centralized government. At the end of the reign of Emperor Louis the Pious, royal power had weakened by the flood of 838 and by infighting between the king's sons. After Louis died in 840, his son, Emperor Lothair I, who was king of Middle Francia, rewarded the Danish Viking brothers Rorik and Harald with Frisia in an attempt to resist Viking attacks.

When Lothair died in 855, the northern part of Middle Francia was awarded to his second son, Lothair II, and was called Lotharingia.

Rorik was granted the right to rule Kennemerland in 862.

The 880 Treaty of Ribemont added the Kingdom of Lotharingia (which included the Low Countries) to East Francia, which attempted to integrate it. However, there were no strong political connections like those between the four German stem duchies of east Francia: Franconia, the Saxony, the Bavaria and the Swabia. Lotharingia had considerable self-determination; this became clear when Louis the Child, East Francia's last Carolingian, died in 911. Although the stem duchies flocked to Duke Conrad I of Franconia, Lotharingia chose the Carolingian king of West Francia, Charles the Simple.

In Frisia, the situation was complex. Power was in the hands of Rorik's successor, Godfrid, who became embroiled in the politics of the Frankish empire and was allied with the children of Lothair II. Danish rule ended in 885 with the murder of Godfrid at Herispijk, and all Danes east of the coastal areas of West Frisia were killed or driven out in what must have been a complex, successful conspiracy. Henry of Franconia led a coalition of Babenberg Franks, Hamaland Saxons and Teisterbant Frisians (in cooperation with the bishop of Cologne and the Emperor), which outsmarted Godfrid and the Danes. The chief conspirator in the murder was Everard Saxo, count of Hamaland. One of those who profited most from the power vacuum was the Frisian Gerolf, comes Fresonum (count of Frisia), from Westergo in the present-day province of Friesland. Gerolf, Godfrid's former envoy to the emperor, demanded lands in the Moselle valley from the emperor to provoke a war.

After the elimination of a large portion of the Danish population, Gerulf controlled a large Frisian part of the later county of Holland. This fait accompli was recognised when Gerolf was given lands in full ownership on 4 August 889 by the East Frankish king Arnulf of Carinthia, who needed strong warlords in the delta region to keep the Danes and other Vikings out. The lands in question included an area outside Gerulf's county, in Teisterbant, which included Tiel, Aalburg and Asch. It also involved a forest and field between the mouth of the Old Rhine (and presumably Bennebroek), Suithardeshaga, the border between the former Frankish counties of Rijnland and Kennemerland. A line of Gerulf's descendants became the Counts of Holland.

King Charles the Simple gave the church in Egmond and its possessions to Count Dirk I of Holland in 922 in gratitude for Dirk's support in the Battle of Soissons to suppress a rebellion of his West Frankish vassals. The West Frankish king was able to do this because the lands and churches he granted to Dirk were outside his jurisdiction; Egmond was just north of possessions which Dirk had received from Gerulf and was a good match. He then founded Egmond Abbey, Holland's oldest monastery. When Charles the Simple was deposed in 923, King Henry the Fowler of East Francia allied with Count Gilbert of Hainaut (son of Duke Reginar of Lorraine) and re-conquered Lotharingia. By 925, the Lotharingian nobles accepted his rule and Lotharingia (with the Frisian lands) became a fifth German stem duchy. Henry's power was limited by his vassal, Gilbert (Duke of Lotharingia), whose power was limited to his own counties.

=== Imperial State ===
History of the Low Countries (Borders are imprecise)
Frisii		Belgae					
Frisii	Cana– nefates (Note: Roman foederati)	Chamavi, Tubantes (Note: The Chamavi merged into the confederation of the Franks; the Tubantes merged into the confederation of the Saxons.)		Gallia Belgica (55 BC–c. 5th century AD); Germania Inferior (83–c. 5th century)			
Frisii	Cana– nefates	Salian Franks		Batavi			
unpopulated (4th –c. 5th centuries)		Saxons	Salian Franks (4th–c. 5th centuries)				
Frisian Kingdom (c. 6th century – 734)		Saxons	Frankish Kingdom (481–843)—Carolingian Empire (800–843)				
Frisian Kingdom (c. 6th century – 734)		Austrasia (511–687)					
Middle Francia (843–855)				West; Francia (from 843)	Middle Francia (843–855)		
Kingdom of Lotharingia (Note: Part of East Francia after 939, divided in Upper Lorraine (as part of West Francia) and Lower Lorraine (as part of East Francia) in 959.) (855–959); Duchy of Lower Lorraine (Note: Lower Lorraine—also referred to as Lothier—disintegrated into several smaller independent territories and only the title of a "Duke of Lothier" remained, held by Brabant.) (from 959)			Kingdom of Lotharingia (855–959); Duchy of Lower Lorraine (from 959)	West; Francia (from 843)	Kingdom of Lotharingia (855–959); Duchy of Lower Lorraine (from 959)		
Frisia			Kingdom of Lotharingia (855–959); Duchy of Lower Lorraine (from 959)	County of Flanders (Note: Including County of Artois (part of Flanders until 1237) and Tournaisis.) (862–1384)	Kingdom of Lotharingia (855–959); Duchy of Lower Lorraine (from 959)		
Frisian; Freedom (Note: Lordship of Frisia and Lordship of Groningen (including the Ommelanden) after 1524 and 1536 respectively.) (11th–16th centuries)	County of Holland (Note: Including County of Zeeland, that was ruled by neighboring County of Holland and County of Flanders (until 1432).) (880–1432)	Bishopric of Utrecht (Note: Utrecht included Lordship of Overijssel (until 1528), County of Drenthe (until 1528) and County of Zutphen (until 1182).) (695–1456)	Duchy of Brabant (Note: Duchy of Brabant included since 1288 also the Duchy of Limburg (now part of Belgium's Liège Province) and the "Overmaas" lands Dalhem, Valkenburg and Herzogenrath (now part of the Dutch Province of Limburg).) (1183–1430) Duchy of Guelders (Note: The county, later duchy, of Guelders consisted of four quarters, as they were separated by rivers: situated upstream Upper Quarter (the present day northern half of the Dutch province of Limburg), spatially separated from the three downstream Lower Quarters: County of Zutphen (after 1182), Veluwe Quarter and Nijmegen Quarter. The three lower quarters emerged from the historic gau Hamaland (named after the Chamavi tribe), and formed the present day province of Gelderland. Guelders did not include the Cleves enclave Huissen and the independent counties of Buren and Culemborg, that were much later seceded to the province of Gelderland.) (1046–1543)	County of Flanders (862–1384)	County of Hainaut (1071–1432) County of Namur (981–1421)	Prince- Bishopric of Liège (Note: Throughout the Middle Ages, the bishopric was further expanded with the Duchy of Bouillon in 1096 (ceded to France in 1678), the acquisition of the county of Loon in 1366 and the county of Horne in 1568. The Lordship of Mechelen was also part of the Prince-Bishopric of Liège.)(980–1791)	Duchy of Luxembourg (1059–1443)
Frisian; Freedom (11th–16th centuries)	Burgundian Netherlands (1384–1482)					Prince- Bishopric of Liège (980–1791)	Burgundian Netherlands (1384–1482)
Habsburg Netherlands (1482–1795) (Seventeen Provinces after 1543) (Note: The name Seventeen Provinces came in use after the Habsburg emperor Charles V had re-acquired the Duchy of Guelders, and an continuous territory arose.)						Prince- Bishopric of Liège (980–1791)	Habsburg Netherlands (1482–1795) (Seventeen Provinces after 1543)
Dutch Republic (1581–1795)				Spanish Netherlands (1556–1714)		Prince- Bishopric of Liège (980–1791)	Spanish Netherlands (1556–1714)
Dutch Republic (1581–1795)				Austrian Netherlands (1714–1795)		Prince- Bishopric of Liège (980–1791)	Austrian Netherlands (1714–1795)
Dutch Republic (1581–1795)				United States of Belgium (1790)		Republic of Liège (1789–'91)	United States of Belgium (1790)
Dutch Republic (1581–1795)				Austrian Netherlands (1795–1797)		P.-Bish. of Liège (1791–1794)	Austrian Netherlands (1795–1797)
Batavian Republic (1795–1806); Kingdom of Holland (1806–1810)			associated with French First Republic (1795–1804) part of First French Empire (1804–1815)				
part of First French Empire (1810–1813)			associated with French First Republic (1795–1804) part of First French Empire (1804–1815)				
Sovereign Principality of the Netherlands (1813–1815)			associated with French First Republic (1795–1804) part of First French Empire (1804–1815)				
United Kingdom of the Netherlands (1815–1830)							Grand Duchy of Luxembourg (from 1815)
Kingdom of the Netherlands (from 1839)				Kingdom of Belgium (from 1830)			Grand Duchy of Luxembourg (from 1815)
Kingdom of the Netherlands (from 1839)				Kingdom of Belgium (from 1830)			Grand Duchy of Luxembourg (from 1890)

The rising status of the House of Holland was shown when in 938 Count Dirk II, probably the grandson of Count Dirk I, married at the age of 8 with Hildegard of Flanders, daughter of Count Arnulf I of Flanders.

The County of Holland and other nearby territories had a considerable amount of independence from Holy Roman Empire leadership in the 10th and 11th centuries. Until at least the second half of the 10th century, Holland's leadership valued secular principles, a contrast to the nearby Prince-Bishopric of Utrecht.

The count of Holland was in this period more of a military commander who had to resist Viking raids, and be subject to the authority of the Bishopric of Utrecht. In 985, King Otto III, at the request of his mother Theophanu, granted the ownership (proprium) of a number of lands to count Dirk II. These lands had already been given in loan (beneficium). This was the area between the rivers Loira or Lier and Hisla (a gouw called Masaland), villa Sunnimeri (on the Zeelandish island of Schouwen), the area between the rivers Medemelaka and Chinnelosara gemerchi (Kinheim) and the gouw Texla.

In 993, count Arnulf of Ghent was killed in a battle against Frisian land reclaimers who did not want to pay their due to the count. It is unknown where this battle took place but it was probably in the Rijnland or in the Maas estuary. Arnulf's son, count Dirk III of Holland was too young to rule, so his mother Lutgardis of Luxemburg acted as regent. In 1005 Dirk was old enough to rule in his own name, but he still made thankful use of the good connections that his mother had made. According to Thietmar of Merseburg, a reconciliation with the Frisians was arranged with help from his uncle-in-law, king Henry II, who travelled with an army and a fleet from Utrecht to the Maas-estuary (probably Vlaardingen) to force the inhabitants to recognize their count. This expedition appears to have been successful since after 1005 no revolts against the count in this southern part of the later county of Holland are known.

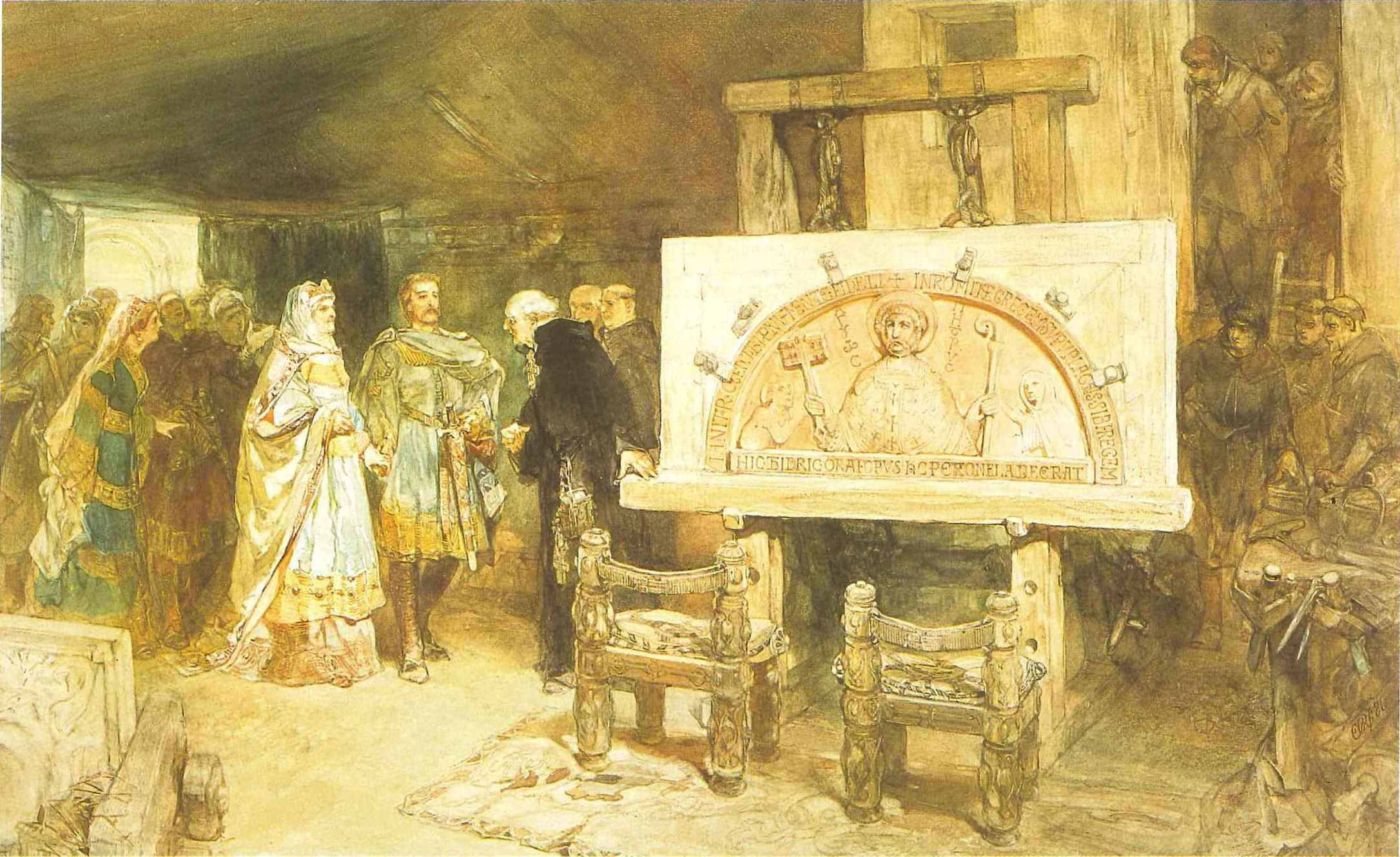
Dirk VI, Count of Holland, 1114–1157, and his mother Petronella visiting the work on the Egmond Abbey, Charles Rochussen, 1881.

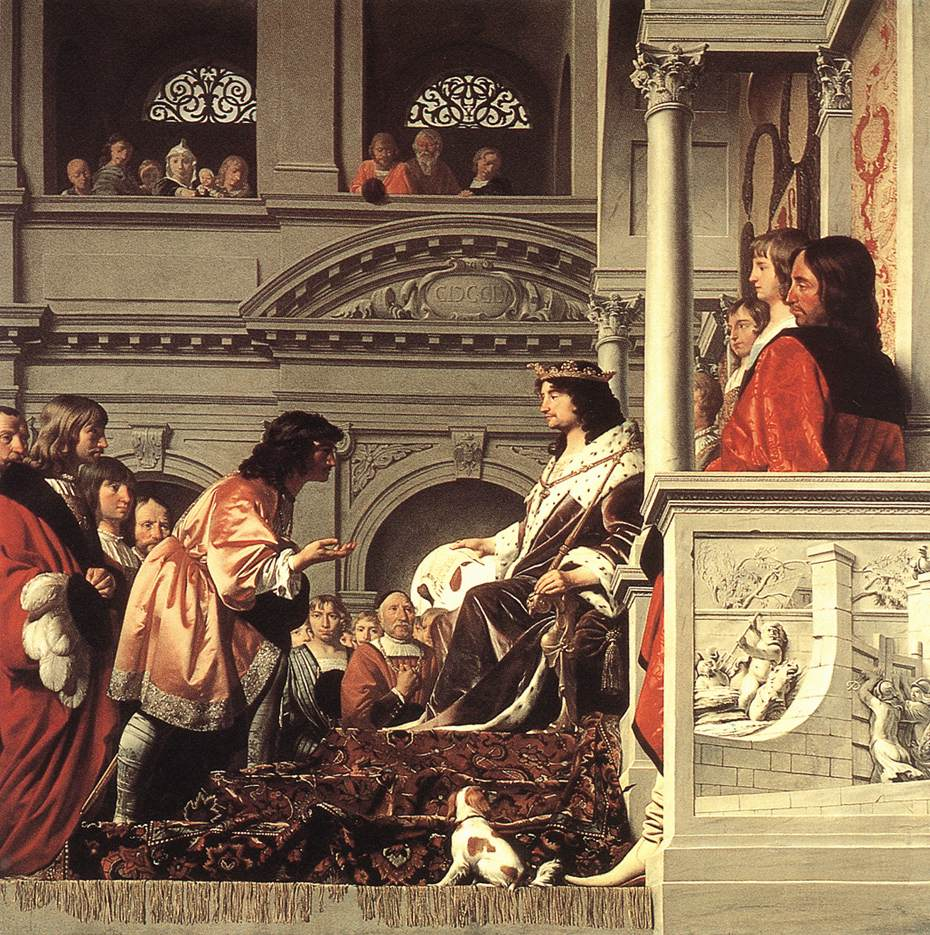
Count Willem II of Holland Granting Privileges by Caesar van Everdingen and Pieter Post, 1654.

As a result of a promise he had made during the Frisian rebellion, Dirk III went on a pilgrimage to Jerusalem. When he returned, the northern side of his county had become unsafe, so he travelled south and started granting rights to reclaim lands from nature around present-day Vlaardingen in order to cultivate these lands. He also built a castle at Silva Meriwido, the future Vlaardingen. From this castle, he forced merchants that travelled per ship from Tiel to England to pay toll. The Bishop of Utrecht, Adalbold and the merchants of Tiel complained against this piracy at the Reichstag of Nijmegen in 1018, the merchants of Tiel effectively pointing out that the emperor was losing tax revenue when he allowed the Tiel merchants to being plundered by Dirk III. It was decided to act against Dirk III. An army led by Godfrey II Duke of Lower Lorraine, consisting of a fleet with soldiers from the bishops of Utrecht, Cologne, Cambrai and Liège was however surprisingly ambushed in a swamp and nearly annihilated by Dirk III Frisian subjects in what was called the Battle of Vlaardingen, Dirk III himself playing a coordinating role, only to appear from his castle to officially take prisoner the duke of Lower Lorraine, when Godfrey was on the verge of being killed.

So as not to weaken the protection the county of Holland offered against the Viking raids, King Henry II decided to let the matter rest, though he did strengthen the position of the Bishop of Utrecht, the nominal feudal lord of the counts of Holland. Nonetheless, Dirk managed to expand his territory to the east at the cost of the Bishopric of Utrecht. After the death of Henry II in 1024, Dirk III supported the candidature of Conrad II in an attempt to reconcile with the imperial authorities, so as to keep the lands he had acquired or expand them even further.

Emperor Conrad II died during a stay in Utrecht in 1039 during the rule of bishop Bernold, after which his organs were interred in the Cathedral of Utrecht. His son and successor, Henry III, granted numerous favours to the bishopric of Utrecht. In this way, the Oversticht was assigned to the bishopric in 1040. Though the count of Holland had been reconciled with the emperor, Henry III still decided to punish the count. In 1046 the emperor forced Dirk IV to relinquish the lands he had conquered. However, the emperor was not able to maintain himself in the area and was forced to retreat, after which Dirk IV started to raid and plunder the bishoprics of Utrecht and Liège. Moreover, Dirk signed treaties with Godfrey the Bearded, duke of Lower Lorraine, as well as the counts of Flanders and Hainaut. The Emperor responded with a second punitive expedition in which Vlaardingen and the castle at Rijnsburg were taken from Dirk IV. The castle was completely destroyed. However, the emperor suffered heavy losses during his retreat, upon which Dirk's allies openly revolted against the emperor. In 1049 Dirk IV was lured into a trap and killed by assassins hired by the bishops of Metz, Liège and Utrecht. Dirk died young, unmarried and childless. He was succeeded by his brother Floris I.

Floris I managed to expand his territory with a small area within the Rijnland Gouw, an area called Holtland ("Woodland"), or Holland. It is most likely that this name soon became synonymous with Floris' whole territory. In 1061 a war broke out, in which it is not clear whether it was against Brabant, Utrecht or Liège. During this war, Floris was ambushed while relaxing too much and in too small a company when he was raiding in the former Teisterbant county, now Utrechtian territory. He was killed by either Utrechtian or Gueldrian troops. His son Dirk V was still a minor, so his mother Gertrude of Saxony became regent. Gertrude remarried in 1063 with Robert the Frisian, a younger brother of the count of Flanders, Baldwin VI and a grandson of a former French king, Robert II, who also acted as regent for Dirk V.

In 1064, Emperor Henry IV donated lands belonging to the county of Holland, 'west of the Vlie and around the banks of the Rhine' (the gouw of Westflinge), to William, Bishop of Utrecht, on whose support the Emperor could count. Dirk V was only allowed to keep the gouw of Masaland. Through battles in 1071 and 1072, William of Utrecht, with support from the highly competent Duke Godfrey IV of Lower Lorraine, managed to gain actual central control over nearly the entire later county of Holland for the first time. Robert the Frisian and Dirk V had to flee to Ghent. This could have been the end of the Gerulfingian dynasty. Robert the Frisian managed however against some odds to become count of Flanders in 1076 when in the battle of Cassel he managed to beat a grand coalition of Hainaut, French and Normandian forces. Being now the count of Flanders he was able to assist his stepson to reclaim the county of Holland. The pair started by taking out their most dangerous adversary. Godfrey IV was killed at night while defecating. Shortly afterwards the formidable bishop William of Utrecht also died. After this Robert I and his stepson Dirk V besieged the new Utrecht/Lotharingian castle at a strategic place at the delta in IJsselmonde, where the Hollandse IJssel (still existing) joined the Merwede (not existing any more in the form of 1000 years ago). In the battle of IJsselmonde they managed to capture the new bishop Conrad of Swabia, who was now forced to return the lands to Dirk V's control. In 1101, the name "Holland" first appears in a deed.

Holland's influence continued to gradually grow over the next two centuries. The counts of Holland were able to conquer most of Zeeland, to diminish the power of bishops of Utrecht and from the start of the 12th until the 13th century fight a 150-year-long war against the inhabitants of the area living at the east side of North Holland, also confusingly known as "West-Frisians". It was not until 1289 that Count Floris V was able to bring this long war to an end and subjugate these West Frisians, this only after the St. Lucia's flood in 1287 had completely devastated nearly all the lands of the West-Frisians. After this, the county was officially known until 1795 as the county of Holland and West Friesland.

=== Burgundians and Habsburgs ===
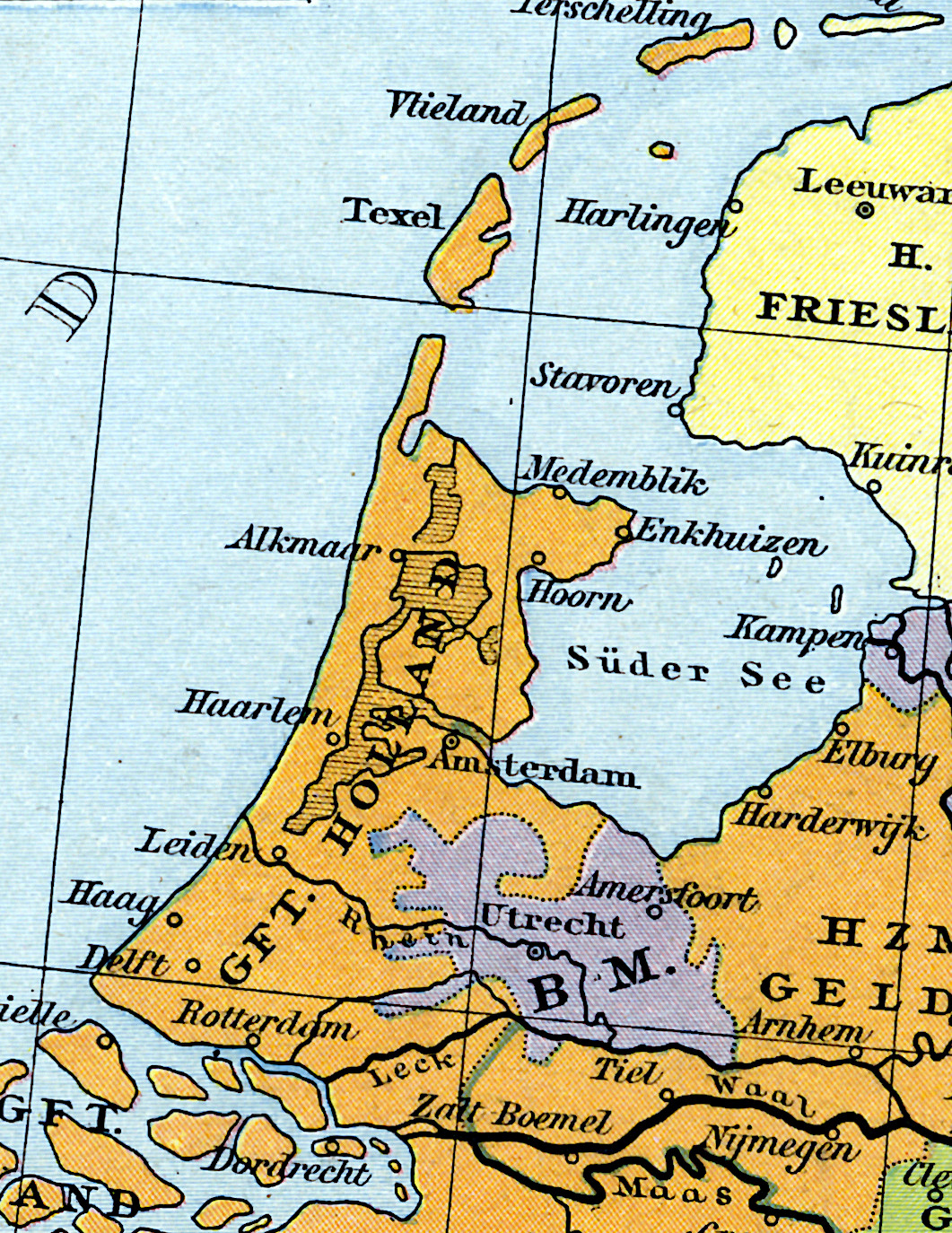
The County of Holland in the 15th century

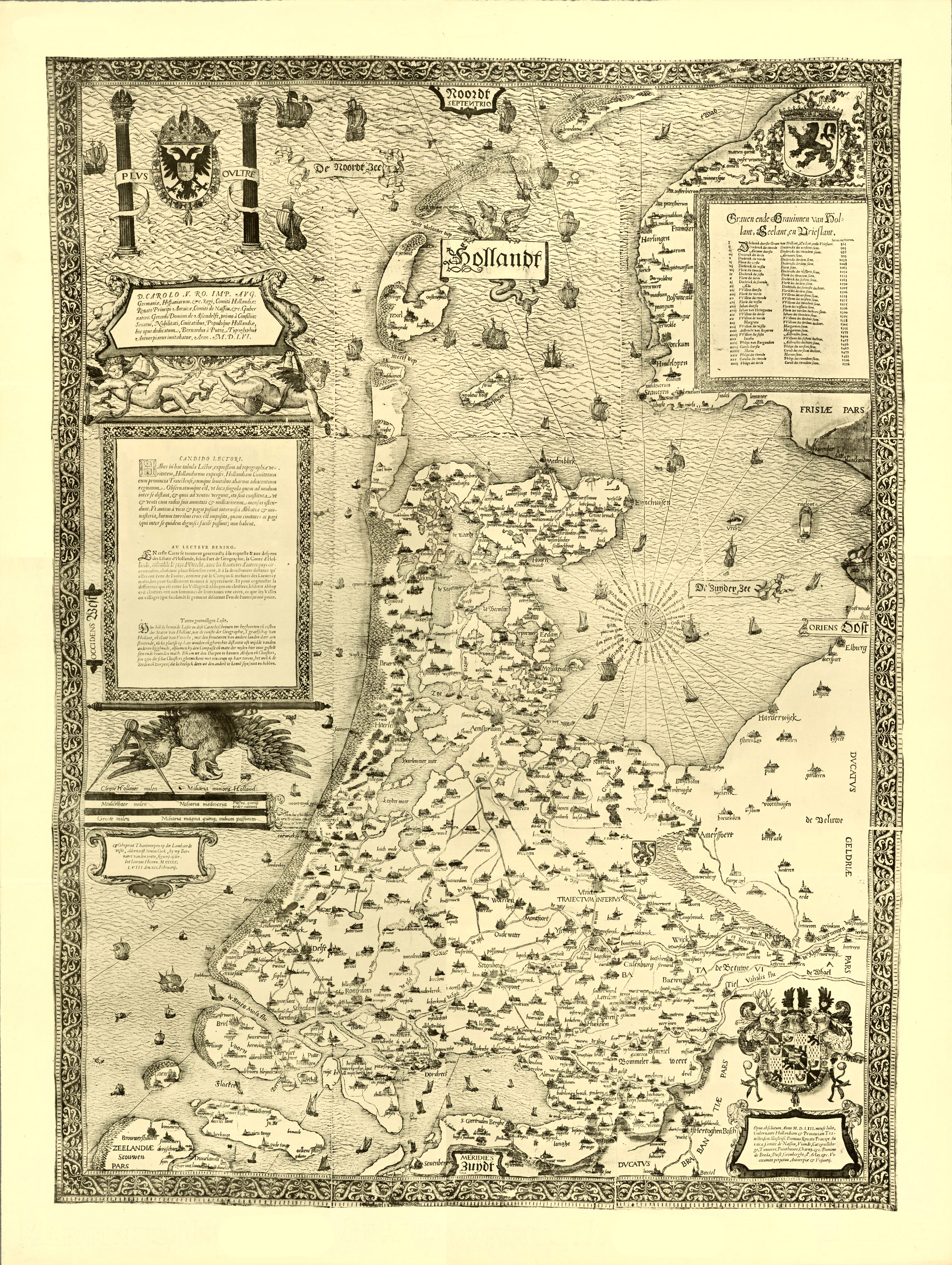
A 1558 map of Holland.

The Hook and Cod Wars were a series of wars and battles in Holland between 1350 and 1490. Most of these wars were fought over the title of count, but some have argued that the underlying reason was because of the power struggle of the bourgeois in the cities against the ruling nobility. The Cod faction generally consisted of the more progressive cities of Holland. The Hook faction consisted of a large part of the conservative noblemen. Some of the main figures in this multi-generational conflict were William IV, Margaret, William V, William VI, Count of Holland and Hainaut, John and Philip the Good. Perhaps the most well known, however, is Jacqueline, Countess of Hainaut. By the end of the Hook and Cod Wars, Philip the Good, Duke of Burgundy, had taken control of Holland. Leading noblemen in Holland had invited the duke to conquer Holland, even though he had no historical claim to it. Some historians say that the ruling class in Holland wanted Holland to integrate with the Flemish economic system and adopt Flemish legal institutions.

Under the Burgundians, Holland's trade developed rapidly, especially in the areas of shipping and transport. The new rulers defended Dutch trading interests. The fleets of Holland defeated the fleets of the Hanseatic League several times. Amsterdam grew and in the 15th century became the primary trading port in Europe for grain from the Baltic region. Amsterdam distributed grain to the major cities of Belgium, Northern France and England. This trade was vital to the people of Holland, because Holland could no longer produce enough grain to feed itself. Land drainage had caused the peat of the former wetlands to reduce to a level that was too low for drainage to be maintained.

Charles (1500–58) became the owner in 1506, but in 1515 he left to become king of Spain and later became the Holy Roman Emperor. Charles turned over control to regents (his close relatives), and in practice rule was exercised by mostly French speaking Burgundians he controlled. Holland retained its own governments and court, controlled by the local nobility, and its own traditions and rights ("liberties") dating back centuries. Likewise the numerous cities had their own legal rights and local governments, usually controlled by the merchants, On top of this, however, the Burgundians had imposed an overall government, the Estates General of the Netherlands, with its own officials and courts.

=== Revolt and the Dutch Republic ===
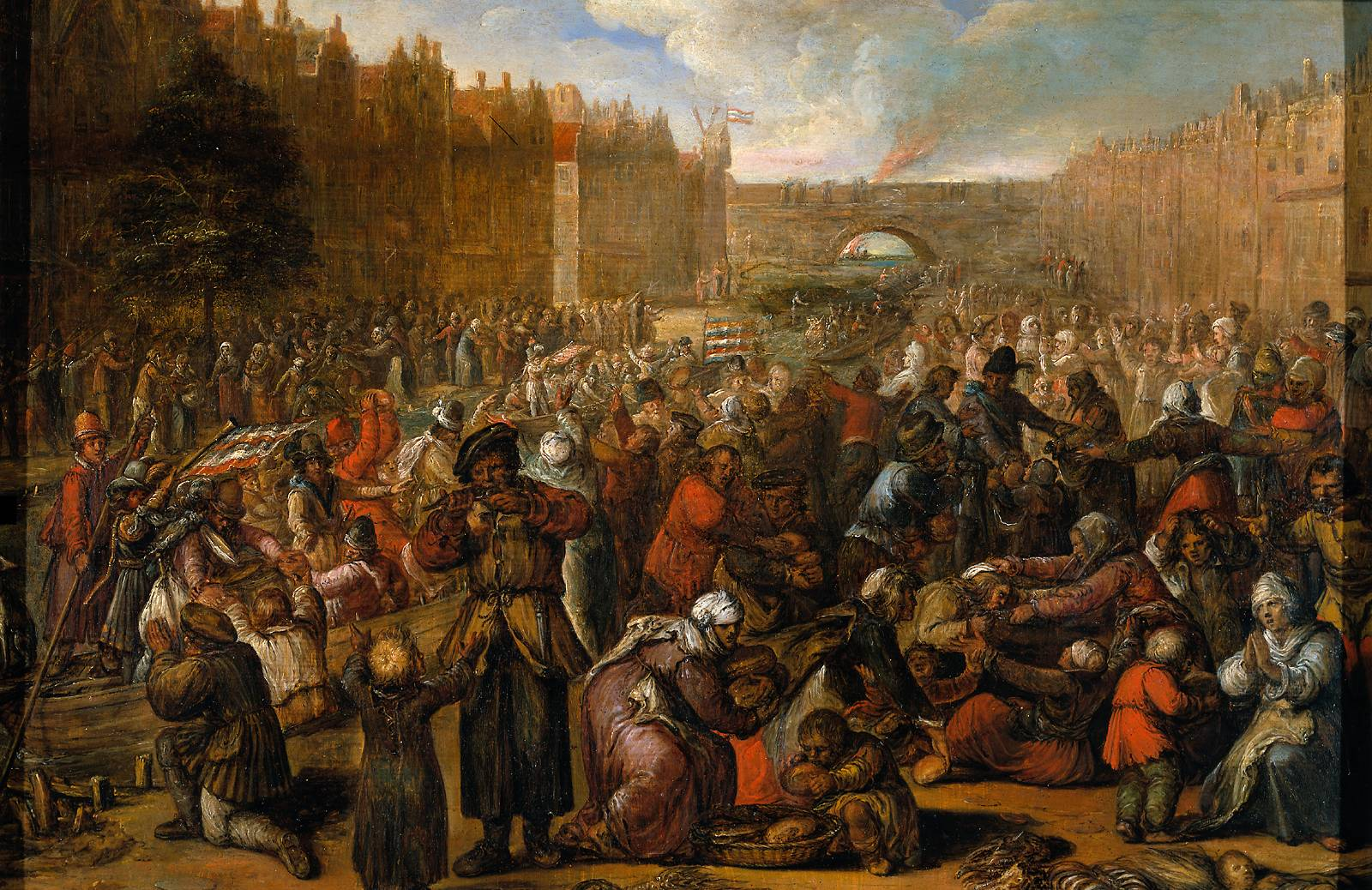
The Relief of Leiden by the Geuzen in 1574, by Otto van Veen.

During the 16th century, the Protestant Reformation rapidly gained ground in northern Europe, especially in its Lutheran and Calvinist forms. Protestants in Holland, after initial repression, were tolerated by local authorities. By the 1560s, the Protestant community had become a significant influence in the county, although it clearly formed a minority then. In a society dependent on trade, freedom and tolerance were considered essential. Nevertheless, the Catholic rulers Charles V and his successor Philip II felt it was their duty to defeat Protestantism, which was considered a heresy by the Catholic Church and a threat to the stability of the whole hierarchical political system. The Catholic Spanish responded with harsh persecution and introduced the Spanish Inquisition. Calvinists rebelled. First, there was the iconoclasm in 1566, which was the systematic destruction of statues of saints and other Catholic devotional depictions in churches. After 1566 William the Silent, more or less by accident became the leader of a revolt that by severe mismanagement by Philip II and his governor the Duke of Alva turned into the Eighty Years' War. As a consequence, Holland and the other six allied provinces became an independent nation called the Republic of the Seven United Provinces. Over William of Orange Blum says, "His patience, tolerance, determination, concern for his people, and belief in government by consent held the Dutch together and kept alive their spirit of revolt." The main breakthrough came when Holland, along with Zeeland, was conquered in 1572 and following years by the Watergeuzen, a somehow effective maritime force of mainly Calvinists who turned pirate and pirates who turned Calvinist.

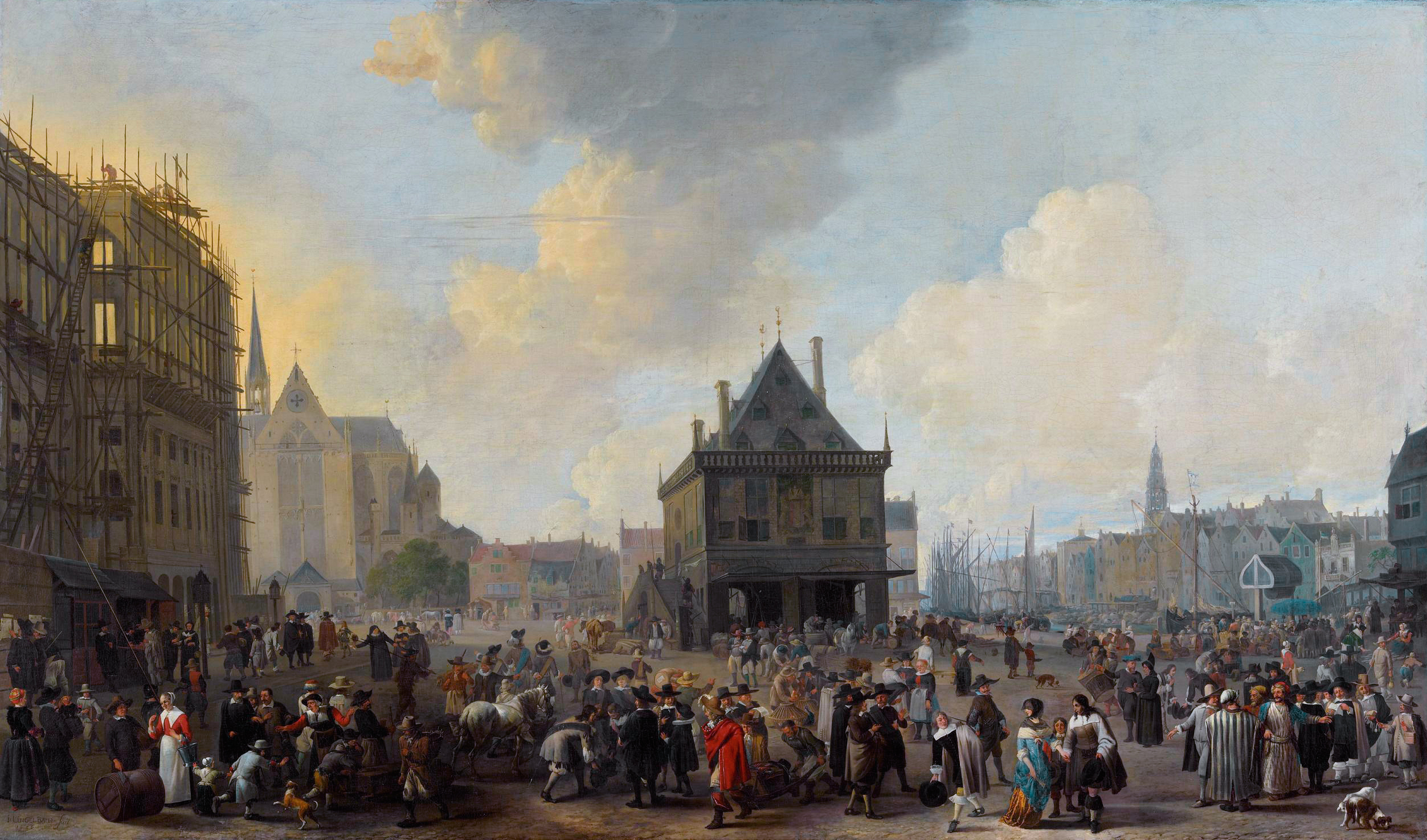
Dam Square with the New Town Hall under Construction, by Johannes Lingelbach, 1656.

The States General of the Netherlands signed the Act of Abjuration, deposing Philip as Count of Holland and forming a confederation between the seven liberated provinces. From then on, the executive and legislative power would again rest with the States of Holland and West Friesland, which were led by a political figure who held the office of Grand Pensionary. The county, now a sovereign state within this larger confederation, became the cultural, political and economic centre of the Dutch Republic, in the 17th century, the Dutch Golden Age, the wealthiest nation in the world. The largest cities in the republic were situated in the province of Holland, such as Amsterdam, Rotterdam, Leiden, Alkmaar, Delft, Dordrecht, Haarlem, and the nation's capital, The Hague. From the great ports of Holland, Hollandic merchants sailed to and from destinations all over Europe, and merchants from all over Europe gathered to trade in the warehouses of Amsterdam and other trading cities of Holland. Many Europeans thought of the United Provinces first as "Holland" rather than as the "Republic of the Seven United Provinces of the Netherlands". A strong impression of "Holland" was planted in the minds of other Europeans, which then was projected back onto the Republic as a whole. Within the provinces themselves, a gradual slow process of cultural expansion took place, leading to a "Hollandification" of the other provinces and a more uniform culture for the whole of the Republic. In the early decades of the uprising, a great number of refugees from Flanders and Brabant settled in the big cities of Holland. They had a Frankish influence on the new dialect of urban Holland (that earlier had more Frisian influences) that in later centuries became the standard language of the Netherlands and Dutch-speaking Belgium.

Nominally, the County of Holland formally came to an end in 1795, when the Batavian Revolution ended the republic and reformed it as the Batavian Republic. The territory of the former county was divided between the departments of the Amstel, Delf, Texel, and Schelde en Maas. After 1813, Holland was restored as a province of the United Kingdom of the Netherlands. Holland was divided into the present provinces North Holland and South Holland in 1840.

== Geography ==
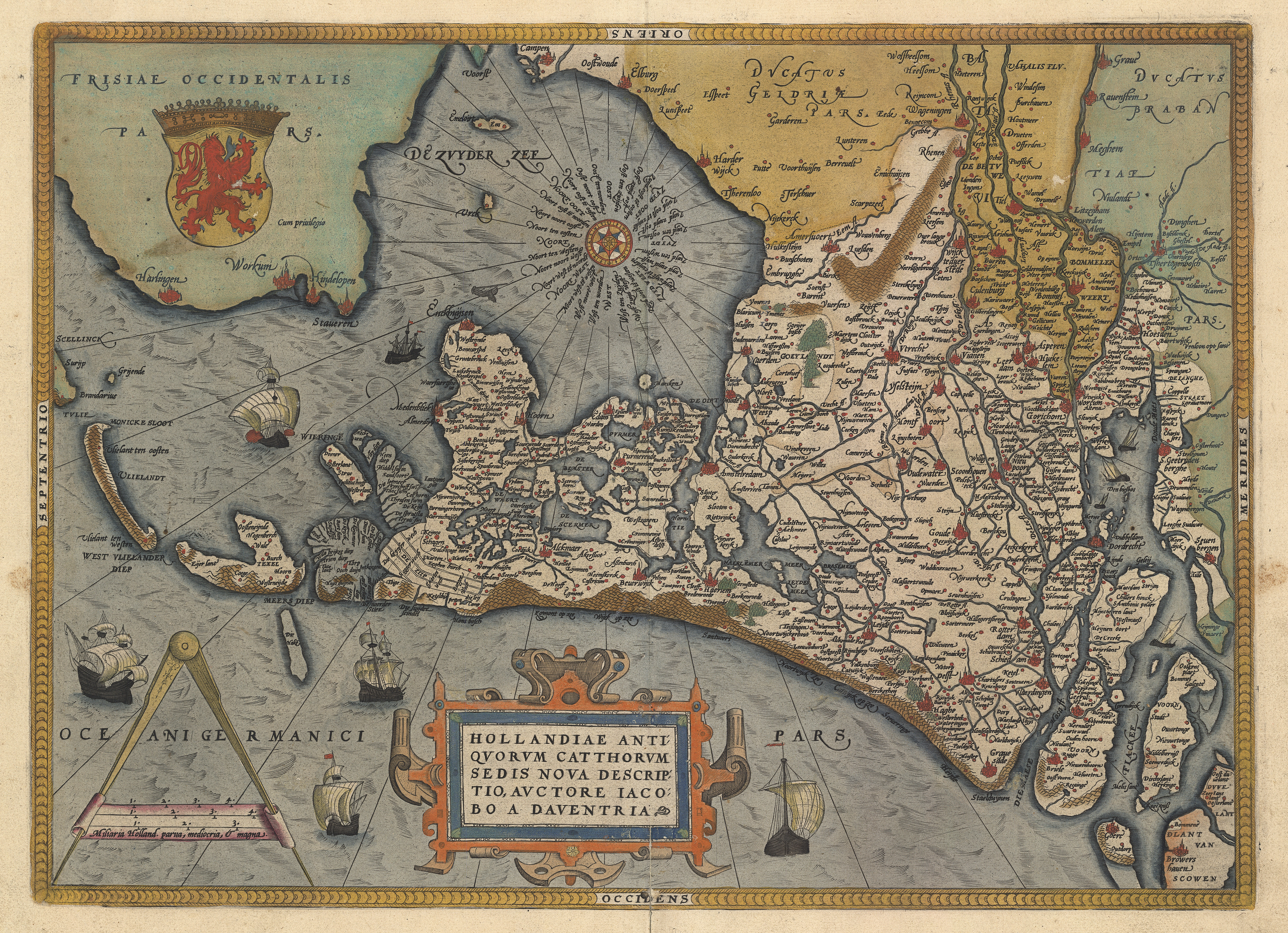
County of Holland in 1570, Jacob van Deventer

The county covered an area roughly corresponding to the current Dutch provinces of North Holland and South Holland, as well as the northwestern part of the current province of North Brabant (roughly between the towns of Willemstad, Geertruidenberg and Werkendam), and the islands of Terschelling, Vlieland, Urk and Schokland, though it did not include the island of Goeree-Overflakkee.

In the early Middle Ages, large parts of the area covered by the present-day Netherlands were covered by peat bogs. These bogs limited the size of arable land in the Netherlands, but also proved to be a good source of fuel. Around 950, small-scale reclamation was started on the enormous bogs in Holland and Utrecht, probably set in motion by the minor nobility. In the 11th century the 'Great Reclamation' started, under the control of the counts of Holland and the bishops of Utrecht. Until the 13th century, large amounts of land were reclaimed between the IJ bay in the north, the dunes in the west, the Lek and Waal rivers in the south and the Old Rhine in the east.

Before the Great Reclamation, the borders between the county of Holland and the bishopric of Utrecht were unclear, and there existed a literal no-man's land. However, during the reclamation the counts of Holland managed to expand their influence at the cost of Utrecht.

== See also ==
- Count of Holland
- Counties of the Holy Roman Empire
- Frisian freedom

== Bibliography ==
- Block, Dick (1977–1983). Algemene Geschiedenis der Nederlanden. Haarlem: Fibula-Van Dishoeck. ISBN 90-228-3800-5.
- Lamberts, J.C.H. (2006). Geschiedenis van de Nederlanden. Baarn: HBuitgevers. ISBN 90-5574-474-3.
- Graaf, A.C.F. (1970). Oorlog om Holland 1000-1375. Hilversum: Verloren. ISBN 90-6550-807-4.
- Koch, A.C.F. (1970). Oorkondenboek van Holland en Zeeland tot 1299, Deel I – einde 7e eeuw tot 1222. Den Haag: Nijhoff. ISBN 90-247-0403-0.
- Beukers, T. de (2002). Geschiedenis van Holland tot 1572. Hilversum. ISBN 90-6550-682-9.
