= Battle of Vlaardingen =

1018 victory by West Frisia over the Holy Roman Empire

The Battle of Vlaardingen
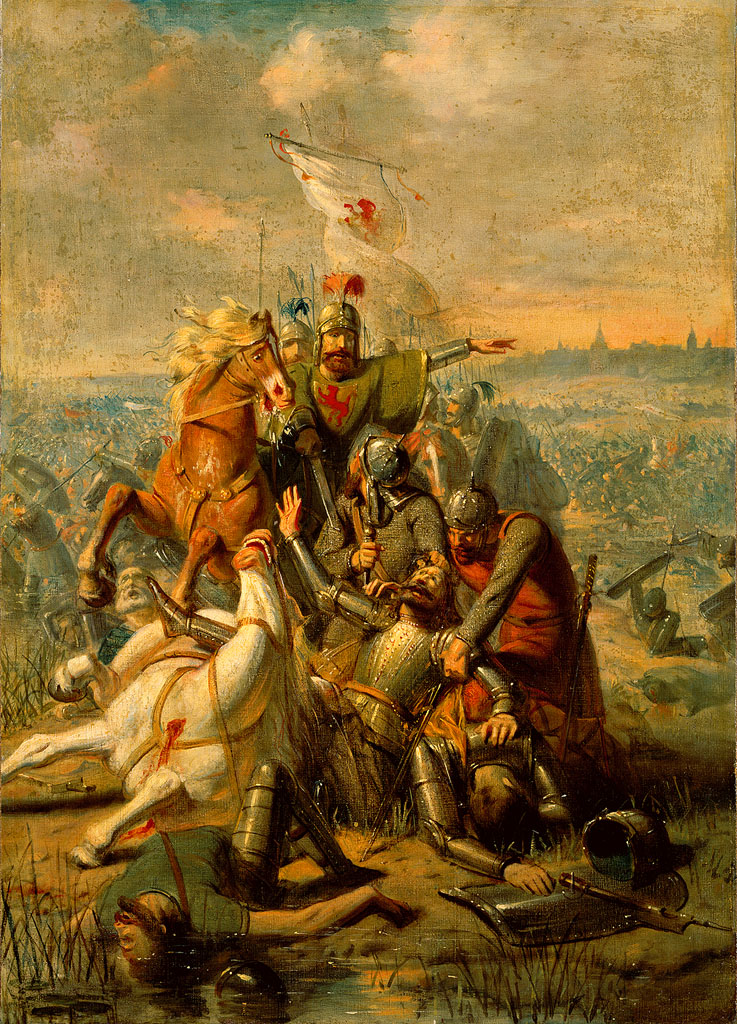
- Romanticised 19th-century painting of the Battle of Vlaardingen by Barend Wijnveld.
Date	29 July 1018
Location	near Vlaardingen, Netherlands
Result	West Frisian victory

Belligerents
Holy Roman Empire; Duchy of Lower Lorraine; Prince-Bishopric of Utrecht; Prince-Bishopric of Liège; Prince-Bishopric of Cambrai; Archdiocese of Cologne	West Frisia: West Frisian settlers from the area of Vlaardingen

Commanders and leaders
Emperor Henry II: Godfrey II, Duke of Lower Lorraine (POW); Adalbold, Prince-Bishop of Utrecht (fled); Baldrick II, Prince-Bishop of Liège (died on way there); Provided troops: Gerard I, Prince-Bishop of Cambrai; Saint Heribert, Archbishop of Cologne	Count Dirk III

Strength
Three imperial legions, estimated to number between 3,000–20,000 professional warriors	Considerably less, from several hundreds to up to 1,000 (see below)

Casualties and losses
3,000+	Minimal

The (First) Battle of Vlaardingen was fought on 29 July 1018 between troops of the Holy Roman Empire and West Frisia (which would later become known as the County of Holland). As a result of a trade dispute, Emperor Henry II sent an army towards West Frisia to subdue the rebellious Count Dirk III. However, the Imperial army was decisively defeated and fled in panic.

Knowledge of the battle is based on three chronicles, written shortly after the date: De diversitate temporum by the monk Alpertus of Metz, the Chronicon of Thietmar, bishop of Merseburg, and in the Cambrai Bishop's Chronicle. Also, recent archaeological discoveries shed some light on Vlaardingen in the 11th century.

== Political background ==
In the early Middle Ages, Vlaardingen was part of the Holy Roman Empire. The emperor at that time was Henry II. The north-western part of the empire, Lower Lotharingia, was ruled by Duke Godfrey of Verdun. Frisia, the most peripheral part of the duchy, fell under the office of Adalbold, bishop of Utrecht, and under Dirk III, to whom the coastal defence in the west had been delegated. Count Dirk had his power base in Vlaardingen, along the banks of the Merwede, where it merged with the Meuse (Maas).

== Causes ==
Emperor Henry II organised his expedition against the Frisians and their count for two reasons. Firstly, the emperor wanted to clear the trade route between the port of Tiel and England: Dirk III forced the sailors who passed by on the Merwede to pay a heavy tribute, and thus he endangered commerce and the tax incomes of the emperor. Secondly, the rebellious count had illegally occupied lands that were claimed by the bishop of Utrecht, and had even built a castle there. The bishoprics of Liege, Trier, and Cologne as well as several abbeys also had possessions in the region.

== Preparations for the expedition ==
At Easter 1018, Emperor Henry II summoned a Diet in Nijmegen. He listened to the complaints of the merchants from Tiel and Bishop Adalbold II of Utrecht. Dirk was present but refused to amend his ways. Henry assigned Adelbold and Duke Godfrey to organise a punitive expedition against the rebellious Count Dirk, who then left the meeting, announcing his intent to foil the imperial plans. Within a few months, an army would be assembled in Tiel, the most important port in the northern Low Countries. The army would sail west, along the rivers Waal and Merwede, to Dirk's stronghold in Vlaardingen.

Three more bishops would supply troops: Baldrick II of Liège, Gerhard of Cambrai, and the Archbishop Heribert of Cologne. Bishop Baldrick participated personally in the trip to Vlaardingen. Shortly beforehand, he had a new crypt constructed under the Basilica of Our Lady in Maastricht, which had collapsed on the day of his departure. This turned out to be a bad omen, because on the way downriver with the Imperial fleet from Tiel to Vlaardingen the bishop fell ill. At Heerewaarden he left his ship and died on the very day of the battle.

== Size of the armies ==
The Cambrai Chronicle states that in Vlaardingen "a thousand have put even twice ten thousand to flight", which would suggest 1,000 West Frisian versus 20,000 Imperial troops. However, this is very likely a literary quotation from the Biblical Book of Deuteronomy (32:30): "How could one man chase a thousand, or two put ten thousand to flight..." It can therefore not be accepted as a realistic indication for the numbers on the battlefield.

According to Thietmar, more than three imperial legions were killed. This implies that the imperial army would have contained at least 3,000 to 20,000 warriors, depending on the definition of a legion. Van Bentum concludes from this that Thietmar meant a legion to be a unit of about 1,000, giving a total of 3,000 Imperial casualties.

Either way, the Cambrai Chronicle and Alpertus both stress the much larger size of the Imperial army, and the considerable difference between the two.

In 2018, Kees Nieuwenhuijsen concluded to much lower numbers. He pointed out that in the eleventh century local military confrontations of this nature usually involved but a few hundred combatants. Dirk's force probably consisted of a very limited number of men-at-arms, reinforced by some hundreds of poorly armed peasants. The settlement of Vlaardingen in this period consisted of only seventeen wooden houses, capable of providing a militia of at best fifty men. To send out a host of three thousand men would therefore have been a definite overkill, equalling the known total size of the standing forces of the four bishoprics involved. He estimated that the imperial troops numbered at most a thousand foot soldiers, transported by about twenty-five ships.

== Course of the battle ==
The fleet with the Imperial army drifted down the river and moored at Vlaardingen. After disembarkation the army marched towards Count Dirk's castle. The locals, who had seen the fleet approaching, had withdrawn within the castle and "on higher grounds". Initially, Godfrey lined his men up around the castle, but then he ordered them to march towards a flat field, because it would be difficult to cross the ditches that were dug all over the place.

During this manoeuvre, the Frisians unexpectedly appeared from an ambush and attacked. Someone cried out that the duke had been killed, upon which panic broke out. The imperial warriors hurried back to their ships, which had been moved to the middle of the stream by now, because of the lowered tide. They sank away in the soggy river bank or they drowned. Meanwhile, the Frisians in the castle gestured and shouted to their countrymen on the higher areas to attack the survivors from the rear. The fleeing soldiers were finished off with javelins.

Only towards the end did Dirk III appear: he rode out of the castle, with a few retainers. They hurried towards Duke Godfrey, who was still alive and fighting, but had been cornered by the Frisians. Thanks to Dirk's intervention the duke was not killed. Dirk captured Godfrey, and took him to his castle. This ended the battle. The number of casualties suffered by the Imperial army was enormous, while the losses on Dirk's side were minimal.

== Aftermath ==
After the battle, the opponents hurried to make peace again. Duke Godfrey was released promptly, and he arranged a reconciliation between Bishop Adelbold and Count Dirk III. Both parties probably realised that the defence of the Frisian coast against possible Viking attacks was more important than the quarrels between themselves.

Nothing is known about the arrangements that the opposing parties made. It is likely that Dirk III had to make some concessions in order to obtain reconciliation, but concessions too were made on their part by the bishop and the emperor. One of which being, perhaps, that a promise was given to leave the count alone. In any event, no more armed conflicts have been recorded along the banks of the Merwede for three decades after the Battle of Vlaardingen.

== Location ==
The early medieval chronicles do not make clear exactly where in Vlaardingen the events took place or which manoeuvres the forces made. There have been several theories about the location.

According to the latest views, the movements of the troops, the actual battle, and the flight, all occurred in the present Vettenoordse polder: a limited area, measuring about 500 x 500 metres, west and south of the present centre of Vlaardingen. Vlaardingen's town archaeologist Tim de Ridder suggests the church hill in the centre of Vlaardingen as the most obvious place for Dirk III's castle. From this spot one has a view over the Merwede, the port, the count's farmstead and the surrounding area, making it a strategic position.

In 2007, ground radar and tracer investigations on the church hill revealed a circular shape, a few metres below the church floor, with a diameter of 27 metres. The material the ring was constructed with is unknown. Because of the location it is hard to carry out any further investigations: in the 12th century, the church has been built straight on this spot. The precise age of the ring is also unknown, but it must date from before the 12th century. It is tempting to regard this discovery as the remains of a ring castle, of the motte-and-bailey type, built around the year 1000 by Count Dirk III.

Earlier studies located the battle a few kilometres away from the present town centre. Rotterdam's city archaeologist Hoek placed the battle three kilometres to the west, around the present municipal boundary with Maassluis, while De Graaf placed it two kilometres to the east, in the Babberspolder. Both views are unlikely.

In the 18th and 19th century, historians stubbornly maintained that Dordrecht, not Vlaardingen, must have been the scene of action. Dordrecht is also situated along the Merwede, 25 km upstream. The 'Battle of Dordrecht' can be found among several historians from that era, and it is still suggested by the odd modern historian.

This hypothesis is untenable, not only because the sources about the battle in 1018 mention only Vlaardingen and not Dordrecht, but also because Dordrecht in the early 11th century was merely the name of a small river. The name of the place first appeared halfway during the 11th century, and no military stronghold is mentioned anywhere. There is no archaeological evidence for an 11th-century settlement.

Only after the floods of the mid-12th century, which dramatically altered the flow of the rivers, would the town acquire some importance. After 1150, Count Floris III established a toll in Dordrecht, and gradually it became the major town in the county of Holland. But that was long after 1018. Modern historians relegate the stories about Dordrecht to the realm of fiction.

Why has Dordrecht been considered the location of the Battle of Vlaardingen for so long? The origin of this misconception lies in the Rymchronyk: a famous forgery, attributed to a Klaas Kolyn, a monk from Egmond Abbey who allegedly had put the history of Holland into verse in the 12th century. In reality, this Klaas Kolyn never existed and the verse chronicle was in fact written around the year 1700. It says, among many other things, that Dirk III founded a fortification and a village along the Merwede, that he named the settlement 'Dordrecht', and that the famous battle in 1018 was fought on that location. The authoritative historian Jan Wagenaar believed this story, and invented the year 1015 for the founding of the town of Dordrecht. Wagenaar has been followed by many colleagues. Afterwards, he admitted that he had been fooled, and subsequently none has seriously believed the authenticity of Klaas Kolyn. Still, the idea that Dordrecht was founded in 1015 and that it was the scene of the battle of 1018 has persisted.

== Significance ==
The Battle of Vlaardingen can be considered as the starting point for a greater de facto autonomy of the later County of Holland. In 1018, in Vlaardingen, Dirk III demonstrated that he would not be told what to do by any overlords. Later in the 11th century, German kings and emperors, and the bishops of Utrecht, made further attempts to subdue the counts of West Frisia. They almost succeeded when Duke Godfrey 'the Hunchback' and Bishop William drove the young Count Dirk V out of Frisia. However, Dirk regained his county, with the help of the Flemish Count Robert. In February 1076 they killed the duke and in June 1076 they defeated the bishop in the Battle of IJsselmonde.

== Commemoration ==
In the summer of 2018, the First Battle of Vlaardingen was commemorated with a historical reenactment in the Broekpolder (recreation area) on the north-west side of the town.

== Sources ==
- Alpertus of Metz, De diversitate temporum, MGH SS IV, 1841, 700–723. The Latin text plus a Dutch translation can be found in H. van Rij, Gebeurtenissen van deze tijd, Alpertus Mettensis / Alpertus van Metz, Verloren, Amsterdam, 1980.
- Thietmar of Merseburg, Chronicon, in: R. Holtzmann, Die Chronik des Bischofs Thietmar von Merseburg, MGH SRG N.S. 9, München, 1935 (reprint 1980).
- Deeds of the Bishops of Cambrai (Gesta episcoporum Cameracensium), MGH SS VII, 1846, 393–525.
- Klaas Kolyn, Rymchronyk, in: G. van Loon, Geschicht-historiaal rym, of Rymchronyk van den heer Klaas Kolyn, Benedictiner monik der abtdye te Egmont, P. de Hondt, ’s-Gravenhage, 1745.
- Nieuwenhuijsen, K. & Ridder, T. de, Ad Flaridingun. Vlaardingen in de elfde eeuw, Verloren, Hilversum, 2012 (all written sources regarding Vlaardingen in the 11th century, in Latin and translated into modern Dutch).
