= Gertrude of Saxony =

Countess of Holland and Countess of Flanders (1030–1113)

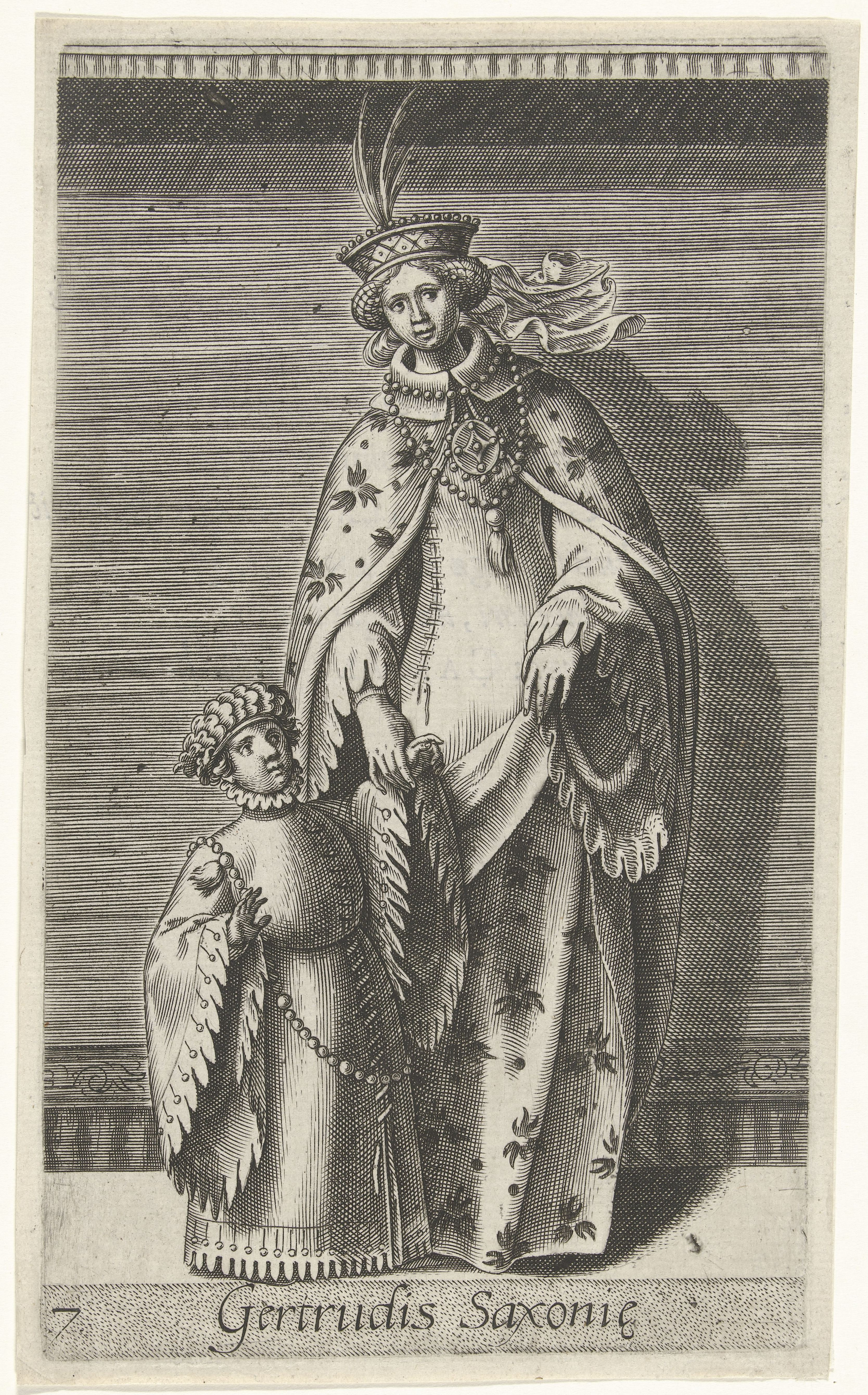
- Born: c. 1030
- Died: 4 August 1113
- Noble family: Billung
- Spouses: Floris I Robert I, Count of Flanders
- Issue: Albert; Dirk V, Count of West-Frisia; Peter; Bertha of Holland; Floris; Matilda; Adela; Robert II, Count of Flanders; Gertrude of Flanders, Duchess of Lorraine; Philip of Loo; Ogiva
- Father: Bernard II, Duke of Saxony
- Mother: Eilika of Schweinfurt

Gertrude of Saxony (c. 1030 – August 4, 1113), also known as Gertrude Billung, was a countess of West-Frisia by marriage to Floris I, Count of West-Frisia, and countess of Flanders by marriage to Robert I, Count of Flanders. She was regent of Holland in 1061-1067 during the minority of her son Dirk V, and regent of Flanders during the absence of her spouse in 1086–1093.

== Biography ==
She was the daughter of Bernard II, Duke of Saxony and Eilika of Schweinfurt.

=== Countess of West-Frisia ===
In c. 1050, she married Floris I, Count of West-Frisia (c. 1017 – June 28, 1061). Upon the death of her spouse in 1061, her son Dirk V became Count of West-Frisia. Since he was a minor, she became regent.

When Dirk V came into power, William I, Bishop of Utrecht, took advantage of the situation, occupying territory that he had claimed in West-Frisia. Gertrude and her son withdrew to the islands of Frisia (Zeeland), leaving William to occupy the disputed lands.

=== Countess of Flanders ===
In 1063 Gertrude married Robert of Flanders (Robert the Frisian), the second son of Baldwin V of Flanders. This act gave Dirk the Imperial Flanders as an appanage – including the islands of Frisia west of the Frisian Scheldt. She and her husband then acted as co-regents of Holland for her son during his minority. When her spouse left for a journey to Jerusalem in 1086–1093, Gertrude served as regent of Flanders during his absence.

== Family and children ==
She had a total of seven children with Floris I, Count of West-Frisia:

1. Albert (b. c. 1051), a canon in Liège
2. Dirk V (c. 1052, Vlaardingen – 17 June 1091)
3. Peter (b. c. 1053), a canon in Liége
4. Bertha (c. 1055 – 15 October 1094, Montreuil-sur-Mer), who married Philip I of France in 1072.
5. Floris (b. c. 1055), a canon in Liége.
6. Matilda (b. c. 1057), who married Adalbert von Saffenburg von Klosterath.
7. Adela (b. c. 1061), who married Baudouin I, Count of Guînes.

From her second marriage to Robert of Flanders she had five children:

1. Robert II of Flanders (c. 1065 – October 5, 1111).
2. Adela (d. 1115), who first married king Canute IV of Denmark, and was the mother of Charles the Good, later count of Flanders. She then married Roger Borsa, duke of Apulia.
3. Gertrude, who married Theodoric II, Duke of Lorraine, and was the mother of Thierry of Alsace, also later count of Flanders.
4. Philip of Loo, whose illegitimate son William of Ypres was also a claimant to the county of Flanders.
5. Ogiva, abbess of Messines.

== Sources ==
- Nicholas, Karen S. (1999). "Countesses as Rulers in Flanders". In Evergates, Theodore (ed.). Aristocratic Women in Medieval France. University of Pennsylvania Press.
- Rider, Jeff (2013). "Vice, Tyranny, Violence, and the Usurpation of Flanders (1071) in Flemish Historiography from 1093 to 1294". In Guynn, Noah D.; Stahuljak, Zrinka (eds.). Violence and the Writing of History in the Medieval Francophone World. Boydell & Brewer.

Vacant Title last held by Othelhilde	Countess consort of Holland; 1049–1061	Vacant Title next held by Othelhilde
Vacant Title last held by Richilde, Countess of Hainaut	Countess consort of Flanders; 1071–1093	Vacant Title next held by Clementia of Burgundy
