= Constance of France, Princess of Antioch =

Princess of Antioch from 1106 to 1111

Constance
- Nuptial of Bohemond and Constance

Princess consort of Antioch
- Tenure: 1106–1111

Countess consort of Troyes
- Tenure: 1093/95 – 1104
- Born: 1078
- Died: 14 September 1126 (aged 47–48)
- Spouse: Hugh of Troyes; Bohemond I of Antioch
- Issue: Manasses of Troyes; Bohemond II of Antioch; John of Antioch
- House: Capet
- Father: Philip I of France
- Mother: Bertha of Holland

Constance of France (1078 – 14 September 1125) was Countess of Troyes from her first marriage and Princess of Antioch from her second marriage. She was regent during the minority of her son. Constance was the eldest of five children and was the only daughter from her father's first marriage. Her brother was Louis VI of France.

== Countess consort of Troyes ==
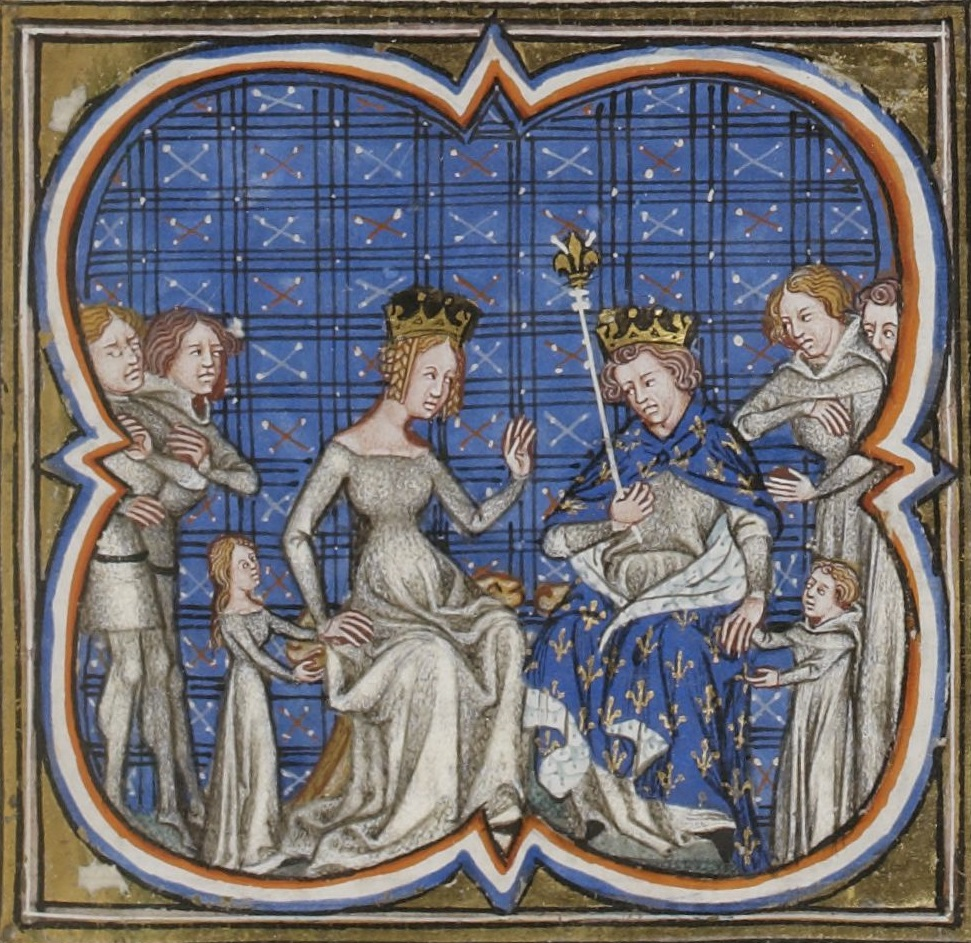
Philip, Bertha, Louis (with Philip) and Constance (with Bertha)

Constance was the daughter of King Philip I of France and Bertha of Holland. Between 1093 and 1095, Phillip I arranged for his daughter, Constance, to marry Hugh, Count of Troyes and Champagne. Philip hoped to influence Hugh's family, the powerful House of Blois, and counter the opposition of Fulk IV, Count of Anjou, after he had kidnapped Fulk's wife, Bertrade. But the union between Constance and Hugh was too late to achieve the desired result, since Stephen II, Count of Blois, Hugh's half-brother, was married and controlled most of the county. As wedding gifts, Constance received from her father, Attigny and the chapel of Saint-Vaubourg.

After ten years of marriage and without any surviving issue (their only known son, Manasses, died young in 1102), Constance demanded an annulment. She obtained a divorce, with the assistance of Ivo of Chartres, at Soissons on 25 December 1104.

== Princess consort of Antioch ==
While at the court of Adela, wife of Stephen, who was acting as regent, Constance was courted by Bohemond I of Antioch. He had just returned to Europe to obtain relief for the Crusaders in the Holy Land and seeking a wife. He impressed audiences across France with gifts of relics from the Holy Land and tales of heroism while fighting the Saracens, gathering a large army in the process. His new-found status won him the hand of Constance. Of this marriage wrote Abbot Suger:

Bohemond came to France to seek by any means he could gain the hand of the Lord Louis' sister Constance, a young lady of excellent breeding, elegant appearance and beautiful face. So great was the reputation for valour of the French kingdom and of the Lord Louis that even the Saracens were terrified by the prospect of that marriage. She was not engaged since she had broken off her agreement to wed Hugh, count of Troyes, and wished to avoid another unsuitable match. The prince of Antioch was experienced and rich both in gifts and promises; he fully deserved the marriage, which was celebrated with great pomp by the bishop of Chartres in the presence of the king, the Lord Louis, and many archbishops, bishops and noblemen of the realm.

The marriage was celebrated in the cathedral of Chartres between 25 March and 26 May 1106, and the festivities were held at the court of Adela, who also took part in negotiations. The groom took the opportunity to encourage the nobility to fight in the Holy Land, and also negotiated for a marriage between Bohemond's nephew Tancred, Prince of Galilee and Constance's half-sister Cecile of France.

After her marriage, Constance accompanied her husband to Apulia, where she gave birth to their first son, Bohemond, future Prince of Antioch, between 1107 and 1108. A second son, John, was also born in Apulia between 1108 and 1111, but died in childhood.

== Regent ==
Constance acted as regent on behalf of her son and took the title of queen as a daughter of a king of France. In 1113, she was expelled by the Baresi who made the archbishop Riso their leader instead. She retained, however, control over Canosa and seized the cathedral, possibly in order to build the mausoleum of Bohemond. Ultimately, Pope Paschal II intervened to allow the bishop back into his own cathedral.

In 1116 she was kidnapped by Alexander of Conversano who imprisoned her in Matera. Upon her release, she returned with 200 knights to ransack his lands. She was back in Bari in 1117 due to her improving relations with bishop Riso. However, Riso was soon murdered for his alliance with Constance and in 1119 she was imprisoned by Grimoald Alferanites, who proclaimed himself Lord of Bari. Constance was released in 1120 on the intervention of Roger II of Sicily and the Pope, but in exchange for her release, Constance had to give up the regency over her son. She died on 14 September 1125.

== Sources ==
- Bouchard, Constance B. (1995). "Capetian dynasty". In Kibler, William W.; Zinn, Grover A. (eds.). Medieval France: An Encyclopedia.
- Hodgson, Natasha R. (2007). Women, Crusading and the Holy Land in Historical Narrative. The Boydell Press.
- Houben, Hubert (2002). Roger II of Sicily: A Ruler Between East and West. Cambridge University Press.
- McDougall, Sara (2017). Royal Bastards: The Birth of Illegitimacy, 800-1230. Oxford University Press.
- Paul, Nicholas L. (2012). To Follow in Their Footsteps: The Crusades and Family Memory in the High Middle Ages. Cornell University Press.
- Runciman, Steven (1952). A History of the Crusades. Vol. II: The Kingdom of Jerusalem and the Frankish East. Cambridge University Press.
- Suger (1992). The deeds of Louis the Fat. Translated by Cusimano, Richard C.; Moorhead, John. Catholic University of America Press.
- Vernon, Clare (26 January 2023). From Byzantine to Norman Italy: Mediterranean Art and Architecture in Medieval Bari. Bloomsbury Publishing. ISBN 978-0-7556-3574-0.
