= Philip I of France =

King of the Franks from 1060 to 1108

Philip I
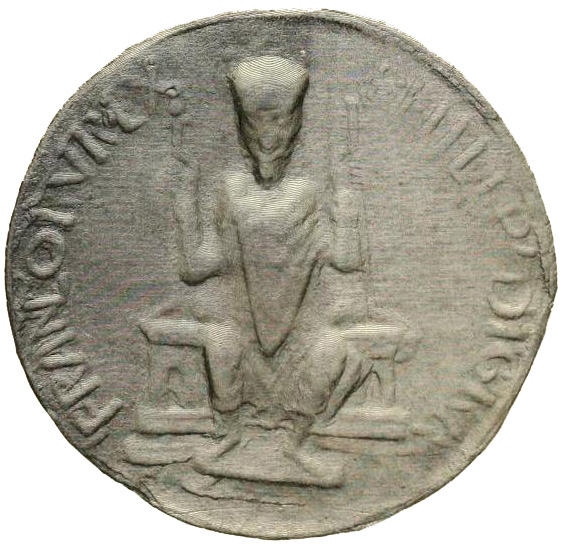
- Philip I's seal

King of the Franks
- Reign: 4 August 1060 – 29 July 1108
- Coronation: 23 May 1059 (as co-king)
- Predecessor: Henry I
- Successor: Louis VI
- Regents: Anne of Kiev and Baldwin V of Flanders (1060–1067)
- Born: c. 1052; Champagne-et-Fontaine, France
- Died: 29 July 1108 (aged 56); Melun, France
- Burial: Fleury Abbey, Saint-Benoît-sur-Loire
- Spouses: Bertha of Holland; Bertrade de Montfort
- Issue more...: Constance, Princess of Antioch; Louis VI; Cecile, Princess of Galilee
- House: Capet
- Father: Henry I of France
- Mother: Anne of Kiev

Philip I (c. 1052 – 29 July 1108), called the Amorous (French: L’Amoureux), was King of the Franks from 1060 to 1108. His reign of nearly 48 years, like that of most of the early Capetians, was extraordinarily long for the time. The monarchy began a modest recovery from the low it had reached during the reign of his father, Henry I, and he added the Vexin region and the viscountcy of Bourges to his royal domaine.

== Early life ==
Philip was born c. 1052 at Champagne-et-Fontaine, the son of Henry I and his wife Anne of Kiev. Unusual for the time in Western Europe, his name was of Greek origin, being bestowed upon him by his mother. In 1059 Henry I had Philip crowned in Reims at the age of seven. Philip had a brother named Hugh, who was slightly younger. Henry also appointed his brother-in-law Baldwin V of Flanders as regent of the kingdom, a role which Baldwin would share with Anne after the death of Henry in 1060. Despite his young age, Philip would rule in his own right, append royal documents with his own seal, and accompany Baldwin to several administrative visits to Flanders. This close association allowed Baldwin to maintain peaceful relationships between the king and his vassals. At age fourteen Philip was knighted by Baldwin's son, Baldwin VI ("the Good").

== Personal rule ==
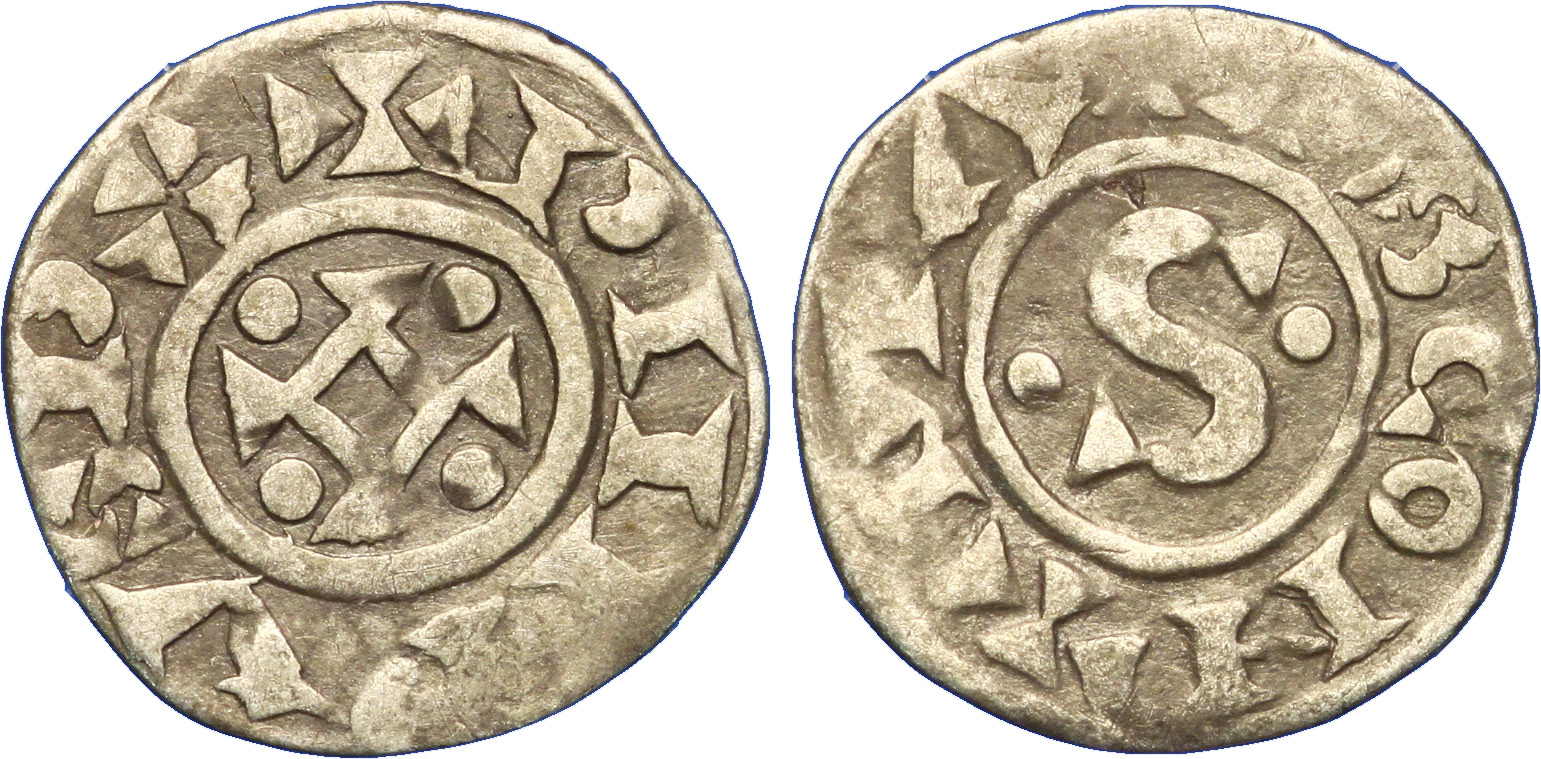
Denier under Philip I

When Baldwin VI died in 1070, his younger brother Robert the Frisian seized Flanders. Philip invaded Flanders in support of Baldwin's widow Richilda, but was defeated by Robert at Cassel in 1071.

Philip appointed Alberic first Constable of France in 1060. A great part of his reign, like his father's, was spent putting down revolts by his power-hungry vassals. In 1076, he summoned a great host to relieve Dol-de-Bretagne and prevent the annexation of Brittany by William the Conqueror, who was forced to capitulate and make his peace with Philip. In 1082, Philip I expanded his demesne with the annexation of the Vexin, in reprisal against Robert Curthose's attack on William's heir, William Rufus. Then in 1100, he took control of Bourges. Philip expanded the royal demesne by incorporating the monasteries of Saint-Denis and Corbie.

In 1106, he married his daughter Constance to Bohemond I of Antioch. The marriage was celebrated in Chartres with great pomp. In 1107, Pope Paschal II met Philip and the future Louis VI in Saint-Denis, cementing a century-long alliance between the kingdom of France and the papacy against the Holy Roman Empire.

Philip's reign also saw an increase of foreign expeditions led by the great lords of his kingdom, starting with the siege of Barbastro in 1064. Although the king was mainly concerned with internal politics, troops from his own demesne joined the ranks of William of Normandy during the Conquest of England in 1066, of Odo of Burgundy during the Franco-Spanish campaign against the Almoravids in 1087, and of the various leaders of the First Crusade, in which his brother Hugh of Vermandois was a major participant.

== Personal life ==
Philip first married Bertha of Holland in 1072. Although the marriage produced the necessary heir, Philip fell in love with Bertrada of Montfort, the wife of Count Fulk IV of Anjou. He repudiated Queen Bertha (claiming she was too fat) and married Countess Bertrada on 15 May 1092. In 1094 following the synod of Autun, he was excommunicated by the papal representative, Hugh of Die, for the first time; after a long silence, Pope Urban II repeated the excommunication at the Council of Clermont in November 1095. Several times the ban was lifted as Philip promised to part with Bertrada, but he always returned to her.

In 1101, the sentence was renewed by Urban II in Poitiers, despite the protest of Duke William IX of Aquitaine, who entered the church with his knights to prevent his suzerain from being excommunicated on his lands. After making a public penance in 1104, Philip received absolution and was reconciled with the Church, and must have kept his involvement with Bertrada discreet. In France, the king was opposed by Bishop Ivo of Chartres, a famous jurist.

== Death ==
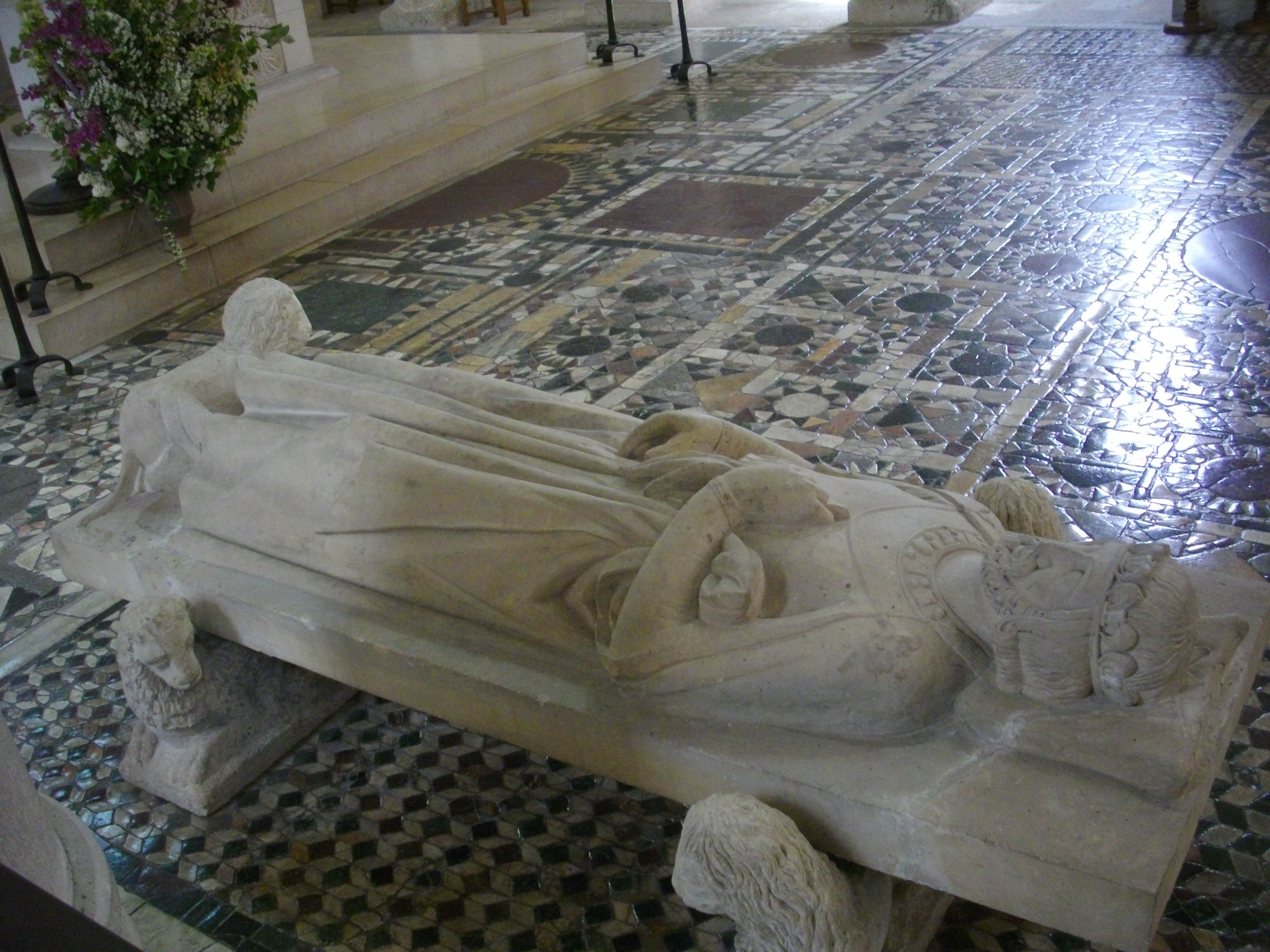
13th-century effigy of King Philip I

Philip died in the castle of Melun on 29 July 1108, and was buried per his request at the monastery of Saint-Benoît-sur-Loire – and not in St Denis among his forefathers. He was succeeded by his son, Louis VI, whose succession was, however, not uncontested. According to Abbot Suger:

… King Philip daily grew feebler. For after he had abducted the Countess of Anjou, he could achieve nothing worthy of the royal dignity; consumed by desire for the lady he had seized, he gave himself up entirely to the satisfaction of his passion. So he lost interest in the affairs of state and, relaxing too much, took no care for his body, well-made and handsome though it was. The only thing that maintained the strength of the state was the fear and love felt for his son and successor. When he was almost sixty, he ceased to be king, breathing his last breath at the castle of Melun-sur-Seine, in the presence of the [future king] Louis... They carried the body in a great procession to the noble monastery of St-Benoît-sur-Loire, where King Philip wished to be buried; there are those who say they heard from his own mouth that he deliberately chose not to be buried among his royal ancestors in the church of St. Denis because he had not treated that church as well as they had, and because among those of so many noble kings, his own tomb would not have counted for much.

== Issue ==
Philip's children with Bertha were:

1. Constance (1078 – 14 September 1126), married Hugh I of Champagne before 1097 and then, after her divorce, to Bohemund I of Antioch in 1106.
2. Louis VI of France (1 December 1081 – 1 August 1137).
3. Henry (1083 – died young).

Philip's children with Bertrade were:

1. Philip, Count of Mantes (1093 – fl. 1123), married Elizabeth, daughter of Guy III of Montlhéry
2. Fleury, Seigneur of Nangis (1095 – July 1119)
3. Cecile (1097 – 1145), married Tancred, Prince of Galilee and then, after his death, to Pons of Tripoli.

== Sources ==
- d'Avray, David, ed. (2014). "Philip I of France and Bertrade". Dissolving Royal Marriages: A Documentary History, 860–1600. Cambridge University Press.
- Barlow, Frank, ed. (1999). The Carmen de Hastingae Proelio of Guy, Bishop of Amiens. Clarendon Press.
- Bradbury, Jim (2007). The Capetians: The History of a Dynasty. Bloomsbury Publishing.
- Brown, Elizabeth A. R. (1990). "Authority, the Family, and the Dead in Late Medieval France". French Historical Studies. 16 (4 Autumn): 803–832. doi:10.2307/286323. JSTOR 286323.
- Bull, Marcus (1993). Knightly Piety and the Lay Response to the First Crusade. Clarendon Press.
- Fliche, Augustin (1912). Le règne de Philippe Ier, roi de France (1060-1108). Société française d'imprimerie et de librairie.
- Gabriele, Matthew (2020). "Not so strange bedfellows: new thoughts on King Philip I of Francia's marriage to Bertrada of Montfort". Journal of Medieval History. 46 (5). Taylor & Francis: 499–512. doi:10.1080/03044181.2020.1814393. ISSN 0304-4181. S2CID 225212068.
- Hallam, Elizabeth (1980). Capetian France: 987–1328. Longman Group Ltd.
- Hodgson, Natasha R. (2007). Women, Crusading and the Holy Land in Historical Narrative. The Boydell Press.
- Housseau, Dom (1767). Recueil des historiens des Gaules et de la France. Vol. XI. Congregation of Saint Maur.
- Huscroft, Richard (2016). Tales from the Long Twelfth Century: The Rise and Fall of the Angevin Empire. Yale University Press.
- McDougall, Sara (2017). Royal Bastards: The Birth of Illegitimacy, 800–1230. Oxford University Press.
- Nicholas, Karen S. (1999). "Countess as Rulers in Flanders". In Evergates, Theodore (ed.). Aristocratic Women in Medieval France. University of Pennsylvania Press.
- Paul, Nicholas L. (2012). To Follow in Their Footsteps: The Crusades and Family Memory in the High Middle Ages. Cornell University Press. ISBN 978-0-801-45097-6. OL 25307863M.
- Petit-Dutaillis, C. (1936). The Feudal Monarchy in France and England:From the 10th to the 13th Century. Translated by Hunt, E.D. Routledge. OL 27789341M.
- Power, Daniel (2004). The Norman Frontier in the Twelfth and Early Thirteenth Centuries. Cambridge University Press.
- Prou, Maurice (1908). Recueil des actes de Philippe Ier, roi de France (1059-1108). Imprimerie Nationale.
- Rolker, Christof (2009). Canon Law and the Letters of Ivo of Chartres. Cambridge University Press.
- Riley-Smith, Jonathan (1997). The First Crusaders, 1095-1131. Cambridge University Press.
- Shepherd, Jonathan (2003). "The 'muddy-road' of Odo Arpin from Bourges to La Charitie-sur-Loire". In Edbury, Peter; Phillips, Jonathan (eds.). The Experience of Crusading. Vol. 1. Cambridge University Press.
- Abbot Suger. "XIII: Of the death of King Philip". Life of King Louis the Fat. Translated by Dunbabin, Jean – via Internet History Sourcebooks Project (Fordham University).
- Somerville, Robert (2011). Pope Urban II's Council of Piacenza. Oxford University Press.
- Strickland, Matthew (2016). Henry the Young King, 1155–1183. Yale University Press.

Philip I of France House of Capet Born: 23 May 1052 Died: 29 July 1108
Regnal titles
Preceded by Henry I	King of the Franks; 4 August 1060 – 29 July 1108	Succeeded by Louis VI
