= Bertha of Holland =

Queen of the Franks from 1072 to 1092

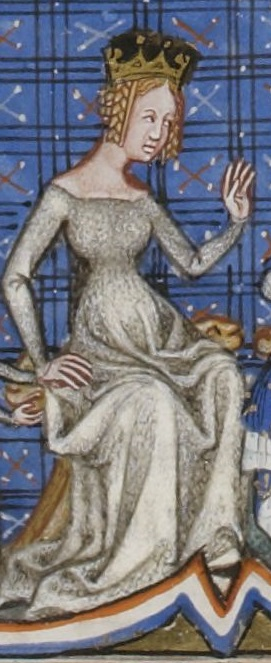

Queen consort of the Franks
- Tenure: 1072–1092
- Born: c. 1055; Vlaardingen, Netherlands
- Died: 15 October 1094 (aged 38–39); Montreuil, Pas-de-Calais, France
- Spouse: Philip I of France
- Issue: Constance, Princess of Antioch; Louis VI of France
- House: Gerulfing
- Father: Floris I, Count of Holland
- Mother: Gertrude of Saxony

Bertha of Holland (c. 1055 – 15 October 1094), also known as Berthe or Bertha of Frisia and erroneously as Berta or Bertrada, was Queen of France from 1072 until 1092, as the first wife of King Philip I of France. Bertha's marriage to the king in 1072 was a result of peace negotiations between him and her stepfather, Count Robert I of Flanders. After nine years of childlessness, the royal couple had three children, including Philip's successor, Louis VI. Philip, however, grew tired of his wife by 1090, and repudiated her in 1092 in order to marry the already married Bertrade of Montfort. That marriage was a scandal since both Philip and Bertrade were already married to other people, at least until Queen Bertha died the next year.

== Early life ==
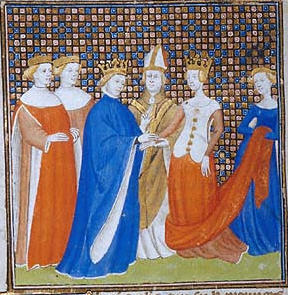
Bertha of Holland marrying King Philip I

Bertha was the daughter of Count Floris I of Holland and Gertrude of Saxony. Bertha had six siblings and both of her parents came from large families. Her father ruled a territory vaguely described as "Friesland west of the Vlie", which is where Bertha spent her childhood. Count Floris I was assassinated in 1061, and two years later her mother remarried to Robert of Flanders. Robert, now known as Robert the Frisian, became guardian of Bertha and her six siblings. In 1070, Robert the Frisian became involved in a war with King Philip I of France over succession to the County of Flanders. Within two years, Robert and Philip concluded a peace treaty which was to be sealed by a marriage; Robert's own daughters were too young, but their half-sister Bertha was just the right age. Robert thus agreed to the marriage of his stepdaughter to King Philip. Bertha married Philip, thus becoming queen of the Franks, probably in 1072.

== Queenship ==
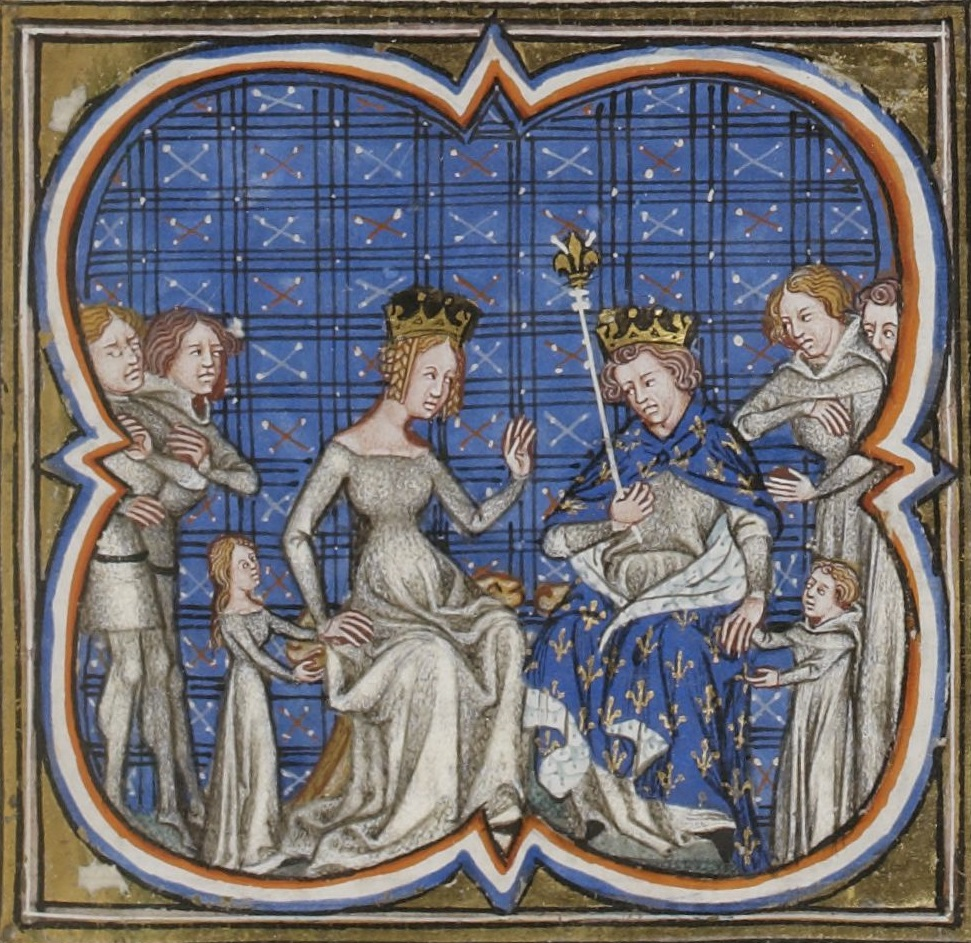
Queen Bertha and King Philip with their children

Bertha was, at the time, the lowest-ranking woman to marry a French king; no suitable princess could be found, since they were all too closely related to Philip for the marriage to any of them to be seen as perfectly valid by the Church. Bertha had no kings among her traceable ancestors and lacked even tenuous links with the Carolingian dynasty that her predecessors could claim. Consequently, contemporary chroniclers did not even try to present her lineage as more exalted than that of a count's daughter. Nevertheless, the shortage of royal candidates made Bertha a suitable choice. The regal title she gained by this marriage was prestigious, but had little meaning, as she was confined to her husband's small royal domain that covered little more than areas around Paris and Orléans.

Little is known about Bertha's queenship. She co-signed only three donation charters. However, she plays a prominent role in the hagiography titled Vita Arnulfi. The hagiography describes how she used her regal power (vi regia) to expel Abbot Gerard of Saint-Médard and reinstate the former abbot, Pontius, who had been removed due to his mismanagement of the abbey. Saint Arnulf of Soissons warned her that doing so would incur the wrath of God and lead to her being driven out of the kingdom into exile, where she would die despised and miserable. The queen furiously refused to listen to him. Although all the extant versions of Vita Arnulfi refer to the queen as Bertrada, it is clear that the queen mentioned in the hagiography is Bertha of Holland, given that the events mentioned in it took place while Bertha was queen and more than a decade before she was replaced as such by Bertrade (or Bertrada) of Montfort. The hagiography, however, was written after Bertha died and during Bertrade's queenship, which might explain the name confusion.

=== Childlessness ===
For six years, King Philip and Queen Bertha were troubled by their childlessness and especially by the lack of male children, which was not unusual among the early male members of the House of Capet. Things suddenly took a different course, however, when the Queen had three children in quick succession: a daughter named Constance in 1078 and two sons, the long-hoped heir named Louis in 1081 and Henry, born in 1083 and who died in infancy. The birth of the long-awaited heir apparent had such a great impact that a story of a miracle developed around it. Reportedly, the couple's fertility was only restored thanks to the prayers of a hermit, Saint Arnulf of Soissons. Arnulf informed Queen Bertha that she was expecting a son and that it would be appropriate to give him the Carolingian name of Louis. A daughter, Constance, soon followed. Bertha gave birth to one more son, named Henry, but he appears to have died in infancy or childhood.

== Repudiation ==
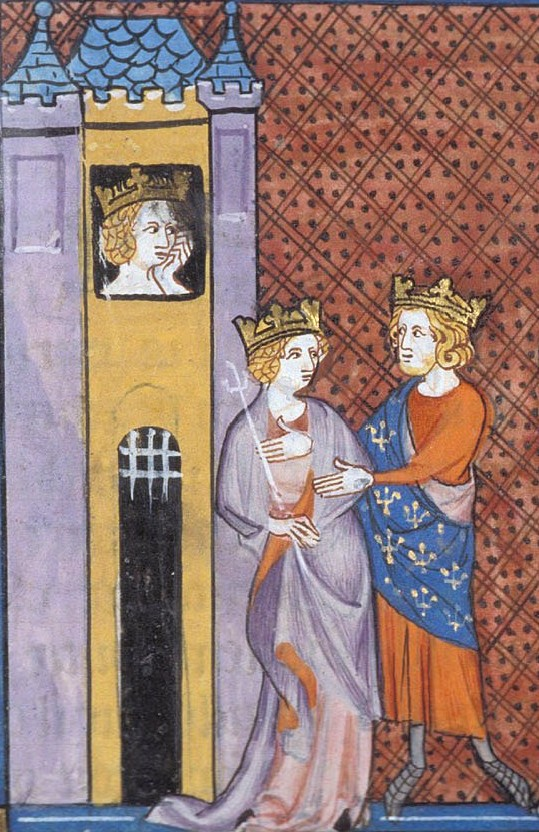
King Philip marries Countess Bertrada, with Queen Bertha imprisoned in a castle

After the birth of three children, the marriage began breaking apart. The king became tired of his wife but the reasons are unclear. Contemporary chroniclers give different explanations. According to the English historian William of Malmesbury, Philip complained that Bertha was "too fat", though he was himself becoming too obese to ride a horse. In 1092, Philip announced his decision to divorce "the noble and virtuous daughter of Florent count of Holland and stepdaughter of Robert the Frisian" and marry the already married Bertrade of Montfort, the wife of Count Fulk IV of Anjou. The repudiated queen withdrew to the fortress of Montreuil-sur-Mer, which was part of her dower land. By doing so, Philip infuriated his stepfather-in-law. Bertha died soon thereafter, on 15 October 1094. This simplified matters for Philip who was now free to remarry—though not the countess of Anjou, whose husband Fulk was still living.

In 1108, Philip died. The son of the queen who had been repudiated ostensibly for her obesity ascended the French throne as Louis VI. Both he and her fraternal nephew, Count Floris II of Holland, were nicknamed "the Fat".

== Issue ==
Together, Philip and Bertha had three children:

1. Constance (1078 – 14 September 1126), married Hugh I of Champagne before 1097 and then, after her divorce, to Bohemund I of Antioch in 1106.
2. Louis VI of France (1 December 1081 – 1 August 1137).
3. Henry (b. 1083), died young.

French royalty
Preceded by Anne of Kiev	Queen consort of the Franks; 1072–1092	Succeeded by Bertrade of Montfort
