= Champagne-et-Fontaine =

- Commune
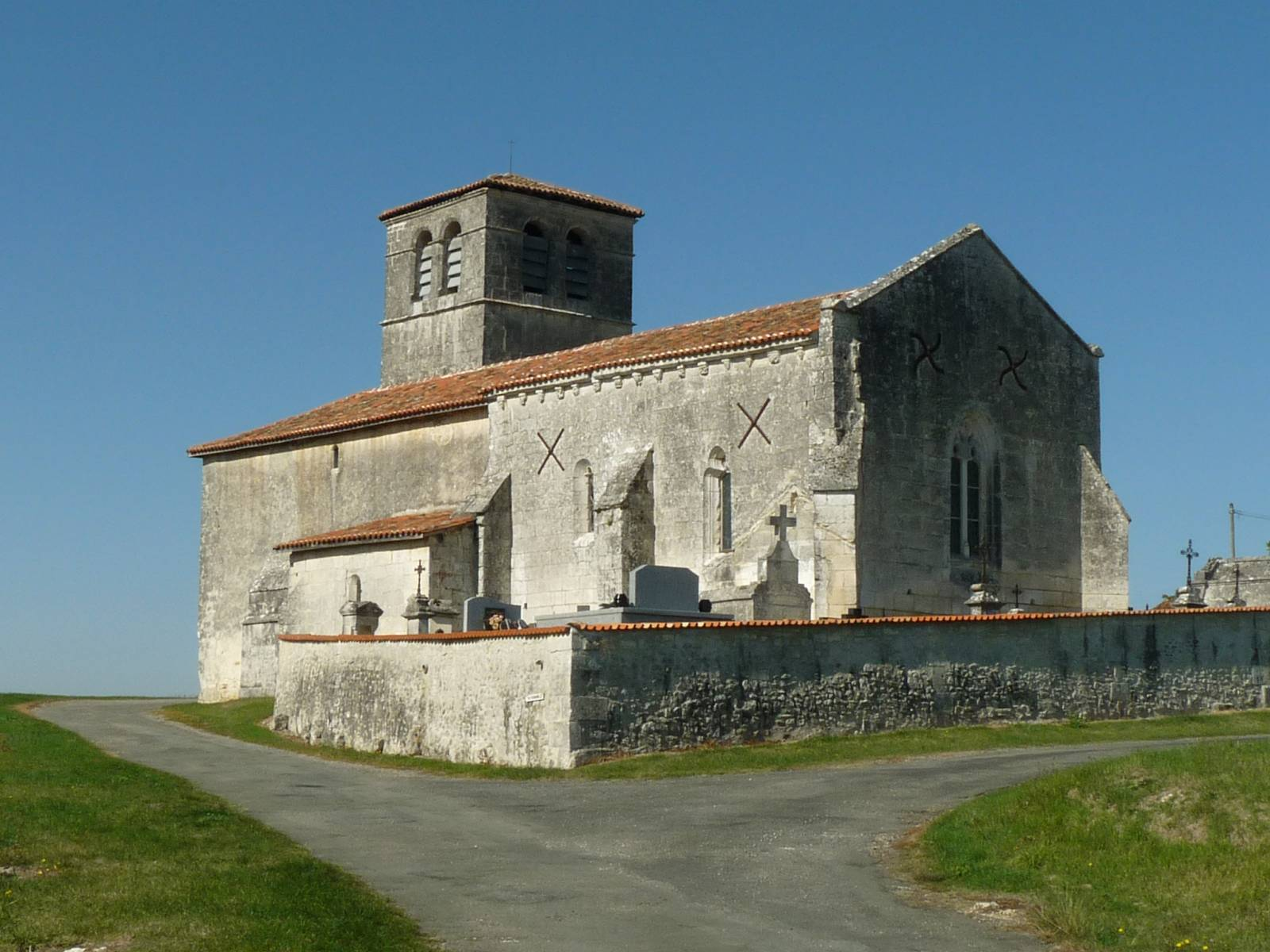
- The church in Fontaines

- Coat of arms
- Location of Champagne-et-Fontaine
- Location within France Location within Nouvelle-Aquitaine
- Coordinates: 45°25′21″N 0°19′05″E
- Country: France
- Region: Nouvelle-Aquitaine
- Department: Dordogne
- Arrondissement: Périgueux
- Canton: Ribérac

Government
  - Mayor (2020–2026): Pascal Devars
- Area^{1}: 25.04 km^{2} (9.67 sq mi)
- Elevation: 95 m (312 ft)
- Highest elevation: 169 m (554 ft)
- Lowest elevation: 77 m (253 ft)
- Population (2023): 346
  - Density: 13.8/km^{2} (35.8/sq mi)
- Time zone: UTC+01:00 (CET)
  - Summer (DST): UTC+02:00 (CEST)
- INSEE/Postal code: 24097 /24320
- ^{1} French Land Register data, which excludes lakes, ponds, glaciers > 1 km^{2} (0.386 sq mi or 247 acres) and river estuaries.

Champagne-et-Fontaine (French pronunciation: [ʃɑ̃paɲ e fɔ̃tɛn]; Occitan: Champanha e Fontanas) is a commune in the Dordogne department in Nouvelle-Aquitaine in southwestern France.

Champagne-et-Fontaine is the birthplace of Philip I of France.

== Geography ==
The Lizonne flows southwestward through the northern part of the commune and forms part of its western border.

== Population ==
Historical population
Year	Pop.	±% p.a.
1968	600	—
1975	511	−2.27%
1982	477	−0.98%
1990	415	−1.73%
1999	431	+0.42%
2007	406	−0.74%
2012	401	−0.25%
2017	387	−0.71%
2023	346	−1.85%
Source: INSEE

== Villages, hamlets, and localities ==
- Ambournet
- au Montey
- au Paris
- au Petit Bois
- au Rouge
- aux Pêcheries
- Basse Foucaudie
- Bois des Chambres
- Carabin
- Champagne
- Château de la Ligerie
- Château du Clauzurou
- Chaumont
- Chez Bidou
- Chez le Tard
- Chez Peillou
- Chez Robin
- Chez Trinquet
- Combe du Prieur
- Cormeille
- Espinasse
- Fombouille
- Fontaine
- Fontaine de Notre-Dame
- Grange du Breuil
- Grange du Mazac
- Grange Neuve
- Grelet
- Gué de Pompeigne
- Haute Foucaudie
- Jaufrenie
- Jovelle
- la Boige
- la Borie
- la Bourelie
- la Croix du Rapt
- la Divinie
- la Faye
- la Feuillade Basse
- la Feuillade Haute
- la Forêt
- la Genevrière
- la Richardie
- la Vaure
- la Vergne
- l'Âge
- Lardinie
- le Cluzeau
- le Combeau
- le Gouyot
- le Grafeuil
- le Grand Clos
- le Luc
- le Mazac
- le Nept
- le Pas de Fontaine
- le Petit Breuil
- le Petit Cluzeau
- le Petit Ferrier
- le Petit Rochat
- le Pigeonnier
- le Quinze
- le Repaire
- le Roc
- le Vivier
- les Bigonnies
- les Chaumes
- les Écures
- les Gacheries
- les Gagneries
- les Gravelles
- les Grilles
- les Jarriges
- les Jartres
- les Mottes
- les Vergnes
- Maine Vignau
- Maison Neuve
- Moulin Chaudeau
- Moulin de Rochat
- Moulin du Vivier
- Pas Vieux
- Plantigarde
- Pompeigne
- Puy de Versac
- Puy Tirel
- Ruisseau de Fontaine
- Saint-Morézi
- Saumont
- Terres du Fougereau
- Veyrines
- Villard

== Personalities ==
For some twenty years the family of Charles de Gaulle owned a country home there called La Ligerie where de Gaulle spent his summers as a youngster. The de Gaulle family sold La Ligerie in 1920.

== See also ==
- Communes of the Dordogne department
