= Dirk III of Holland =

Count of Holland from 993 to 1039

Dirk III
- Count in Frisia
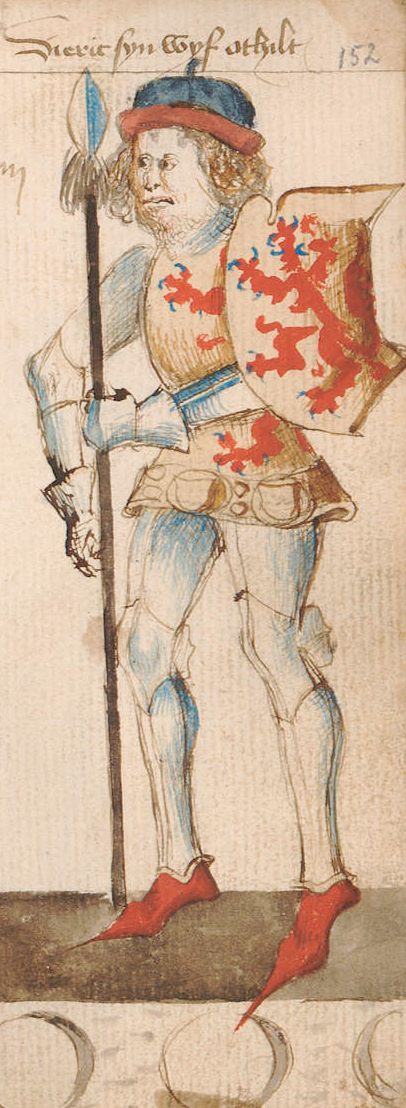
- Dirk III, Count of Holland depicted by Hendrik van Heessel
- Reign: 1005 – 27 May 1039
- Predecessor: Arnulf
- Successor: Dirk IV
- Born: c. 982
- Died: 27 May 1039
- Burial: Egmond
- Spouse: Othelindis
- Issue: Dirk IV; Floris I
- House: of Holland
- Father: Arnulf
- Mother: Luitgard of Luxemburg

Dirk III (also called Dirik or Theodoric) was the count with jurisdiction over what would become the county of Holland, often referred to in this period as "West Frisia", from 993 to 27 May 1039. Until 1005, this was under regency of his mother. It is thought that Dirk III went on pilgrimage to the Holy Land around 1030, hence his nickname of Hierosolymita ("the Jerusalemite" in Latin).

== The county ==
The area over which Dirk ruled was called Holland for the first time only in 1101 and was known as a southern part of Frisia at this time. Modern writers often distinguish it as "West Friesland". At the time, this Western Frisia was very different from the area as it exists today (forming the modern provinces of North Holland and South Holland). Most of the territory was boggy and subject to constant flooding and hence very sparsely populated. The main areas of habitation were in the dunes at the coast and on heightened areas near the rivers.

== Luitgard's regency ==
Count Dirk was a member of the house of Holland, an important family within Germany at that time. His mother, Luitgard of Luxemburg, was regent in the county while Dirk was still a minor, from 993 to 1005. She was the sister-in-law of Emperor Henry II, and with his help, she managed to maintain the county for her son. After Dirk assumed the government of the county, she still used her family connections to acquire imperial assistance, in one instance an imperial army helped Dirk suppress a Frisian revolt. The chronicle of the bishops of Cambrai, in its entry for 1017, openly complains that the sisters-in-law of Emperor Henry II had been arousing rebellions against the status quo, which it associated with their bishop Gerard of Florennes and his cousin Godfrey II, Duke of Lower Lorraine, who led the unsuccessful campaign against Dirk III in 1018 at the Battle of Vlaardingen.

== Conflict with the emperor ==
Prior to 1018, Count Dirk III was a vassal of Henry II, but the bishops of Trier, Utrecht and Cologne all contested the ownership of Dirk's fiefdom, which was in a strategically important location. Utrecht, situated in the Rhine delta, was the largest trading town of the German kings in the area and traders had to sail through the territories of Dirk III, by way of the Rhine and Vecht rivers, in order to reach the North Sea. Also, the German kings and emperors were frequently resident in Utrecht and the nearby estate of Nijmegen. Another trade route that ran through Dirk's territory was from the city of Tiel to England.

It was along this second route that Count Dirk built a stronghold at Vlaardingen, in a newly habitable area where many Frisians had recently settled by his invitation. He was not permitted to levy tolls or hinder trade in any way, but eventually he defied imperial rule. Working together with the Frisians now living in the area, he stopped passing ships, demanding payment of tolls. Merchants from the town of Tiel sent alarmed messages to the king and Bishop Adelbold of Utrecht about acts of violence against them by Dirk's men. Emperor Henry then decided to end Dirk III's reign and awarded his lands to Bishop Adelbold.

== The Battle of Vlaardingen and its aftermath ==
A large imperial army, made up of troops supplied by the various bishops of region, under the command of Godfrey II, Duke of Lower Lorraine, then headed for the stronghold at Vlaardingen. The ensuing Battle of Vlaardingen was a disaster for the imperial army and a tremendous victory for Count Dirk; many of the imperial commanders perished and Duke Godfrey was captured. Following this victory, Dirk III was permitted to keep his lands and he continued levying tolls. Later on, Dirk also managed to acquire more lands east of his previous domains at the expense of the Bishop of Utrecht. After the death of Emperor Henry II in 1024, Dirk supported Conrad II for the succession to the kingship.

After Count Dirk III's death in 1039, imperial armies were sent on a few more occasions seeking to reclaim the lands held by the Frisian counts. The powerful Robert I, Count of Flanders (called Robert the Frisian) helped Dirk V, grandson of Dirk III and his own stepson, to restore Frisia to the counts.

== Family ==
Dirk III married Othelindis, perhaps daughter of Bernard I, Duke of Saxony. They had (at least) two children:

- Dirk, who succeeded his father as Dirk IV
- Floris, who succeeded his brother as Floris I

There is also evidence for two daughters: Bertrada, who married Dietrich I. von Katlenburg, and Suanhildis (Swanhilde) who married Emmo van Loon, Count of Loon.

After Dirk's death on 27 May 1039, his widow went back to Saxony, where she died on 31 March 1044. Dirk was buried at Egmond Abbey.

Preceded by Arnulf	Count of Friesland west of the Vlie; 993–1039	Succeeded by Dirk IV
