= Floris I =

- Count in Frisia
- Reign: 13 January 1049 – 28 June 1061
- Predecessor: Dirk IV
- Successor: Dirk V
- Born: c. 1017; Vlaardingen, Netherlands
- Died: June 28, 1061; Nederhemert, Netherlands
- Burial: Egmond
- Spouse: Gertrude of Saxony
- Issue: Dirk V Floris; Bertha
- House: of Holland
- Father: Dirk III
- Mother: Othelindis

Floris I (born c. 1017 in Vlaardingen – 28 June 1061) was count of Holland, then called Frisia west of the Vlie, from 1049 to 1061.

Floris was born in Vlaardingen in the Netherlands. He was a son of Dirk III and Othelindis of Nordmark. Floris succeeded his brother Dirk IV, who was murdered in 1049. He married c. 1050 Gertrude, daughter of Duke Bernard II of Saxony, and had at least three children with her: Dirk V (c. 1052–1091), Bertha (c. 1055–1094), who became queen of France, and Floris (born c. 1055), who became a canon at Liége.

Floris was involved in a war of a few Lotharingian vassals against the imperial authority. On a retreat from Zaltbommel, he was ambushed and killed in battle at Hamerth on 28 June 1061. His son Dirk V succeeded him. In 1063, Gertrude married Robert I of Flanders, who ruled Frisia as regent and acted as guardian for her children with Floris.

Preceded by Dirk IV	Count of Friesland west of the Vlie; 1049–1061	Succeeded by Dirk V
