= Dirk IV of Holland =

Dirk IV
- Count in Frisia
- Reign: 27 May 1039 – 13 January 1049
- Predecessor: Dirk III
- Successor: Floris I
- Born: 1020/1030
- Died: January 13, 1049; Dordrecht
- Burial: Egmond
- Father: Dirk III
- Mother: Othelindis

Dirk IV (ca. 1020/1030 – 13 January 1049) was Count of Holland from 1039 to 1049 (which was called Frisia at that time). Dirk's date of birth is unknown but it was probably ca. 1030 or shortly before, he was described as "adolescent" at the time of his death. His base of operations was the stronghold his father built at Vlaardingen. Contemporary chroniclers referred to him (in Latin) as "Theodericus de Phlardirtinga" (Vlaardingen) and as margrave thereof. The exact extent of his domain is not known, but at one time or another it stretched north to at least Rijnsburg and east to roughly Aalburg.

Dirk IV continued the policy of his father Dirk III to enlarge his possessions, developing and colonizing the low-lying peat areas of Holland and Utrecht. As a result, he came into conflict with the bishop of Utrecht, other bishops and monasteries in the surrounding area. Because of this, Emperor Henry III personally led an expedition against him in 1046, forcing Dirk to return some areas he had occupied. Shortly after the emperor had left however, Dirk started to plunder the territories of the bishops of Utrecht and Liège and made alliances with Godfrey III, Duke of Lower Lorraine and the counts of Hainaut and Flanders. After this, in 1047, the emperor returned and occupied the stronghold at Rijnsburg, which was completely destroyed. During, the retreat however, the imperial army suffered severe losses, causing Dirk's allies to rise in open revolt as well in his support. On 13 January 1049 Dirk was ambushed near Dordrecht by a force of the bishops of Utrecht, Liège and Metz and killed.

Dirk IV never married and died childless. He was succeeded by his younger brother Floris.

Preceded by Dirk III	Count of Friesland west of the Vlie; 1039–1049	Succeeded by Floris I
