= Dirk V =

First Count of the Northern Netherlands

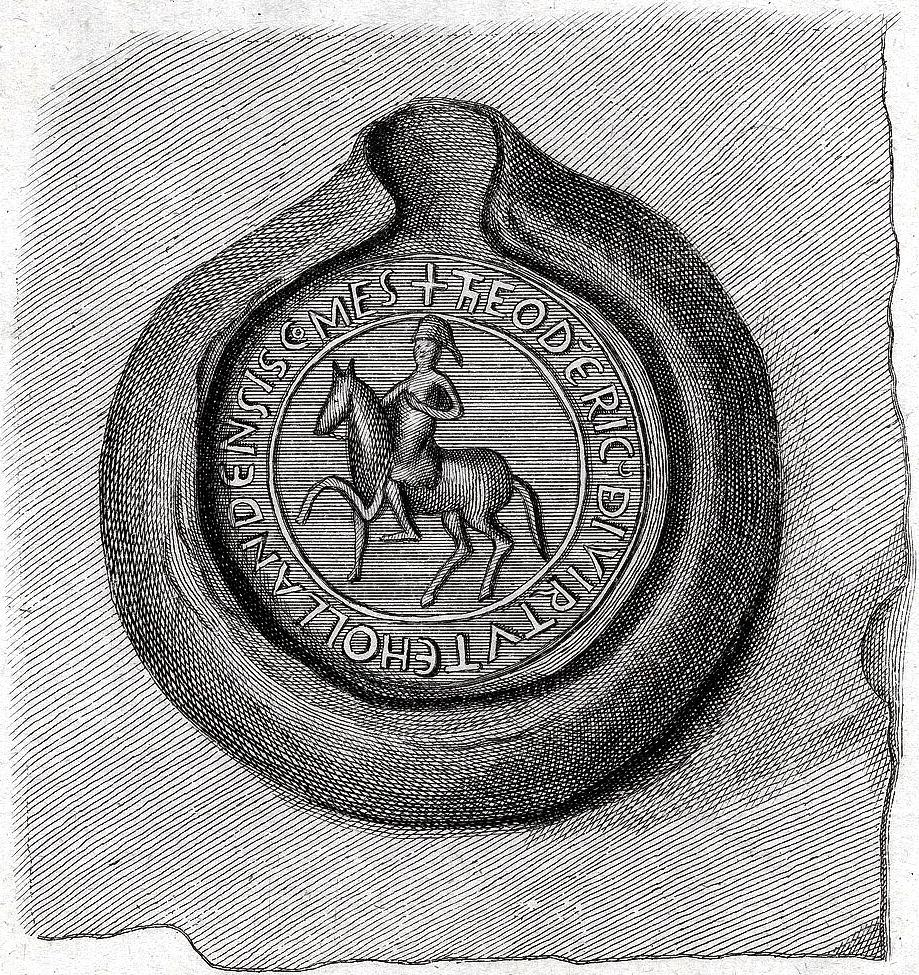
Seal of Dirk V

Dirk V (c. 1052 – June 17, 1091) was Count of West-Frisia from 1061 to 1091.

Dirk V succeeded his father, Floris I, under the guardianship of his mother, Gertrude of Saxony. William I, Bishop of Utrecht, took advantage of the young ruler, occupying territory that he had claimed in Holland. William's claim was confirmed by two charters of the emperor Henry IV. (April 30, 1064 and May 2, 1064). Dirk only retained possession of lands west of the Vlie and around the mouths of the Rhine.

Gertrude and her son withdrew to the islands of (West) Frisia (Zeeland), leaving William to occupy the disputed lands. In 1063 Gertrude married Robert of Flanders (Robert the Frisian), the second son of Baldwin V of Flanders. Baldwin gave Dirk the Imperial Flanders as an appanage - including the islands of Frisia west of the Frisian Scheldt river. Robert then became his stepson's guardian, gaining control of the islands east of the Scheldt. Robert managed to conquer Kennemerland (north of North Holland), but held it only briefly.

Robert therefore, in both his own right and that of Dirk, was now the ruler of all Frisia. The death of his brother Baldwin VI in 1070 led to civil war in Flanders. The claim of Robert to the guardianship of his nephew Arnulf III was disputed by Richilde, Countess of Mons and Hainaut, the widow of Baldwin VI. The issue was decided by Robert's victory at Cassel (February 1071), where Arnulf was killed and Richilda taken prisoner.

The war in Holland and Frisia became part of a large conflict from 1075 onwards. The pope had excommunicated the emperor. The bishop of Utrecht supported the emperor, while the count of Holland supported Pope Gregory VII and anti-king Rudolphe.

While Robert was thus engaged in Flanders, an effort was made to recover the County of Holland and other lands now held by William of Utrecht. The people rose in revolt, but were brought back under Episcopal rule by an army under the command of Godfrey IV (the Hunchback), duke of Lower Lorraine, by order of the emperor (Henry IV). In 1076, at the request of William, Duke Godfrey visited his domains in the Frisian borderland. At Delft, the duke was murdered by revolutionaries (February 26, 1076). William of Utrecht died on April 17, 1076.

Dirk V, now managing his own estate, was quick to take advantage of this favorable juncture. With the help of Robert (his stepfather) he raised an army and besieged Conrad of Utrecht, the successor of William, in the castle of Ysselmonde, taking him prisoner. The bishop purchased his liberty by surrendering all claim to the disputed lands.

Dirk V was succeeded by his son Floris II upon his death in 1091. He was buried in the Egmond Abbey.

== Sources ==
- Müller, P.L. (1877). Dietrich V. In: Allgemeine Deutsche Biographie (ADB) (in German). Leipzig: Duncker & Humblot. p. 178.

Preceded by Floris I	Count of Friesland west of the Vlie; 1061–1091	Succeeded by Floris II
