= Conrad (bishop of Utrecht) =

- Bishop of Utrecht
- Church: Catholic Church
- Diocese: Archdiocese of Utrecht
- In office: 1076–14 April 1099

Personal details
- Died: 14 April 1099

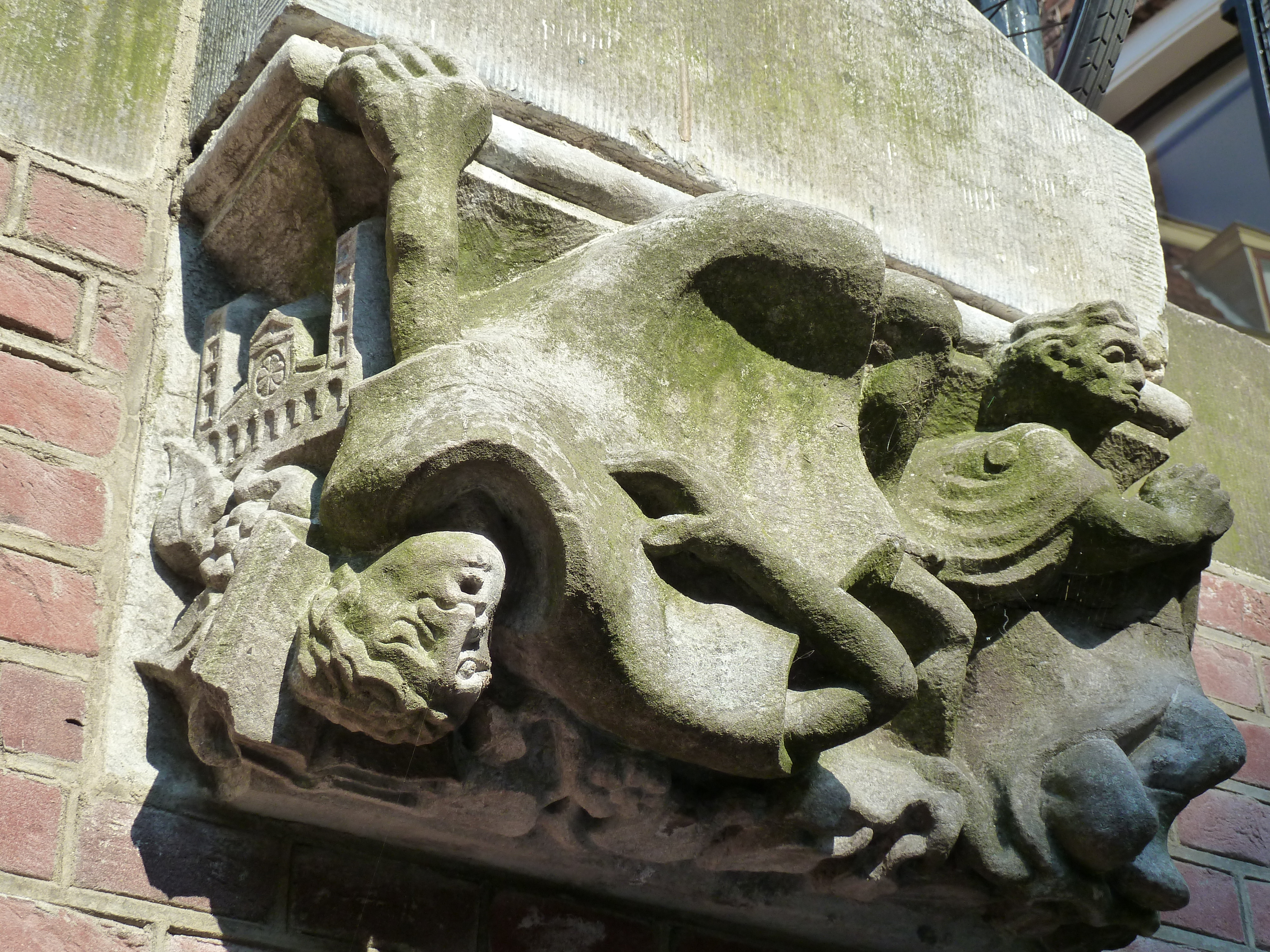
The assassination of bishop Conrad

Conrad was bishop of Utrecht between 1076 and 1099.

Before becoming bishop he was chamberlain of Archbishop Anno II of Cologne and, for a time, tutor of Prince Henry, the future Emperor Henry IV. When the excommunicated Bishop William of Utrecht died in 1076, the emperor gave the episcopal see of Utrecht to Conrad, who, like his predecessor, sided with Henry IV in his conflicts with Gregory VII, and at the Synod of Brixen in 1080 even condemned the pope as a heretic.

The contemporary annalist, Lambert of Hersfeld, calls Conrad a schismatic bishop, unworthy of holding an episcopal see. In a battle with Robert I, Count of Flanders, Conrad was defeated, afterwards taken captive and compelled to yield part of West Frisia to Robert. This territorial loss of the bishop was compensated by the emperor, who, in 1077, gave him the district of Stavoren, and in 1086 added the two other Frisian districts, Oostergo and Westergo. He was in Rome when king Henry was crowned by the pope as emperor in 1084.

Conrad is the founder and architect of the collegiate church of Notre-Dame at Utrecht. He was assassinated, shortly after completing the Holy Sacrifice, by his Frisian architect whom he had discharged, and who, in the opinion of some, was instigated by a certain nobleman whose domains Conrad held unjustly. The church of Saint Mary in Utrecht got a chapter during his reign.

He is said to have written the discourse Pro Imperatore contra Papam, and to have delivered it at the Synod of Gerstungen in 1085. It is inserted by Johannes Aventinus (d. 1534) in his Vita Henrici IV and by Goldast (d. 1635) in his Pro Henrico IV imperatore. Hefele is of the opinion that the discourse is falsely attributed to Conrad of Utrecht, and that Aventinus himself is the author.

He was killed at Utrecht by a Frisian on 14 April 1099.

| Preceded by William I | Bishop of Utrecht; 1076–1099 | Succeeded by Burchard |
