= William I (bishop of Utrecht) =

Bishop of Utrecht

- Bishop of Utrecht
- Church: Catholic Church
- Diocese: Utrecht
- In office: 1054–1076

Personal details
- Died: 1076

William I served as Bishop of Utrecht from 1054 until his death in 1076.

He was a typical representative of the German imperial system in which bishops (who couldn't inherit their lands) were the main officials of the empire. He was a loyal follower of king Henry IV of Germany. William was appointed when a war was going on against West Frisia (later part of the county of Holland), which was resisting imperial authority. The imperial army conquered large parts of West Frisia in 1061, when Dirk V became count. King Henry gave the whole county to the bishopric of Utrecht in 1064. The whole of West Frisia was conquered in 1076 with the help of duke Godfrey III.

William took part in the Great German Pilgrimage of 1064–65.

William supported the king during the Investiture Controversy. He called for disobedience towards Gregory VII at the synod of Worms in 1076. Much of West Frisia was recovered by count Dirk after the death of bishop William in the same year.

Catholic Church titles
Preceded by Bernold	Bishop of Utrecht; 1054–1076	Succeeded by Conrad
