= Sara McDougall =

American professor of history

Sara McDougall is a professor of history at the John Jay College of Criminal Justice and is an appointed faculty member at the CUNY Graduate Center for the fields of Biography and Memoir, French, History, and Medieval Studies. Her research focuses on the topics of the judicial decisions on gender in the Middle Ages and how medieval law and religion influenced legal outcomes.

== Education ==
Graduating with a bachelor's degree from Boston University, McDougall also completed a Master's degree from the same university in 2003, with a minor in music. She was a part of Boston University's College of Arts & Sciences and originally was interested in becoming an opera singer before switching her focus to history. She went on to earn a Ph.D. from Yale University in 2009 and became a Golieb Fellow in Legal History that same year at the New York University School of Law. While working on her Ph.D., she spent one summer traveling across France to search through church records alongside her interests in gender, marriage, and legal decisions.

== Career ==
After completing her degrees, McDougall became an assistant professor at the John Jay College of Criminal Justice and later a full professor. For her first publication in 2012, Bigamy and Christian Identity in Late Medieval Champagne, McDougall searched through records in Troyes that listed Church investigations of bigamy. She found that while husbands usually had serious punishments if found guilty, most women were merely fined a small amount, which McDougall referred to as a "useful misogyny" at the time. Since men were viewed as the head of household, they were considered responsible for their own actions and the actions of their spouse.

In 2020, McDougall acted as the Norman Freehling Visiting Professor for the University of Michigan's Institute for the Humanities. Her research project for that semester was titled "Surviving Illicit Pregnancy in Medieval Christian France".

== Bibliography ==
- — (2026). Justice for Jehanne: The Tale of a Medieval Survivor. Princeton University Press. p. 328. ISBN 9780691268910.
- —; Emsley, Clive, eds. (2023). A Global History of Crime and Punishment in the Renaissance. Bloomsbury Academic. p. 219. ISBN 9781472584618.
- — (2017). Royal Bastards: The Birth of Illegitimacy, 800-1230. Oxford University Press. p. 310. ISBN 9780198785828.
- — (2012). Bigamy and Christian Identity in Late Medieval Champagne. University of Pennsylvania Press. p. 240. ISBN 9780812206548.
