= Château de Sagonne =

Castle in Centre-Val de Loire, France

Coordinates: 46°51′00″N 2°49′35″E

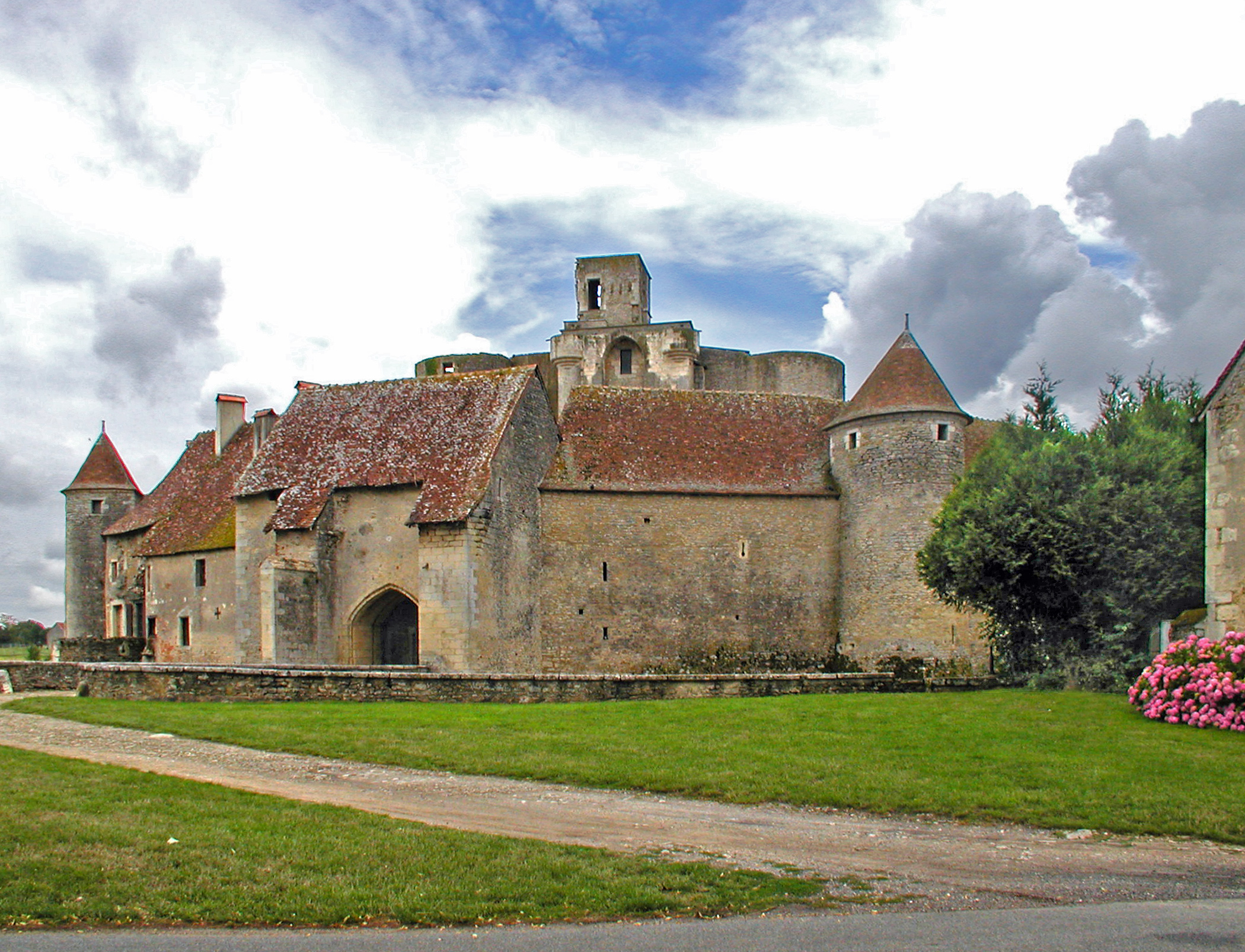

The Château de Sagonne is a castle in the commune of Sagonne in the Cher département of France.

== History ==
The castle was the fortress of the Sancerre family, who had held the seigneurie from the 10th century. It was built during the 14th century to control the road between Bourges and Sancoins. The estate was bought by the Babou family in 1546; during the rest of the 16th century they made significant alterations. The castle was acquired by the noted Baroque architect, Jules Hardouin Mansart, in 1699 and he made important alterations in the early 18th century. The castle was broken up during the French Revolution and its contents and materials sold.

The enceinte originally comprised eight towers and two gateways. Wanting a more panoramic view, Mansart demolished the curtain walls on the east and created gardens. The west and north sides of the enceinte still exist. Also still visible are the pillars supporting the base of the bartizans (watch towers), parts of the portcullis in its housing and door panels from the 16th century. Under the Gothic arch vault can be seen the start of the staircase leading to the upper floors. Four towers remain. The facade looking onto the courtyard dates from the 15th century and has moulded windows as well as the openings made in the 18th century at the end of the building. Most of the doors still have their original decorative moulding. All of the buildings were covered with plafonds à la française (French-style ceilings: joists the same width as the spaces between them; see Plafond à la française in French Wikipedia).

It has been listed since 1914 as a monument historique by the French Ministry of Culture. The castle is privately owned and is open to the public from June to September. Visitors may see frescoes from the 17th century, furnished rooms, weapons and portraits, and the Mansart Museum.

== Gallery ==
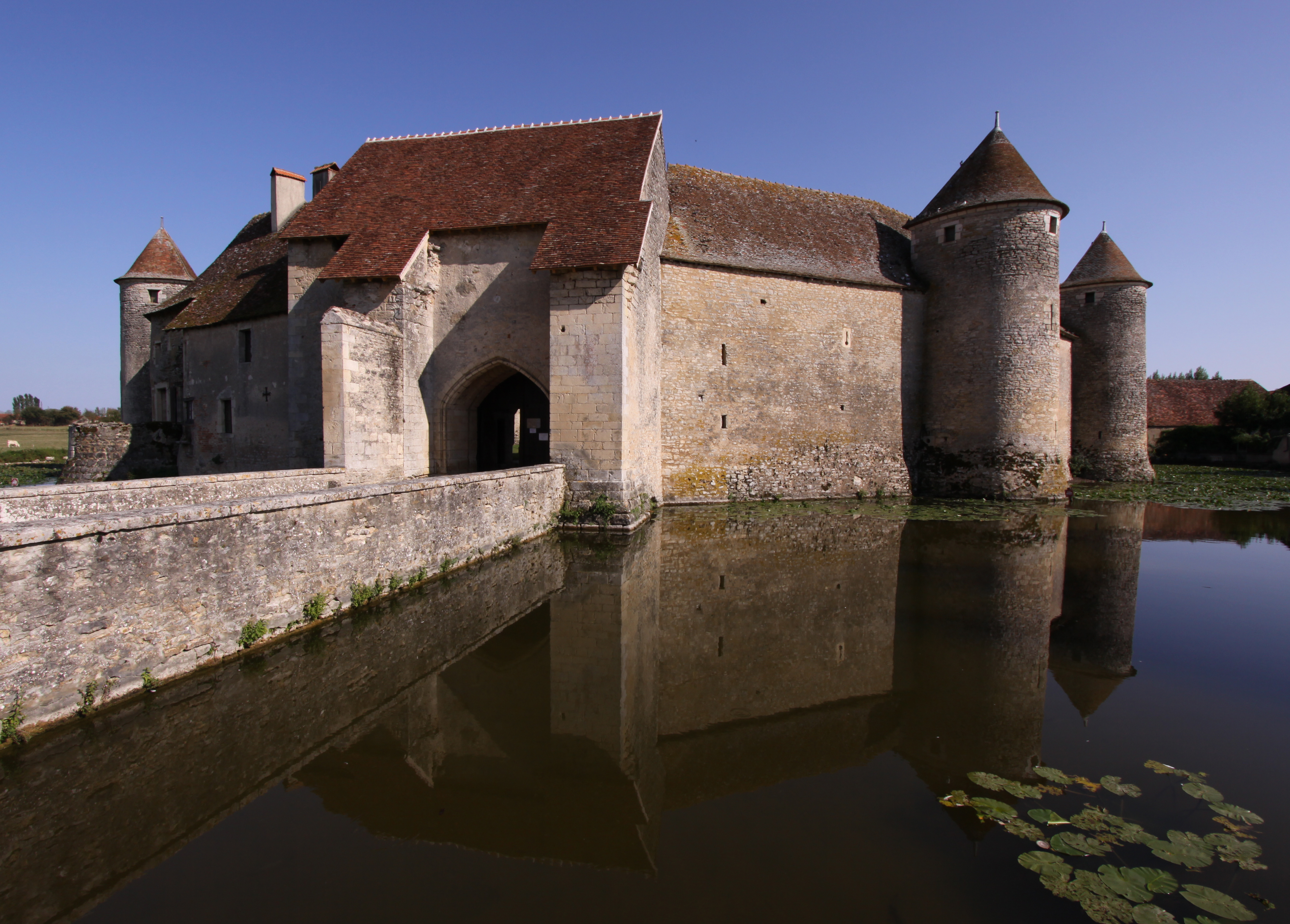

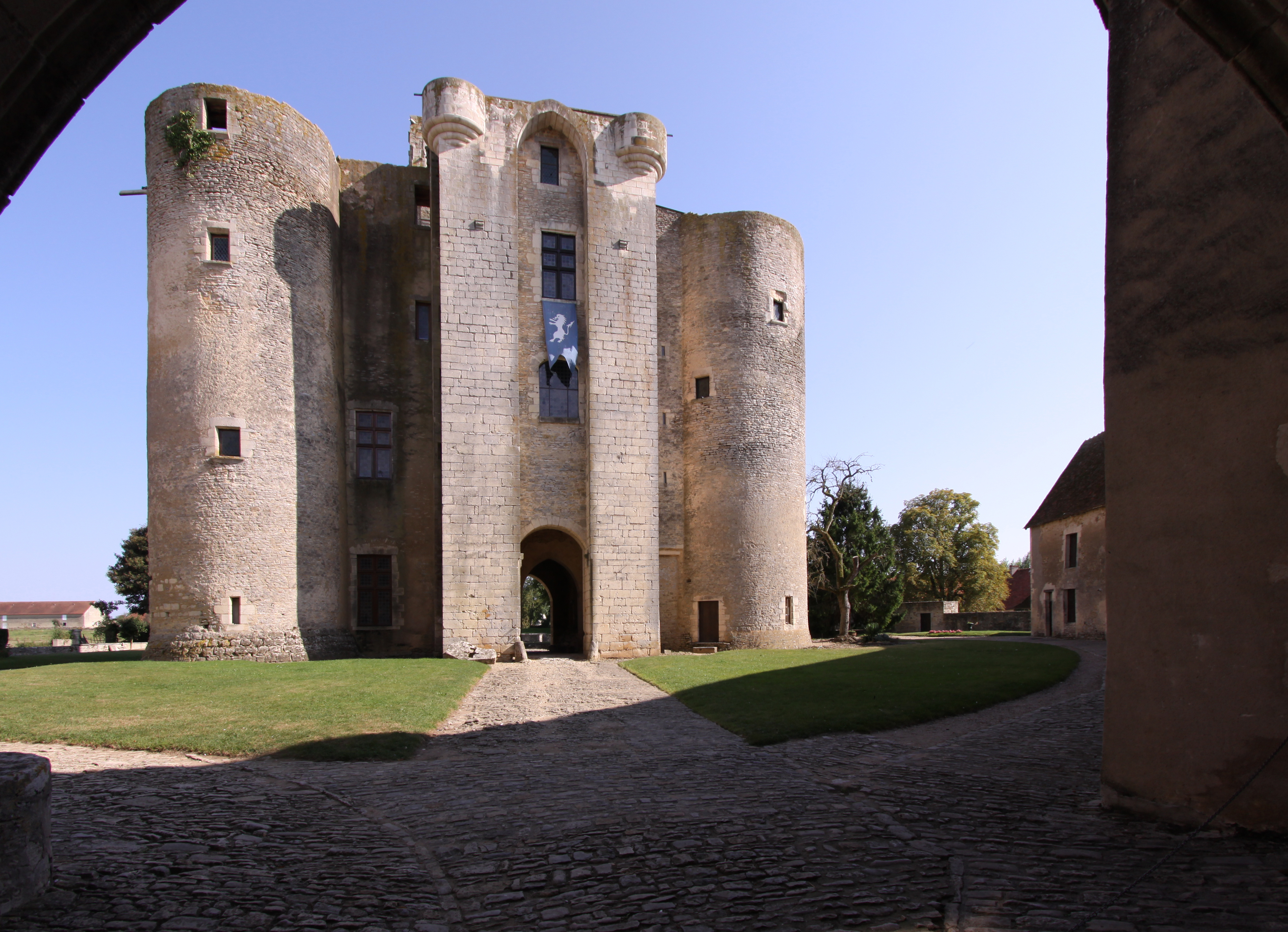

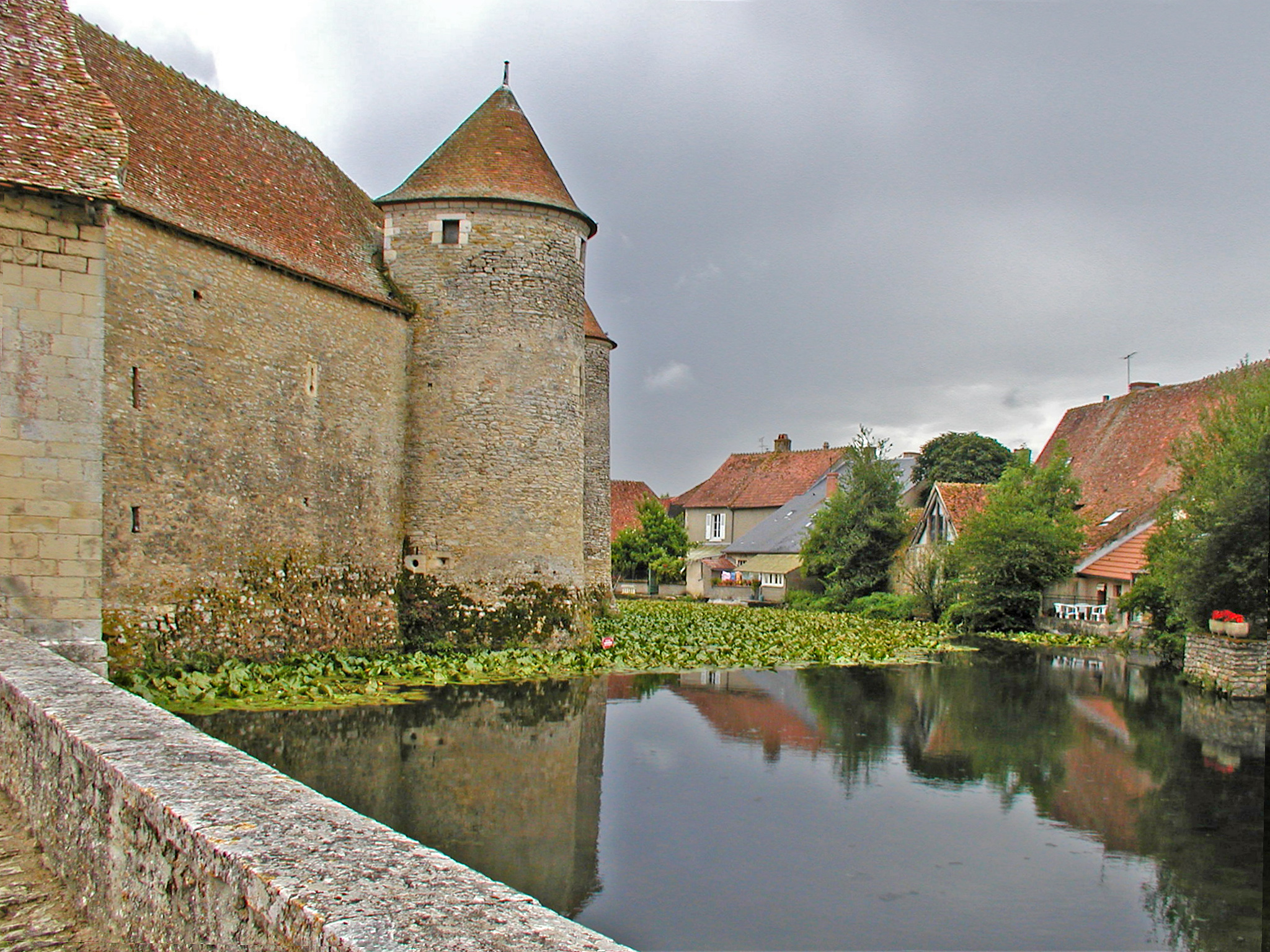

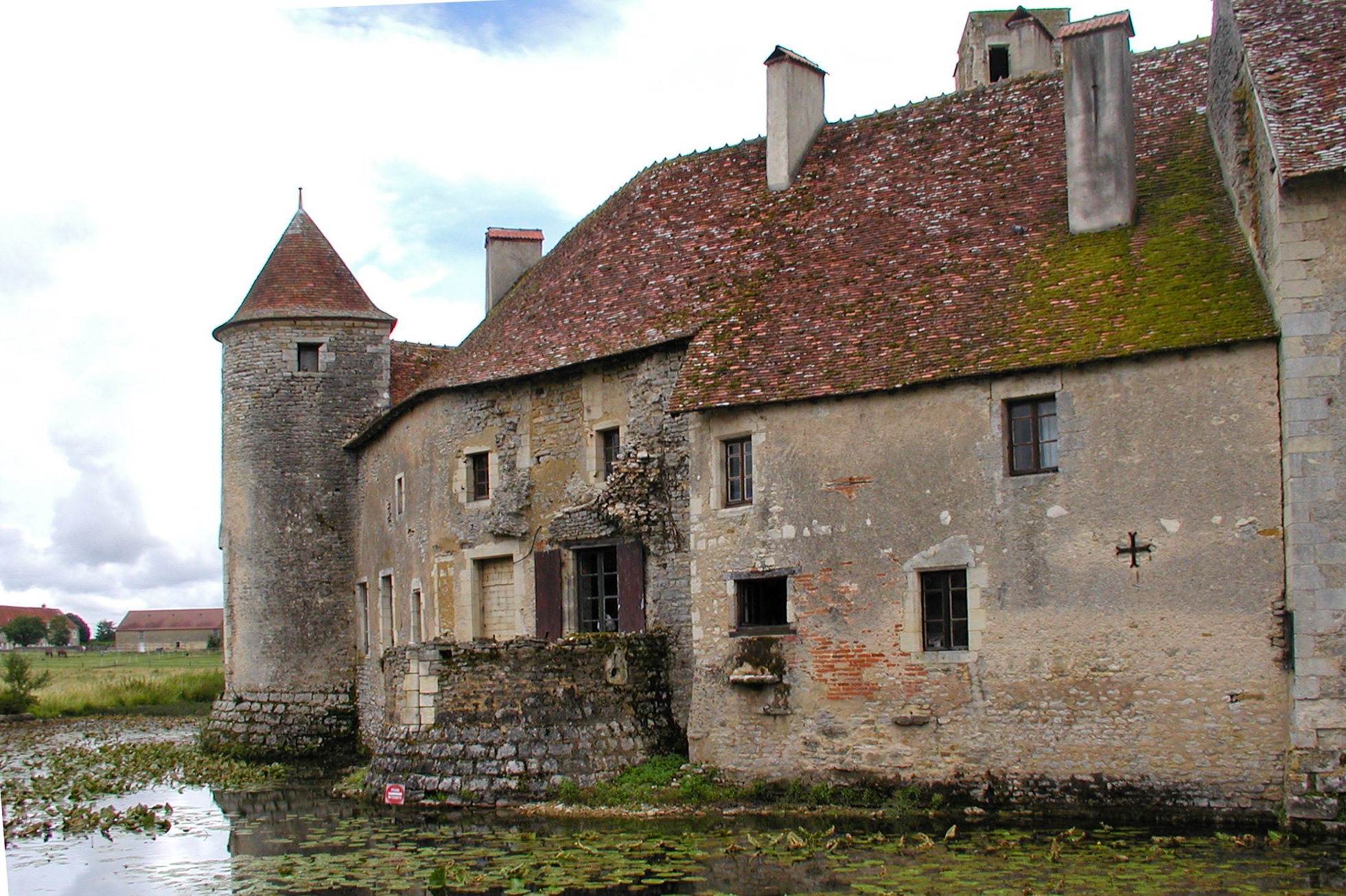

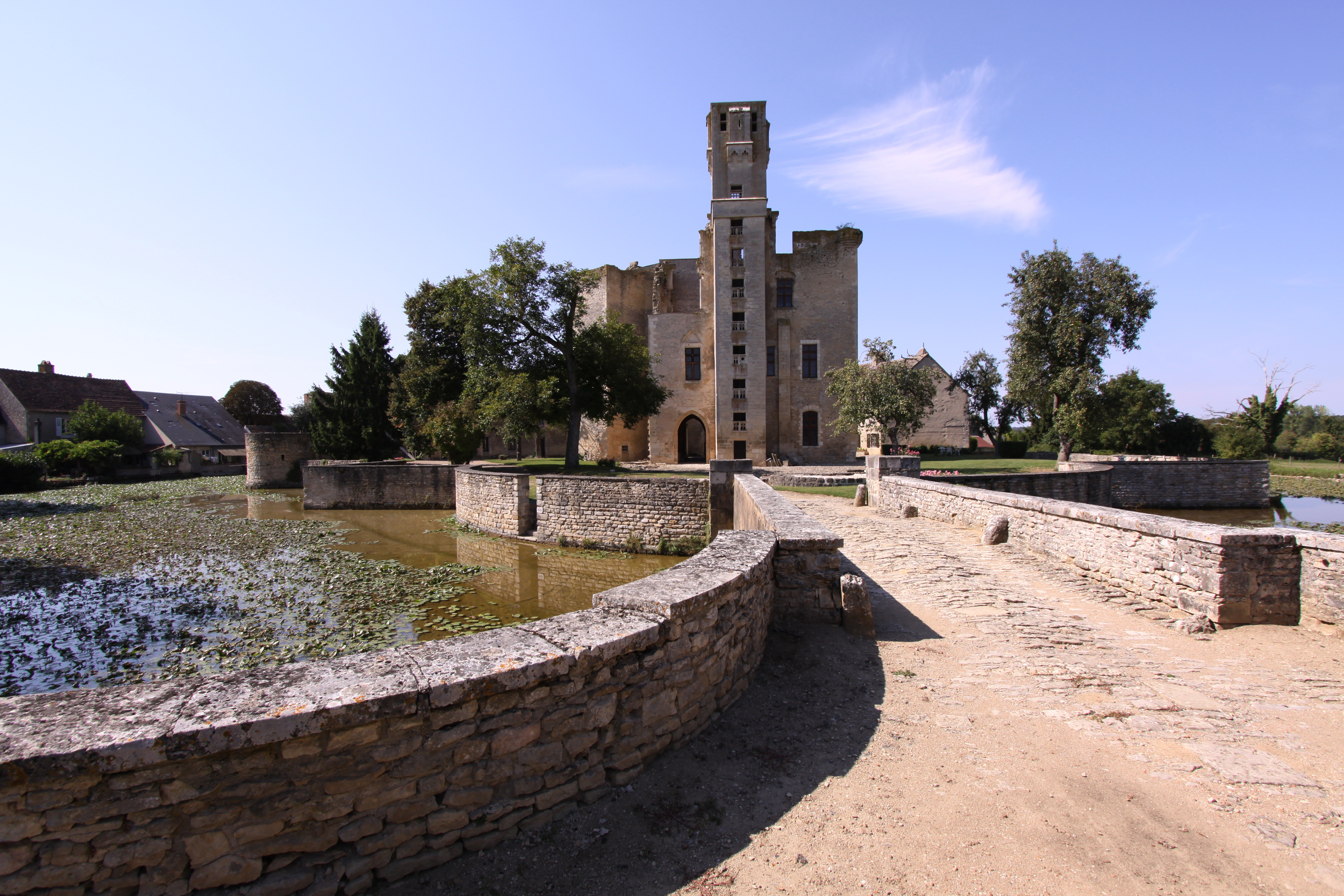

== See also ==
- List of castles in France
