= Sacred Relic of Saint George =

Christian relic

The sacred relic of Saint George was one of the most famous of relics, after the True Cross and Holy Lance, and was the arm of the Saint George (d. 303), reputedly ordered killed by the Roman Emperor Diocletian for his failure to renounce his faith in Christ. George, a secondary patron saint of the First Crusade, played a significant role and provided other relics. On November 3/16, the Orthodox Church commemorates the translation of his relics from Rome to Lydda, his mother’s hometown.

== Legend ==
According to legend, Gerbault, a priest from Lille, and a companion, who traveled with the army of Robert's in northern Syria, while foraging for food, came upon a monastery, where, according to custom, they were well received and fed. Gerbault, apparently forgetting his vows and the kind nature of his hosts, had his eyes on relics that might be had. The host monks, described as “good-natured and simple-minded,” showed him a locked marble chest where they kept their most prized possessions, the arm, shoulders and ribs of St. George. Gerbault and his companion, managed to get the key to the chest and steal the arm.

As the story goes, as Gerbault fled from the monastery with his ill-gotten gains, he was struck by blindness and returned to the scene of his crime to confess his sin. The monks, in their piety, forgave him and his sight returned. They then gave him the arm as a present. He returned to Robert's contingent, but soon fell ill and died. The arm then passed to a knight in Robert's service, Gerard of Buc, second Castellan of Lille, who also died, followed by Gunscelin, a canon of Lille. Robert finally intervened and demanded that the relic be given to him, with Gerard's other possessions. A series of custodians of the arm also fell ill until one of Robert's chaplains took custody of it. The arm was nearly lost in a shipwreck as Robert returned home.

An alternate account says the relic was a gift to Robert from the Byzantine emperor Alexios I Komnenos. The arm was given to the abbey of Anchin by Robert of Jerusalem (Robert II of Flanders).

A phalange bone from one of the saint’s hands is held by Saint George Greek Orthodox Cathedral in Hartford, Connecticut.

According to historian Kenneth Setton, a purported portion of the saint's skull is held at the San Giorgio Monastery in Venice.

== Sources ==
- Riley-Smith, Jonathan, The First Crusaders, 1095-1131, Cambridge University Press, London, 1997
- Riley-Smith, Jonathan, The First Crusade and the Idea of Crusading, A&C Black, London, 2003
- Bautier, R. H. and Gilles, M. (editors), Chronique de Saint-Pierre-le-Vif de Sens, Paris, 1979, pgs 184-188
- Lambert of Ardres, Historia comitum Ghisnensium, 1194–98.
