= Jean Baffier =

French sculptor

Jean Baffier (born in Neuvy-le-Barrois, Cher, on 18 November 1851, and died in Paris on 19 April 1920), was a French sculptor.

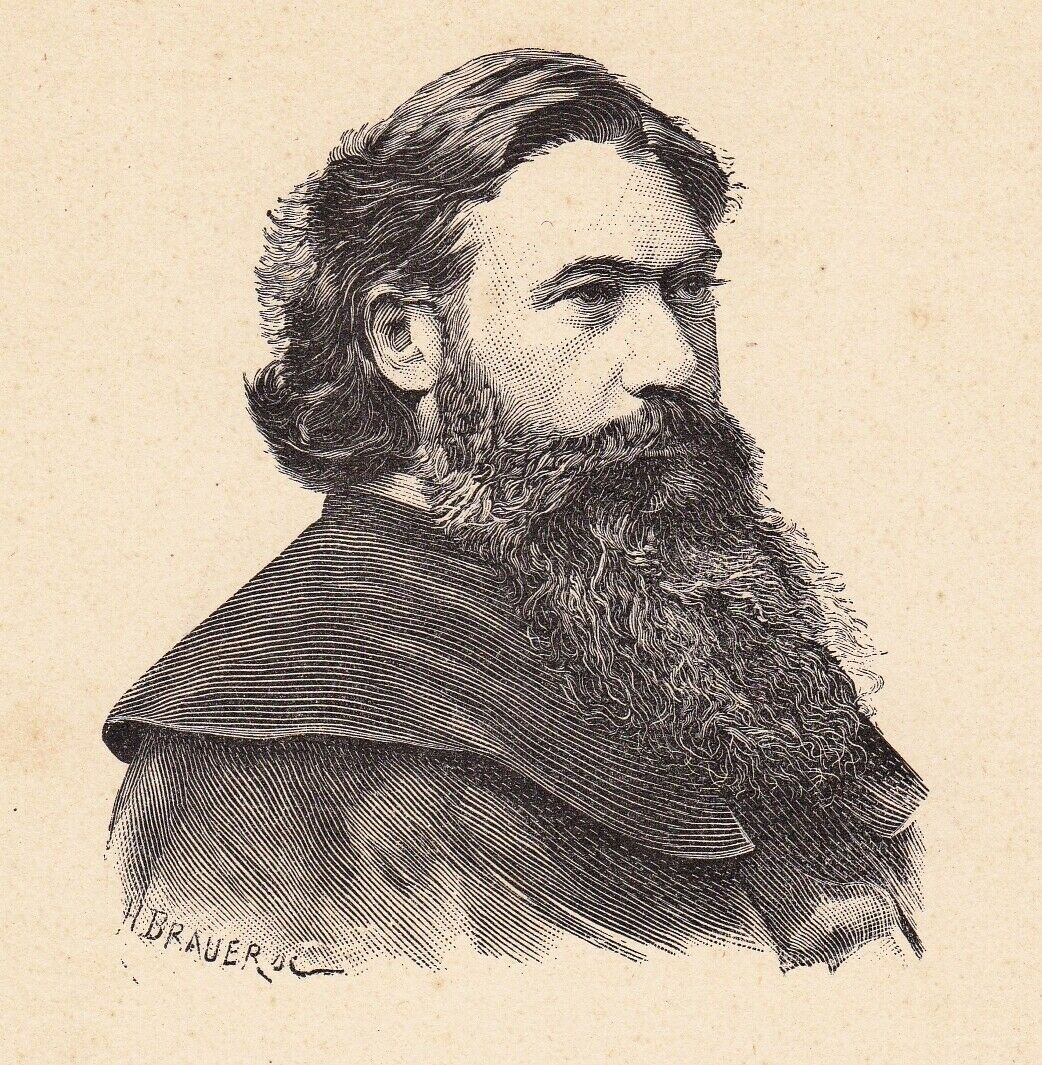
Jean Baffier

== Biography ==
He became known for his bronze figurines (Le Vigneron, Le Faucheur, Le Vielleux) and his tin objects (vases, candlesticks, dinnerware) decorated with plant motifs. He also made statues and busts of historical figures (Louis XI, Jean-Paul Marat, Jean-Jacques Rousseau).

A strong regionalist, he became interested in the traditional music and folk tales of his native province of Berry. In 1886, he founded Le Réveil de la Gaule, a magazine that he edited until 1912. He was also the author of a collection of Berrichon stories, entitled Nos géants d'auterfoés.

== Main works ==
=== Statues ===
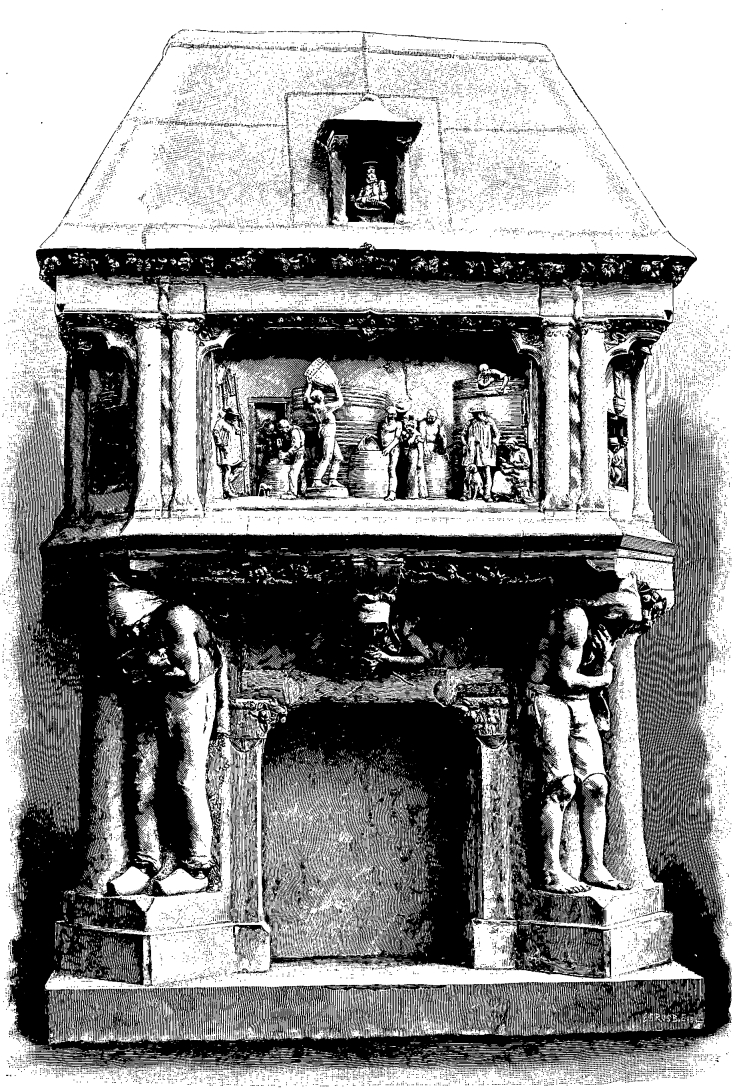
Le Vin
Ornamental fireplace first shown at the Salon in 1898. Engraving published in Le Magasin pittoresque, 15 June 1898.

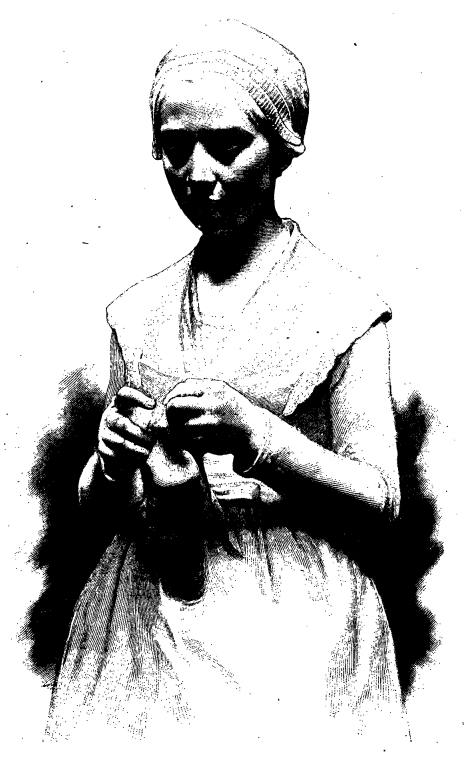
La Jeannette
Musée Galliera, Paris. Engraving published in Le Magasin pittoresque, 1 June 1901.

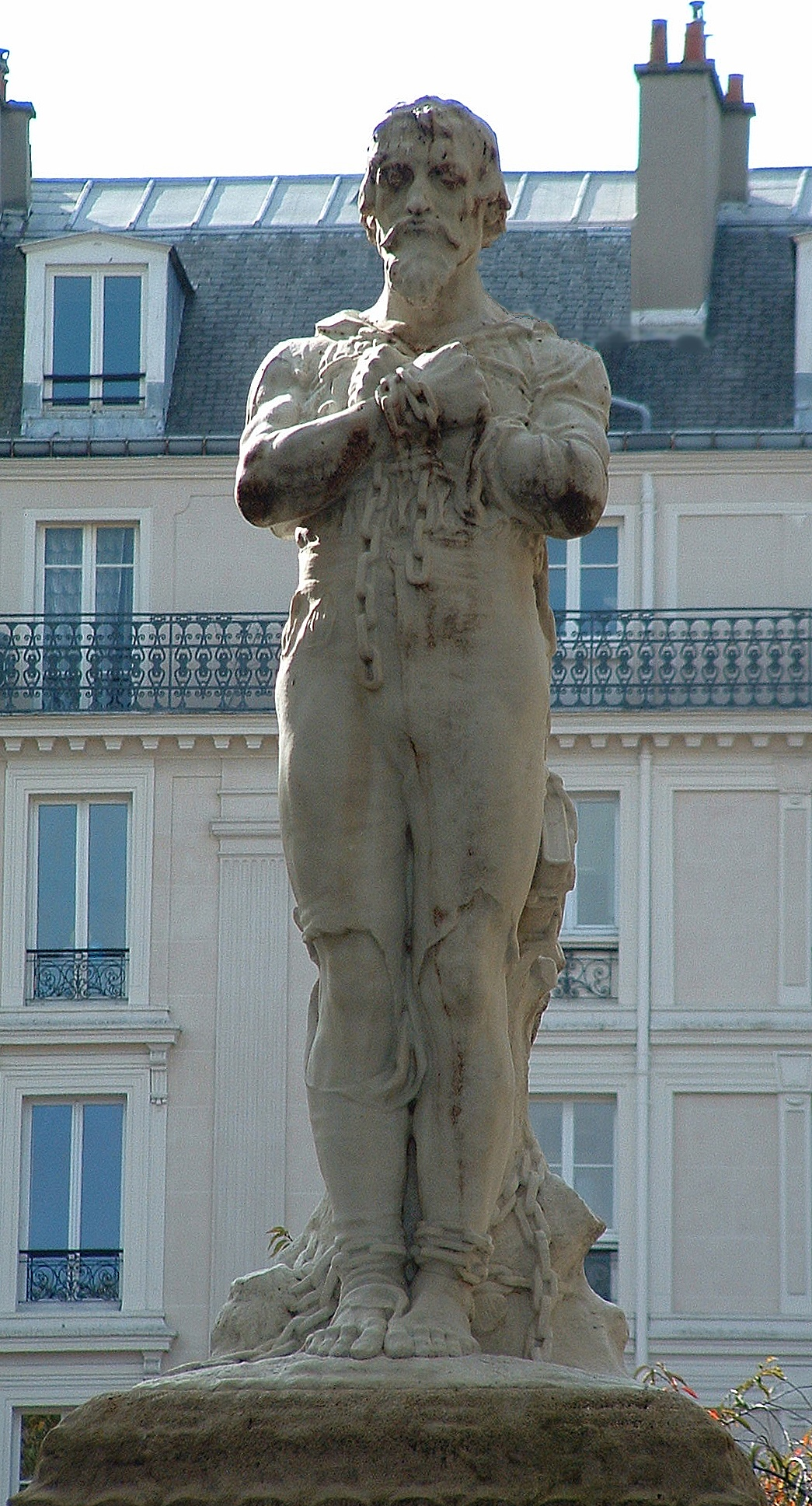
Statue of Michel Servet in Aspirand Durand Square, Paris.

=== Publications ===
- Le Réveil de la Gaule, ou la Justice de Jacques Bonhomme, Paris, 1886
- Les Marges d'un carnet d'ouvrier : objections sur la médaille à M. Zola offerte à propos de l'affaire Dreyfus, Paris, 1898
- Causeries esthétiques d'un ouvrier sculpteur français. La Cathédrale de France, ses destructeurs, ses détracteurs, pourquoi on a voulu la détruire, pourquoi on l'a calomniée, Paris, 1900
- Nos géants d'auterfoés. Récits berrichons recueillis par Jean Baffier, revue of the sixteenth century, Société des études rabelaisiennes, Champion, Paris, 1913. Reedited by Champion, Paris, 1920

== Bibliography ==
- Neil McWilliam, Monumental Intolerance. Jean Baffier, A Nationalist Sculptor in Nineteenth-Century France, Penn State University Press, 2000
