= Guillelmum de Canaberiis =

13th-century Medieval knight

- Knight
- Born: 13th century Paris, France
- Died: 13th century France

Guillelmum de Canaberiis was a Medieval Knight, Sheriff or Alguacil of Bourges. He served in the court of Louis IX of France.

Born in France, Canaberiis was sheriff of Paris from 1258 to 1262, and was appointed sheriff of Berry in 1263. He also served as "miles regis" (soldier of king) between 1265–1266.
