= Baldwin Chauderon =

Baldwin Chauderon (died 1097) was a knight from Berry who was killed during the siege of Nicaea. It is unclear whether or not he belonged to any of the major armies of the First Crusade.

Baldwin was described by William of Tyre as “a rich man and a good knight” and is associated in William's work with Baldwin de Ghent (presumably Baldwin II, Lord of Aalst, part of the army of Robert II of Flanders), and Guy de Possesse of Champagne. All three died on the same day, with the two Baldwins dying of an unknown illness and Guy dying from a stone that the Turks had catapulted onto his head. (Note that other sources say Baldwin de Ghent died when shot by an arrow.)

Their bodies were carried to a church dedicated to St. Simeon by men from Flanders and Burgundy who held a vigil, lighting 30 candles until the sermon the next day. They were buried in a nearby churchyard. The three knights were immortalized in the poem La Chanson d’Antioche.

== Sources ==
- Handyside, Philip D., The Old French William of Tyre (a Translation of William of Tyre's History of the Crusades and the Kingdom of Jerusalem, 1095-1184, Brill, Leiden, Netherlands, 2015
- Sumberg, Lewis A. M., La chanson d'Antioche, Picard, Paris, 1968
- Riley-Smith, Jonathan, The First Crusaders, 1095-1131, Cambridge University Press, London, 1997
- Runciman, Steven, A History of the Crusades, Volume One: The First Crusade and the Foundation of the Kingdom of Jerusalem, Cambridge University Press, London, 1951
- Prof. J. S. C. Riley-Smith, Prof, Jonathan Phillips, Dr. Alan V. Murray, Dr. Guy Perry, Dr. Nicholas Morton, A Database of Crusaders to the Holy Land, 1099-1149 (available on-line)
