= Communauté de communes Les Trois Provinces =

Federation of municipalities in France

Les Trois Provinces
- Communauté de communes
- Country: France
- Region: Centre-Val de Loire
- Department: Cher
- No. of communes: {{{nbcomm}}}
- Established: 2001

Government
  - President: Paul Bernard
- Area: 269.56 km^{2} (104.08 sq mi)
- Population (2018): 5,146
  - Density: 19.09/km^{2} (49.44/sq mi)

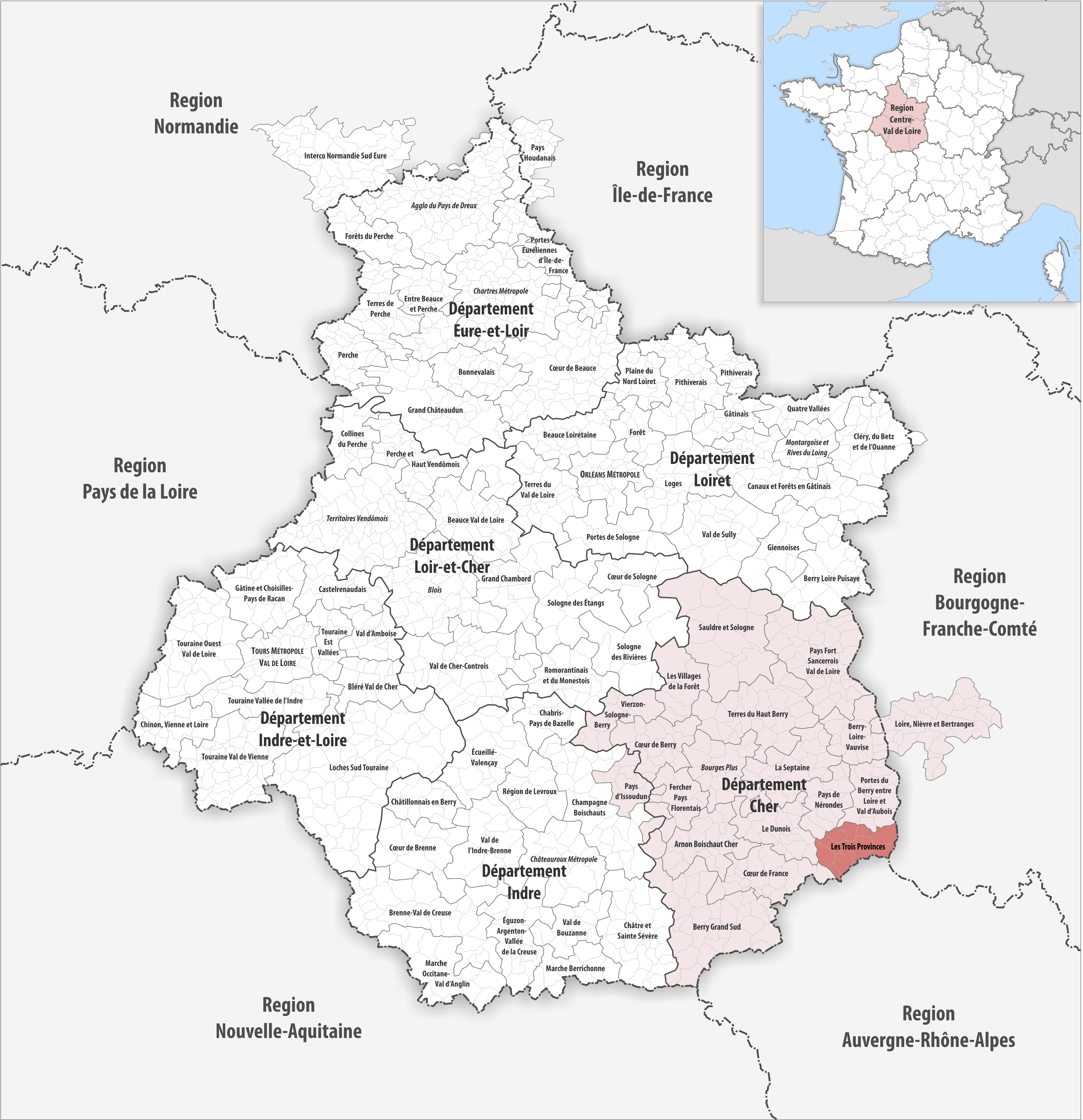
Map of Communauté de communes Les Trois Provinces

The communauté de communes Les Trois Provinces is located in the Cher département of the Centre-Val de Loire region of France. It was established on 26 December 2000, effective from 1 January 2001, and its seat is in Sancoins. Its area is 269.6 km^{2}, and its population was 5,146 in 2018.

== Composition ==
The communauté de communes consists of the following 11 communes:

1. Augy-sur-Aubois
2. Chaumont
3. Givardon
4. Grossouvre
5. Mornay-sur-Allier
6. Neuilly-en-Dun
7. Neuvy-le-Barrois
8. Sagonne
9. Saint-Aignan-des-Noyers
10. Sancoins
11. Vereaux
