= Lambert of Arras =

Early 12th century Flemish bishop

- Bishop of Arras
- Diocese: Arras
- Elected: July 10, 1093
- Term ended: May 16, 1115
- Successor: Robert I
- Other post: Archdeacon of Thérouanne (1075-1093)

Personal details
- Born: Guînes, Flanders
- Died: May 16, 1115 Arras, Flanders

Lambert of Guînes (died 16 May 1115) was the bishop of Arras (1094–1115). He was a major regional player and an active proponent of the Cluniac reform movement.

== Biography ==
=== Early life ===
Lambert was born around the middle of the eleventh century in Guînes, possibly belonging to the family of the counts of Guînes. He began his clerical career possibly in 1068 when he entered the collegiate church of St Quentin in Beauvais. Here, Lambert became a student of canon law, disciple of Ivo of Chartres and a staunch supporter of the ecclesiastic reform movement. Around 1075, Lambert became archdeacon of Thérouanne and entered the collegiate church of Saint-Pierre in Lille.

On 10 July 1093, he was chosen as bishop by the clergy of Arras and Saint-Pierre of Lille and he was consecrated by pope Urban II in March 1094. Arras had previously been part of the diocese of Cambrai but count Robert II of Flanders had instigated the founding of the bishopric to weaken the influence of the emperor in the region.

=== Bishop ===
After Lamberts election, he summoned many wise men to him to aid him in his task, among them John of Warneton, a regular canon at Mont Saint-Éloi Abbey and another former pupil of Ivo of Chartres, who later became bishop of Thérouanne. Lambert maintained friendships with his former teacher Ivo as well as with Archbishop Anselm of Canterbury who both esteemed him highly and lent him their political and moral support. When pope Urban II convened the council of Clermont in 1095, Lambert attended and returned with a copy of its canons.

During the four-year absence of most of the Flamish nobles, Lambert and countess Clemence were able to keep law and order in the county. Together with Clemence, Lambert officiated at the priory of Watten at the enshrinement of the relics of the Virgin, St Matthew and St Nicholas that Clemence' husband, Robert II, had received from his sister and her husband Duke Roger of Apulia. In April 1099, Lambert was in Rome to attend a synod. This council, which took place between 24 and 30 April, dealt according to Lambert with reforming measures for both the Latin and the Greek Church.

Lambert of Arras died on 16 May 1115.

== Legacy ==
Lambert collaborated closely with his fellow bishops John of Thérouanne, Godfrey of Amiens, Manasses I of Reims and Odo of Tournai, something even recognised by pope Paschal II who relied on them to resolve some of the regions most protracted legal disputes. Along with them, but also count Robert II and Clemence, he promoted Cluniac reforms throughout Flanders. The many petitions Lambert received from bishops, clergy and laypeople in the region show that he both acted and was perceived as highly influential person.

In his time as bishop, Lambert had 23 acta issued in his name and gathered a corpus of 128 letters, 41 of which he had sent and 73 of which he received (14 letters were neither sent by nor addressed to him). Many of these are included in the Liber Lamberti, a record book which contains apart from letters also decrees and privileges concerning Lambert's tasks as a bishop. Included is also a letter from pope Urban to Flanders that, though original, was rewritten at some time after its original issue.

Lambert of Arras was also connected to the legend of the Holy Candle of Arras, in which a Marian apparition gave the local people in 1105 a miraculous candle which healed people from ergot poisoning. The story was recorded by Lambert's successor and a church named Notre-Dame-des-Ardents built.

== Sources ==
- Bedos-Rezak, Brigitte (26 November 2010). When Ego Was Imago: Signs of Identity in the Middle Ages. BRILL. ISBN 978-90-04-19217-1.
- Colin-Simard, Annette (1981). Les apparitions de la Vierge : leur histoire. [Paris] : Fayard : Mame. ISBN 978-2-213-01003-8.
- Kerý, Lotte (1994). "Die Errichtung des Bistums Arras 1093/94" (PDF). Beihefte der Francia. 33. Jan Thorbecke Verlag Sigmaringen.
- Ott, John S. (1 December 2015). Bishops, Authority and Community in Northwestern Europe, c.1050–1150. Cambridge University Press. ISBN 978-1-316-36824-4.
- Smith, Thomas W. (16 April 2024). Rewriting the First Crusade: Epistolary Culture in the Middle Ages. Boydell & Brewer. ISBN 978-1-83765-175-7.
- Somerville, Robert (27 October 2011). Pope Urban II's Council of Piacenza. OUP Oxford. ISBN 978-0-19-925859-8.
- Vanderputten, Steven (2013). Reform, Conflict, and the Shaping of Corporate Identities: Collected Studies on Benedictine Monasticism, 1050 - 1150. LIT Verlag Münster. ISBN 978-3-643-90429-4.
