= Baldwin VII of Flanders =

Count of Flanders from 1111 to 1119

Baldwin VII
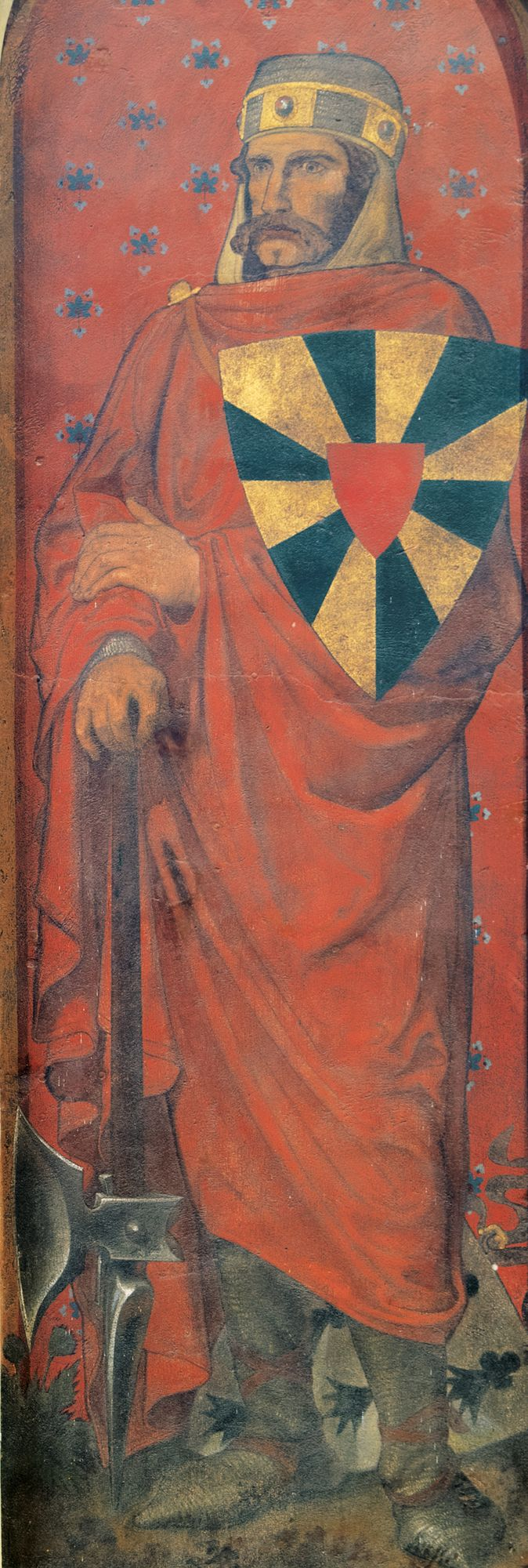
- Depiction of Baldwin II in the Gravenkapel by Julien Van der Plaetsen, c. 1372-1373

Count of Flanders
- Reign: 1111 – 17 June 1119
- Predecessor: Robert II
- Successor: Charles the Good
- Died: 17 June 1119
- Spouse: Hawise of Brittany
- House: House of Flanders
- Father: Robert II of Flanders
- Mother: Clementia of Burgundy

Baldwin VII (1093 – 17 July 1119) was Count of Flanders from 1111 to 1119.

Baldwin was the son of Count Robert II of Flanders and Clementia of Burgundy. He succeeded his father as count when he died on 5 October 1111.

== Reign ==
Baldwin succeeded his father as count when he died on 5 October 1111. He was under the influence of his powerful mother Clementia of Burgundy. He tried to assert independence from her, but she still remained influential behind the scenes. Baldwin was an impetuous and impulsive young man, extremely hostile towards Henry I of England. The inexperienced new count solicited the advice of his cousin, Charles the Good, who was several years older. It was Baldwin who arranged the marriage of Charles to the heiress of the County of Amiens, Margaret of Clermont, in 1118. Baldwin invaded Normandy in 1118 and raided many towns.

In 1105, Baldwin married Hawise of Brittany (also called Havide), daughter of Duke Alan IV of Brittany. The groom was twelve and the bride nine. The union, in all probability, was never consummated. They were divorced in 1110. Baldwin did not remarry. Baldwin and Hawise had no known issue.

== Death ==
He died after being wounded in 1118, hit on the head by a lance at the Battle of Bures-en-Bray, where he was fighting Henry I of England, on behalf of Louis VI of France. When he was dying in 1119 at Eu, Baldwin declared his cousin Charles his heir. he died on 17 June 1119. Charles became the new count of Flanders after his death.

19th century depiction of Baldwin by Albrecht De Vriendt

Preceded by Robert II	Count of Flanders; 1111–1119	Succeeded by Charles I
