= Army of Robert II of Flanders on the First Crusade =

Robert II of Flanders' army was formed shortly after that of his kinsman Godfrey of Bouillon, arriving in Constantinople considerably later. His wife Clementia of Burgundy was regent of Flanders in his absence. The known members of the army, mostly Flemish, included the ones listed below, as reported in histories of the First Crusade. Unless otherwise noted, references are to the on-line database of Riley-Smith, et al., and the hyperlinks therein provide details including original sources. The names below are also referenced in the Riley-Smith tome, Appendix I: Preliminary List of Crusaders. Those references are not shown unless they appear elsewhere in the text of the book. Articles that are hyperlinked to a more detailed article in this encyclopædia rely on the latter for references.

== Household of Robert ==
Among those from Robert’s household included the following:

- Engelbert of Cysoing and Lord of Petegem, Standard-bearer for Robert, and his nephews Arnold II of Ardres and Baldwin of Ghent
- Eustace, butler of Robert
- Gontier of Aire, squire of Robert
- Onulf, seneschal of Robert
- Winrich of Flanders, who originally travelled with Robert as his butler but became the butler of Godfrey of Bouillon in 1100. He was also known as the Butler of Jerusalem.

== Clergy ==
As is true with all the armies, a large number of clergy accompanied the army, including:

- Cono, chaplain of Robert
- Ranier, chaplain of Robert
- Sannardus, priest and chaplain of Robert
- Gerbault of Lille, priest. He attempted to steal the arm of St. George from a Syrian Monastery and was struck with blindness for his action (see below).
- Guunscelin, canon of Lille, who also succumbed to the curse of the arm
- Roger, chaplin to Anselm II.

== Knights and other combatants ==
The known combatants in the army were:

- Anselm II of Ribemont, Lord of Ostrevant and Valenciennes, Castellan of Bouchain
- Baldwin II, Lord of Aalst, advocate of the abbey of St. Peter at Ghent, father of Baldwin III, Count of Aalst. He was killed by an arrow at the siege of Nicaea.
- Ralph of Aalst, advocate of St. Peter’s Abbey at Ghent. He was related to the counts of Flanders. He died at the second battle of Ramila in 1102.
- Gilbert of Aalst, cousin of both Baldwin and Ralph of Aalst. He founded the nunnery of Merhem for his sister Lietgard “so he could find a better inheritance in the heavenly Jerusalem.”
- Engelbert of Tournai, famous for his role in the final assault on Jerusalem in 1099
- Ludolf of Tournai, brother of Engelbert of Tournai. He was among the first Crusaders to mount the walls of Jerusalem.
- Gerard of Buc, second Castellan of Lille. Gerard became the custodian of the arm of St. George and, like the priest Gerbault, died with it in his custody.
- Gerbod III, Lord of Scheldewindeke and advocate of the abbey of Sint-Bertin at Ghent. He was killed at the battle of Ramla in 1102, beheaded and had his head displayed on a spike in Jaffa. His father is believed to be Gerbod the Fleming, 1st Earl of Chester.
- Hugh of St. Omer, Lord of Fauquembergues and later Lord of Tiberias after 1101. He was killed in a battle with the Turks of Damascus.
- Lisiard of Flanders
- Roger, first Castellan of Lille
- Saswalo of Phalempin
- Walo of Lille.

== The battles of the army of Robert II ==
The many battles that Robert and his army participated in are documented in the article Robert II, Count of Flanders.

== Sources ==
- Riley-Smith, Jonathan, The First Crusaders, 1095-1131, Cambridge University Press, London, 1997
- Runciman, Steven, A History of the Crusades, Volume One: The First Crusade and the Foundation of the Kingdom of Jerusalem, Cambridge University Press, London, 1951
- Bury, J. B., Editor, The Cambridge Medieval History, Volume III: Germany and the Western Empire, Cambridge University Press, London, 1922
- Prof. J. S. C. Riley-Smith, Prof, Jonathan Phillips, Dr. Alan V. Murray, Dr. Guy Perry, Dr. Nicholas Morton, A Database of Crusaders to the Holy Land, 1099-1149 (available on-line)
- Galbert of Bruges, The Murder, Betrayal, and Slaughter of the Glorious Charles, Count of Flanders, originally published before 1134, translated by Jeff Rider, Yale University Press, New Haven, 2013
- Riley-Smith, Jonathan, The First Crusade and the Idea of Crusading, A&C Black, London, 2003.
