= Ivo of Chartres =

French abbot and bishop of Chartres (c.1040–1115)

Saint Ivo of Chartres, C.R.S.A.
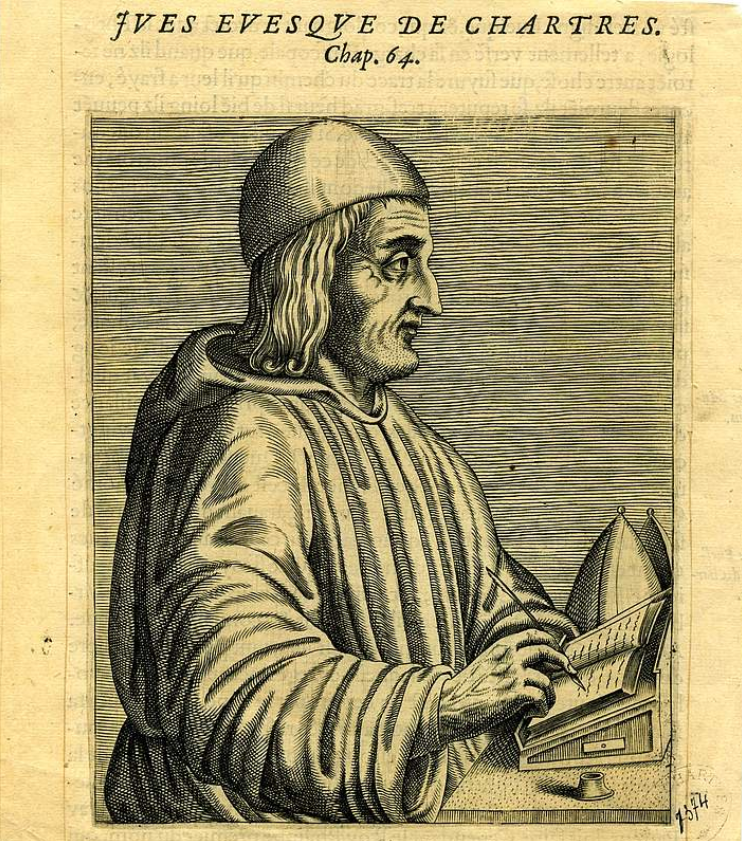
- St. Yvo of Chartres by André Thevet (1584), Fine Arts Museum of Chartres, Eure-et-Loir, France

Bishop and Confessor
- Born: ca. 1040; Chartres, Kingdom of France
- Died: 23 December 1115; Chartres, Kingdom of France
- Venerated in: Roman Catholic Church (France)
- Feast: 23 December

Ivo of Chartres, Can.Reg. (also Ives, Yves, or Yvo; Latin: Ivo Carnutensis; c. 1040 – 23 December 1115), was a French canon regular and abbot who then served as the Bishop of Chartres from 1090 until his death. He was an important authority in Catholic canon law during the Investiture Crisis of that era. He is honored as a saint in the Catholic Church.

Three extensive canonical works, namely Tripartita, Decretum, and Panormia, are attributed to him. He corresponded extensively. His liturgical feast is observed on 23 December.

== Life ==
=== Early life ===
Ivo was born in or near Chartres circa 1040 to a family of relatively low social status. He is claimed to have studied first in Paris, then at the Abbey of Bec in Normandy, where, according to Robert of Torigni, he studied under Lanfranc along with Anselm of Canterbury.

Not much is known of Ivo until some time after he was admitted to the clergy. His first benefice was at Nesle in Picardy. In 1067 his bishop, Gui of Beauvais, asked him to become the provost (termed abbot) of the Collegiate Church of Saint-Quentin. Under his leadership and program of reform, the community of secular canons established there accepted religious life under the Rule of St. Augustine, thereby becoming canons regular. As superior, he was skeptical of religious excess and always stressed moderation in practice.

Ivo remained at the abbey for twenty years and established himself as one of the best teachers in France. His abbey came to be known as a great school of theology. Lambert of Guines and John of Warneton both studied canon law under Ivo.

=== Bishop ===
In 1090 Ivo's knowledge of canon law, both as a lawyer and cleric, most probably earned him the office of Bishop of Chartres. His predecessor, Geoffrey, had been removed from office by Pope Urban II. Geoffrey's relatives and supporters initially opposed Ivo's appointment, but with the backing of Pope Urban II, King Philip, and the influential Countess Adela of Blois, Ivo was eventually grudgingly accepted. In light of the events preceding his appointment to the office, his strong opposition to the practice of simony may have been the impetus to his episcopal elevation.

During his twenty-five year episcopacy at Chartres, Ivo was involved in conflicts with many magnates including King Philip I of France, Archbishop Richer of Sens, the papal legate Hugh of Die, and several local nobles. The most famous case concerned the marriage of King Philip, who in the early 1090s tried to repudiate his wife Bertha of Holland in order to marry Bertrade of Anjou. Local baron Hugh Le Puiset took advantage of the situation to seize episcopal lands and imprison the bishop for a short time.

Ivo was an acquaintance of Countess Adele of Normandy, who helped him reform the Abbey of St. Jean-en-Vallée. In addition, on several occasions he defended her decisions, most notably during the events regarding Rotrou III of Perche, when he refused to assert ecclesiastical sanctions against him.

Around 1114, Ivo granted to Bernard of Abbeville land in Thiron-Gardais, where Bernard established the monastery that would become the Abbey of the Holy Trinity of Tiron.

During his episcopacy Ivo wrote the majority of his extant works, for which he later became famous and considered among the greatest scholars of the mediaeval era.

== Works ==
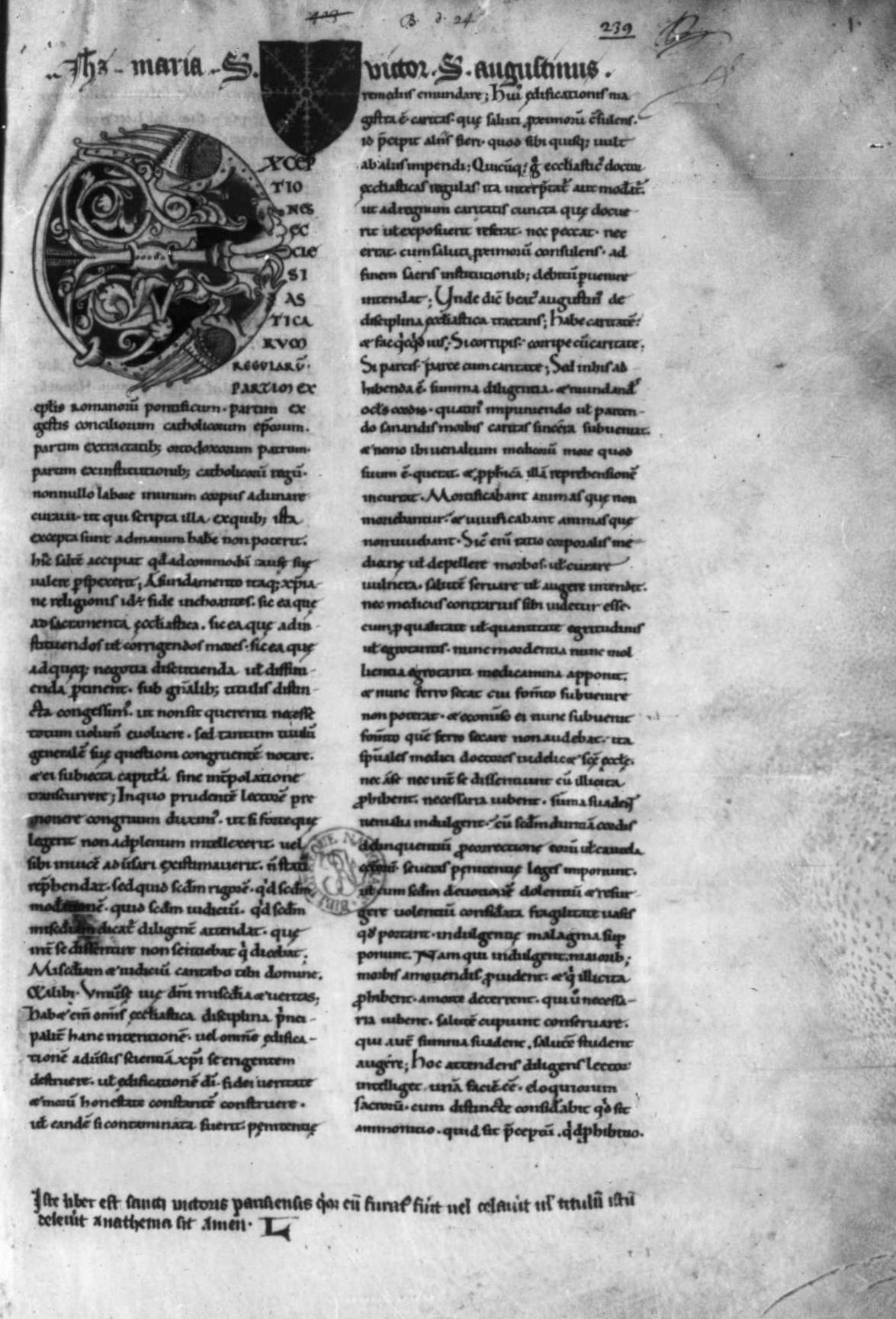
Decretum, 12th-century manuscript. Paris, Bibliothèque Nationale de France, lat. 14315.

Ivo was a prolific writer but is most known for his canonical works: the Decretum of seventeen books; the Tripartita, of very substantial material, divided in three parts, and attributed to him; and the Panormia of eight books attributed to him. All three are primarily works of canon law. The Prologue to the Decretum deals with the interpretation of canon law, and specifically argues that caritas was the solution for sin, and not harsh punishment without contrition. "He was called to teach. His lesson was love. It was all that mattered."

Ivo is also famous for his 288 letters of correspondence. These letters often dealt with liturgical, canonical, and dogmatic questions and, much like his major works, are from the perspective of caritas. Several of his extant sermons, totaling 25, treat of the same topics as his other writings and letters.

It has also been suggested that his doctrines influenced the final agreement of the Concordat of Worms in 1122.

== Subsequent influence and veneration ==
Ivo's writings had considerable influence in the twelfth century and beyond. Many of his letters and sermons circulated already in his lifetime, and were copied widely especially in the mid-twelfth century. The same is true for the canonical collections attributed to him; they were copied frequently and used in the making of other collections. For example, Gratian’s Concordia Discordantium Canonum (commonly denominated Decretum Gratiani) draws on both the Tripartita and the Panormia. Alger of Liège was strongly influenced by Ivo's Prologus and quoted from his Decretum. Peter Abelard in his Sic et Non used the Prologue, too, and apparently quoted both from Ivo's Decretum and from the Panormia.

Although it is not known when he was canonized, 23 December is his present liturgical memorial. Before 1570 it was observed on 20 May.

The parish of Maintenon is under his patronage as the French: Paroisse de Saint-Yves des Trois Vallées.

== Sources ==
- On-going critical edition of his works (and the collections attributed to him):
- Edition of the Prologue: Brasington, Bruce Clark (2004). Ways of Mercy: The Prologue of Ivo of Chartres: Edition and Analysis. LIT Verlag Münster. ISBN 3825873862.
- English translation of the Prologue: Somerville, Robert; Brasington, Bruce Clark (2020). Prefaces to Canon Law Books in Latin Christianity: Selected Translations, 500–1317. pp. 113–132.
- French translation of his letters: Merlet, Lucien, ed. (1885). Lettres de Saint Ives: évéque de Chartres (in French). Chartres: Garnier.
- Women's Biography: Adela, countess of Blois, Chartres, and Meaux. Contains several of his letters to Adela of Normandy.
- Latin text and French translation of his letters: http://telma-chartes.irht.cnrs.fr/yves-de-chartres

== Literature ==
- Barker, Lynn K. "MS Bodl. Canon. Pat. Lat. 131 and a Lost Lactantius of John of Salisbury: Evidence in Search of a French Critic of Thomas Becket." Albion: A Quarterly Journal Concerned with British Studies, Vol. 22, No. 1 (Spring, 1990), pp. 26
- Brasington, Bruce C. (2006). "Lessons of Love: Bishop Ivo of Chartres as Teacher". In Vaughn, Sally N.; Rubenstein, Jay (eds.). Teaching and Learning in Northern Europe, 1000–1200. Brepolis Publishers n.v. pp. 129–147.
- Fournier, Paul (1898). Yves de Chartres et le droit canonique (in French). Paris: Bureaux de la Revue.
- Izbicki, Thomas M. "Review of Prefaces to Canon Law Books in Latin Christianity: Selected Translations, 500–1247. by Robert Somerville; Bruce Brasington." The Sixteenth Century Journal, Vol. 30, No. 1 (Spring, 1999), pp. 314.
- Livingstone, Amy. "Kith and Kin: Kinship and Family Structure of the Nobility of Eleventh- and Twelfth Century Blois-Chartres." French Historical Studies, Vol. 20, No. 3 (Summer, 1997), pp. 435, 452.
- LoPrete, Kimberly A. (2007). Adela of Blois, Countess and Lord. Dublin: Four Courts Press. ISBN 978-1-85182-563-9..
- Ott, John S. (1 December 2015). Bishops, Authority and Community in Northwestern Europe, c.1050–1150. Cambridge University Press. ISBN 978-1-316-36824-4.
- Rolker, Christof. "The earliest work of Ivo of Chartres: The case of Ivo's Eucharist florilegium and the canon law collections attributed to him." Zeitschrift der Savigny-Stiftung für Rechtsgeschichte, kanonistische Abteilung 124 (2007), pp. 109–127.
- Rolker, Christof (2010). Canon law and the letters of Ivo of Chartres. (Cambridge Studies in Medieval Life and Thought, Fourth Series 76). Cambridge University Press. doi:10.1017/CBO9780511674709. ISBN 9781139485067.
- Rolker, Christof (2019). "Ivo of Chartres (Yves de Chartres) (c. 1040–1115)". In Descamps, Olivier; Domingo, Rafael (eds.). Great Christian Jurists in French History. Cambridge University Press. pp. 19–34. doi:10.1017/9781108669979.002.
- Sprandel, Rolf (1962). Ivo von Chartres und seine Stellung in der Kirchengeschichte. Stuttgart: Hiersemann.
- Wormald, Patrick. The Making of the English Law: King Alfred to the Twelfth Century. [city unknown]: Blackwell Publishing, 1999. pp. 471.
