= Chaumont, Cher =

Chaumont
- Commune
- Coat of arms
- Location of Chaumont
- Location within France Location within Centre-Val de Loire
- Coordinates: 46°50′43″N 2°45′14″E
- Country: France
- Region: Centre-Val de Loire
- Department: Cher
- Arrondissement: Saint-Amand-Montrond
- Canton: Dun-sur-Auron
- Intercommunality: CC Les Trois Provinces

Government
  - Mayor (2020–2026): Philippe Willeme
- Area^{1}: 2.11 km^{2} (0.81 sq mi)
- Elevation: 260 m (850 ft)
- Highest elevation: 268 m (879 ft)
- Lowest elevation: 214 m (702 ft)
- Population (2023): 45
  - Density: 21/km^{2} (55/sq mi)
- Time zone: UTC+01:00 (CET)
  - Summer (DST): UTC+02:00 (CEST)
- INSEE/Postal code: 18060 /18350
- ^{1} French Land Register data, which excludes lakes, ponds, glaciers > 1 km^{2} (0.386 sq mi or 247 acres) and river estuaries.

Chaumont (French pronunciation: [ʃomɔ̃]) is a commune in the Cher department in the Centre-Val de Loire region of France.

== Geography ==
A farming area comprising a small village and a couple of hamlets situated some 22 miles (35 km) southeast of Bourges at the junction of the D91 and the D34 roads.

== Population ==
Historical population
| Year | Pop. | ±% p.a. |
|---|---|---|
| 1968 | 78 | — |
| 1975 | 60 | −3.68% |
| 1982 | 48 | −3.14% |
| 1990 | 37 | −3.20% |
| 1999 | 49 | +3.17% |
| 2007 | 47 | −0.52% |
| 2012 | 47 | +0.00% |
| 2017 | 54 | +2.82% |
| 2023 | 45 | −2.99% |
Source: INSEE

== See also ==
- Communes of the Cher department
