= Saint-Aignan-des-Noyers =

- Commune
- Location of Saint-Aignan-des-Noyers
- Location within France Location within Centre-Val de Loire
- Coordinates: 46°45′59″N 2°49′01″E
- Country: France
- Region: Centre-Val de Loire
- Department: Cher
- Arrondissement: Saint-Amand-Montrond
- Canton: Dun-sur-Auron
- Intercommunality: CC Les Trois Provinces

Government
  - Mayor (2020–2026): Stanislas Widowiak
- Area^{1}: 10.95 km^{2} (4.23 sq mi)
- Elevation: 150 m (490 ft)
- Highest elevation: 257 m (843 ft)
- Lowest elevation: 202 m (663 ft)
- Population (2023): 77
  - Density: 7.0/km^{2} (18/sq mi)
- Time zone: UTC+01:00 (CET)
  - Summer (DST): UTC+02:00 (CEST)
- INSEE/Postal code: 18196 /18600
- ^{1} French Land Register data, which excludes lakes, ponds, glaciers > 1 km^{2} (0.386 sq mi or 247 acres) and river estuaries.

Saint-Aignan-des-Noyers (French pronunciation: [sɛ̃.t‿ɛɲɑ̃ de nwaje]) is a commune in the Cher department in the Centre-Val de Loire region of France.

== Geography ==
A very small farming village situated some 25 miles (40 km) southeast of Bourges, at the junction of the D91 with the D951 road.

== Population ==
Historical population
| Year | Pop. | ±% p.a. |
|---|---|---|
| 1968 | 128 | — |
| 1975 | 139 | +1.18% |
| 1982 | 110 | −3.29% |
| 1990 | 84 | −3.31% |
| 1999 | 79 | −0.68% |
| 2007 | 97 | +2.60% |
| 2012 | 100 | +0.61% |
| 2017 | 94 | −1.23% |
| 2023 | 77 | −3.27% |
Source: INSEE

== Sights ==
- The church, dating from the nineteenth century.
- The ancient medieval village of Venoux.

== See also ==
- Communes of the Cher department
