= Givardon =

- Commune
- Location of Givardon
- Location within France Location within Centre-Val de Loire
- Coordinates: 46°50′27″N 2°49′04″E
- Country: France
- Region: Centre-Val de Loire
- Department: Cher
- Arrondissement: Saint-Amand-Montrond
- Canton: Dun-sur-Auron
- Intercommunality: CC Les Trois Provinces

Government
  - Mayor (2020–2026): Laurent Charrier
- Area^{1}: 21.9 km^{2} (8.5 sq mi)
- Elevation: 200 m (660 ft)
- Highest elevation: 268 m (879 ft)
- Lowest elevation: 184 m (604 ft)
- Population (2023): 300
  - Density: 14/km^{2} (35/sq mi)
- Time zone: UTC+01:00 (CET)
  - Summer (DST): UTC+02:00 (CEST)
- INSEE/Postal code: 18102 /18600
- ^{1} French Land Register data, which excludes lakes, ponds, glaciers > 1 km^{2} (0.386 sq mi or 247 acres) and river estuaries.

Givardon (French pronunciation: [ʒivaʁdɔ̃]) is a commune in the Cher department in the Centre-Val de Loire region of France.

== Geography ==
A farming area comprising the village and several hamlets situated by the banks of the small Sagonin river some 22 miles (35 km) southeast of Bourges at the junction of the D76 and the D34 roads.

== Population ==
Historical population
Year	Pop.	±% p.a.
1968	434	—
1975	364	−2.48%
1982	342	−0.89%
1990	316	−0.98%
1999	291	−0.91%
2007	324	+1.35%
2012	306	−1.14%
2017	298	−0.53%
2023	300	+0.11%
Source: INSEE

== Sights ==
- The church of St. Pierre.
- The chateau of Alarde, dating from the fifteenth century.

== See also ==
- Communes of the Cher department
