= Robert II of Flanders =

Count of Flanders from 1093 to 1111

Robert II
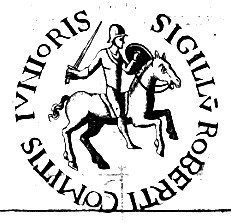
- Seal of Robert II

Count of Flanders
- Reign: 1093 – 1111
- Predecessor: Robert I
- Successor: Baldwin VII
- Born: c. 1065
- Died: 5 October 1111 (aged c. 46); Meaux, Kingdom of France
- Spouse: Clementia of Burgundy
- Issue: Baldwin VII of Flanders
- House: House of Flanders
- Father: Robert I of Flanders
- Mother: Gertrude of Saxony

Robert II (c. 1065 – 5 October 1111) was Count of Flanders from 1093 to 1111. He became known as Robert of Jerusalem (Robertus Hierosolimitanus) or Robert the Crusader after his exploits in the First Crusade.

== Early life ==
Robert was the eldest son of Robert I of Flanders (also known as Robert the Frisian) and Gertrude of Saxony. His father, hoping to place the cadet branch (or "Baldwinite" branch) of Flanders over the county, began to associate him with his rule around 1086. From 1085 to 1091 he was regent of the county while his father was away on pilgrimage to the Holy Land. Robert II became count in 1093 and supported the restoration of the diocese of Arras in order to limit the influence of the Holy Roman Empire in his dominion. With the approval of Pope Urban II, the diocese was split off from the diocese of Cambrai in 1093/94 and Lambert of Guines elected as its first bishop.

== First Crusade ==
In 1095, Robert joined the First Crusade, launched by Pope Urban II. He made his wife, Clementia of Burgundy, regent in Flanders, and formed the army of Robert the Crusader that followed the retinue of his kinsman Godfrey of Bouillon, Duke of Lower Lorraine. After reaching Constantinople, the crusaders were obliged to swear an oath of fealty to Byzantine emperor Alexius I Komnenus and promise to return to the Byzantine Empire any land they might capture. Robert, whose father had already served Alexius during his pilgrimage in the 1080s, had no problem swearing this oath, but some of the other leaders did and there was some delay in leaving the city.

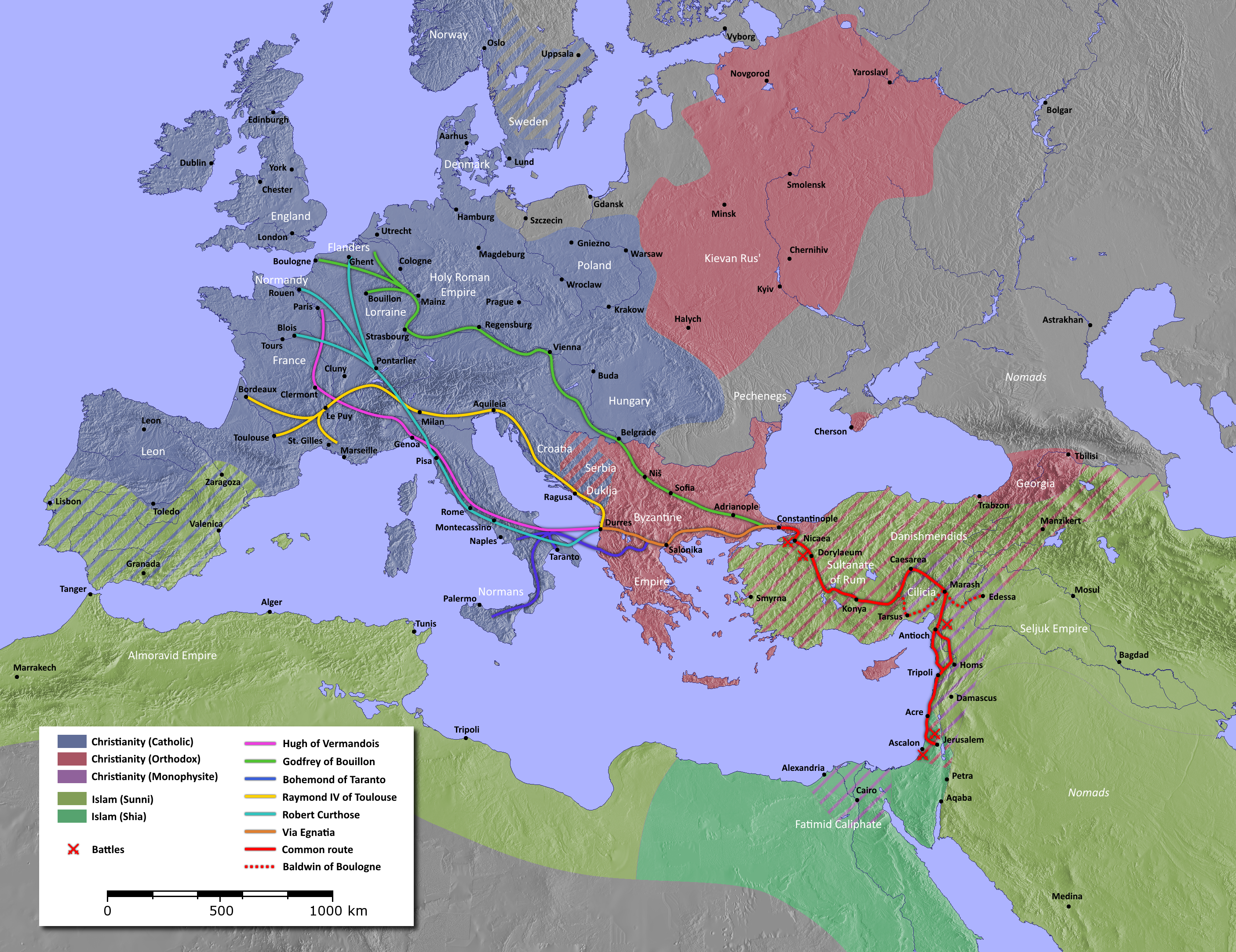
The routes of the First Crusade leaders.

Robert then participated in the Siege of Nicaea, after which the army was split into two groups. Robert marched with Stephen of Blois, Bohemond of Taranto, Robert Curthose, and the Byzantine guides, one day ahead of the rest of the crusaders. This army was surrounded by the Seljuk sultan Kilij Arslan at the Battle of Dorylaeum on 30 June 1097. The next day, the second army, led by Raymond IV of Toulouse, Godfrey of Bouillon, and Hugh of Vermandois, arrived and broke the encirclement; the two armies joined, with Robert and Raymond forming the centre. The Turks were defeated, and the crusaders continued their march.

At the end of 1097 the crusaders arrived at Antioch. The Siege of Antioch lasted many months; in December, Robert and Bohemund briefly left the army to raid the surrounding territory for food, and on 30 December they defeated an army sent to relieve Antioch, led by Duqaq, ruler of Damascus. Antioch was eventually betrayed to Bohemund by an Armenian guard, and Robert was among the first to enter the city, but only a few days later they were themselves besieged by Kerbogha. atabeg of Mosul. On 28 June 1098, the crusaders marched out to meet him in battle. Robert and Hugh of Vermandois led the first of six divisions. Kerbogha was defeated and the Muslim-held citadel finally surrendered to the crusaders. Robert, along with Bohemond, Raymond, and Godfrey, occupied the citadel, but Bohemund soon claimed the city for himself. Raymond also claimed it, but Robert supported Bohemund in this dispute.

The dispute delayed the crusade even further. Raymond left Antioch to attack Ma'arrat al-Numan, which was captured. Robert took part in this siege as well. Raymond then tried to bribe Robert and the other leaders to follow him instead of Bohemund; Robert was offered six thousand sous, but each attempted bribe was ignored. Raymond continued south to Jerusalem in January 1099, but Robert and Godfrey remained behind in Antioch until February. They rejoined Raymond's army at the Siege of Arqa. In June, Robert and Gaston IV of Bearn led the vanguard which arrived at Ramla, and with Tancred, he led an expedition into Samaria to find wood in order to construct siege engines for the Siege of Jerusalem. When Jerusalem was captured on 15 July, Robert supported Godfrey's claim over that of Raymond, and on August 9 marched out with him to meet the Fatimid army under al-Afdal Shahanshah which was coming to relieve Jerusalem. Robert formed part of the centre wing in the ensuing Battle of Ascalon, which resulted in a crusader victory. However, Godfrey and Raymond quarrelled over possession of Ascalon, and even Robert could not support Godfrey in this dispute; the city remained uncaptured, although the victory allowed for the establishment of the Kingdom of Jerusalem.

At the end of August, Robert returned home with Robert Curthose and Raymond. On the way back they captured Latakia, which was returned to the Byzantine emperor, as promised years before. Raymond remained there but both Roberts continued home by way of Constantinople, after declining Alexius' request to stay there in his service. Robert brought back with him a precious relic, the arm of Saint George, a gift from Alexius. The relic was placed in the church of Anchin Abbey in Flanders. After he returned, Robert built the monastery of St. Andrew in Sevenkerke (now Zevenkerke, near Bruges. Because of his crusade and the spoils he brought home, he was nicknamed Robert of Jerusalem.

== Later life ==
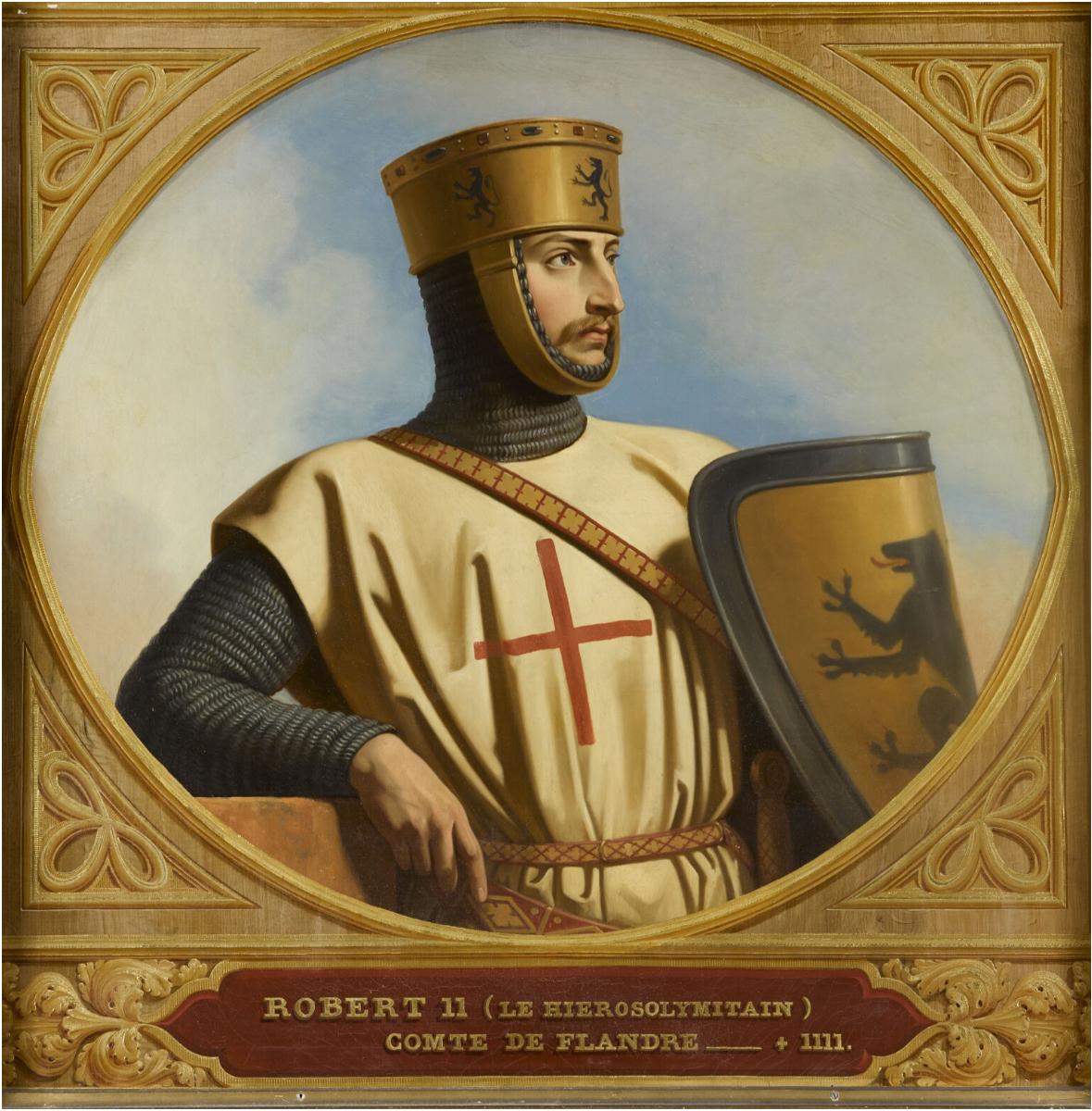
19th-century portrait by Henri Decaisne

During his absence, Holy Roman Emperor Henry IV had tried to seize imperial Flanders. Robert responded by supporting the revolt of the Commune of Cambrai against the emperor and his supporter, Bishop Gaulcher, and seized a number of castles. Peace was restored in 1102 and homage paid to the emperor for imperial Flanders, but after 1105, the new emperor, Henry V, marched on Flanders, with the aid of Count Baldwin III of Hainaut and an army from Holland. Robert stopped them outside of Douai and a new peace was signed, in which the emperor recognized Robert's claim to Douai and Cambrai.

Like his wife Clementia, Robert was a promoter of the Cluniac reform movement, supporting the reformers of the Abbey of Saint Bertin and assisting progressive ecclesiastic actors in general.

In 1103 he made an alliance with Henry I of England, offering 1000 cavalry in exchange for an annual tribute. When Henry refused to pay, Robert allied with his nominal overlord, Louis VI of France, and attacked Normandy. With the king diverted, Theobald IV of Blois led a revolt of the French barons. Robert led an army against Meaux. During the battle he fell off his horse and was trampled to death on 5 October 1111.

== Family ==
He married Clementia of Burgundy, sister of Pope Callistus II and daughter of William I, Count of Burgundy. They had three children, but only the oldest survived to adulthood. He succeeded Robert as Baldwin VII of Flanders.

== Sources ==
- Bouchard, Constance Brittain (1987). Sword, Miter, and Cloister:Nobility and Church in Burgundy, 980-1198. Cornell University Press.
- Frankopan, Peter (2012). The First Crusade: The Call from the East. Harvard University Press.
- Kostick, Conor (2008). The Social Structure of the First Crusade. Brill.
- Nicholas, Karen S. (1999). "Countesses as Rulers in Flanders". In Evergates, Theodore (ed.). Aristocratic Women in Medieval France. University of Pennsylvania Press. ISBN 978-0812200614.
- Nicholas, David M (2013). Medieval Flanders. Routledge.
- Paul, Nicholas L. (2012). To Follow in Their Footsteps: The Crusades and Family Memory in the High Middle Ages. Cornell University Press. ISBN 978-0801465543.
- Runciman, Steven (1951). A History of the Crusades: The First Crusade. Vol. I. Cambridge University Press.
- Riley-Smith, Jonathan (2002). The First Crusaders, 1095-1131. Cambridge University Press.
- Vanderputten, Steven (2013). Reform, Conflict, and the Shaping of Corporate Identities: Collected Studies on Benedictine Monasticism, 1050 - 1150. LIT Verlag Münster. ISBN 978-3-643-90429-4.

| Preceded by Robert I | Count of Flanders; 1093–1111 | Succeeded by Baldwin VII |
