= Sagonne =

- Commune
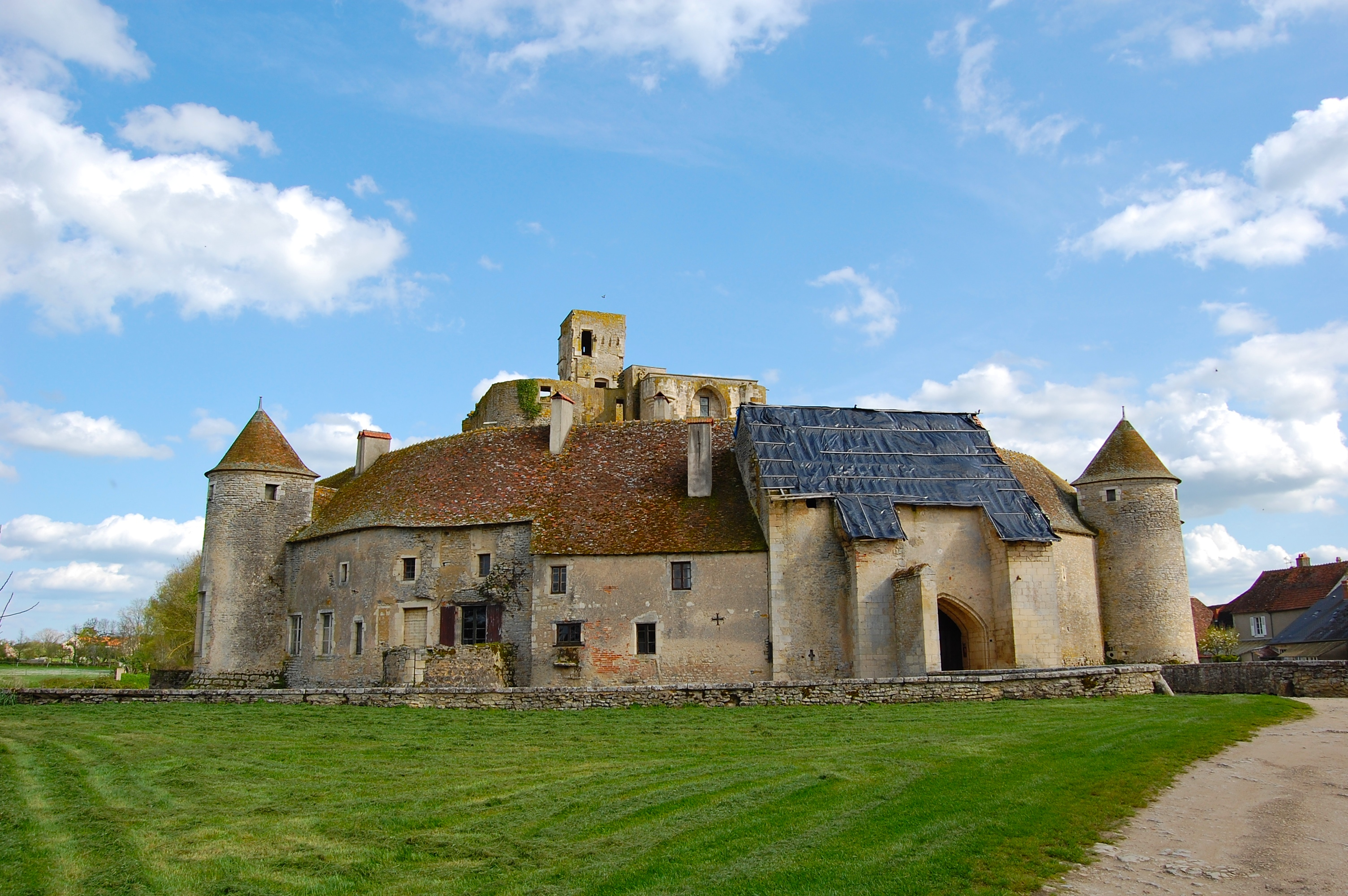
- Château de Sagonne
- Location of Sagonne
- Location within France Location within Centre-Val de Loire
- Coordinates: 46°51′03″N 2°49′33″E
- Country: France
- Region: Centre-Val de Loire
- Department: Cher
- Arrondissement: Saint-Amand-Montrond
- Canton: Dun-sur-Auron
- Intercommunality: CC Les Trois Provinces

Government
  - Mayor (2020–2026): Vincent Gauthier
- Area^{1}: 18.85 km^{2} (7.28 sq mi)
- Elevation: 202 m (663 ft)
- Highest elevation: 251 m (823 ft)
- Lowest elevation: 189 m (620 ft)
- Population (2023): 190
  - Density: 10/km^{2} (26/sq mi)
- Time zone: UTC+01:00 (CET)
  - Summer (DST): UTC+02:00 (CEST)
- INSEE/Postal code: 18195 /18600
- ^{1} French Land Register data, which excludes lakes, ponds, glaciers > 1 km^{2} (0.386 sq mi or 247 acres) and river estuaries.

Sagonne (French pronunciation: [saɡɔn]) is a commune in the Cher department in the Centre-Val de Loire region of France.

== Geography ==
Sagonne is farming village situated by the banks of the small river Sagonin, some 37 km southeast of Bourges, at the junction of the D76 with the D109 and D2076 roads.

== Population ==
Historical population
Year	Pop.	±% p.a.
1968	213	—
1975	204	−0.61%
1982	199	−0.35%
1990	201	+0.13%
1999	221	+1.06%
2007	229	+0.45%
2012	204	−2.29%
2017	190	−1.41%
2023	190	+0.00%
Source: INSEE

== Sights ==
- The Romanesque church of St. Laurent, dating from the twelfth century.
- Château de Sagonne, a 12th- to 17th-century castle, in the heart of the village.
- Some fifteenth-century houses.
- A museum at the castle, housing a 14th-century collection of weapons, paintings and tapestry.

== Personalities ==
- Charles II d'Amboise de Chaumont : Grand Admiral and Marshal of France.
- Gabrielle d'Estrée : mistress of Henry IV.
- Jules Hardouin-Mansart : architect to Louis XIV.

== See also ==
- Communes of the Cher department
