= Clementia of Burgundy =

Clementia of Burgundy (c. 1078 – c. 1133) was countess of Flanders by marriage to Robert II of Flanders. She acted as regent of Flanders from 1096 until 1100, while her spouse was on crusade, and in the name of their son Baldwin VII from 1111 until 1119.

== Background ==
Clementia was the daughter of Count William I of Burgundy and a noblewoman named Stephanie. Her family was heavily attached to the Catholic Church, with two of her brothers becoming archbishops and another brother becoming Pope Callixtus II.

== Countess of Flanders ==
In 1092, Clementia married Robert II, Count of Flanders and became Countess of Flanders. Her husband gave her an impressive dower, which included, "one-third of Flanders, including twelve towns located in the maritime and southwestern regions of Flanders, and stretching from Lille to Douai to Bapaume." Because her dower contained so much land and so many towns, it created the opportunity for Clementia to build relationships with the people, which further allowed her to become the "patron of various monasteries, [to] develop bonds of friendship with important families, and help spread comital influence throughout the area. By doing so, [she] developed the power to participate in the rule of Flanders."

Clementia and her husband Count Robert II had three sons together, and it was their son Baldwin that would come into rule after the death of Robert II in 1111.

=== First regency ===
When her husband, Count Robert II, left to go on the First Crusade in 1096, Clementia became regent of Flanders. As the ruling force she influenced the production of money, such as imprinting her own name on minted coins. She was also asked to help deal with violent matters like protecting pilgrims from assault in Bapaume. Her husband sent her relics of the Virgin, St Matthew and St Nicholas, which he had received during the journey from his sister and her husband Duke Roger of Apulia. Lambert of Arras enshrined them at the priory of Watten in attendance of Clemence and other Flemish nobles.

When Robert II returned from crusading though, her power and influence did not end. They ruled together, with her name appearing on many of the charters instigated by her husband. Much of her influence after her husband's return becomes focused on her involvement with the church and specifically her patronage of multiple monasteries, abbes, and the donating of land for church use.

=== Second regency ===
In 1111 Count Robert II died in a battle at Meaux. After his death their son Baldwin VII came into power. Despite being eighteen years old and thus old enough to rule alone, Clementia was formally recognized as his co-regent throughout his reign. Clementia was extremely powerful, in particular, during his first year of reign, with all the charters of the time containing her name. They ruled together with relative peace, until Baldwin VII began to form a stronger bond with his cousin Charles of Denmark.

In 1119, Baldwin VII was killed in battle and Charles succeeded him as count. Clementia did not like Charles and used her influence to raise an army against him. She lost the battle to Charles when he captured four of her dower towns, which led to the cutting off of resources for her army. This caused Clementia to lose her power to rule Flanders.

Regardless, "Clematia continued to issue charters concerning her dower lands and towns until her death in 1133."

== Second marriage ==
After her son, Baldwin VII, died in 1119, she married Count Godfrey I of Louvain. Clementia may have been the mother of Godfrey's son Joscelin, although some historians consider the possibility that he was born of a mistress.

== Sources ==
- Adair, Penelope Ann (1993). Ego et Uxor Mea... :Countess Clemente and her Role in the Comital Family and Flanders (1092-1133) (Thesis). University of California Press.
- Bouchard, Constance B. (1987). Sword, Miter, and Cloister: Nobility and the Church in Burgundy 980-1198. Cornell University Press.
- Evergates, Theodore (1999). Aristocratic Women in Medieval France. University of Pennsylvania Press.
- Nicholas, David (1992). Medieval Flanders. Longman. ISBN 0582016789.
- Runciman, S. (1951). A History of the Crusades: The First Crusade and the Foundation of the Kingdom of Jerusalem. Cambridge University Press.
- Sanders, I.J. (1960). English Baronies. Clarendon Press.
- Vanderputten, Steven (2013). Reform, Conflict, and the Shaping of Corporate Identities: Collected Studies on Benedictine Monasticism, 1050 - 1150. LIT Verlag Münster. ISBN 978-3-643-90429-4.

Vacant Title last held by Gertrude of Saxony	Countess consort of Flanders; 1093–1111	Vacant Title next held by Hawise of Brittany
