= Vereaux =

- Commune
- Location of Vereaux
- Location within France Location within Centre-Val de Loire
- Coordinates: 46°52′50″N 2°52′48″E
- Country: France
- Region: Centre-Val de Loire
- Department: Cher
- Arrondissement: Saint-Amand-Montrond
- Canton: Dun-sur-Auron
- Intercommunality: CC Les Trois Provinces

Government
  - Mayor (2020–2026): Jean-Claude Lamouroux
- Area^{1}: 22.96 km^{2} (8.86 sq mi)
- Elevation: 224 m (735 ft)
- Highest elevation: 236 m (774 ft)
- Lowest elevation: 191 m (627 ft)
- Population (2023): 143
  - Density: 6.23/km^{2} (16.1/sq mi)
- Time zone: UTC+01:00 (CET)
  - Summer (DST): UTC+02:00 (CEST)
- INSEE/Postal code: 18275 /18600
- ^{1} French Land Register data, which excludes lakes, ponds, glaciers > 1 km^{2} (0.386 sq mi or 247 acres) and river estuaries.

Vereaux (French pronunciation: [vəʁo]) is a commune in the Cher department in the Centre-Val de Loire region of France.

== Geography ==
A farming area comprising the village and a hamlet situated on the banks of the small river Fausse, about 27 miles (43 km) southeast of Bourges at the junction of the D43 and the D42 road.

== Population ==
Historical population
| Year | Pop. | ±% p.a. |
|---|---|---|
| 1968 | 230 | — |
| 1975 | 200 | −1.98% |
| 1982 | 182 | −1.34% |
| 1990 | 168 | −1.00% |
| 1999 | 159 | −0.61% |
| 2007 | 168 | +0.69% |
| 2012 | 166 | −0.24% |
| 2017 | 140 | −3.35% |
| 2023 | 143 | +0.35% |
Source: INSEE

== Sights ==
- The church of St. Martin, dating from the twelfth century.
- Traces of a feudal castle.

== See also ==
- Communes of the Cher department
