= Augy-sur-Aubois =

- Commune
- Coat of arms
- Location of Augy-sur-Aubois
- Location within France Location within Centre-Val de Loire
- Coordinates: 46°47′07″N 2°50′41″E
- Country: France
- Region: Centre-Val de Loire
- Department: Cher
- Arrondissement: Saint-Amand-Montrond
- Canton: Dun-sur-Auron
- Intercommunality: CC Trois Provinces

Government
  - Mayor (2020–2026): Déborah Combat
- Area^{1}: 30.46 km^{2} (11.76 sq mi)
- Elevation: 206 m (676 ft)
- Highest elevation: 256 m (840 ft)
- Lowest elevation: 197 m (646 ft)
- Population (2023): 278
  - Density: 9.13/km^{2} (23.6/sq mi)
- Time zone: UTC+01:00 (CET)
  - Summer (DST): UTC+02:00 (CEST)
- INSEE/Postal code: 18017 /18600
- ^{1} French Land Register data, which excludes lakes, ponds, glaciers > 1 km^{2} (0.386 sq mi or 247 acres) and river estuaries.

Augy-sur-Aubois (French pronunciation: [oʒi syʁ obwa]) is a commune in the Cher department in the Centre-Val de Loire region of France by the banks of both the river Aubois and the disused Canal de Berry some 30 miles (48 km) southeast of Bourges.

== Population ==
Historical population
Year	Pop.	±% p.a.
1968	456	—
1975	375	−2.76%
1982	395	+0.75%
1990	353	−1.40%
1999	294	−2.01%
2007	301	+0.29%
2012	297	−0.27%
2017	290	−0.48%
2023	278	−0.70%
Source: INSEE

== See also ==
- Communes of the Cher department
