= Mornay-sur-Allier =

- Commune
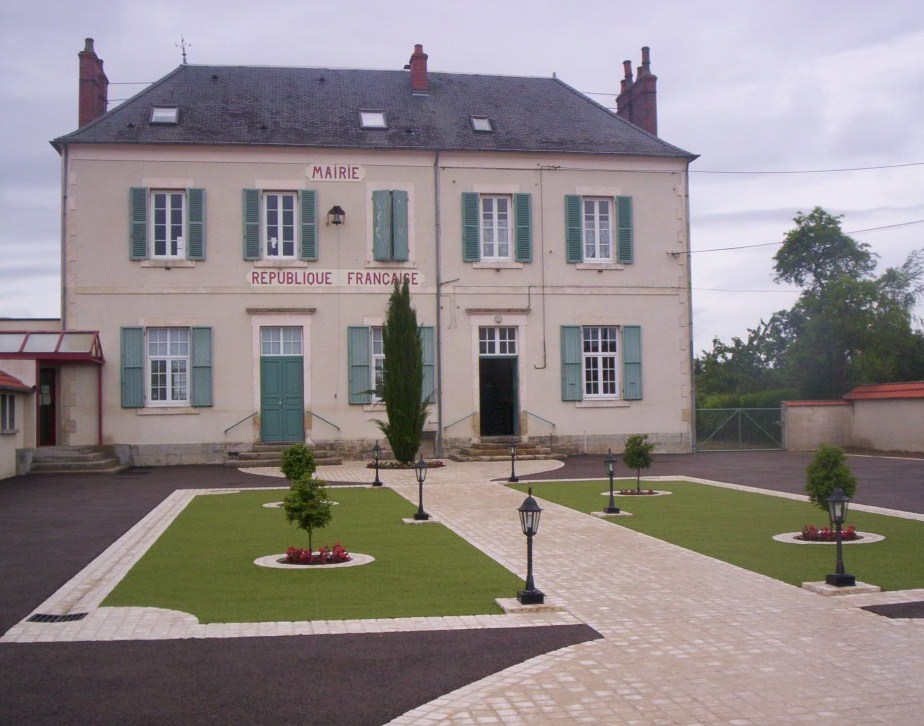
- Town hall
- Location of Mornay-sur-Allier
- Location within France Location within Centre-Val de Loire
- Coordinates: 46°49′11″N 3°01′47″E
- Country: France
- Region: Centre-Val de Loire
- Department: Cher
- Arrondissement: Saint-Amand-Montrond
- Canton: Dun-sur-Auron
- Intercommunality: CC Les Trois Provinces

Government
  - Mayor (2020–2026): Isabelle Perez
- Area^{1}: 21.62 km^{2} (8.35 sq mi)
- Elevation: 200 m (660 ft)
- Highest elevation: 222 m (728 ft)
- Lowest elevation: 179 m (587 ft)
- Population (2023): 413
  - Density: 19.1/km^{2} (49.5/sq mi)
- Time zone: UTC+01:00 (CET)
  - Summer (DST): UTC+02:00 (CEST)
- INSEE/Postal code: 18155 /18600
- ^{1} French Land Register data, which excludes lakes, ponds, glaciers > 1 km^{2} (0.386 sq mi or 247 acres) and river estuaries.

Mornay-sur-Allier (French pronunciation: [mɔʁnɛ syʁ alje]) is a commune in the Cher department in the Centre-Val de Loire region of France.

== Geography ==
An area of lakes and streams, forestry and farming comprising the village and several hamlets situated by the banks of the river Allier, some 33 miles (53 km) southeast of Bourges, at the junction of the D45 and the D2076 roads. The commune borders the departments of Allier and Nièvre.

== Population ==
Historical population
Year	Pop.	±% p.a.
1968	438	—
1975	403	−1.18%
1982	394	−0.32%
1990	407	+0.41%
1999	440	+0.87%
2007	450	+0.28%
2012	424	−1.18%
2017	431	+0.33%
2023	413	−0.71%
Source: INSEE

== Sights ==
- The church of St. Symphorien, dating from the twelfth century

== See also ==
- Communes of the Cher department
