= Neuvy-le-Barrois =

- Commune
- Location of Neuvy-le-Barrois
- Location within France Location within Centre-Val de Loire
- Coordinates: 46°51′56″N 3°02′17″E
- Country: France
- Region: Centre-Val de Loire
- Department: Cher
- Arrondissement: Saint-Amand-Montrond
- Canton: Dun-sur-Auron
- Intercommunality: CC Les Trois Provinces

Government
  - Mayor (2020–2026): Martine Rossi
- Area^{1}: 41.98 km^{2} (16.21 sq mi)
- Elevation: 209 m (686 ft)
- Highest elevation: 223 m (732 ft)
- Lowest elevation: 173 m (568 ft)
- Population (2023): 147
  - Density: 3.50/km^{2} (9.07/sq mi)
- Time zone: UTC+01:00 (CET)
  - Summer (DST): UTC+02:00 (CEST)
- INSEE/Postal code: 18164 /18600
- ^{1} French Land Register data, which excludes lakes, ponds, glaciers > 1 km^{2} (0.386 sq mi or 247 acres) and river estuaries.

Neuvy-le-Barrois (French pronunciation: [nøvi lə baʁwa]) is a commune in the Cher department in the Centre-Val de Loire region of France.

== Geography ==
An area of lakes, streams, forestry and farming comprising a small village and several hamlets situated by the banks of the river Allier, some 38 miles (61 km) southeast of Bourges, at the junction of the D41 with the D222, D45 and the D78 roads. The river forms the border with the departement of Allier.

== Population ==
Historical population
Year	Pop.	±% p.a.
1968	248	—
1975	169	−5.33%
1982	165	−0.34%
1990	147	−1.43%
1999	153	+0.45%
2007	158	+0.40%
2012	157	−0.13%
2017	139	−2.41%
2023	147	+0.94%
Source: INSEE

== Sights ==
- The church of St. Martin, dating from the twelfth century. (Monument Historique)
- The motte of a feudal castle.
- The chateau of Neuvy.
- The chateau of Pey.

== Personalities ==
- Sculptor Jean Baffier (1851–1920) was born here.

== See also ==
- Communes of the Cher department
