= Neuilly-en-Dun =

- Commune
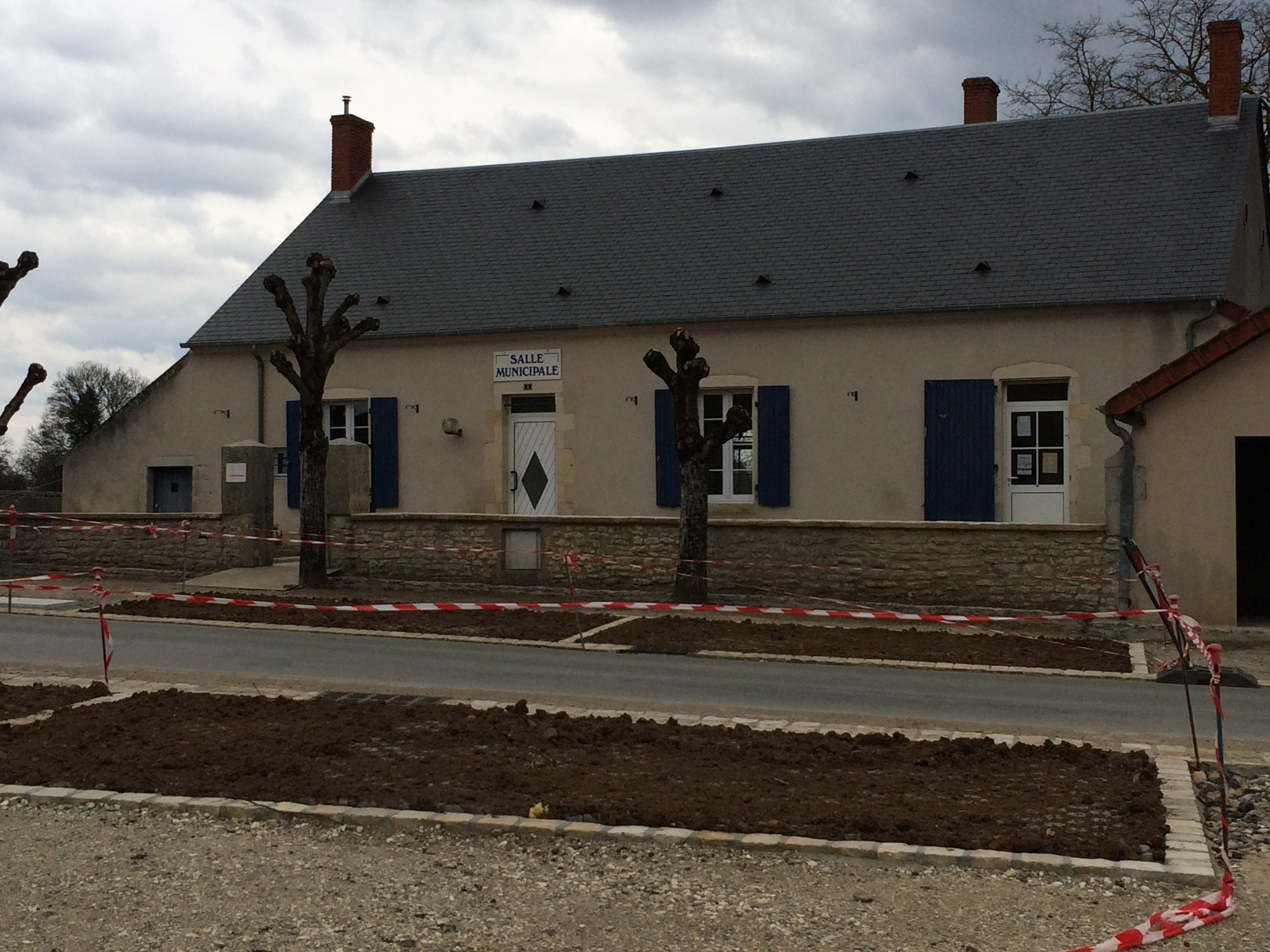
- Town hall
- Location of Neuilly-en-Dun
- Location within France Location within Centre-Val de Loire
- Coordinates: 46°48′39″N 2°47′01″E
- Country: France
- Region: Centre-Val de Loire
- Department: Cher
- Arrondissement: Saint-Amand-Montrond
- Canton: Dun-sur-Auron
- Intercommunality: CC Les Trois Provinces

Government
  - Mayor (2020–2026): Serge Butard
- Area^{1}: 29.46 km^{2} (11.37 sq mi)
- Elevation: 199 m (653 ft)
- Highest elevation: 265 m (869 ft)
- Lowest elevation: 178 m (584 ft)
- Population (2023): 228
  - Density: 7.74/km^{2} (20.0/sq mi)
- Time zone: UTC+01:00 (CET)
  - Summer (DST): UTC+02:00 (CEST)
- INSEE/Postal code: 18161 /18600
- ^{1} French Land Register data, which excludes lakes, ponds, glaciers > 1 km^{2} (0.386 sq mi or 247 acres) and river estuaries.

Neuilly-en-Dun (French pronunciation: [nœji ɑ̃ dœ̃]) is a commune in the Cher department in the Centre-Val de Loire region of France.

== Geography ==
An area of lakes, streams and farming comprising the village and several hamlets situated by the banks of the Auron and Sagonin rivers and the canal de Berry, some 28 miles (45 km) southeast of Bourges, at the junction of the D91 and the D76 roads.

== Population ==
Historical population
Year	Pop.	±% p.a.
1968	397	—
1975	383	−0.51%
1982	338	−1.77%
1990	277	−2.46%
1999	258	−0.79%
2007	300	+1.90%
2012	254	−3.27%
2017	224	−2.48%
2023	228	+0.30%
Source: INSEE

== Sights ==
- The church of St. Roch, dating from the twelfth century
- The sixteenth-century chateau of Lienesse, with a dovecote.

== See also ==
- Communes of the Cher department
