= Sancoins =

- Commune
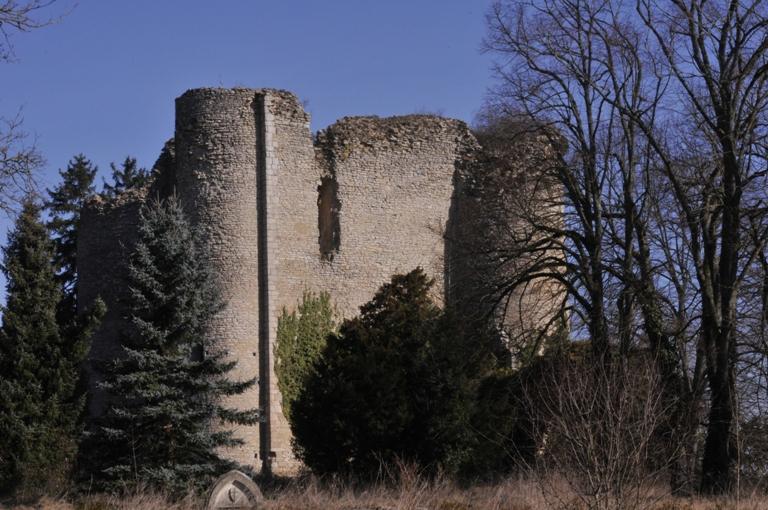
- Donjon of Louy castle

- Flag Coat of arms
- Location of Sancoins
- Location within France Location within Centre-Val de Loire
- Coordinates: 46°49′58″N 2°55′11″E
- Country: France
- Region: Centre-Val de Loire
- Department: Cher
- Arrondissement: Saint-Amand-Montrond
- Canton: Dun-sur-Auron
- Intercommunality: CC Les Trois Provinces

Government
  - Mayor (2020–2026): Pierre Guiblin
- Area^{1}: 53.52 km^{2} (20.66 sq mi)
- Highest elevation: 233 m (764 ft)
- Lowest elevation: 192 m (630 ft)
- Population (2023): 2,951
  - Density: 55.14/km^{2} (142.8/sq mi)
- Time zone: UTC+01:00 (CET)
  - Summer (DST): UTC+02:00 (CEST)
- INSEE/Postal code: 18242 /18600
- ^{1} French Land Register data, which excludes lakes, ponds, glaciers > 1 km^{2} (0.386 sq mi or 247 acres) and river estuaries.

Sancoins (French pronunciation: [sɑ̃kwɛ̃]) is a commune in the Cher department in the Centre-Val de Loire region of France.

== Geography ==
An area of farming and associated light industry comprising a small town and several hamlets situated by the banks of both the river Aubois and the canal de Berry, about 26 miles (42 km) southeast of Bourges, at the junction of the D2076 with the D951 and D920 roads. The commune shares its southern border with that of the department of Allier.

== Population ==
Historical population
Year	Pop.	±% p.a.
1968	3,502	—
1975	3,556	+0.22%
1982	3,667	+0.44%
1990	3,634	−0.11%
1999	3,562	−0.22%
2007	3,177	−1.42%
2012	3,266	+0.55%
2017	3,080	−1.17%
2023	2,951	−0.71%
Source: INSEE

== Sights ==
- The church of St. Martin, rebuilt in the nineteenth century.
- The fourteenth-century castle of Jouy, built by Pierre de Giac, chancellor of the Duke of Berry.
- Several 15th and sixteenth-century buildings in the main town.
- Javoulet lake.
- The sixteenth-century ‘Joan of Arc’ tower.

== Personalities ==
- Oscar Méténier (1859–1913), writer, was born here.
- Marguerite Audoux (1863–1937), writer, was born here.

== See also ==
- Communes of the Cher department
