= Berry, France =

Historical province of France, located in Centre-Val de Loire

Duchy of Berry Duché de Berri
- 1101–1791
- Provincial flag Coat of arms

- Map of Berry in 1789
- Capital: Bourges
- Government
  - Type: Province
- King of the Franks / King of France
  - 1101–1108: Philip I
  - 1774–1790: Louis XVI
- Governor of Berry
  - 1466–1482: Jean III de Vendôme
  - 1760–1789: Louis Joseph de Bourbon
- Historical era: Early Modern
  - Established: 1101
  - Provinces dissolved: 1791
Preceded by	Succeeded by
County of Berry; County of Bourges	Cher; Indre
- Today part of: France

The Duchy of Berry (French pronunciation: [beʁi]; Occitan: Barric; Latin: Bituria) was a former province located in central France. It was a province of France until departments replaced the provinces on 4 March 1790, when Berry became divided between the départements of Cher (Upper Berry) and Indre (Lower Berry).

== History ==
The ancient province of Berry with the communes and départements.

Berry is notable as the birthplace of several kings and other members of the French royal family, and was the birthplace of the knight Baldwin Chauderon, who fought in the First Crusade. In the Middle Ages, Berry became the center of the Duchy of Berry's holdings. It is also known for an illuminated manuscript produced in the 14th–15th century called Les Très Riches Heures du Duc de Berry.

In later times, the writer George Sand spent much of her life at her Berry estate in Nohant, and Berry's landscape and specific culture figure in much of Sand's writings.

The Duchy was governed by the Duke/Duchess of Berry, who after 1601 was a senior member of the French royal family. The title of 'Duke of Berry' was by this period divested of territorial significance, and instead held by princes of the royal house, the last of which was Charles Ferdinand d'Artois.

In c.750, the Counties of Berry and Bourges were created by the King of the Franks. In 843, the County of Berry became part of the Royal domain or crown lands controlled by the king. From 878 to 892, the county was part of the County of Auvergne, but became independent once more in 893. In 972, the County of Bourges was reduced to a Viscounty as the Viscomte de Bourges, and in 1101 was annexed by France. In 1360, the county was raised to a duchy as the Duchy of Berry. In 1221, the Seigneuries of Châteauroux and Issoudun were annexed into the duchy.

The first governor of the province appears to have been appointed on 14 March 1698, when Adrien Maurice de Noailles, Duke of Noailles became military governor when he was only 19 years old.

In 1778, Louis XVI convened the provincial assemblies of Berry, and considered expanding the assembly to other provinces, but abandoned this idea after experiencing the opposition of the privileged classes in Berry.

In 1790, when the former provinces were dissolved, the Duchy of Berry was split between two departments: Cher in Upper (eastern) Berry and Indre in Lower (western) Berry. Some communes also became part of the Allier, Creuse, Loiret, and Loir-et-Cher departments as well.

== Governors ==
The governors of French provinces during the Ancien Régime were typically military commanders and provided military oversight in the region. This included recruitment, movement of troops, and – if needed – dealing with civil disobedience. Below is a list of the governors of Berry during its time as a province.

== Duke of Berry ==
In October 1360, the title 'Duke of Berry' was created by King John II of France for his third-born son, John of Poitiers. The duke was followed by several members of the senior royal family, establishing a tradition of the duke being a member of the House of Valois. In 1505 however, the last Duchess of Berry Joan of France died of natural causes and the title was merged into the royal domain. In 1527, the title was re-created for Marguerite de Navarre until the title was once again dissolved in 1601 following the death of Duchess Louise of Lorraine.

In 1686, King Louis XIV re-created the title for his third grandson Charles de Bourbon, however the title was dissolved following the death of the Duke in 1714. In 1754, Louis XV re-created the title for his grandson Louis-Auguste de Bourbon (later King Louis XVI), who dropped the title in 1765 when he became Dauphin. In 1778, Louis XVI once again re-created the title for his nephew Charles Ferdinand, Duke of Berry. In 1820, the title was finally dissolved once more when the last duke was assassinated.

While Berry was a province, the Duke of Berry was de jure leader of the area. The dukes included:

Coat of Arms	Portrait	Name	Other Titles	Tenure
		Charles de Bourbon	Duke of Angoulême (1710–death); Duke of Alençon (1710–death); Count of Ponthieu (1710–death)	31 July 1686 – 5 May 1714
	Van Loo, Louis-Michel - The Dauphin Louis Auguste, later Louis XVI	Louis-Auguste de Bourbon		23 August 1765 – 20 December 1765
Arms of Charles dArtois	Danloux - Charles Ferdinand d'Artois (1778–1820), duc de Berry	Charles Ferdinand d'Artois		24 January 1778 – 14 February 1820

== Etymology ==
The name of Berry, like that of its capital, Bourges, originated with the Gaulish tribe of the Bituriges, who settled in the area before the Roman armies of Julius Caesar conquered Gaul. The name of the tribe gave name to the region, often mentioned in Medieval Latin sources as: Bituria.

== Brenne ==
La Brenne, located west of Châteauroux and east of Tournon-Saint-Martin in the Indre department, is a region which of old straddled on the former provinces of Berry and Touraine, and is now a protected natural area (Parc naturel régional de la Brenne) as well called Pays des mille étangs, because of its many ponds created since the 8th c. by the monks of the local abbeys for pisciculture.

La Brenne is also designated as a Ramsar wetland of international importance, and by 2016 around 3,000 ponds had been counted within its boundaries.

== See also ==
- Berrichon dialect
- Saint-Benoît-du-Sault

== General and cited sources ==
- Abbott, Paul D. (1981). Provinces, pays, and seigneuries of France. Myrtleford, Australia. ISBN 9780959377309.
- Devailly, Guy (1973). Le Berry du Xe siècle au milieu du XIIIe: Étude politique, religieuse, sociale, et économique. Paris-La Haye: Mouton. ISBN 9783111631066.
- Legeard, Emmanuel (2024). Histoire du Berry. Paris: Gisserot. ISBN 9782755811193.
