= House of Luxembourg =

European royal and imperial family

House of Luxembourg Maison de Luxembourg
- Royal family
- Parent family: House of Limburg
- Country: Holy Roman Empire, Bohemia, Hungary, Croatia, France, Luxembourg
- Founded: 12 February 1247; 779 years ago
- Founder: Henry V, Count of Luxembourg
- Final ruler: Elizabeth of Luxembourg
- Titles: Holy Roman Emperor (elective); King of Bohemia; King of Hungary; Croatia; Count/Duke of Luxembourg; Others: Margrave of Brandenburg; Margrave of Moravia; Duke of Görlitz; Count of Tyrol; Count of Soissons; Counts of Ligny; Count of Saint-Pol; Count of Brienne; Count of Conversano
- Distinctions: Order of the Dragon
- Dissolution: 2 August 1451; 575 years ago
- Deposition: 1443; 583 years ago
- Cadet branches: Luxembourg-Brienne (extinct in 1648)

The House of Luxembourg (Luxembourgish: D'Lëtzebuerger Haus; French: Maison de Luxembourg; German: Haus Luxemburg) or Luxembourg dynasty was a royal family of the Holy Roman Empire in the Late Middle Ages, whose members between 1308 and 1437 ruled as kings of Germany and Holy Roman emperors as well as kings of Bohemia, Hungary and Croatia. Their rule was twice interrupted by the rival House of Wittelsbach. The family takes its name from its ancestral county of Luxembourg, which passed to the House of Habsburg in 1443 following the extinction of the dynasty's male line.

== History ==
As shown below, this royal Luxembourg dynasty were not male-line descendants of the original counts of Luxembourg. They descended instead from the House of Limburg-Arlon, who had been dukes of Lower Lorraine in the 11th century. In 1247 Henry, younger son of Duke Waleran III of Limburg inherited the County of Luxembourg, becoming Count Henry V of Luxembourg, upon the death of his mother Countess Ermesinde. Her father, Count Henry "the Blind", was count of Namur through his father, and count of Luxembourg through his mother, who was also named Ermesinde. This elder Ermesinde was a member of the original House of Luxembourg, which was a branch of the House of Ardenne, and had ruled Luxembourg since the late 10th century.

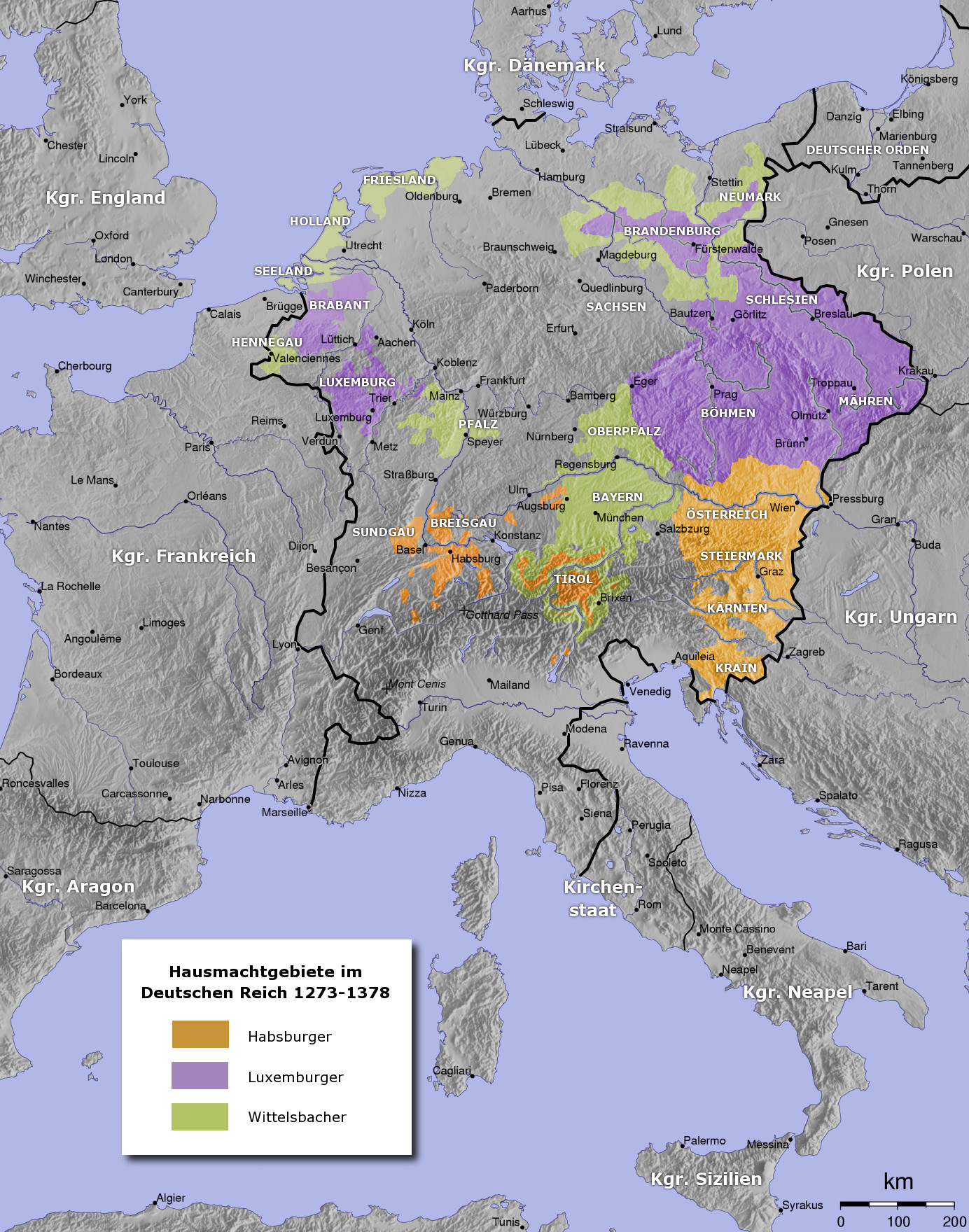
Holy Roman Empire under Charles IV Habsburg Luxembourg Wittelsbach

Henry V's grandson Henry VII, Count of Luxembourg upon the death of his father Henry VI at the 1288 Battle of Worringen, was elected Rex Romanorum in 1308. The election was necessary after the Habsburg king Albert I of Germany had been murdered, and Henry, backed and orchestrated by his brother Archbishop-Elector Baldwin of Trier, prevailed against Charles, Count of Valois.

Henry arranged the marriage of his son John with the Přemyslid heiress Elisabeth of Bohemia in 1310, through whom the House of Luxembourg acquired the Kingdom of Bohemia, enabling that family to compete more effectively for power with the Habsburg and Wittelsbach dynasties. One year after being crowned Holy Roman Emperor at Rome, Henry VII, still on campaign in Italy, died in 1313.

The prince-electors, perturbed by the rise of the Luxembourgs, disregarded the claims raised by Henry's heir King John, and the rule over the Empire was assumed by the Wittelsbach duke Louis of Bavaria. John instead concentrated on securing his rule in Bohemia and gradually vassalized the Piast dukes of adjacent Silesia from 1327 until 1335. His son Charles IV acceded to the Imperial throne in 1346. His Golden Bull of 1356 served as a constitution of the Empire for centuries. Charles not only acquired the duchies of Brabant and Limburg in the west, but also the former March of Lusatia and even the Margraviate of Brandenburg in 1373 under the Kingdom of Bohemia.

The family's decline began under Charles' son King Wenceslaus, deposed by the prince-electors in 1400 who chose the Wittelsbach Elector Palatine Rupert. In 1410 rule was assumed by Wenceslaus' brother Sigismund, who once again stabilized the rule of the Luxembourgs and even contributed to end the Western Schism in 1417; however, with his death in 1437, the senior branch of the dynasty became extinct. He was succeeded by his son-in-law, the Habsburg archduke Albert V of Austria. The Habsburgs finally prevailed as Luxembourg heirs, ruling the Empire until the extinction of their senior branch upon the death of Maria Theresa in 1780.

== Notable members ==
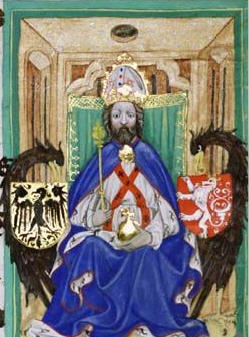
Emperor Charles IV

- Baldwin (c. 1285–1354) – prince-archbishop of Trier and thereby archchancellor of Burgundy 1307–1354.
- Henry VII (1275–1313) – elected king of Germany in 1308 in succession to the assassinated Albert I, crowned emperor in 1312. He was succeeded by Louis IV from the House of Wittelsbach. Brother of Baldwin.
  - John the Blind (1296–1346) – only son of Henry. He was enfeoffed with Bohemia by his father in 1310, married the Přemyslid heiress Elisabeth of Bohemia and deposed the Bohemian king Henry the Carinthian.
    - Charles IV (1316–1378) — eldest son of John. He was elected king of Germany in opposition to Louis IV in 1346 and succeeded his father as king of Bohemia in the same year, crowned emperor in 1355.
      - Wenceslaus (1361–1419) – eldest surviving son of Charles. As margrave of Brandenburg from 1373 to 1378, he was elected king of Germany in 1376 and succeeded his father as king of Bohemia in 1378. Declared deposed by the prince-electors in 1400, he was succeeded by Rupert of Wittelsbach.
      - Sigismund (1368–1437) – younger son of Charles. Margrave of Brandenburg from 1378 to 1388, he was king of Hungary and Croatia from 1387 in right of his wife Mary, and was elected king of Germany in 1411, succeeding his brother as king of Bohemia in 1419, being crowned emperor in 1433 yet he left no male heirs.
        - Elizabeth of Luxembourg, only surviving child of Emperor Sigismund, married Archduke Albert V of Austria from the Albertinian line of the House of Habsburg in 1422, becoming queen of Hungary from 1437 as well as queen of Germany and Bohemia from 1438 until Albert's death in 1439. She was the heiress who conveyed the major portion of the vast Luxembourg inheritance to the Habsburgs and, later, the Jagiellons through her daughter Elisabeth of Austria.
    - John Henry, Margrave of Moravia – younger brother of Charles. He married Countess Margaret of Tyrol, daughter of Henry the Carinthian in 1330.
      - Jobst of Moravia (1351–1411) – eldest son of John Henry. Margrave of Brandenburg 1388–1411, elected King of the Romans in 1410.
      - John Sobieslaw of Moravia (1352–1380) – second son of John Henry, and junior margrave of Moravia.
      - Prokop of Moravia (c. 1358–1405) – son of John Henry. Margrave of Moravia from 1375 until his death in 1405.
        - George of Luxembourg (died 1457) – son of Prokop. The last known member of the Luxembourg family.

== Genealogy ==
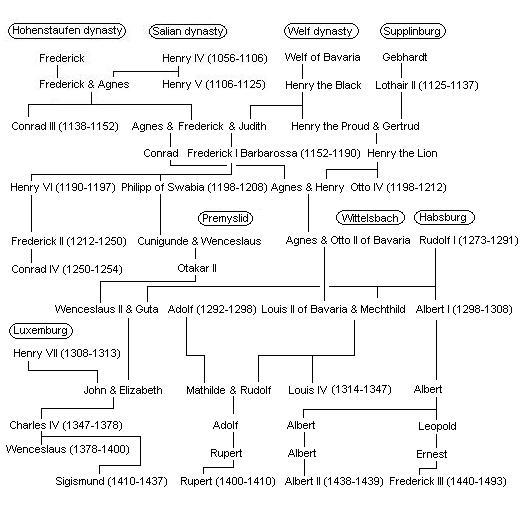
Family tree of the Staufen dynasty from the 11th to 15th centuries

=== House of Limburg–Arlon ===
Having succeeded to the county of Luxemburg, the younger branch of the House of Limburg-Arlon is the family that succeeded in getting one of its scions elected Holy Roman Emperor. From there descended the Kings of Bohemia, several other Emperors and a King of Hungary as shown below.

House of Luxemburg

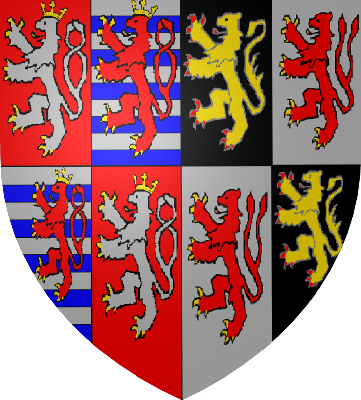
Henry V Count of Luxembourg (1217 †1281)
Henry VI; Count of Luxembourg (1250 † 1288)	Waleran I (1252 † 1288) Lord of Ligny
Henry VII (1275 † 1313) Holy Roman Emperor	Waleran II (1275 † 1354) Lord of Ligny
John the Blind (1296 † 1346) King of Bohemia	John I (1300 † 1364) Lord of Ligny
Charles IV (1316 † 1378) Holy Roman Emperor; King of Bohemia	John Henry (1322 † 1372) Margrave of Moravia	Wenceslaus I (1337 † 1383) Duke of Luxembourg	Guy (1340 † 1371) Count of Ligny; Count of Saint-Pol
Wenceslaus IV (1361 † 1419) King of the Romans; King of Bohemia	Sigismund (1368 † 1437) Holy Roman Emperor; King of Bohemia and Hungary	John (1370 † 1396) Duke of Görlitz	Jobst (1351 † 1411) King of the Romans; Margrave of Moravia and Brandenburg	Waleran III (1356 † 1415) Count of Ligny and of Saint-Pol	John (1370 † 1397) Lord of Beauvoir; Count of Brienne
Albert II of Habsburg; Duke of Austria; King of the Romans; King of Hungary, Croatia, Bohemia	Elizabeth of Luxembourg (1409 † 1442)	Elisabeth (1390 † 1453) Duchess of Luxembourg, sold duchy to the Dukes of Burgundy	Peter (1390 † 1433) Count of Saint-Pol and Ligny m. Margaret of Baux	John II (1392 † 1441) Count of Ligny
Elizabeth of Austria (1436 † 1505); Queen consort of Poland, Grand Duchess consort of Lithuania, from her descends the Kings of Bohemia and Hungary to 1918 and Kings of Poland, 1458-1668	Ladislaus the Posthumous (1440 † 1457) King of Hungary and Bohemia, Archduke of Austria	Louis (1418 † 1475) Count of Saint-Pol and Ligny	Thibaud († 1477) Lord of Fiennes, Count of Brienne, Bishop of Le Mans	Jacqueline "Jacquetta" of Luxembourg (1415/1416 – 1472); 1m. John of Lancaster, 1st Duke of Bedford; 2m. Richard Woodville, 1st Earl Rivers, one daughter was
Peter II (c. 1440 † 1482) Count of Saint-Pol	Anthony I (1450–1519); Count of Ligny from here descends the Dukes of Piney-Luxembourg in France	Jacques († 1487) Lord of Fiennes and Gavre	Elizabeth Woodville (c. 1437[1] – 1492); Queen consort of Edward IV of England from here descends the Houses of Tudor, Stuart, and the Royal Family of the United Kingdom

=== Earlier Luxembourg counts ===
The royal House of Luxemburg are named after their ancestors in the Luxembourg branch of the earlier House of Ardenne (or Ardennes, French Maison d'Ardenne). This was an important noble family from Lotharingia, known from at least the tenth century. They had several important branches, descended from several brothers:

- The House of Ardenne–Luxembourg, including the counts of Luxembourg, descended from Count Sigfried of Luxembourg
- The House of Ardenne–Verdun, with several dukes of Lower Lotharingia, descended from Count Gozlin of Bidgau
- The House of Ardenne–Bar, with several dukes of Upper Lotharingia, descended from Duke Frederick I of Upper Lorraine.

The Luxembourg ancestry of Henry V, count of Luxembourg, ancestor of the royal house of Luxembourg

Sigfried (†998), count of the Ardennes, ruler of "Lucilinburhuc"
Frederick I (†1019), count of Luxembourg and Salm
Giselbert (†1059), count of Luxemburg	Frederick, Duke of Lower Lorraine, (†1065), count of Limburg
Conrad I (†1086), count of Luxemburg	Jutta
Henry III (†1086), count of Luxembourg	William (†1131), count of Luxembourg	Ermesinde (†1143)	Godfrey I, Count of Namur (†1139)	Henry I, count of Limburg, († 1106), Duke of Lower Lorraine
Conrad II (†1136), count of Luxembourg	Waleran Paganus, Duke of Limburg (†1139)
Henri IV (†1196), "the blind" count of Namur and Luxembourg	Henry II, Duke of Limburg (†1167)
Henry III, Duke of Limburg (†1221)
Theobald I, Count of Bar	Ermesinde of Luxembourg (†1247)	Waleran III, Duke of Limburg (†1226)
Henry V (†1281), count of Luxembourg, Arlon and Namur

== See also ==
- Jacquetta of Luxembourg
