= Ermesinde, Countess of Luxembourg =

Ermesinde

Countess of Luxembourg
- Reign: 1197 – 12 February 1247
- Predecessor: Otto I
- Successor: Henry V
- Born: July 1186
- Died: 12 February 1247 (aged 60–61)
- Burial: Abbey of Notre-Dame de Clairefontaine, Arlon
- Spouse: Theobald I, Count of Bar (m. 1197 - 1214; his death); Waleran III, Duke of Limburg (m. 1214 - 1226; his death)
- Issue more...: Henry V, Count of Luxembourg; Gerard I, Count of Durbuy
- House: House of Namur
- Father: Henry IV, Count of Luxembourg
- Mother: Agnes of Guelders

Ermesinde (July 1186 – 12 February 1247) ruled as the countess of Luxembourg from 1197 until her death. She was the only child of Count Henry IV and his second wife Agnes of Guelders.

== Succession ==
Prior to her birth, Ermesinde's aging father, Count Henry IV of Luxembourg, had recognized his nephew Count Baldwin V of Hainaut as his heir presumptive. However, the 74-year-old count reunited with his estranged wife, Agnes of Guelders, and fathered a daughter, Ermesinde, who displaced Baldwin as heir presumptive. Upon Henry's death in 1196, a war of succession took place. At its end, it was decided that Henry's fiefs would be split: Baldwin would have Namur, Ermesinde would have Durbuy and La Roche, and Luxembourg would revert to their common liege, Emperor Henry VI, who then gave it to his brother Otto.

== Dynastic connections ==
Selected relations of Ermesinde

Carolingian	House of Namur	House of Ardenne
Gozlin, Count of Bidgau and Methingau	Frederic I Duke of Upper Lotharingia	Count Sigfried
Ancestor of the Counts of Bar, Counts of Arlon [ fr ]
Charles, Duke of Lower Lorraine	Robert of Namur (died 981)	Godfrey the Captive; Margrave of Antwerp
Ermengarde	Albert I, Count of Namur	Gozelon, Duke of Lower Lotharingia	Count Frederic
Albert II, Count of Namur	Regelinde	Gilbert, Count of Luxembourg
Henry I of Durbuy	Albert III, Count of Namur	Ida	Frederic, Duke of Lower Lotharingia	Conrad, Count of Luxembourg
Male line ended	House of Limburg; Ancestor of Dukes of Limbourg, Counts of Arlon
Henry I of La Roche
Male line ended	Godefrid, Count of Namur	Ermensinde of Luxembourg	Male line ended
Henry the Blind	Alice
Theobald I, Count of Bar	Ermensinde II	Waleran III, Duke of Limburg, Count of Arlon	Cunigunda of Lorraine	Baldwin V Lord of Hainaut, Flanders and Namur
House of Luxembourg; Counts of Luxembourg and Arlon	Dukes of Limbourg	Lords of Hainaut, Flanders and Namur; Latin emperors of Constantinople

== Rule ==
Ermesinde was initially betrothed to Count Henry II of Champagne, but the engagement was cancelled in 1189. Instead her first husband was Count Theobald I of Bar. He successfully negotiated with Count Philip I of Namur and his brother Count Baldwin IX of Flanders for renunciation of Luxembourg, thus making Theobald and Ermesinde the count and countess of Luxembourg.

When Theobald died in 1214, Ermesinde married Count Waleran III of Limburg (1180–1226), with whom she then ruled Luxembourg. In 1223 Ermesinde and Waleran pressed their claim to Namur against Philip II, but were ultimately unsuccessful. After Waleran's death, Ermesinde ruled Luxembourg alone for two decades. She proved to be an effective administrator, granting charters of freedom to several towns and increasing the prosperity of her country.

== Grave ==
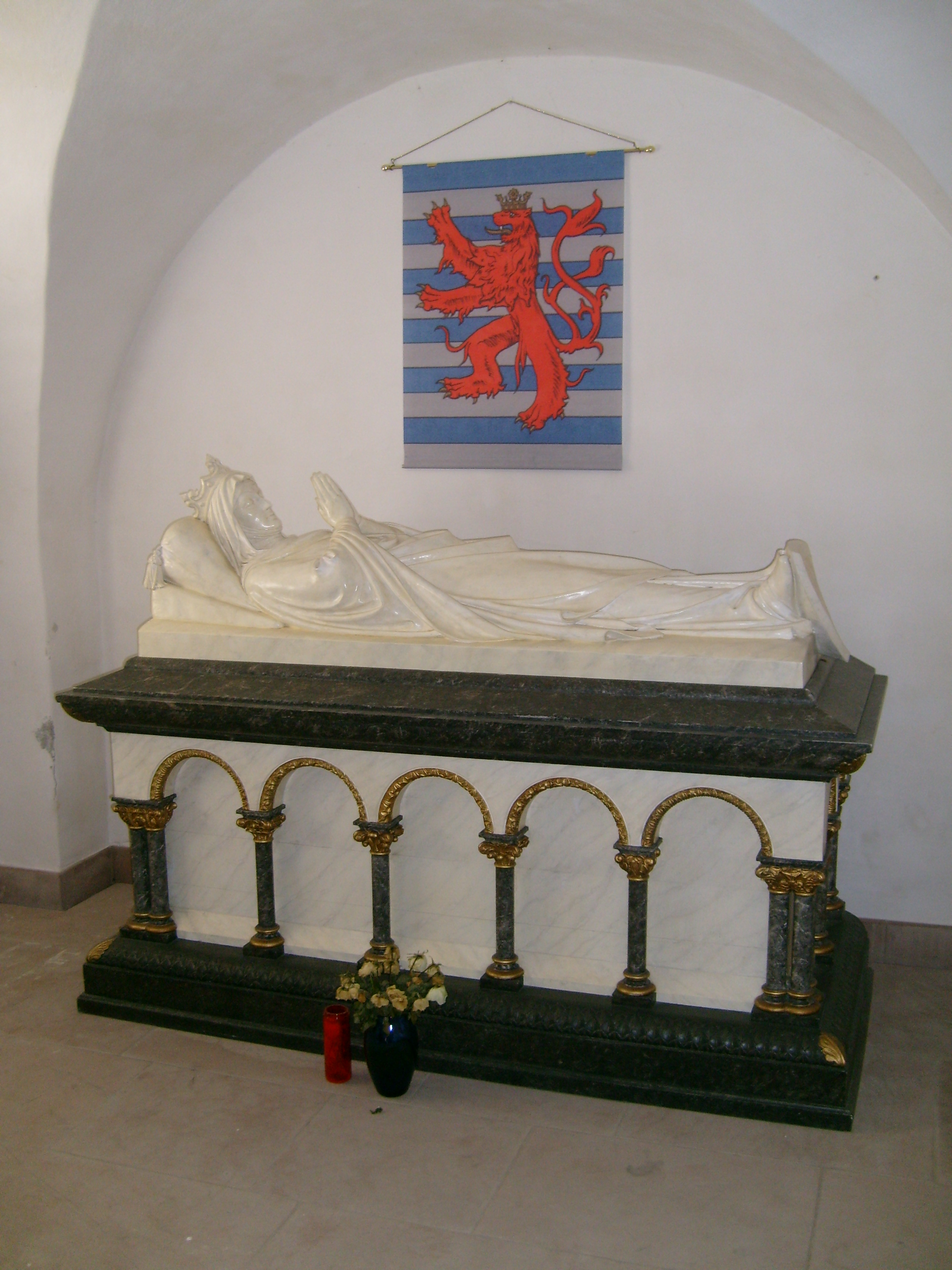
Sarcophagus of Countess Ermesinde

According to legend, Ermesinde saw the Virgin Mary, and planned the construction on that spot of the Clairefontaine Abbey. In her will she asked that she be buried at this location. The abbey was built by her son, Henry V. After many years, the abbey was destroyed in the late 18th century by French troops. In 1747, shortly before the old abbey was destroyed by French troops, the nuns had hidden Ermesinde's remains in a chapel, where they were found by the Jesuits during 1875-1877 reconstructions. The remains are now in the crypt of the chapel of Clairefontaine.

== Children ==
The children of Ermesinde and her first husband, Theobald I of Bar, were:

- Renaud (died before 1214), Seigneur of Briey
- Elisabeth (died 1262), married Valéran of Limburg, Lord of Monschau
- Margaret (d?), first married Hugh III, Count of Vaudémont (died 1243); later married Henry of Bois, regent of Vaudémont.

The children of Ermesinde and Waleran III, Count of Limburg were:

- Henry V of Luxembourg (1216–1281), Count of Luxembourg
- Gérard I of Durbuy, Count of Durbuy (died 1276)
- Catherine of Limburg (died 1255), wife of Matthias II, Duke of Lorraine

Ermesinde, Countess of Luxembourg House of Namur Born: 1186 Died: 12 February 1247
Preceded by Otto	Countess of Luxembourg; 1197–1247	Succeeded by Henry V
