= County of Luxembourg =

State of the Holy Roman Empire

County of Luxembourg Grofschaft Lëtzebuerg (Luxembourgish) Grafschaft Luxemburg (German) Comté de Luxembourg (French) Comitatus Luxemburgensis (Latin)
- 963–1353
- Coat of arms

- Luxembourg within the Low Countries, 1350
- Status: State of the Holy Roman Empire
- Capital: Luxembourg
- Common languages: Luxembourgish; German; French
- Religion: Roman Catholicism
- Government: Feudal monarchy
- Count of Luxembourg
  - 963-998: Siegfried, Count of the Ardennes (first)
  - 1346–1353: Charles IV (last)
- Historical era: Middle Ages
  - Obtained by Sigfried: 963
  - Acquired by House of Ardenne–Luxembourg: 1059
  - Raised to county: 1214
  - Raised to duchy by the Emperor: 1353
  - Held by the Dukes of Burgundy: 1443
  - To Habsburg: 1482
  - Occupied by France: 1797
  - Grand Duchy re-established: 1815
| Preceded by | Succeeded by |
| Duchy of Lower Lorraine | Duchy of Luxembourg |
- Today part of: Luxembourg; Belgium; Germany; France

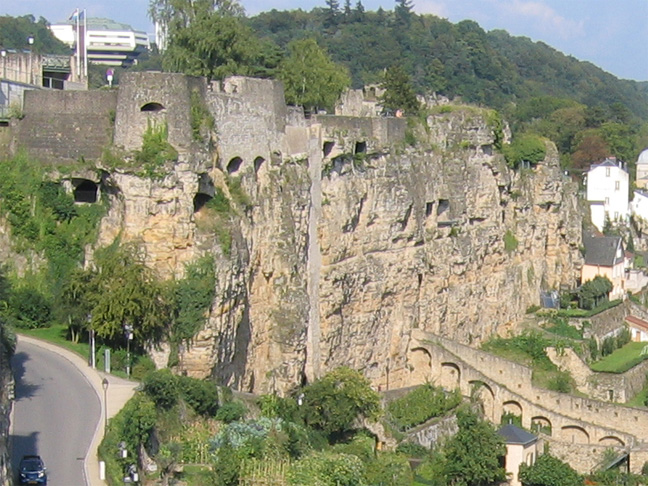
Bock Fiels, Luxembourg

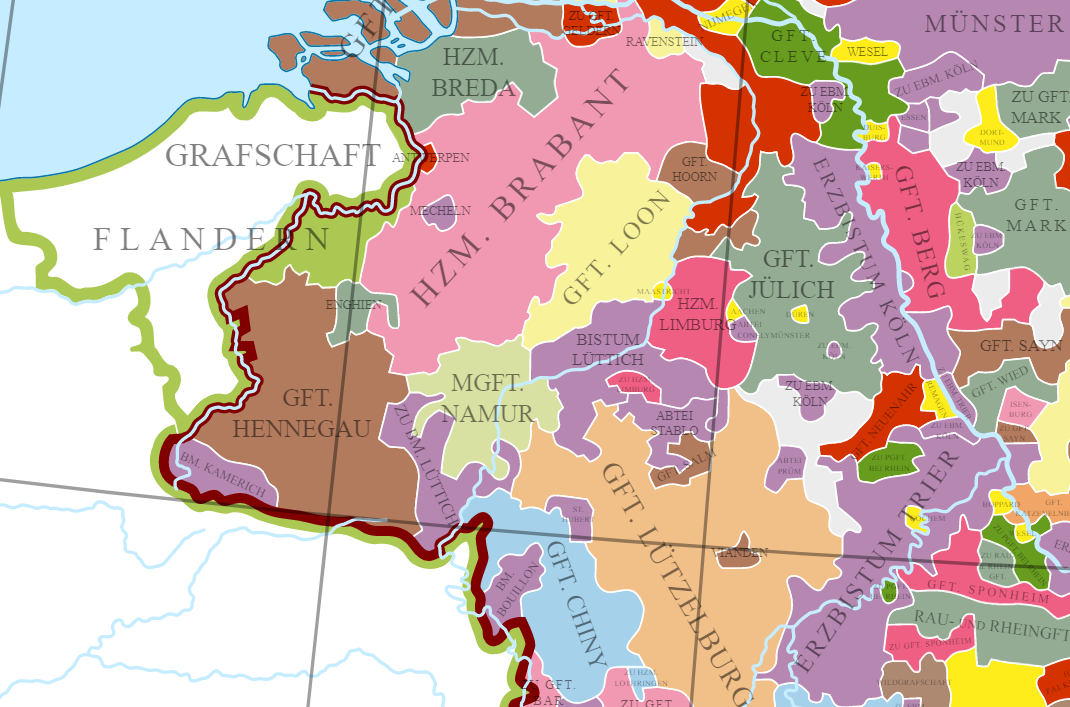
Lützelburg territory (orange) about 1250

The County of Luxembourg (French: Luxembourg; Luxembourgish: Lëtzebuerg) was a State of the Holy Roman Empire. It arose from medieval Lucilinburhuc ("Little Fortress") Castle in the present-day City of Luxembourg, purchased by Siegfried, Count of the Ardennes in 963. His descendants of the Ardenne–Luxembourg dynasty began to call themselves Counts of Luxembourg from the 11th century onwards. The House of Luxembourg, a cadet branch of the Dukes of Limburg, became one of the most important political forces of the 14th century, contending with the House of Habsburg for supremacy in the Holy Roman Empire.

== History ==
The historic region of Luxembourg was settled by Celtic tribes in the 2nd Century BC. After the conquests of Julius Caesar during the Gallic Wars from 58 to 51 BC, it was incorporated into the Roman province of Germania Inferior. Upon the invasion of Germanic Franks from the East during the Migration Period in the 5th century, the Luxembourg region became part of Francia and the Carolingian Empire. In 843, Luxembourg became part of Middle Francia (Treaty of Verdun), then Lotharingia in 855 (Treaty of Prüm) and, finally, of Upper Lorraine in 959. Since 925, it has belonged to East Francia, predecessor of the Kingdom of Germany and the Holy Roman Empire, and large parts were held by the Abbey of Echternach.

From the Early Middle Ages to the Renaissance, authors attributed different names to Luxembourg, such as: Lucilinburhuc, Lutzburg, Lützelburg, Luccelemburc, Lichtburg. The name is usually translated from the Latin as "little castle". However, modern historians believe that the etymology of the word Luxembourg is a derivation of the word Letze, meaning fortification, which might have referred to either the remains of a Roman watchtower or to a primitive refuge of the Early Middle Ages. The first known reference to the territory was by Julius Caesar in his Commentaries on the Gallic War.

== County ==
The ruined, supposedly Roman, fortification called Lucilinburhuc was first mentioned in 963, when Count Siegfried acquired it from Wikerus, Abbot of St. Maximin's Abbey in Trier. Siegfried first appeared about 950. He was possibly a son of Gilbert, Duke of Lorraine, and his mother Cunigunda was a granddaughter of the West Frankish King Louis the Stammerer. In the following years, Siegfried built a new castle on the site of the ruins, on a rock later called "Bockfiels". The castle dominated a stretch of the old Roman road linking Reims, Arlon and Trier that provided prospects for trade and taxation. Although the history of Luxembourg began with the castle's construction, it seems that Siegfried and his immediate successors did not make the castle their primary residence.

During the following years, a small town and market grew around the new castle. Its first inhabitants were probably servants of Count Siegfried and clergy of Saint Michael's Church. The settlement soon received additional protection by the construction of a partial city wall and moat. In addition to the small town near the Bockfiels and the Roman road, a further settlement was established in the Alzette Valley, today the Grund quarter of Luxembourg.

By 1060 the fortress had been extended by Siegfried's descendants. Conrad I (d. 1086) was the first to call himself a "Count of Luxembourg". His son, Henry III, was the first count known to have established his permanent residence there, as in a 1089 document, he is referred to as "comes Henricus de Lutzeleburg". By 1083, this lower town contained two churches and bridges over the Alzette and Petruss rivers. Its inhabitants' occupations included fishing, baking, and milling. In the same year, the Benedictine abbey of Altmünster was founded on the hill behind the castle by Conrad I, Count of Luxembourg.

In 1136 when Count Conrad II of Luxembourg died without heirs, the Ardennes–Luxembourg branch became extinct and the county, by order of Emperor Lothair II, passed to Conrad's maternal cousin Henry the Blind from the House of Namur. When Henry the Blind died in 1196, Count Otto I of Burgundy (a son of the Hohenstaufen emperor Frederick Barbarossa) raised claims to the throne. Henry the Blind's daughter, Ermesinde, married Count Theobald I of Bar, thus securing her own succession as Countess of Luxembourg.

The town of Luxembourg became the centre of a state of strategic value in the Low Countries. Its fortifications were steadily enlarged and strengthened over the years by successive owners, which made it one of the strongest fortresses in Europe. Through its formidable defences it became known as the "Gibraltar of the North". The Luxembourg counts lost the Limburg heritage when they were defeated by the Dukes of Brabant in the 1288 Battle of Worringen. Nevertheless, Count Henry VII, whose father Henry VI had been killed in battle, settled the quarrel by marrying Margaret of Brabant in 1292. In 1308, he was elected King of the Romans and was crowned Holy Roman Emperor in 1312, the first of three emperors provided by the House of Luxembourg. His son, John the Blind, became King of Bohemia in 1310, whereafter the dynasty moved their seat of power to Prague Castle.

== Elevation ==
The Duchy of Luxembourg was formed when the counties of Luxembourg, Durbuy, Laroche and Vianden (a vassal county since 31 July 1264), the Marquisat of Arlon, and the districts of Thionville, Bitburg and Marville were combined. Luxembourg was an independent fief of the Holy Roman Empire until 1353, when the Luxembourg Emperor Charles IV elevated it to the status of a duchy for his half-brother, Wenceslaus I, Duke of Luxembourg.

Upon the extinction of the Luxembourg dynasty, the duchy passed to the House of Valois-Burgundy in 1443, and then to the Archduchy of Austria in 1482. It was integrated into the Burgundian Circle of the Holy Roman Empire, by Emperor Charles V in the Pragmatic Sanction of 1549. During the French Revolutionary Wars, Luxembourg was annexed to the department of Forêts. Following agreement at the 1815 Congress of Vienna, some of the former duchy's territory became the Grand Duchy of Luxembourg under the rule of, but not part of, the Kingdom of the Netherlands, after which it joined the German Confederation.
