= House of Namur =

The House of Namur was a Lotharingian noble family, coming from Berengar, count of the Lommegau. He later became Count of Namur, when the county of Lommegau was renamed to the County of Namur. He married a sister of Giselbert, Duke of Lotharingia, from the House of Reginar.

Coat of arms of the Count of Namur.

Vita Gerardi abbatis Broniensis states that the descendants of Berengar continued to hold the county of Namur, but the relationship between Berengar and his successor Robert I is not known. Some think that Robert is a grandson of Berengar by his mother, others speak of a nephew.

His son Albert I, Count of Namur, was father of Albert II, Count of Namur. The latter gave Durbuy to his second son and Namur to his first son Albert III, Count of Namur, who married Ida from the House of Billung, heiress of La Roche-en-Ardenne. His son Godfrey I, Count of Namur married Ermesinde from the House of Ardennes-Luxembourg, daughter of Conrad I, Count of Luxembourg.

Son of the above was Henry the Blind, Count of Namur, La Roche, Durbuy and, as Henry IV, of Luxembourg. His daughter Ermesinde inherited the counties of La Roche, Durbuy and Luxembourg, while his nephew Baldwin V, Count of Hainaut inherited Namur.

Henry IV the Blind, the last male member of the House, died in 1196. Ermesinde married Waleran III, Duke of Limburg; thus the County of Luxembourg, from the House of Ardennes, passed through Ermesinde of Namur to the House of Limburg (a parent house of the House of Luxembourg).

== Sources ==
- Maison de Namur

== See also ==
- Namur
- List of counts and margraves of Namur
