= List of Luxembourgish consorts =

The consort is the spouse of a reigning Grand Duke of Luxembourg. The consort of the current monarch is Stéphanie, Grand Duchess of Luxembourg.

== Countess consort of Luxembourg ==
=== House of Luxembourg-Ardennes (963–1136) ===
Picture	Name	Father	Birth	Marriage	Became Consort	Ceased to be Consort	Death	Spouse
	Hedwig of Nordgau	Eberhard IV, Count of Nordgau (Conradine)	937	950	963 county established	13 December 992		Siegfried I
	Ermentrude, Countess of Gleiberg	c. 965	964	after 985/990		21 February 965		Frederick I
	Clementia of Aquitaine	William VII, Duke of Aquitaine (Ramnulfids)	1060	1075		8 August 1086 husband's death	4 January 1142	Conrad I
	Mathilde of Northeim	Kuno of Northeim, Count of Beichlingen (Northeim)	c. 1080	1105		after 1120		William I
	Ermengarde, Countess of Zutphen	Otto II, Count of Zutphen	c. 1091	1134		1136 husband's death	1138	Conrad II

=== House of Luxembourg-Namur (1136–1196) ===
Picture	Name	Father	Birth	Marriage	Became Consort	Ceased to be Consort	Death	Spouse
	Laurette of Flanders	Thierry, Count of Flanders (Metz)	1130	1152/59		1163 divorce	1175	Henry IV
	Agnes of Guelders	Henry I, Count of Guelders (Wassenberg)	1155	1168/1171		24 August 1196 husband's death	after August 1196	Henry IV

=== House of Hohenstaufen (1196–1197) ===
Picture	Name	Father	Birth	Marriage	Became Consort	Ceased to be Consort	Death	Spouse
	Margaret, Countess of Blois	Theobald V, Count of Blois (Blois)	c. 1170	1190	14 August 1196 husband's accession	1197 county returned to the Luxembourg dynasty	12 July 1230	Otto

=== House of Luxembourg-Namur (1197–1247) ===
None

=== House of Luxembourg-Limburg (1247–1354) ===
Picture	Name	Father	Birth	Marriage	Became Consort	Ceased to be Consort	Death	Spouse
	Margaret of Bar	Henry II, Count of Bar (Bar)	1220	4 June 1240	12 February 1247 husband's accession	23 November 1275		Henry V
	Beatrice of Avesnes	Baldwin, Lord of Beaumont (Avesnes)	1242	by 22 May 1265	24 December 1281 husband's accession	5 June 1288 husband's death	1 March 1321	Henry VI
	Margaret of Brabant	John I, Duke of Brabant (Leuven)	4 October 1276	9 July 1292		14 December 1311		Henry VII
	Elisabeth of Bohemia	Wenceslaus II of Bohemia (Přemyslid)	20 January 1292	1 September 1310	24 August 1313 husband's accession	28 September 1330		John I
	Beatrice of Bourbon	Louis I, Duke of Bourbon (Bourbon)	1320	11 March 1349		26 August 1346 husband's death	27 December 1383	John I
	Blanche of Valois	Charles, Count of Valois (Valois)	1316	23 May 1323	26 August 1346 husband's accession	1 August 1348		Charles I
	Anna of Bavaria	Rudolf II, Duke of Bavaria (Wittelsbach)	26 September 1329	11 March 1349		2 February 1353		Charles I
	Anna of Świdnica	Henry II, Duke of Świdnica (Piast)	1339	27 May 1353		1353 county passed to brother-in-law	11 July 1362	Charles I
	Joanna, Duchess of Brabant	John III, Duke of Brabant (Leuven)	24 June 1322	March 1352	1353 husband's accession	13 March 1354 elevated to duchess	1 November 1406	Wenceslaus I

== Duchess consort of Luxembourg ==
=== House of Luxembourg (1354–1443) ===
Picture	Name	Father	Birth	Marriage	Became Consort	Ceased to be Consort	Death	Spouse
	Joanna, Duchess of Brabant	John III, Duke of Brabant (Leuven)	24 June 1322	March 1352	13 March 1354 elevated from countess	7 December 1383 husband's accession	1 November 1406	Wenceslaus I
	Joanna of Bavaria	Albert I, Duke of Bavaria (Wittelsbach)	1362	29 September 1370	29 November 1378 husband's accession	31 December 1386		Wenceslaus II
	Agnes of Opole	Bolko II of Opole (Piast)	-	1374	1388 husband's ascension	18 January 1411 husband's death	1 April 1413	Jobst

=== House of Valois-Burgundy (1443–1482) ===
Picture	Name	Father	Birth	Marriage	Became Consort	Ceased to be Consort	Death	Spouse
	Isabella of Portugal	John I of Portugal (Aviz)	21 February 1397	7 January 1430	1443 husband's usurpation	15 July 1467 husband's death	17 December 1471	Philip I
	Margaret of York	Richard Plantagenet, 3rd Duke of York (York)	3 May 1446	9 July 1468		5 January 1477 husband's death	23 November 1503	Charles II

=== House of Habsburg (1482–1700) ===
Picture	Name	Father	Birth	Marriage	Became Consort	Ceased to be Consort	Death	Spouse
	Joanna of Castile	Ferdinand II of Aragon (Trastámara)	6 November 1479	20 October 1496		25 September 1506 husband's death	12 April 1555	Philip II
	Isabella of Portugal	Manuel I of Portugal (Aviz)	24 October 1503	11 March 1526		1 May 1539		Charles II
	Mary I of England	Henry VIII of England (Tudor)	18 February 1516	25 July 1554	16 January 1556 husband's ascension	17 November 1558		Philip III
	Elisabeth of Valois	Henry II of France (Valois)	2 April 1545	22 June 1559		3 October 1568		Philip III
	Anna of Austria	Maximilian II, Holy Roman Emperor (Habsburg)	1 November 1549	4 May 1570		26 October 1580		Philip III
	Elisabeth of Bourbon	Henry IV of France (Bourbon)	22 November 1602	25 November 1615	31 March 1621 husband's accession	6 October 1644		Philip IV
	Mariana of Austria	Ferdinand III, Holy Roman Emperor (Habsburg)	24 December 1634	7 October 1649		17 September 1665 husband's death	16 May 1696	Philip IV
	Marie Louise of Orléans	Philippe I, Duke of Orléans (Bourbon-Orléans)	26 March 1662	19 November 1679		12 February 1689		Charles IV
	Maria Anna of Neuburg	Philip William, Elector Palatine (Wittelsbach)	28 October 1667	14 May 1690		1 November 1700 husband's death	16 July 1740	Charles IV

=== House of Bourbon (1700–1712) ===
Picture	Name	Father	Birth	Marriage	Became Consort	Ceased to be Consort	Death	Spouse
	Maria Luisa of Savoy	Victor Amadeus II of Sardinia (Savoy)	17 September 1688	2 November 1701		1712; Luxembourg ceded to Bavaria	14 February 1714	Philip V

=== House of Wittelsbach (1712–1713) ===
Picture	Name	Father	Birth	Marriage	Became Consort	Ceased to be Consort	Death	Spouse
	Theresa Kunegunda Sobieska	John III Sobieski (Sobieski)	4 March 1676	2 January 1695	1712; Luxembourg ceded to husband	11 April 1713; Luxembourg ceded to Austria	10 March 1730	Maximilian Emanuel

=== House of Habsburg (1713–1794) ===
Picture	Name	Father	Birth	Marriage	Became Consort	Ceased to be Consort	Death	Spouse
	Elisabeth Christine of Brunswick-Wolfenbüttel	Louis Rudolph, Duke of Brunswick-Lüneburg (Welf)	28 August 1691	1 August 1708	11 April 1713; Luxembourg ceded to Austria	20 October 1740 husband's death	21 December 1750	Charles V
	Maria Luisa of Spain	Charles III of Spain (Bourbon)	24 November 1745	5 August 1765	20 February 1790 husband's accession	1 March 1792 husband's death	15 May 1792	Leopold
	Maria Theresa of Naples and Sicily	Ferdinand I of the Two Sicilies (Bourbon-Two Sicilies)	6 June 1772	15 September 1790	1 March 1792 husband's accession	1794; Luxembourg occupied by France	13 April 1807	Francis

== Consort of Luxembourgish Grand Duchy ==
=== House of Orange-Nassau (1815–1890) ===
Picture	Name	Coat of Arms	Father	Birth	Marriage	Became Consort	Ceased to be Consort	Death	Spouse
	Wilhelmine of Prussia		Frederick William II of Prussia (Hohenzollern)	18 November 1774	1 October 1791	15 March 1815 husband's accession	12 October 1837		William I (Note: The regnal numbers of the Grand Dukes of Luxembourg ignore previous Luxembourgish monarchs, opting to start with the first Grand Duke of Luxembourg as "William I". Were this not the case, William I would instead be William II, accounting for the existence of William, Count of Luxembourg. John and Henry would also be John III and Henry VIII respectively, rather than the first of their names.)
	Anna Pavlovna of Russia		Paul I of Russia (Holstein-Gottorp-Romanov)	18 January 1795	21 February 1816	7 October 1840 husband's accession	7 March 1849 husband's death	1 March 1865	William II
	Sophie of Württemberg		William I of Württemberg (Württemberg)	17 June 1818	18 June 1839	7 March 1849 husband's accession	3 June 1877		William III
	Emma of Waldeck and Pyrmont		George Victor, Prince of Waldeck and Pyrmont (Waldeck)	2 August 1858	7 January 1879		23 November 1890 husband's death	20 March 1934	William III

=== House of Nassau-Weilburg (1890-1964) ===
Picture	Name	Coat of Arms	Father	Birth	Marriage	Became Consort	Ceased to be Consort	Death	Spouse
	Adelheid-Marie of Anhalt-Dessau		Prince Frederick Augustus of Anhalt-Dessau (Ascania)	25 December 1833	23 April 1851	23 November 1890 husband's accession	17 November 1905 husband's death	24 November 1916	Adolphe
	Marie Anne of Portugal		Miguel I of Portugal (Braganza)	13 July 1861	21 June 1893	17 November 1905 husband's accession	25 February 1912 husband's death	31 July 1942	William IV
	Felix of Bourbon-Parma		Robert I, Duke of Parma (Bourbon-Parma)	28 October 1893	6 November 1919		12 November 1964 wife's abdication	8 April 1970	Charlotte

=== House of Luxembourg-Nassau (since 1964) ===
Picture	Name	Coat of arms	Father	Birth	Marriage	Became Consort	Ceased to be Consort	Death	Spouse
	Joséphine-Charlotte of Belgium		Leopold III of Belgium (Saxe-Coburg and Gotha)	11 October 1927	9 April 1953	12 November 1964 husband's accession	7 October 2000 husband's abdication	10 January 2005	Jean
	María Teresa Mestre y Batista-Falla		José Antonio Mestre y Alvarez	22 March 1956	4/14 February 1981	7 October 2000 husband's accession	3 October 2025 husband's abdication		Henri
	Stéphanie de Lannoy		Philippe de Lannoy (Lannoy)	18 February 1984	19/20 October 2012	3 October 2025 husband's accession			Guillaume V

== See also ==
- List of monarchs of Luxembourg
- List of Nassau consorts
- List of Dutch royal consorts
- Duchess of Limburg

== Footnotes ==
=== Works cited ===
- Gade, John A. (1951). Luxemburg in the Middle Ages. Brill.
