= House of Limburg =

Medieval noble family of Lower Lotharingia

The House of Limburg (in German: Haus Limbourg) was a dynasty which can be traced back in the male line as far as Henry, count of Limburg, whose mother Jutta was heiress of Frederick, Duke of Lower Lorraine in the House of Ardenne–Luxembourg. Henry was also related to the counts of Arlon. Waleran I was probably his father-in-law rather than his father.

By marriage, the family acquired:

- The county of Luxemburg in 1214, which then passed to a younger branch, the House of Luxembourg.
- The county of Berg in 1218.

In 1288, the family lost the duchy of Limburg, which was conquered by John I, duke of Brabant. The elder branch, holding the county of Berg, died out in 1348. The younger branch of Luxembourg acceded to the Empire.

== Genealogy of the House of Limburg ==
Frederick duke of Lower Lorraine, 1st count of Limburg, from the 1st House of Luxembourg (see also House of Luxembourg below)
Udo; Count of Limburg	Jutta daughter of Frederick	Udo of Limburg/Waleran I, count of Arlon? († 1082)
Henry duke of Lower Lorraine, 2nd count of Limburg
Waleran 'Paganus' duke of Lower Lorraine, 3rd count of Limburg	Simon constable of Jerusalem	Conrad I count of Luxembourg; House of Ardennes
Henry II duke of Limburg	Godfey I count of Namur; House of Namur	Ermesinde (House of Ardenne) countess of Luxembοurg
Henry III duke of Limburg	Henry IV count of Luxembourg, count of Namur
∞ 1.Cunigunda of Lorraine	Waleran III duke of Limburg	∞ 2.Ermesinde (House of Namur) countess of Luxembourg
(1) Henry IV duke of Limburg ∞ Irmgard countess of Berg	(2) Henry V count of Luxemburg; House of Luxemburg	(2) Gerard I count of Durbuy
Waleran IV duke of Limburg	Adolf VII count of Berg
Reginald I of Guelders defeated at Battle of Woeringen 1288	Ermengarde of Limburg no children	Adolf VIII count of Berg sold his claim to Brabant	William I count of Berg	Henry lord of Windeck
Adolf IX count of Berg

== Gallery ==
Coat-of-arms of count of Limburg, 1208

Coat-of-arms of Waleran III (the crown indicates the claim to Namur), 1214

coat-of-arms of Waleran III as count of Limburg and Luxemburg (this is indicated by the two tails), in 1221

Counts of Limburg and Berg (lion with two overlapping tails)

== See also ==
- List of rulers of Limburg
- House of Luxembourg

== Sources ==
- Kupper, Jean-Louis (2007), "Les origines du duché de Limbourg-sur-Vesdre", Revue belge de Philologie et d'Histoire Année, 85 (3–4): 609–637, doi:10.3406/rbph.2007.5096
- Gade, John A. (1951). Luxemburg in the Middle Ages. E.J. Brill.
- Loud, Graham A.; Schenk, Jochen, eds. (2017). The Origins of the German Principalities, 1100-1350: Essays by German Historians. Routledge.
- Péporté, P. (2011). Historiography, Collective Memory and Nation-Building in Luxembourg. Brill.
- Gislebertus (of Mons) (2005). Chronicle of Hainaut. Translated by Napran, Laura. The Boydell Press.
- Baldwin, John W. (2002). Aristocratic Life in Medieval France: The Romances of Jean Renart and Gerbert de Montreuil, 1190-1230. The Johns Hopkins University Press.
- Schnerb, Bertrand (2010). "Battle of Steppes". In Rogers, Clifford J. (ed.). The Oxford Encyclopedia of Medieval Warfare and Military Technology. 3. Oxford University Press.
- Droege, G., 'Pfalzgrafschaft, Grafschaften und allodiale Herrschaften zwischen Maas und Rhein in salisch-staufischer Zeit’, Rheinische Vierteljahrsblätter 26 (1961), pp. 1–21.
- Wisplinghoff, E., Zur Reihenfolge der lothringischen Pfalzgrafen am Ende des 11. Jahrhunderts, in Rheinische Vierteljahrsblätter 28 (1963) pp. 290–293.
- Bleicher, W. Contributions in Hohenlimburgher Heimatblätter fűr den Raum Hagen und Isenlohn. Beiträge zur Landeskunde. Monatsschrift des Vereins fűr Orts- und Heimatkunde Hohenlimburg e.V. Drűck Geldsetzer und Schäfer Gmbh. Iserlohn
- Reuter, Timothy, Germany in the Early Middle Ages 800–1056, New York: Longman, 1991.
- Bernhardt, John W. (2002). Itinerant Kingshiop & Royal Monasteries in Early Medieval Germany, c. 936-1075. Cambridge University Press.
- Alfred Noss: Die Münzen von Berg und Jülich-Berg. Band I. Hrsg. Stadt Düsseldorf, Verlag Kress und Hornung, München 1929, S. 2.
