= House of Ardenne–Luxembourg =

Lotharingian noble family

The House of Luxembourg (or Luxembourg), also known as the House of Ardenne–Luxembourg in order to distinguish it from later families, were a Lotharingian noble family known from the tenth and eleventh centuries. They are one of the three main branches of the House of Ardenne, along with the House of Ardenne–Verdun, and the House of Ardenne–Bar.

All these Ardennes families descended from Cunigunda of France, a granddaughter of the West Frankish king Louis the Stammerer, and her husband Wigeric of Lotharingia. The Luxembourg branch descend from their son Sigfried, Count of the Ardennes.

One continuing male-line branches of the House of Luxembourg include the House of Salm. The later House of Limburg, Dukes of Limbourg, whose descendants became Dukes of Luxembourg and a royal dynasty in Germany, descend from the House of Ardennes-Luxembourg through the daughter of Frederick, Duke of Lower Lorraine.

Children of Count Sigfried:

- Siegfried? cited in 985
  - Henry I of Luxembourg
  - Frederick I, Count of Salm and Luxembourg, married Ermentrude of Gleiberg, daughter of Heribert I, Count of Gleiberg and Ermentrud (Imizi). Ancestor of the main known continuing lines...
    - Henry VII (d. 1047), Count of Luxembourg and Duke of Bavaria
    - Frederick, Duke of Lower Lorraine (1003–1065), Duke of Lower Lorraine. Ancestor of the Dukes of Limburg, and the Limburg-Luxemburg dynasty.
    - Giselbert of Luxembourg (1007–1059), Count of Longwy, of Salm, and of Luxembourg, who continued the male line...
      - Conrad I, Count of Luxembourg († 1086)
      - Hermann of Salm († 1088), count of Salm, founder of the House of Salm
      - daughter, married count of Hillesleben
      - daughter, married Kuno, count of Oltingen
      - Adalbéron († 1097 at Antioch), canon at Metz
    - Adalbéron III (d. 1072), Bishop of Metz
    - Thierry of Luxembourg, father of :
      - Thierry (d. 1075)
      - Henry, Count Palatine of Lorraine (d. 1095)
      - Poppon of Metz (d. 1103), Bishop of Metz
    - Hermann of Gleiburg
    - Ogive of Luxembourg (990–1036); married in 1012 to Baldwin IV (980–1035), Count of Flanders
    - Imiza of Luxembourg; married Welf II of Altdorf, Count in Lechrain (d. 1030)
    - Oda of Luxembourg; canoness at Remiremont, then Abbess of Saint-Rémy at Lunéville
  - Gisèle of Luxembourg (1019–after 1058); married Radulfe, Lord of Aalst (d. after 1038); parents of Gilbert de Gant
  - Dietrich II, bishop of Metz, 1006-1047
  - Adalberon, archbishop of Trier 1008-1046
  - Gislebert (d.1004), count in the Moselgau
  - Cunigunda, married Henry II, Holy Roman Emperor
  - Eve, married Gerhard of the Mosel, Count of Metz
  - Ermentrude, abbess
  - Luitgarde, married Arnulf, Count of Holland
  - a daughter, married Thietmar

== Family tree ==
The First House of (Ardenne–) Luxembourg, simplified.

Sigfried († 998) (see above); Count of the Ardennes, ruler of "Lucilinburhuc"
Henry I of Luxemburg; Henry V, Duke of Bavaria († 1026)	Frederick I († 1019); Count of Luxembourg and Salm	Dietrich II bishop of Metz; 1006-1047	Adalberon archbishop of Trier (contested 1008-1046)	Cunigunde; Empress	Henry II, Holy Roman Emperor
Henry VII of Bavaria count of Luxemburg,1026 duke of Bavaria,1042 († 1047)	Giselbert I († 1059) count of Luxemburg	Adalbero III (c. 1010 – 13 November 1072); Bishop of Metz	Frederick; Duke of Lower Lorraine († 1065)
Conrad I († 1086) count of Luxemburg	Hermann of Salm († 1088) count of Salm founder of the House of Salm; German antiking, 1081	Jutta
Henry III († 1086); Count of Luxembourg	William († 1131); Count of Luxembourg	Albert I Count of Dagsburg	Ermesinde († 1143)	Godfrey I Count of Namur	Henry; Duke of Lower Lorraine; Count of Limburg († abt. 1119)
Conrad II († 1136); Count of Luxembourg no children	Counts of Dagsburg; Counts of Loon	Henri IV² († 1196); Count of Namur; Count of Luxembourg	3 generations: Waleran Paganus, Henry II, Henry III
Theobald I, Count of Bar	Ermesinde († 1247)	Waleran III, Duke of Limburg († 1226)
Counts of Bar	Henry V († 1284); Count of Luxembourg; 2nd House of Luxembourg
