= List of monarchs of Luxembourg =

The territory of Luxembourg has been ruled successively by counts, dukes and grand dukes. It was part of the medieval Kingdom of Germany, and later the Holy Roman Empire until it became a sovereign state in 1815.

== Counts of Luxembourg ==
=== House of Ardenne–Luxembourg ===
Portrait	Name	Date of birth	Date of death	Reign	Relationship with predecessor
	Siegfried	922	28 October 998	963 – 28 October 998	
	Henry I	964	27 February 1026	28 October 998 – 27 February 1026	His son
	Henry II	1007	16 October 1047	27 February 1026 – 16 October 1047	His nephew
	Giselbert	1007	14 August 1059	16 October 1047 – 14 August 1059	His brother
	Conrad I	1040	8 August 1086	14 August 1059 – 8 August 1086	His son
	Henry III	1070	1096	8 August 1086 – 1096	His son
	William	1081	1131	1096 – 1131	His brother
	Conrad II	1106	1136	1131 – 1136	His son
	Ermesinde I	1080	1143	1136 – 1136	His aunt

=== House of Luxembourg–Namur ===
Portrait	Name	Date of birth	Date of death	Reign	Relationship with predecessor
	Henry IV the Blind	1112	14 August 1196	1136 – 14 August 1196	Her son

=== House of Hohenstaufen ===
Portrait	Name	Date of birth	Date of death	Reign	Relationship with predecessor
	Otto	June/July 1170	13 January 1200	1196 – 1197	His third-cousin once removed

=== House of Luxembourg–Namur ===
Portrait	Name	Date of birth	Date of death	Reign	Relationship with predecessor
	Ermesinde II	July 1186	12 February 1247	1197 – 12 February 1247	Henry IV's only daughter and Otto's fourth cousin
	Theobald I	1158	13 February 1214	1197 – 13 February 1214	Her first husband and co-ruler
	Waleran	c. 1165	2 July 1226	May 1214 – 2 July 1226	Her second husband and co-ruler

=== House of Luxembourg–Limburg ===
Portrait	Name	Date of birth	Date of death	Reign	Relationship with predecessor
	Henry V the Blond	1216	24 December 1281	12 February 1247 – 24 December 1281	Their son
	Henry VI	1240	5 June 1288	24 December 1281 – 5 June 1288	His son
	Henry VII	1275/1270	24 August 1313	5 June 1288 – 24 August 1313	His son
	John the Blind	10 August 1296	26 August 1346	24 August 1313 – 26 August 1346	His son
	Charles I	14 May 1316	29 November 1378	26 August 1346 – 1353	His son
	Wenceslaus I	25 February 1337	7 December 1383	1353 – 13 March 1354	His brother

== Dukes of Luxembourg ==
In 1354, the county was elevated to a duchy.

=== House of Luxembourg-Limburg ===
Portrait	Name	Date of birth	Date of death	Reign	Relationship with predecessor
	Wenceslaus I	25 February 1337	7 December 1383	13 March 1354 – 7 December 1383	Himself as count
	Wenceslaus II the Lazy	26 February 1361	16 August 1419	7 December 1383 – 1388	His nephew
	Jobst	December 1351	18 January 1411	1388 – 18 January 1411	His cousin
	Elisabeth I	November 1390	2 August 1451	18 January 1411 – 1443	His heiress & first cousin once removed
	Anthony	August 1384	25 October 1415	18 January 1411 – 25 October 1415	Her first husband and co-ruler
	John II the Pitiless	1374	6 January 1425	10 March 1418 – 6 January 1425	Her second husband and co-ruler

As Elisabeth had no surviving children, she sold Luxembourg to Philip the Good, Duke of Burgundy in 1441, but only to succeed upon her death. Philip captured Luxembourg City in 1443, but did not assume the ducal title because of conflicting claims by Anne of Austria, the closest Luxembourg relative.

==== Claimants ====
Portrait	Name	Date of birth	Date of death	Reign	Relationship with predecessor
	Elisabeth I	November 1390	2 August 1451	1443 to 2 August 1451	
	Ladislaus the Posthumous	22 February 1440	23 November 1457	2 August 1451 to 23 November 1457	Her first cousin once removed
	Anne	12 April 1432	13 November 1462	23 November 1457 to 13 November 1462	His sister
	William the Brave	30 April 1425	17 September 1482	23 November 1457 to 13 November 1462	Her husband and co-pretender
	Elisabeth II	1436	30 August 1505	13 November 1462 to 1467	Her sister
	Casimir Jagiellon	30 November 1427	7 June 1492	13 November 1462 to 1467	Her husband and co-pretender
	George of Poděbrady	23 April 1420	22 March 1471	1458 to 1471	Claimed title as king of Bohemia

=== House of Valois-Burgundy ===
In 1467, when Elisabeth II of Austria, last rival claimant to the title, renounced her rights, Philip III's son, Charles the Bold, assumed the title of duke of Luxembourg, making it a subsidiary title of the Duke of Burgundy.

Portrait	Name	Date of birth	Date of death	Reign	Relationship with predecessor
	Philip I "the Good"	31 July 1396	15 June 1467	1443 to 15 June 1467	Elisabeth I's second cousin once removed and "usurper"
	Charles II "the Bold"	10 November 1433	5 January 1477	15 June 1467 to 5 January 1477	His son
	Mary I "the Rich"	13 February 1457	27 March 1482	5 January 1477 to 27 March 1482	His daughter
	Maximilian I "the Last Knight"	22 March 1459	12 January 1519	5 January 1477 to 27 March 1482	Her husband and co-ruler

=== House of Habsburg ===
In 1482, Luxembourg passed to the House of Habsburg. After the abdication of Emperor Charles V, the duchy of Luxembourg fell to the Spanish line of the House of Habsburg.

Portrait	Name	Date of birth	Date of death	Reign	Relationship with predecessor
	Philip II "the Handsome"	22 July 1478	25 September 1506	27 March 1482 to 25 September 1506	Their son
	Charles III "the Golden"	24 February 1500	21 September 1558	25 September 1506 to 16 January 1556	His son
	Philip III "the Prudent"	21 May 1527	13 September 1598	16 January 1556 to 6 May 1598	His son
	Isabella Clara Eugenia	12 August 1566	1 December 1633	6 May 1598 to 13 July 1621	His daughter
	Albert	15 November 1559	13 July 1621	6 May 1598 to 13 July 1621	His son-in-law
	Philip IV "the Great"	8 April 1605	17 September 1665	13 July 1621 to 17 September 1665	Their nephew
	Charles IV "the Bewitched"	6 November 1661	1 November 1700	17 September 1665 to 1 November 1700	His son

During the War of Spanish Succession, 1701–1714, the duchy was disputed between Philip of Anjou, grandson of Louis XIV of France, of the House of Bourbon; and Charles of Austria, son of Leopold I, Holy Roman Emperor, of the House of Habsburg. In 1712, Luxembourg and Namur were ceded to Maximilian II Emanuel, Elector of Bavaria by his French allies, but at the end of the war in 1713 with the Treaty of Utrecht Maximilian Emanuel was restored as Elector of Bavaria. In 1713, the duchy fell to the Austrian branch of the House of Habsburg.

=== House of Bourbon ===
Portrait	Name	Date of birth	Date of death	Reign	Relationship with predecessor
	Philip V Philippe de France	19 December 1683	9 July 1746	1 November 1700 – 1712	His grandnephew

=== House of Wittelsbach ===
Portrait	Name	Date of birth	Date of death	Reign	Relationship with predecessor
	Maximilian II; Maximilian Emanuel Ludwig Maria Joseph Kajetan; Anton Nikolaus Franz; Ignaz Felix	11 July 1662	26 February 1726	1712 – 11 April 1713	His uncle

=== House of Habsburg ===
Portrait	Name	Date of birth	Date of death	Reign	Relationship with predecessor
	Charles V Karl Franz Joseph; Wenceslau Balthasar Johann; Anton Ignatius	1 October 1685	20 October 1740	11 April 1713 – 20 October 1740	His second cousin
	Maria II Theresa; Maria Theresa; Walburga Amalia Christina	13 May 1717	29 November 1780	20 October 1740 – 29 November 1780	His daughter
	Joseph; Joseph Benedikt August; Johannes Anton Michael Adam	13 March 1741	20 February 1790	29 November 1780 to 20 February 1790	Her son
	Leopold; Peter Leopold Joseph; Anton Joachim Pius Gotthard	5 May 1747	1 March 1792	20 February 1790 to 1 March 1792	His brother
	Francis; Francis Joseph Charles	12 February 1768	2 March 1835	1 March 1792 to 1794	His son

Luxembourg was occupied by France between 1794 and 1813. At the Vienna Congress, it was elevated to a grand duchy and given in personal union to William I of the Netherlands.

== Grand Dukes of Luxembourg ==
The Grand Duke of Luxembourg (or Grand Duchess in the case of a female monarch) is the head of state of Luxembourg. Luxembourg is the world's only extant sovereign grand duchy, a status to which Luxembourg was promoted in 1815 upon its unification with the Netherlands under the House of Orange-Nassau.

The Luxembourg constitution defines the grand duke's position:

The grand duke is the head of state, symbol of its unity, and guarantor of national independence. He exercises executive power in accordance with the Constitution and the laws of the country.

Originally, the constitution vested the grand duke with considerable executive power. In practice, however, since the end of the personal union with the Netherlands in 1890, he has usually limited himself to a mostly representative role, acting on the advice of the government. Amendments in 1919 significantly curbed the grand duke's powers, thus codifying two decades of constitutional practice.

=== House of Orange-Nassau ===
Portrait	Name	Date of birth	Date of death	Reign	Relationship with predecessor
	William I (Note: The regnal numbers of the Grand Dukes of Luxembourg ignore previous Luxembourgish monarchs, opting to start with the first Grand Duke of Luxembourg as "William I". Were this not the case, William I, II, III and IV, V would instead be William II, III, IV, V and VI, respectively, accounting for the existence of William, Count of Luxembourg. John and Henry would also be John III and Henry VIII respectively, rather than the first of their names.)	24 August 1772	12 December 1843	15 March 1815 to 7 October 1840	Francis' third cousin and Anne's descendant
	William II	6 December 1792	17 March 1849	7 October 1840 to 17 March 1849	Son
	William III	17 February 1817	23 November 1890	17 March 1849 to 23 November 1890	Son

=== House of Nassau-Weilburg ===
Under the 1783 Nassau Family Pact, those territories of the Nassau family in the Holy Roman Empire at the time of the Pact (Luxembourg and Nassau) were bound by semi-Salic law, which allowed inheritance by females or through the female line only upon extinction of male members of the dynasty. When William III died leaving only his daughter Wilhelmina as an heir, the crown of the Netherlands, not being bound by the family pact, passed to Wilhelmina. However, the crown of Luxembourg passed to a male of another branch of the House of Nassau: Adolphe, the dispossessed Duke of Nassau and head of the branch of Nassau-Weilburg.

In 1905, Grand Duke Adolphe's younger half-brother, Prince Nikolaus Wilhelm of Nassau, died, having left a son Georg Nikolaus, Count von Merenberg who was, however, the product of a morganatic marriage, and therefore not legally a member of the House of Nassau. In 1907, Adolphe's only son, William IV, Grand Duke of Luxembourg, obtained passage of a law confirming the right of his eldest daughter, Marie-Adélaïde, to succeed to the throne in virtue of the absence of any remaining dynastic males of the House of Nassau, as originally stipulated in the Nassau Family Pact. She became the grand duchy's first reigning female monarch upon her father's death in 1912, and upon her own abdication in 1919, was succeeded by her younger sister Charlotte, who married Felix of Bourbon-Parma, a prince of the former Duchy of Parma. Charlotte's descendants have since reigned as the continued dynasty of Nassau.

Name and reign	Portrait	Birth	Marriages	Death	Right of Succession
Adolphe; 23 November 1890 – 17 November 1905		24 July 1817; Wiesbaden (Prussia)	(1) Grand Duchess Elizabeth Mikhailovna of Russia; 31 January 1844 [1 child (stillborn)] (2) Princess Adelheid-Marie of Anhalt-Dessau; 23 April 1851 [5 children]	17 November 1905; Colmar-Berg	William III's; 17th cousin once removed through male line 3rd cousin through William IV, Prince of Orange; Anne's direct descendant
William IV; 17 November 1905 – 25 February 1912		22 April 1852; Wiesbaden (Prussia)	Infanta Marie Anne of Portugal [6 children]	25 February 1912; Colmar-Berg	Eldest child
Marie-Adélaïde; 25 February 1912 – 14 January 1919 (Note: Abdicated.)		14 June 1894; Colmar-Berg	Unmarried [childless]	24 January 1924; Lenggries (Germany)	Eldest daughter
Charlotte; 14 January 1919 – 12 November 1964		23 January 1896; Colmar-Berg	Prince Felix of Bourbon-Parma; 6 November 1919 [6 children]	9 July 1985; Fischbach	Second daughter

=== House of Luxembourg-Nassau ===
The House of Luxembourg-Nassau originated in 1919 with the marriage of Grand Duchess Charlotte, Grand Duchess of Luxembourg (of the House of Nassau‑Weilburg) to Prince Félix of Bourbon‑Parma (of the House of Bourbon-Parma). Their eldest son, Jean, Grand Duke of Luxembourg (born 5 January 1921), succeeded to the throne in 1964, thus establishing the present ruling dynasty. Although the male‑line (agnatic) descent is from Bourbon‑Parma, the dynasty continues to be styled “Luxembourg‑Nassau” to reflect the historic Nassau‑Weilburg legacy maintained through Charlotte and the links with Luxembourg.

Name and reign	Portrait	Birth	Marriages	Death	Right of Succession
Jean; 12 November 1964 – 7 October 2000		5 January 1921; Colmar-Berg	Joséphine-Charlotte of Belgium; 9 April 1953 [5 children]	23 April 2019; Luxembourg City	Eldest child of Charlotte
Henri; 7 October 2000 – 3 October 2025		16 April 1955; Betzdorf	María Teresa Mestre y Batista; 4 February/14 February 1981 [5 children]	Living	Eldest son, second child
Guillaume V 3 October 2025 – present		11 November 1981; Luxembourg City	Stéphanie de Lannoy; 19 October/20 October 2012 [2 children]	Living	Eldest child

== Family tree ==
Family tree of Luxembourgish monarchs
Monarchs of Luxembourg
Titular rulers of Luxembourg (Note: When Luxembourg was part of a larger realm.)

Carolingian dynasty
House of Ardenne
Cunigunda of France♀ (Note: Granddaughter of Louis II of France and great-great-great granddaughter of Charlemagne.)	Wigeric of Lotharingia	Charles of Lorraine (Note: His parents were Louis IV of France, Charlemagne's great grandson, and Gerberga of Saxony, who was the daughter of Henry I of Germany and herself a great-great granddaughter of Charlemagne through her grandmother Hedwig of Babenberg.)
House of Namur
Siegfried r. 963–998	Ermengarde♀	Albert I of Namur
Henry I r. 998–1026	Henry II r. 1026–1047	Giselbert r. 1047–1059	Albert II of Namur
Conrad I r. 1059–1086	Albert III of Namur	Hedwige♀
Henry III r. 1086–1096	William r. 1096–1131	Ermesinde I ♀ r. 1136	Godfrey of Namur	Theodoric II of Lorraine
Conrad II r. 1131–1136	Henry IV; 1136–1196	Simon I of Lorraine
House of Limburg
Theobald; Count of Bar r. 1214–1226	Ermesinde II ♀ r. 1197–1247	Waleran III; Count of Limburg r. 1214–1226	Agatha of Lorraine♀
Henry II of Bar	Beatrice of Burgundy♀
Margaret of Bar♀	Henry V r. 1247–1281	Otto r. 1196–1197
Henry VI r. 1281–1288
Henry VII; Holy Roman Emperor r. 1288–1313
John; King of Bohemia r. 1313–1346
House of Valois
Charles IV; Holy Roman Emperor r. 1346–1353	Wenceslaus r. 1353–1383	Wenceslaus (II); King of Germany r. 1383–1388	John Henry	Bonne♀	John II of France
Emperor Sigismund	John of Görlitz	Jobst; King of Germany r. 1388–1411	Philip II of Burgundy
Elizabeth♀	Anthony r. 1411–1415	Elizabeth I♀ r. 1411–1443/1451	John (II) r. 1418–1425	John I of Burgundy
Ladislaus r. 1451–1457	Anne r. 1457–1462	Elizabeth II r. 1462–1467	Philip III; Duke of Burgundy r. 1443–1467
Margaret of Thuringia♀	Charles; Duke of Burgundy r. 1467–1477
House of Habsburg
Joachim I of Brandenburg	Maximilian I Holy Roman Emperor r. 1477–1482	Mary♀ Duchess of Burgundy r. 1477–1482
Joachim II of Brandenburg	Philip I King of Spain r. 1482–1506
John George of Brandenburg	Charles V Holy Roman Emperor r. 1506–1556
Joachim III of Brandenburg	Philip II; King of Spain r. 1556–1598
John Sigismund of Brandenburg	Philip III; King of Spain	Isabella; Clara Eugenia♀ r. 1598–1621	Albert VII; Ruler of the Netherlands r. 1598–1621
John William of Brandenburg	Maria Anna♀	Philip IV; King of Spain r. 1621–1665
Hedwig Sophie of Brandenburg♀	Emperor Leopold I	Charles II; King of Spain r. 1665–1700	Maria Theresa of Spain♀	Ferdinand Maria of Bavaria
Charles I of Hesse-Kassel	Charles VI; Holy Roman Emperor r. 1713–1740	Louis; Prince of France	Maria Anna Victoria♀	Maximilian Emanuel r. 1712–1713
Marie Louise of Hesse-Kassel♀	Maria Theresa♀ Holy Roman Empress r. 1740–1780	Philip V King of Spain r. 1700–1712
(Spanish kings)
William IV of Orange	Joseph II; Holy Roman Emperor r. 1780–1790	Leopold II; Holy Roman Emperor r. 1790–1792
Carolina of Nassau-Weilburg♀	William V of Orange	Leopold II; Holy Roman Emperor r. 1792–1806
(Emperors of Austria)
House of Nassau-Weilburg	House of Orange-Nassau
Frederick William of Nassau-Weilburg	William I King of the Netherlands r. 1815–1840
William of Nassau	William II; King of the Netherlands r. 1840–1849
Adolphe r. 1890–1905	Princess Adelheid-Marie of Anhalt-Dessau	William III; King of the Netherlands r. 1849–1890
(Kings of the Netherlands)
William IV r. 1905–1912	Marie Anne of Portugal
House of Bourbon-Parma
Marie-Adélaïde♀ r. 1912–1919	Charlotte♀ r. 1919–1964	Félix of Bourbon-Parma
House of Luxembourg (Note: Officially House of Luxembourg-Nassau.)
Jean r. 1964–2000	Joséphine-Charlotte of Belgium
Henry r. 2000–2025	María Teresa; Mestre y Batista
William V r. 2025–present	Stéphanie de Lannoy
Prince Charles (b. 2020)

== See also ==
- History of Luxembourg
- Coat of arms of Luxembourg
- Duchy of Luxembourg
- House of Luxembourg-Nassau
- Succession to the Luxembourgish throne
- List of Luxembourgish consorts
- List of prime ministers of Luxembourg
