= Frederick of Liege =

French Roman Catholic saint

Saint Frederick

Bishop of Liege
- Died: 1121; Liège, Belgium
- Venerated in: Roman Catholic Church
- Feast: 27 May

Frederick was Bishop of Liege.

Frederick was the son of Albert III, Count of Namur and his wife Ida. His older brother was Godfrey I, Count of Namur.

Godfrey I, Count of Louvain came into conflict with Otbert, Bishop of Liège, over the county of Brunengeruz that both claimed. In 1099, Emperor Henry IV allotted the county to his close supporter, the bishop, who entrusted it to Albert III, Count of Namur. Bishop Otbert died in 1119. Two separate candidates were elected to replace him and Godfrey sided with the loser.

Frederick became Bishop of Liege succeeding Bishop Alexander (who was forced to stand down after being charged with acts of simony, 1119). As a result, the newly appointed Bishop Frederick suffered open animosity from Alexander's supporters. It is believed that Frederick was poisoned by the count of Louvain, and suffered death in 1121.
