= Duchy of Luxembourg =

1353–1797 state of the Holy Roman Empire

Coordinates: 49.61°N 6.13°E

Duchy of Luxembourg Herzogtum Lëtzebuerg (Luxembourgish) Herzogtum Luxemburg (German) Duché de Luxembourg (French)
- 1353–1443/1797
- Flag Coat of arms

- Luxembourg within the Low Countries, 1350
- Status: State of the Holy Roman Empire; Part of the Burgundian Netherlands (1443–1482); Part of the Habsburg Netherlands (1482–1581); Part of the Spanish Netherlands (1581–1714); Part of the Austrian Netherlands (1714–1795)
- Capital: Luxembourg
- Common languages: Luxembourgish; German; French
- Religion: Roman Catholicism
- Government: Feudal Duchy
- Duke of Luxemburg
  - 1353–1383: Wenceslaus I (first)
  - 1415–1419: Elizabeth of Görlitz
  - 1419–1425: John the Fearless
  - 1425–1443: Elizabeth of Gorlitz (last)
  - 1439–1482: William III of Saxony (claimant)
- Historical era: Middle Ages
  - Obtained by Sigfried: 963
  - Acquired by Luxembourg dynasty: 1059
  - Raised to county: 1214
  - Raised to duchy by the Emperor: 1354
  - Held by the Dukes of Burgundy: 1443
  - To Habsburg: 1482
  - Occupied by France: 1797
Preceded by	Succeeded by
County of Luxembourg; Vianden	French First Republic; Burgundian Netherlands

History of the Low Countries (schematic)
Frisii		Germanic tribes		Belgae & Celts			
Frisii	Cana– nefates (Note: Roman foederati)	Chamavi, Tubantes (Note: The Chamavi merged into the confederation of the Franks; the Tubantes merged into the confederation of the Saxons.)		Gallia Belgica (55 BC–c. 5th century AD); Germania Inferior (83–c. 5th century)			
Frisii	Cana– nefates	Salian Franks		Batavi			
unpopulated (4th –c. 5th centuries)		Saxons	Salian Franks (4th–c. 5th centuries)				
Frisian Kingdom (c. 6th century – 734)		Saxons	Frankish Kingdom (481–843)—Carolingian Empire (800–843)				
Frisian Kingdom (c. 6th century – 734)		Austrasia (511–687)					
Middle Francia (843–855)				West; Francia (from 843)	Middle Francia (843–855)		
Kingdom of Lotharingia (Note: Part of East Francia after 939, divided in Upper Lorraine (as part of West Francia) and Lower Lorraine (as part of East Francia) in 959.) (855–959); Duchy of Lower Lorraine (Note: Lower Lorraine—also referred to as Lothier—disintegrated into several smaller independent territories and only the title of a "Duke of Lothier" remained, held by Brabant.) (from 959)			Kingdom of Lotharingia (855–959); Duchy of Lower Lorraine (from 959)	West; Francia (from 843)	Kingdom of Lotharingia (855–959); Duchy of Lower Lorraine (from 959)		
Frisia			Kingdom of Lotharingia (855–959); Duchy of Lower Lorraine (from 959)	County of Flanders (Note: Including County of Artois (part of Flanders until 1237) and Tournaisis.) (862–1384)	Kingdom of Lotharingia (855–959); Duchy of Lower Lorraine (from 959)		
Frisian; Freedom (Note: Lordship of Frisia and Lordship of Groningen (including the Ommelanden) after 1524 and 1536 respectively.) (11th–16th centuries)	County of Holland (Note: Including County of Zeeland, that was ruled by neighboring County of Holland and County of Flanders (until 1432).) (880–1432)	Bishopric of Utrecht (Note: Utrecht included Lordship of Overijssel (until 1528), County of Drenthe (until 1528) and County of Zutphen (until 1182).) (695–1456)	Duchy of Brabant (Note: Duchy of Brabant included since 1288 also the Duchy of Limburg (now part of Belgium's Liège Province) and the "Overmaas" lands Dalhem, Valkenburg and Herzogenrath (now part of the Dutch Province of Limburg).) (1183–1430) Duchy of Guelders (Note: The county, later duchy, of Guelders consisted of four quarters, as they were separated by rivers: situated upstream Upper Quarter (the present day northern half of the Dutch province of Limburg), spatially separated from the three downstream Lower Quarters: County of Zutphen (after 1182), Veluwe Quarter and Nijmegen Quarter. The three lower quarters emerged from the historic gau Hamaland (named after the Chamavi tribe), and formed the present day province of Gelderland. Guelders did not include the Cleves enclave Huissen and the independent counties of Buren and Culemborg, that were much later seceded to the province of Gelderland.) (1046–1543)	County of Flanders (862–1384)	County of Hainaut (1071–1432) County of Namur (981–1421)	Prince- Bishopric of Liège (Note: Throughout the Middle Ages, the bishopric was further expanded with the Duchy of Bouillon in 1096 (ceded to France in 1678), the acquisition of the county of Loon in 1366 and the county of Horne in 1568. The Lordship of Mechelen was also part of the Prince-Bishopric of Liège.)(980–1791)	Duchy of Luxembourg (1059–1443)
Frisian; Freedom (11th–16th centuries)	Burgundian Netherlands (1384–1482)					Prince- Bishopric of Liège (980–1791)	Burgundian Netherlands (1384–1482)
Habsburg Netherlands (1482–1795) (Seventeen Provinces after 1543) (Note: The name Seventeen Provinces came in use after the Habsburg emperor Charles V had re-acquired the Duchy of Guelders, and an continuous territory arose.)						Prince- Bishopric of Liège (980–1791)	Habsburg Netherlands (1482–1795) (Seventeen Provinces after 1543)
Dutch Republic (1581–1795)				Spanish Netherlands (1556–1714)		Prince- Bishopric of Liège (980–1791)	Spanish Netherlands (1556–1714)
Dutch Republic (1581–1795)				Austrian Netherlands (1714–1795)		Prince- Bishopric of Liège (980–1791)	Austrian Netherlands (1714–1795)
Dutch Republic (1581–1795)				United States of Belgium (1790)		Republic of Liège (1789–'91)	United States of Belgium (1790)
Dutch Republic (1581–1795)				Austrian Netherlands (1795–1797)		P.-Bish. of Liège (1791–1794)	Austrian Netherlands (1795–1797)
Batavian Republic (1795–1806); Kingdom of Holland (1806–1810)			associated with French First Republic (1795–1804) part of First French Empire (1804–1815)				
part of First French Empire (1810–1813)			associated with French First Republic (1795–1804) part of First French Empire (1804–1815)				
Sovereign Principality of the Netherlands (1813–1815)			associated with French First Republic (1795–1804) part of First French Empire (1804–1815)				
United Kingdom of the Netherlands (1815–1830)							Grand Duchy of Luxembourg (from 1815)
Kingdom of the Netherlands (from 1839)				Kingdom of Belgium (from 1830)			Grand Duchy of Luxembourg (from 1815)
Kingdom of the Netherlands (from 1839)				Kingdom of Belgium (from 1830)			Grand Duchy of Luxembourg (from 1890)

The Duchy of Luxembourg (French: Luxembourg; German: Luxemburg; Luxembourgish: Lëtzebuerg) was a state of the Holy Roman Empire, the ancestral homeland of the noble House of Luxembourg. The House of Luxembourg became one of the most important political forces in the 14th century, competing against the Houses of Habsburg and Wittelsbach for supremacy in the Holy Roman Empire. They would be the heirs to the Přemyslid dynasty in the Kingdom of Bohemia, succeeding to the Kingdom of Hungary and contributing four Holy Roman Emperors until their own line of male heirs came to an end and the House of Habsburg received the territories that the two Houses had originally agreed upon in the Treaty of Brünn in 1364.

In 1443, the duchy passed to Duke Philip the Good of Burgundy of the French House of Valois, and, in 1477, by marriage to Archduke Maximilian I of Austria of the House of Habsburg. The Seventeen Provinces of the former Burgundian Netherlands were formed into an integral union by Charles V, Holy Roman Emperor in the Pragmatic Sanction of 1549. In 1795, French revolutionaries ended this situation.

== Early history ==
The first known reference to the territory was made by Julius Caesar in his Commentarii de Bello Gallico. The historical region of Luxembourg belonged to the Roman province of Belgica Prima. After the invasion of the Germanic tribes from the East, Luxembourg became part of the Frankish Empire. By the 843 Treaty of Verdun, it became part of the Lotharingian province of Middle Francia. According to the Treaty of Ribemont in 880, it had finally fallen to East Francia.

Modern historians explain the etymology of the word Luxembourg as coming from the word Letze, meaning fortification, which might have referred to either the remains of a Roman watchtower or a primitive refuge of the Early Middle Ages.

== County (963–1353) ==
By the 959 partition of Lotharingia, the Luxembourg region had passed to Frederick I, Duke of Upper Lorraine of the House of Ardenne–Bar, a son of Count Palatine Wigeric of Lotharingia. In 963, Count Siegfried, probably a younger brother of Duke Frederick I, purchased some land from Abbot Wikerus of St. Maximin's Abbey, Trier. This land was centered on a ruined (supposedly Roman) fort by the Old High German name of Lucilinburhuc (commonly translated as "little castle"). In the following years, Count Siegfried had a new castle built on the site of these ruins, on a rock that would later be called Bock Fiels. This castle dominated a stretch of the old Roman road linking Reims, Arlon, and Trier, and opened some prospects for trade and taxation. Despite this new construction, it seems that Siegfried and his immediate successors did not make the castle their primary residence. The history of Luxembourg proper began with the construction of this castle.

In the following years, a small town and market grew around the new castle. The first inhabitants were probably servants of Count Siegfried and clergy of Saint Michael's church. This settlement soon received additional protection by the construction of a first, partial city wall and moat.

In addition to the small town near Bock Fiels and the Roman road, another settlement was formed in the Alzette Valley (today the Grund quarter). By 1083, this lower town contained two churches, two bridges of the rivers Alzette, and Petruss. Its inhabitants pursued various professions, including fishing, baking and milling. That same year, the Benedictine abbey of Altmünster was founded by Count Conrad on the hill behind Luxembourg castle.

Henry III was the first count known to have established his permanent residence in Luxembourg castle. In a document from the year 1089, he is referred to as comes Henricus de Lutzeleburg, which also makes him the first documented count of Luxembourg.

Around this fort, the town gradually developed and became the center of a small, but important state of great strategic value to France, Germany, and the Low Countries. Luxembourg's fortress was steadily enlarged and strengthened over the years by successive owners, making the Fortress of Luxembourg one of the strongest in continental Europe. Its formidable defenses and strategic location caused it to become known as the Gibraltar of the North.

The House of Luxembourg provided several Holy Roman Emperors, kings of Bohemia, and archbishops of Trier and Mainz. From the Early Middle Ages to the Renaissance, Luxembourg bore multiple names, including Lucilinburhuc, Lutzburg, Lützelburg, Luccelemburc, and Lichtburg, among others.

== The Duchy (1353–1797) ==
Luxembourg remained an independent fief (county) of the Holy Roman Empire, when, in 1354, Emperor Charles IV elevated it to the status of a duchy for his brother Wenceslaus. The ducal lands had been formed in 1353 by integration of the old County of Luxembourg, the Marquisate of Arlon, the counties of Durbuy and Laroche, and the districts of Thionville, Bitburg, and Marville. The County of Vianden can also be included as it had been a vassal of the counts and dukes of Luxembourg since about 31 July 1264.

In 1411, Sigismund of Luxembourg lost the duchy to his niece Elisabeth because he defaulted on a loan. Elisabeth later sold the duchy to Philip the Good, duke of Burgundy of the House of Valois-Burgundy, who paid her off in 1444. The dukes of Burgundy had previously acquired a number of other possessions in the Low Countries, including Flanders, Artois, Hainaut, Brabant, Zeeland, Holland, and Namur; Luxembourg and these other Burgundian possessions in the Low Countries are collectively referred to during this period (1384–1482) as the Burgundian Netherlands. The male line of the dukes of Burgundy died out in 1477 when Philip's son Charles the Bold died at the Battle of Nancy, leaving Mary of Burgundy, his only child, as his heiress. After his death, Mary married Archduke Maximilian I of the House of Habsburg, who later became Holy Roman Emperor. The Burgundian Netherlands then came under the rule of the House of Habsburg, beginning the period of the Habsburg Netherlands (1482–1581).

With the abdication in 1556 of Charles V, Holy Roman Emperor (also King of Spain as Charles I), the Habsburg Netherlands passed to his son King Philip II of Spain. During the Dutch Revolt, or Eighty Years War, the seven northern provinces of the Habsburg Netherlands broke away from Spain to form the Dutch Republic in 1581, while the remaining ten southern provinces (including Luxembourg) remained under Spanish rule until 1714. During this time, the remaining southern provinces were referred to as the Spanish Netherlands (or Southern Netherlands, a name that continued under Austrian rule). The War of the Spanish Succession, which was fought after the Spanish Habsburg line died out in 1700, resulted in the Spanish Netherlands coming under the rule of Austria in 1714, thereby beginning the period of the Austrian Netherlands. The area remained under Austrian rule until the French Revolution, when it was taken over by France in 1795. Austria confirmed its loss in the 1797 Treaty of Campo Formio.

== Post-Duchy (1797–present) ==
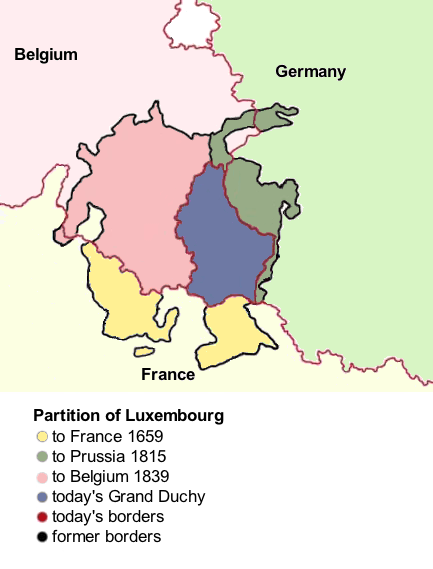
The three partitions greatly reduced the country's territory over the years.

The Southern Netherlands, including Luxemburg, were annexed by the French First Republic on 1 October 1795 and on 24 October the Forêts département was established from the territory of the duchies of Luxemburg and the Bouillon. Centred on Luxembourg City, it lay in what is today Belgium, Luxembourg, and Germany. Its name, meaning "forests", comes from the Ardennes forests.

A small amount of the former Luxemburg territory was ceded to Prussia in 1813.

After Napoleon's defeat in 1814 and the Congress of Vienna in 1815 most of Forêts became part of the United Kingdom of the Netherlands, with the part on the east side of the rivers Our and Sauer becoming part of Prussia (now Germany) to satisfy a dynastic claim. Rather than being integrated into the Netherlands the new Grand Duchy of Luxemburg was established, which was held in a personal union with the Netherlands by King William I. Unlike the Netherlands it became a member of the German Confederation, and a garrison of the Kingdom of Prussia was stationed there.

After the Kingdom of Belgium gained its independence from the Netherlands in 1830, Luxembourg was partitioned in the Treaty of London (1839), with the larger western portion of the grand duchy going to Belgium (as the Province of Luxembourg); only the smaller eastern portion remained part of the grand duchy. The personal union between the Luxembourg and Dutch thrones continued until the death of William III in 1890, at which time the Dutch throne passed to his daughter Wilhelmina while the Luxembourg throne passed to Adolph of Nassau-Weilburg.

The territory of the former Duchy of Luxembourg is today divided between the Grand Duchy of Luxembourg, the Belgian province of Luxembourg, the German Land of Rhineland-Palatinate and the French departments of Ardennes, Meuse and Moselle, the latter part being referred to as French Luxemburg since the 1659 Treaty of the Pyrenees.
