= Henry V of Bavaria =

11th-century Bavarian nobleman

Henry V, Duke of Bavaria
- Count of Luxembourg, Duke of Bavaria
- Died: 1024
- Noble family: House of Ardenne–Luxembourg
- Father: Sigfried, Count of the Ardennes
- Mother: Hedwig of Nordgau

Henry (died 1024), of the House of Ardenne–Luxembourg, was the Count of Luxembourg (as Henry I) from 998 and the Duke of Bavaria (as Henry V) from 1004. He was the son of Siegfried I of Luxembourg and Hedwige of Nordgau.

He was an advocate of the abbeys of Saint-Maximin of Trier and Saint-Willibrord of Echternach, hereditary titles within his family.

In 1004, at the Diet of Ratisbon, he received Bavaria from his brother-in-law, the Emperor Henry II, who was also the Duke of Bavaria. During a quarrel with the emperor concerning the archbishopric of Trier, the duchy was removed from him, but he was reinstated in 1017. He never married and his county passed to his nephew Henry and Bavaria returned to the emperor, then Conrad II, who bestowed it on his son, the later Emperor Henry III.

Henry V of Bavaria Elder House of Luxemburg Died: 1026
Preceded by Siegfried	Count of Luxemburg; 998-1026	Succeeded by Henry II
Preceded by Henry IV	Duke of Bavaria; 1004-1009	Succeeded by Henry IV
Preceded by Henry IV	Duke of Bavaria; 1017-1026	Succeeded by Henry VI
