= Clementia of Aquitaine =

- Countess of Luxembourg; Countess of Guelders
- Born: 1048; Poitiers, France
- Died: 4 January 1130 (aged 81–82)
- Spouse: Conrad I, Count of Luxembourg; Gerard I, Count of Guelders
- Issue: Matilda; Henry III, Count of Luxembourg; Rudolph; Conrad; Adalbero; Ermesinde of Luxembourg, Countess of Namur; William, Count of Luxembourg; Jutta; Yolande
- House: Ramnulfids
- Father: William VII, Duke of Aquitaine
- Mother: Ermensinde de Longwy

Clémence of Aquitaine (1048 – 4 January 1130) was the daughter of Duke William VII of Aquitaine and Ermensinde de Longwy.

== Biography ==
Around 1075 she married Count Conrad I of Luxembourg and together they had:

- Matilda; married Godefrey, Count of Bliesgau.
- Henry III, Count of Luxembourg (1096†)
- Rudolph (1099†); abbot of Saint-Vanne at Verdun
- Conrad
- Adalbero (1098†); Archdeacon of Metz, was traveling to Jerusalem as part of the army of Godfrey of Bouillon, when he was executed by the Turks.
- Ermesinde (1080-1143); married Albert II, count of Egisheim and of Dagsbourg; after his death she married Godfrey I, Count of Namur.
- William I (1081-1131); Count of Luxembourg.

After Conrad's death in 1086, she later married Gerard I, Count of Guelders and together they had at least two daughters:

- Jutta (1093- 23 Jan 1151); married Waleran II, Count of Limburg.
- Yolanda; married Baldwin III, Count of Hainaut.
