= Simon (constable of Jerusalem) =

Simon was the first known constable of Jerusalem. He may have been from the House of Limburg.

He is cited as a witness two royal charters, the first in 1108 and the second in 1115 as Symon ducis filius. He may be identified with the Simontos, referred to by Anna Comnena as an envoy of Baldwin I of Jerusalem to the County of Tripoli to receive Greek ambassadors in 1108, and as a cousin of the king. Together these could imply that he was a son of Henry, Duke of Lower Lorraine and Count of Limburg, and Adelaide, daughter of Botho of Pottenstein, a great-grandson of Eustace I of Boulogne by his maternal grandmother.
