= Henry the Blind =

Count of Luxembourg (c. 1113–1196)

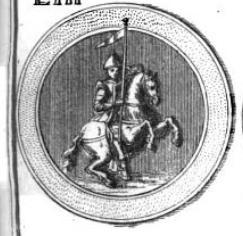
- Born: c. 1113
- Died: 14 August 1196; Echternach
- Noble family: House of Namur
- Spouses: Laurette of Alsace; Agnes of Guelders
- Issue: Ermesinde, Countess of Luxembourg
- Father: Godfrey I, Count of Namur
- Mother: Ermesinde of Luxembourg

Henry the Blind (c. 1113 – 14 August 1196; French: Henri l'Aveugle, Dutch: Hendrik de Blinde), sometimes called Henry IV of Luxembourg, was his father's heir as Count of Namur from 1139 until his abdication in 1189, and heir of his mother's family as Count of Luxembourg from 1136 until his death. He also inherited the smaller lordships of Longwy, La Roche-en-Ardenne and Durbuy.

Henry is an important figure in the history of the southern Netherlands and the modern countries of Belgium and Luxembourg. He is especially important to the history of the county of Namur, where he was the last member of the first line of counts, and the most powerful of them. His important inheritances were divided again after his death, bringing Namur and Luxembourg to different families. His daughter, who was born when he was old, kept Luxembourg and the smaller Ardennes lordships, while descendants of his sister Alice, who were also counts of Flanders and Hainaut, added possession of Namur to their dominion.

Henry lost the use of his eyes in 1182, but was not referred to as "the blind" until much later. Modern historians use that byname in order to distinguish him from a later count, Henry I of Vianden.

== Life ==
Henry was the second known son of Count Godfrey I of Namur and Ermesinde, and a daughter of Count Conrad I of Luxembourg. He was born about 1113. He first appears in the written record in the foundation charter for the abbey of Floreffe in 1121. His elder brother Albert died young, about 1127, leaving Henry as next in line, and he subsequently started being associated with the government of the county of Namur from 1131. In 1136 Henry was active in his father's conflict against Count Godfrey I of Louvain, which followed the death of Anselm, the abbot of Gembloux.

Also in 1136, Conrad II of Luxembourg, a relative of his mother, died. The allodial lands were divided between Henry and his maternal aunt's husband, Henry of Grandpré. Henry of Namur was eventually granted the feudal lordship and advocacies by the Emperor Lothair II, who thus prevented its passing to the French count of Grandpré. He therefore held the advocacies of the abbeys of Saint-Maximin at Trier and Saint-Willibrord at Echternach. After the death of his father in 1139, Henry inherited Namur.

From the 10th to 12th centuries, the counts of Namur had lost power due to the expansionary policy of the neighbouring prince-bishops of Liège, and the uncertainty of comital rights versus those of the emperor. The counts had however successfully accumulated control of some territories in the Ardennes region, which may have been a deliberate policy. The marriage of Henry's parents, whereby his father acquired the succession rights to the county of Luxembourg, has been described as a completion of this family project.

Under Henry's lordship, Luxembourg was joined by several smaller Ardennes possessions which the family had acquired earlier. By 1151, Henry had inherited the lordship of Durbuy from his cousin Henry II of Durbuy. By early 1153 he had inherited the lordship of La Roche-en-Ardenne from another cousin on his father's side, Henry II of La Roche. Together with the lordship over La Roche came the advocacy of the abbey of Stavelot-Malmedy. It has been proposed that Durbuy had come to Henry's grandfather, Albert III of Namur, from his mother's father, Duke Gozelon; and La Roche and the advocacy of Stavelot were part of inheritance of Duke Frederic, ancestor of the dukes of Limburg, which appears to have been split off from the main inheritance and granted to his widow Ida, the mother of Henry's father. Longwy was a personal possession of Henry's mother Ermensinde, who died 1141.

In 1141, after a battle in 1140 at Fosses-la-Ville, a possession of the bishop near Namur, Henry made peace with Bishop Adalbero II of Liège (died 1145), and helped lead his successful military expedition to take Bouillon under the secular control of the bishopric. Despite the improved relationship with the bishop of Liège, in 1142, Henry and the Duke of Brabant supported Count Otto II of Duras, in his dispute with the bishop and the citizens of Sint-Truiden.

In 1147, Henry gave up the advocacy of Saint-Maximin, but he regained it on the death of Albero of Montreuil, archbishop of Trier, in 1152. The new archbishop of Trier, Hillin of Falmagne, exchanged the rights over the abbeys with the town of Grevenmacher in 1155.

Although Félix Rousseau proposed that Henry would have married an earlier wife when he came of age around 1131, there is no record of this. Between 1152 and 1159 he married Laurette (d.1175), daughter of Count Thierry of Flanders and Margaret of Clermont. They separated in 1163. Left without child, he designated his brother-in-law Count Baldwin IV of Hainault, husband of his sister Alice of Namur, as his heir. When Baldwin died in 1171, he designated Baldwin's son Baldwin V. Baldwin V and Henry carried out two wars, in 1170 and 1172, with Duke Henry III of Limburg.

In 1171, Henry married a second time, this time to Agnes, daughter of Count Henry I of Guelders and Agnes of Arnstein. Two years later, in 1173, he sent her back to her father and remained separated from her for 12 years. Following a serious illness, he lost his sight in 1182. In 1184 Henry rejoined with his wife and in July 1186, a girl, Ermesinde, was born to them. This birth called into question the plan of succession, as Henry considered his promise to Baldwin null and void. Henry, then 76 years old, pledged his daughter in marriage to Henry II of Champagne. Baldwin still claimed his inheritance. It was then decided that Baldwin would inherit Namur, Ermesinde would inherit Durbuy and La Roche, and Luxembourg (fief masculin) would revert to the Empire.

The fiefs were dispensed in 1189. After the planned marriage between Ermesinde and the count of Champagne was cancelled, Henry betrothed her instead to Theobald I of Bar. He entered into a war with Henry of Limburg and was defeated on 1 August 1194 at Noville-sur-Mehaigne. He died two years later in Echternach.

== Dynastic connections ==
Selected relations of Henry and his daughter

Carolingian	House of Namur	House of Ardenne
Gozlin, Count of Bidgau and Methingau	Frederic I Duke of Upper Lotharingia	Count Sigfried
Ancestor of the Counts of Bar, Counts of Arlon [ fr ]
Charles, Duke of Lower Lorraine	Robert of Namur (died 981)	Godfrey the Captive; Margrave of Antwerp
Ermengarde	Albert I, Count of Namur	Gozelon, Duke of Lower Lotharingia	Count Frederic
Albert II, Count of Namur	Regelinde	Gilbert, Count of Luxembourg
Henry I of Durbuy	Albert III, Count of Namur	Ida	Frederic, Duke of Lower Lotharingia	Conrad, Count of Luxembourg
Male line ended	House of Limburg; Ancestor of Dukes of Limbourg, Counts of Arlon
Henry I of La Roche
Male line ended	Godefrid, Count of Namur	Ermensinde of Luxembourg	Male line ended
Henry the Blind	Alice
Theobald I, Count of Bar	Ermensinde II	Waleran III, Duke of Limburg, Count of Arlon	Cunigunda of Lorraine	Baldwin V Lord of Hainaut, Flanders and Namur
Counts of Bar	House of Luxembourg; Counts of Luxembourg and Arlon	Dukes of Limbourg	Lords of Hainaut, Flanders and Namur; Latin emperors of Constantinople

== Sources ==
- Gilbert of Mons (2005). Chronicle of Hainaut. Translated by Napran, Laura. Boydell Press. ISBN 9781843831204.
- Gislebert of Mons (1904), Vanderkindere, Léon (ed.), La chronique de Gislebert de Mons, Bruxelles, Kiessling et cie, P. Imbreghts, successeur
- Margue, Michel (2011), "Pouvoirs et espaces comtaux. Le cas des comtés ardennais (Xe – XIIIe siècle)", Revue belge de Philologie et d'Histoire, 89 (2): 507–532, doi:10.3406/rbph.2011.8120
- Rousseau, Félix (1921), Henri l'Aveugle, Comte de Namur et de Luxembourg (1136-1196), Liége: Presses universitaires de Liège, doi:10.4000/books.pulg.1161, hdl:2027/chi.091223235, ISBN 9782821828650
- Rousseau, Félix (1936), Actes des comtes de Namur de la première race 946 - 1196 (PDF)

Henry the Blind House of Namur Died: 14 August 1196
Preceded by Conrad II	Count of Luxembourg; 1136–1196	Succeeded by Otto
Preceded by Godfrey I	Count of Namur; 1139–1189	Succeeded by Baldwin I as margrave
