= Henry VII of Bavaria =

Count of Luxembourg (as Henry II) from 1026 and duke of Bavaria from 1042 until his death

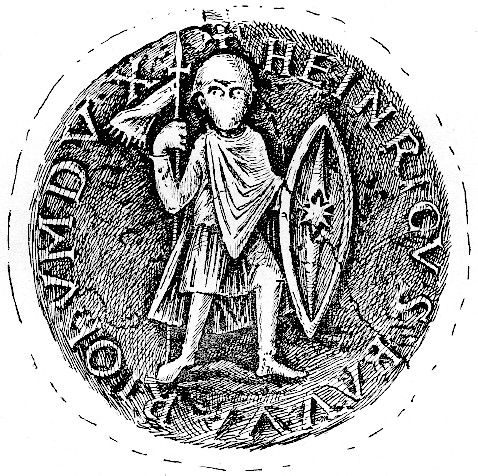
Seal of Henry VII

Henry VII (died 16 October 1047) was the count of Luxembourg (as Henry II) from 1026 and duke of Bavaria from 1042 until his death. He was a son of Frederick of Luxembourg, count of Moselgau, and possibly Ermentrude of Gleiberg.

In 1026, he inherited Luxembourg from his uncle Henry I. This included the advocacy of the abbeys of Saint-Maximin in Trier and Saint-Willibrord in Echternach. He participated in the German–Hungarian War in the summer of 1030. In 1042, he was made Duke of Bavaria by the Emperor Henry III, who had previously held it, but who needed a resident duke to deal with the raids of Samuel Aba, king of Hungary.

He never married. His brother Giselbert succeeded him in Luxembourg, while Bavaria escheated to the emperor, who gave it to Cuno.

Henry VII of Bavaria Elder House of Luxemburg Died: 16 October 1047
Preceded by Henry I	Count of Luxembourg; 1026–1047	Succeeded by Giselbert
Preceded by Henry VI	Duke of Bavaria; 1042–1047	Succeeded by Conrad I
