= Coat of arms of Luxembourg =

Coat of arms of the Grand Duchy of Luxembourg
- Greater (royal) version

Versions
- Middle (state) version

- Lesser version
- Armiger: Guillaume V, Grand Duke of Luxembourg
- Adopted: 1235 current in 1972
- Shield: Barry of ten Argent and Azure, a Lion rampant queue fourchée en sautoir Gules crowned, armed and langued Or.
- Supporters: Two lions reguardant queue fourchée en sautoir Or crowned of the same, armed and langued Gules
- Order: Order of the Oak Crown
- Other elements: The shield is ensigned with the Grand-Ducal crown of Luxembourg. The whole under a Mantle Gules doubled ermine, fringed and tasseled Or, ensigned with the Grand-Ducal Crown

The coat of arms of Luxembourg has its origins in the Middle Ages and was derived from the arms of the Duchy of Limburg, in modern-day Belgium and the Netherlands. In heraldic language, the arms are described as: Barry of ten Argent and Azure, a Lion rampant queue forchée Gules crowned, armed and langued Or.

== Versions ==
There are greater, middle and lesser versions of the coat of arms of Luxembourg. The greater coat of arms has two reguardant and crowned lions as supporters, the Dynastic Order (the Order of the Oak Crown) and all surrounded by ermine mantling crowned with a heraldic royal crown (the crown used by the Grand Duke). The middle coat of arms has the supporters and the crown. The lesser coat of arms has the crown and the escutcheon without external ornaments.

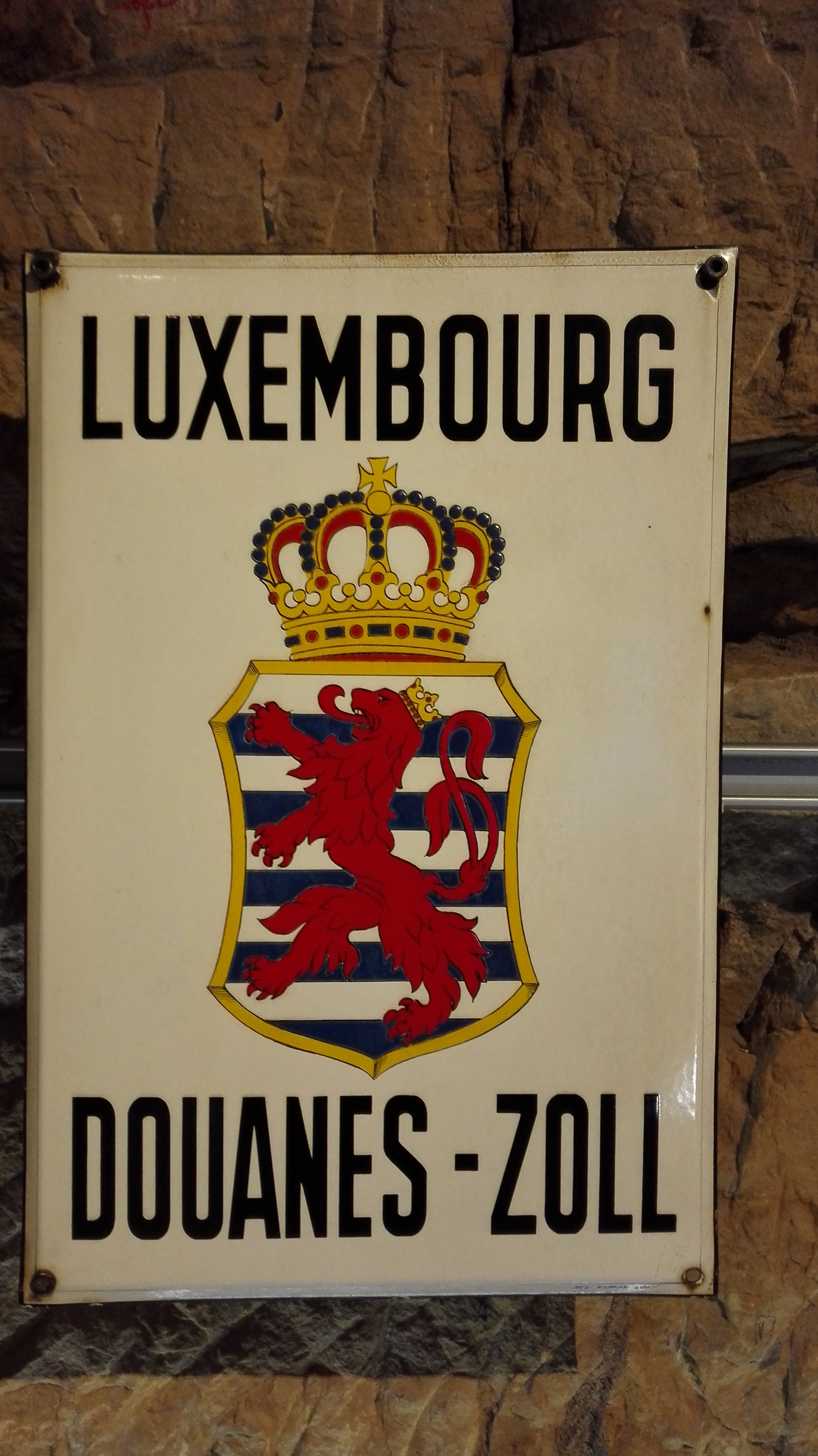
Version used on street signs.

== Arms of the monarch ==
The Grand Duke has a personal coat of arms, the current arms were adopted in 2001: (Note: Arrêté grand-ducal du 23 février 2001 fixant les petites et les moyennes armoiries de Son Altesse Royale le Grand-Duc) (Note: Arrêté grand-ducal du 23 juin 2001 fixant les grandes armoiries de Son Altesse Royale le Grand-Duc)

Quarterly: 1 and 4 Luxembourg, 2 and 3 Nassau (Blazon: Azure billetty Or, a lion or armed and langued Gules). The lesser variant of the arms of the monarch has no external ornaments. The middle variant has the supporters and the crown.

The greater variant has a dynastic inescutcheon with the arms of the House of Bourbon-Parma (Blazon: Azure bordure Gules charged with eight escallops Argent, three fleurs-de-lys Or). The supporters are holding a lance Or, flying the flag of Luxembourg, albeit with a darker tone, identical to the flag of the Netherlands, all surrounded by ermine mantling with the crown. (Note: https://monarchie.lu/en/monarchy/orders-and-coats-arms")

Greater coat of arms of the Grand Duke

Middle coat of arms of the Grand Duke

Lesser coat of arms of the Grand Duke

=== Historical ===
The coat of arms adopted by Grand Duke Adolphe in 1898:

Greater Coat of arms of the Grand Duke

Middle coat of arms of the Grand Duke

Lesser coat of arms of the Grand Duke

These arms were adopted in 1898 by Grand Duke Adolphe and used by him and his successors up until Grand Duke Jean. Upon acceding to the throne in 1964, Grand Duke Jean used the lesser and medium arms as adopted in 1898. The greater arms featuring the former territorial claims attached to the duchy of Nassau that was annexed by Prussia in 1866 were, however, unreflective of political reality of the time and were not used extensively: They were only used on the Great Seal of Grand Duke Jean.

Prior to acceding the throne, Grand Duke Jean made use of the following arms:

1939

1953

=== Arms of the Hereditary Grand Duke ===
The current greater and lesser coats of arms for the Hereditary Grand Duke are currently prescribed by grand-ducal decree of 31 October 2012 and are similar to that of the Grand Duke's with the addition of a gold label on the shield for differencing. In the greater arms, the supporters also do not carry flags. (Note: Arrêté grand-ducal du 31 octobre 2012 fixant les petites et les grandes armoiries de Son Altesse Royale le Grand-Duc Héritier. Mémorial A, number 236, of 9 November 2012)

Greater coat of arms of the Hereditary Grand Duke

Lesser coat of arms of the Hereditary Grand Duke

== The coat of arms of Henry V, Count of Luxembourg (1216–1281) ==
Henry V was the first Count of Luxembourg to adopt these arms (the "Lion of Luxemburg"). His father, Waleran III, Duke of Limburg, bore the arms Argent, a lion rampant queue fourchée gules armed langued and crowned or (white field bearing a red double tailed lion with yellow claws, teeth, tongue and crown), generally known as the "Lion of Limburg". Henry V replaced the field argent (white) with barry argent and azure (a series of alternate white and blue bars, numbering 8 or 10), to difference his arms from his half-brother Henry IV, Duke of Limburg.

It is uncertain what was the origin of this field barry argent and azure. Jean-Claude Loutsch, Luxembourg's most prominent heraldist, suggested the theory that the original Luxembourg dynasties may have borne a barry banner (colours unknown). Two dynasties closely related to the first Houses of Luxembourg also adopted barry coats of arms during this period, namely the Counts of Loon and the Counts of Grandpré bore the arms Barry of ten or and gules (10 yellow and red alternating bars). In such a case, the choice of colour of the bars would have been selected to match the white field and red lion of Limburg.

Coat of arms of Waleran III, Duke of Limburg (Lion of Limburg)

Coat of arms of the Counts of Grandpré and Counts of Loon

Coat of arms of Henry V, Count of Luxembourg (Lion of Luxemburg)

== The coat of arms of Henry VI, Count of Luxembourg (1240-1288) ==
In 1282, after the death of Waleran IV of Limburg, Henry VI, count of Luxembourg changed his arms by doubling the lion's tail and passing it in saltire as a claim on the duchy of Limburg. After Henry VI's death in 1288 at the Battle of Worringen, Henry VII readopted his grandfather Henry V's arms, which remained in use until the extinction of the House of Luxembourg.

Coat of arms of the Dukes of Limburg

Coat of arms of Henry VI, Count of Luxembourg between 1282 and 1288

Coat of arms of the Counts of Luxembourg after 1288

== Lusignan and Stratford ==
The Lusignan coat of arms, granted in the 12th century

The Luxembourg coat of arms between 1282 and 1288 (Henry VI)

The Luxembourg coat of arms after 1288

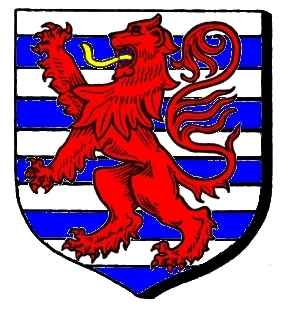
The Stratford type B coat of arms, first recorded in 1543

The Luxembourg Coat of Arms bears a striking similarity to both the arms of Lusignan and of Stratford. The relationship is unknown, if indeed any exists at all although the link between the Lusignan and Luxembourg coat-of-arms is provided in 'Le Roman de Mélusine' by Couldrette whereby a descendant of the legendary founder and faerie queen of Lusignan adopts the burely of 10 argent and azure, adding the lion rampant due to his similarly shaped birthmark. Historians have generated various theories as to the connection between the houses and the arms, none conclusive.

== See also ==
- Flag of Luxembourg
