= Giselbert of Luxembourg =

Count of Salm and Luxembourg

Giselbert of Luxembourg (c. 1007 – 14 August 1059) was Count of Salm and of Longwy, then Count of Luxemburg from 1047 to 1059. He was a son of Frederick of Luxembourg, count of Moselgau, and perhaps of Ermentrude of Gleiberg.

At first count of Salm and of Longwy, on his brother Henry II's death he inherited the County of Luxembourg, as well as providing the income for the abbeys of Saint-Maximin in Trier and Saint-Willibrord in Echternach. He got into an argument with the Archbishop of Trier Poppon as to the abbaye Saint-Maximin, which was arbitrated by his brother Adalbero III, bishop of Metz.

In 1050, since the population of the town of Luxembourg had risen considerably, he expanded the city by building a new fortified wall around it.

By an unknown wife, he had:

- Conrad I, Count of Luxembourg († 1086)
- Hermann of Salm († 1088), count of Salm, founder of the House of Salm
- daughter, married Thierry of Amensleben
- daughter, married Kuno, count of Oltingen
- Adalbéron († 1097 at Antioch), canon at Metz
- Jutta, married Udo of Limbourg
- Rudolph, abbot of Altmünster Abbey

Giselbert of Luxembourg Elder House of Luxemburg Born: 1007 Died: 14 August 1059
Preceded by Henry II	Count of Luxembourg; 1047–1059	Succeeded by Conrad I
