= Altmünster Abbey =

Former Benedictine monastery in Luxembourg City

Coordinates: 49°36′48″N 6°08′33″E

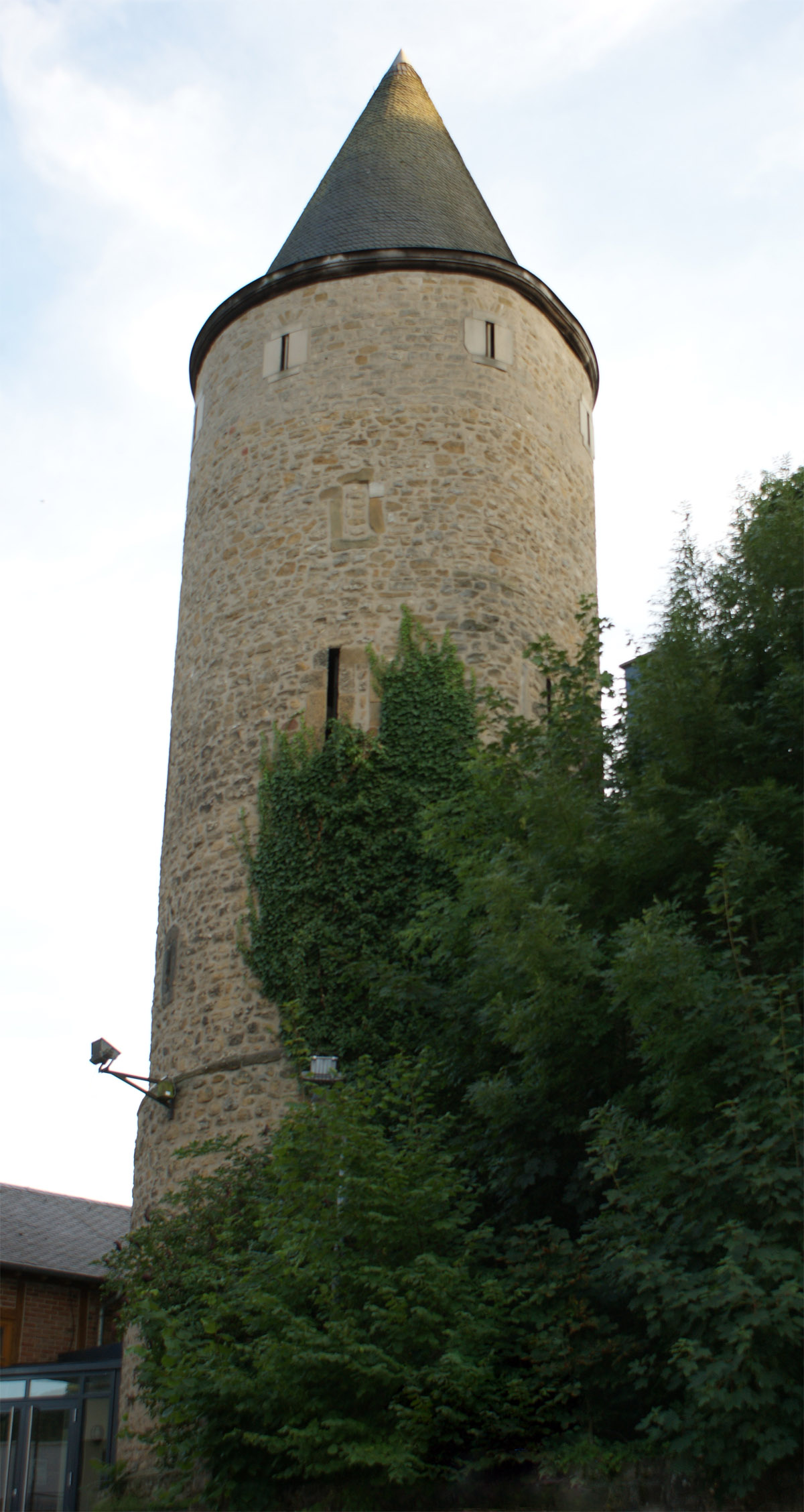
The tower, the only part of the abbey remaining

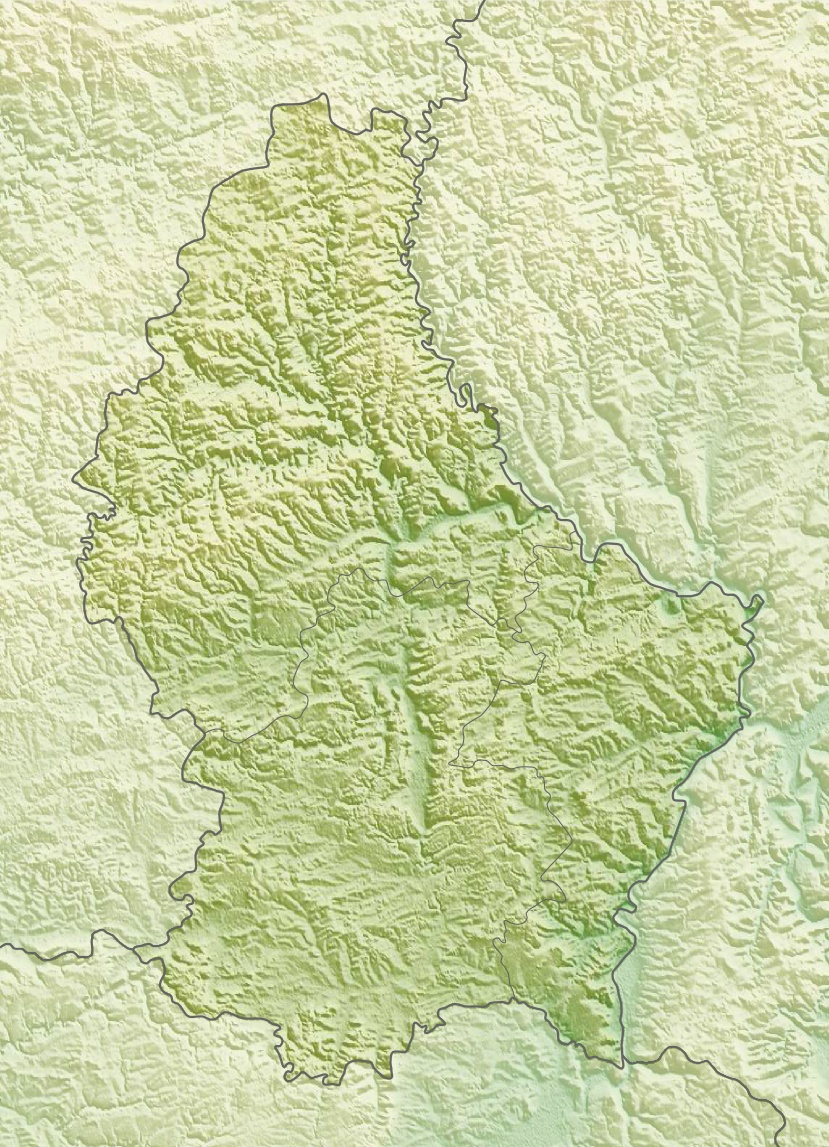
Altmünster Abbey (Luxembourg)

Altmünster Abbey was a Benedictine monastery on the Plateau Altmünster, between the Fishmarket and Clausen areas of Luxembourg City.

== History ==
It was the first Abbey in Luxembourg City-founded in 1083 by Conrad I, Count of Luxembourg as a private monastery and a religious centre of his county. He appointed his brother Rudolph abbot.

The monks came from the abbeys of Saint-Airy and Saint-Vanne in Verdun. Conrad's son, Count William, dedicated the abbey to Our Lady (Notre Dame) in 1123, but to locals it continued to be known as Mënster (German: Münster, meaning a monastery church or any large church building). In this period, the monastery was also put directly under the control of the Pope, so that neither Saint-Vanne nor the secular authorities could interfere with it.

The monastery school later received a monopoly on education in the city of Luxembourg and its catchment area reached up to the County of Bar. The children were taught the French and German languages, amongst other things.

Up until the reign of Henry IV all the Counts of Luxembourg were buried here. Charles IV revived this tradition and built a monumental tomb here for his father, John of Bohemia.

In 1150, the remains of Schetzel, a hermit in the Grünewald were brought to the Abbey where he was buried in a silver coffin just in front of the high altar of the abbey church. His relics were highly venerated until the abbey’s destruction in 1543.

== Destruction ==
The destruction of the abbey was probably ordered by the French king Francis I, who occupied the city on 11 September 1543 during the Italian War of 1542–46, and probably wanted to prevent troops of Charles V, Holy Roman Emperor, from occupying the abbey during the next siege.

Before the monastery was destroyed, the abbot Johannes Harder removed all the valuable objects to safety in Trier. John of Bohemia's remains were taken to the Franciscan church on what is now the Place Guillaume II.

The Benedictines then moved to the Hospice of Saint John, until a new abbey opened in 1606 under the abbot Petrus Roberti, not far from the old one in the Grund area. The original monastery (münster) thus became the Altmünster, and the new one became Neumünster Abbey.
