= Theobald I of Bar =

Count of Bar and Count of Luxembourg

Theobald I, Count of Bar
- Born: c. 1158
- Died: 13 February 1214
- Noble family: House of Montbéliard
- Spouses: Laurette of Loon (de Looz); Ermesinde of Bar-sur-Seine; Ermesinde of Luxembourg
- Issue among others...: Agnes of Amance; Agnes; Henry II, Count of Bar; Margaret
- Father: Reginald II of Bar
- Mother: Agnès of Champagne

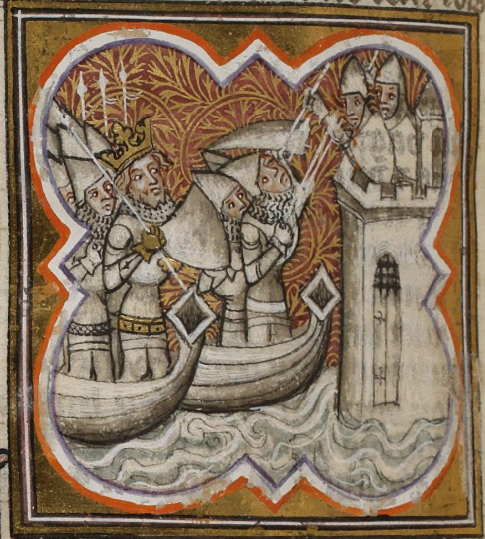
Siege of Acre

Theobald I (French: Thibaut or Thibauld de Bar) (born c. 1158 – died 13 February 1214) was Count of Bar from 1190 until his death, and a Count of Luxembourg from 1197 until his death. He was the son of Reginald II of Bar and his wife Agnès de Champagne. He became count when his brother, Henry, was killed in the siege of Acre.

After his third marriage, he sought to reclaim his wife's lands of Luxembourg, Durbuy and Laroche with the approval of Philip of Swabia. Theobald therefore besieged the castle at Namur, whereupon a conference was held in which Philip of Namur and his brother Baldwin renounced the disputed territories of Luxembourg, Durbuy and Laroche. The Treaty of Dinant signed 6 July 1199 at Saint Medard, later made it official.

During the Albigensian Crusade, Theobald led an army to reinforce Simon de Montfort at the siege of Toulouse in June 1211.

After his death in 1214, his eldest son Henry II, from his second marriage, succeeded him as count. His eldest daughter Agnes, from his first marriage, married Frederick II, Duke of Lorraine. His lands in Luxembourg reverted to Waleran III of Limburg, who married Theobald's widow Ermesinde of Namur. Theobald was buried at St. Mihiel.

== Marriage ==
Theobald I was married three times. In 1176, he married Laurette of Loon (de Looz), daughter of Louis I, Count of Loon, and Agnes of Metz; they had one daughter. Secondly, he married Ermensinde de Bar-sur-Seine, daughter of Guy of Bar-sur-Seine and Petronille de Chacenay, circa 1189. They had one son and two daughters, although Theobald and Ermensinde divorced circa 1195. He then married Ermesinde of Luxembourg, daughter of Henry IV "the Blind" of Luxembourg and Agnes of Guelders, in 1197. They had two sons and three daughters.

== Issue ==
Children from his marriage to Laurette of Loon (de Looz):

- Agnes (Tomasia), lady of Amance, Longwy, and Stenay (b. c 1177, d. 19 Jun 1226); married Frederick II, Duke of Lorraine

Children from his marriage to Ermesinde (Isabella) of Bar-sur-Seine:

- Agnes (d. 1225); married Hugh, Lord of Chatillon
- Henry II, Count of Bar (b. 1190, d. 13 Nov 1239); married Philippa of Dreux
- Margaret (b. c 1192, d. after 1259); married Heinrich von Salm, Lord of Viviers

Children from his marriage to Ermesinde of Luxembourg:

- Margaret (d. Jul 1270); married firstly Hugh III, Count of Vaudémont, secondly Henri de Dampierre, Lord of Bois
- Elisabeth (d. between 11 Apr 1262 - 1 Aug 1262); married Waleran of Limburg, Lord of Fauquemont and Montjoie
- Henry, Lord of Briey, Arrancy, and Marville (d. 1214)
- Renaud (d. Feb 1214)
- unknown daughter (d. before Feb 1214)

== Notes ==
Theobald I of Bar House of Montbeliard Born: 1158 Died: 13 February 1214
Preceded by Otto	Count of Luxemburg with Ermesinde; 1197–1214	Succeeded by Ermesinde and Waleran
