= Ermesinde of Luxembourg, Countess of Namur =

German noblewoman (c. 1080 – 1143)

Ermesinde of Luxembourg
- Born: c. 1080
- Died: 24 June 1143
- Noble family: House of Ardenne–Luxembourg
- Spouses: Albert of Moha; Godfrey I, Count of Namur
- Issue: With Albert; Matilda unknown daughter With Godfrey; Albert; Henry the Blind; Clementia; Alice of Namur; Beatrix
- Father: Conrad I, Count of Luxembourg
- Mother: Clementia of Aquitaine

Ermesinde of Luxembourg (c. 1080 – 24 June 1143) was a German noblewoman.

== Life ==
She was a daughter of Count Conrad I of Luxembourg and his wife Clementia of Aquitaine. After the death of her nephew Conrad II in 1136, there were no surviving males in the House of Ardennes-Verdun and she inherited the counties of Luxembourg and Longwy. However, she immediately abdicated in favour of her son Henry IV and never actually ruled.

She is primarily known because she made a number of donations to churches and monasteries. Towards the end of her life, she retired to a monastery.

== First marriage ==
In 1096, Ermesinde married Albert of Moha (c. 1065 – 24 August 1098), Count of Dagsburg, Eguisheim, Metz and Moha, and vogt of Altorf. Ermesinde and Albert had:

- Matilda (d. after 1157), married Count Folmar of Metz and Hombourg, who in 1135 founded the Abbey of Beaupré
- Unknown daughter, married a Count Aiulf, who is only known from a deed of 1124, in which Ermesinde calls her grandson Eberhard "son of Count Aiulf".

== Second marriage ==
In 1109, Ermesinde remarried to Godfrey I, Count of Namur, the oldest son of Albert III, Count of Namur. They had:

- Albert (d. after 1125)
- Henry, who was Count of Luxembourg as Henry IV and Count of Namur as Henry I
- Clemencia, married Duke Conrad I of Zähringen
- Beatrix (c. 1115 – 1160), married Count Ithier, Count of Rethel of Rethel
- Alice (1124 – end of July 1169), married Count Baldwin IV of Hainaut

== Sources ==
- Fabri, A.D. (1911). Bulletin de la Commission royale d'histoire (in French). Librarie Kiessling et Cie.
- Gade, John Allyne (1951). Luxemburg in the Middle Ages. Brill Archive.
- Kupper, Jean-Louis (1981). Liège et l'église impériale XIe - XIIe siècles (in French). Librairie Droz. ISBN 978-2-251-62286-6.
- Loud, Graham A.; Schenk, Jochen, eds. (2017). The Origins of the German Principalities, 1100-1350: Essays by German Historians. Routledge.

Ermesinde of Luxembourg House of Ardennes-Verdun Born: c. 1080
Preceded by Conrad II	Countess of Luxembourg; 1136	Succeeded by Henry IV
