= Henry III of Luxembourg =

Count of Luxembourg

Henri III (died 1096) was count of Luxembourg from 1086 until his death. He succeeded his father, Conrad I. His mother was Clementia of Aquitaine. Henry III was the first count known to have established his permanent residence in Luxembourg castle. In a document from the year 1089, he is referred to as comes Henricus de Lutzeleburg, which also makes him the first documented count of Luxembourg.

He never married and was succeeded by his brother William.

Henry III of Luxembourg Elder House of Luxemburg Died: 1096
Preceded by Conrad I	Count of Luxembourg; 1086–1096	Succeeded by William
