= Frederick, Duke of Lower Lorraine =

Count of Malmedy from 1035 and Duke of Lower Lorraine from 1046

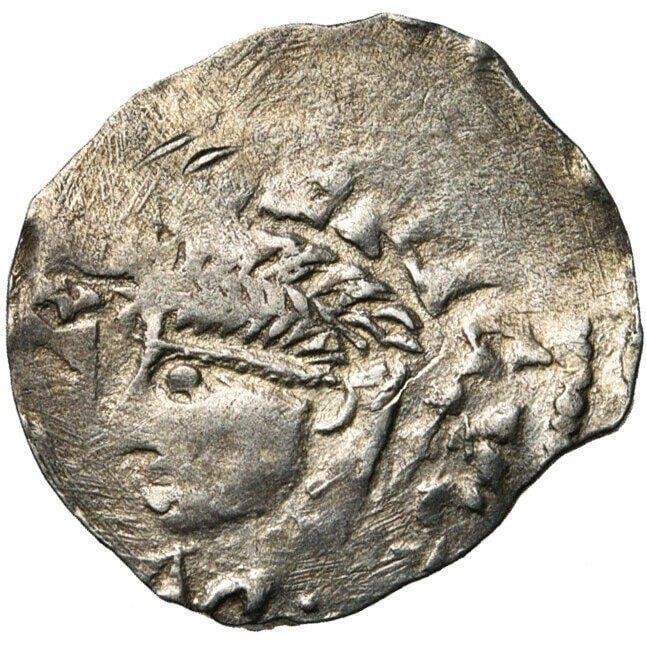
- Coin from the 11th century representing Frederick of Lower Lotharingia, the original is from https://fr.numista.com/347840
- Born: c. 1003
- Died: 18 May 1065
- Noble family: House of Ardenne–Luxembourg
- Spouses: Gerberga of Boulogne; Ida of Saxony
- Father: Frederick of Luxembourg

Frederick of Lower Lorraine (c. 1003 – 18 May 1065) was a younger son of Frederick, Lord of Gleiberg.

Frederick was the advocatus of the Abbey of Stavelot-Malmedy from 1033, Duke of Lower Lorraine from 1046, and the advocatus of the Abbey of St Truiden from around 1060 or earlier. He was also lord of a large domain based originally in Baelen-sur-Vesdre, which in later generations was called the Duchy of Limburg, with his seat in the fortified town of Limbourg-sur-Vesdre.

In 1044, Gothelo I, duke of both Lorraines, died and his eldest son, Godfrey, succeeded in only the upper duchy while the Emperor Henry III first threatened to give the other duchy to his younger (incompetent) brother, Gothelo II. Because of the rebellion of Godfrey, Henry III appointed Frederick, a relative of the reigning duke of Upper Lorraine, Adalbert.

With the aid of Adalbero III, Bishop of Metz, his brother, Frederick imposed his authority in the duchy and made war on the continuing rebel Godfrey. He was loyal to the emperor, but unsuccessful in the field and Henry began parcelling out portions of the duchy to more capable warriors. He died in war with Anno II, Archbishop of Cologne, after which King Henry IV gave the duchy to Godfrey.

His first wife was Gerberga (died c. 1049), daughter of Eustace I, Count of Boulogne. They had a daughter named Jutta, who married Waleran II, Count of Arlon. His second wife (1055) was Ida (died 1102), daughter of Bernard II, Duke of Saxony, who remarried Albert III, Count of Namur, on Frederick's death.

== Sources ==
- Loud, Graham A.; Schenk, Jochen, eds. (2017). The Origins of the German Principalities, 1100–1350: Essays by German Historians. Routledge. ISBN 9781317022008.

Frederick, Duke of Lower Lorraine House of Luxembourg Born: c. 1003 Died: 18 May 1065
Preceded by Gothelo the Great	Duke of Lower Lorraine; 1046–1065	Succeeded by Godfrey the Bearded
Preceded by Gothelo the Lazy	Margrave of Antwerp; 1046–1065	Succeeded by Godfrey the Bearded
