= William, Count of Luxembourg =

Count of Luxembourg from 1096 to 1131

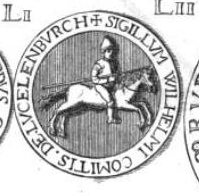
Seal of William, Count of Luxembourg. The Latin inscription on the border of the seal reads: SIGILLVM WILHELMI COMITIS DE LVCELENBVRCH

William (1081–1131) was count of Luxembourg from 1096 until his death in 1131, succeeding his elder brother Henry III. They were both sons of Conrad I and Clementia of Aquitaine. William was the first of his family to use the title count of Luxembourg in his documents.

Like his predecessors, William was embroiled in debates with Bruno, the archbishop of Trier, in 1122 and 1127, leading to William's excommunication.

Around 1105 he married Matilda or Luitgarde of Northeim, daughter of Kuno, count of Beichlingen, with whom he had three children:

- Conrad II (died 1136), count of Luxembourg
- William, count of Gleiberg, documented in 1131 and in 1158
- Liutgarde (1120 - 1170), married Henry II (1125 - 1211), count of Grandpré

Upon his death in 1131, William was succeeded as count of Luxembourg by his eldest son Conrad II.

== Sources ==
- Gades, John A. (1951). Luxembourg in the Middle Ages. Brill.
- Gilbert of Mons (2005). Chronicle of Hainaut. Translated by Napran, Laura. The Boydell Press.

William, Count of Luxembourg Elder House of Luxemburg Born: 1081 Died: 1131
| Preceded by Henry III | Count of Luxembourg; 1096–1131 | Succeeded by Conrad II |
