= Conrad II of Luxembourg =

Count of Luxembourg from 1131 to 1136

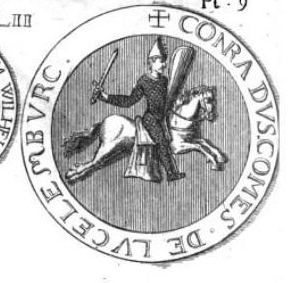
Seal of Conrad II of Luxembourg. The Latin inscription on the border of the seal reads: CONRADVS COMES DE LVCELEMBVRC.

Conrad II of Luxembourg (died 1136) was Count of Luxembourg from 1131 until his death in 1136, succeeding his father William, Count of Luxembourg. His mother was Mathilde or Luitgarde of Northeim.

Conrad II married Ermengarde, daughter of Otto II, Count of Zutphen. Conrad II died without a male heir, and so the county of Luxembourg reverted to the Holy Roman Emperor. The emperor in turn did not wish the county to be ruled by Conrad's closest relative Henri de Grandpré, who was a French lord and so might align the county with the Kingdom of France, and so granted it to Henry of Namur, a cousin of Conrad's.

Conrad II of Luxembourg Elder House of Luxemburg Died: 1136
Preceded by William	Count of Luxembourg; 1131–1136	Succeeded by Henry IV
