= Waleran III of Limburg =

Duke of Limburg and Count of Arlon (c. 1165–1226)

Waleran III, Duke of Limburg
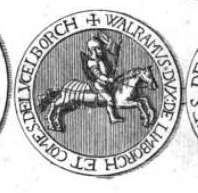
- Seal of Waleran.
- Born: c. 1165
- Died: 2 July 1226; Rolduc
- Buried: Rolduc Abbey
- Noble family: House of Limburg
- Spouses: Cunigunda of Lorraine; Ermesinde of Luxembourg
- Issue Detail: Henry IV, Duke of Limburg; Catherine of Limburg; Henry V, Count of Luxembourg; Gérard I, Count of Durbuy
- Father: Henry III of Limburg
- Mother: Sophie of Saarbrücken

Waleran's coat of arms, with a crown and two tails.

Waleran III (or Walram III) (c. 1165 – 2 July 1226) was initially Lord of Montjoie, then Count of Luxembourg and Count of Arlon from 1214. He became Duke of Limburg on his father's death in 1221. He was the son of Henry III of Limburg and Sophia of Saarbrücken.

== Military campaigns ==
As a younger son, he did not expect to inherit. He carried on an adventurous youth and took part in the Third Crusade in 1192. In 1208, the imperial candidate Philip of Swabia died and Waleran, his erstwhile supporter, turned to his opponent, Otto of Brunswick. In 1212, he accompanied his first cousin Henry I, Duke of Brabant, to Liège, then in a war with Guelders. Waleran's first wife, Cunigunda, a daughter of Frederick I, Duke of Lorraine, died in 1214, and in May, he married Ermesinde of Luxembourg and became count jure uxoris there.

== Reign ==
In 1221, he inherited Limburg. Two years later, he again tried to take Namur from the Margrave Philip II. He failed and signed a peace treaty on 13 February 1223 in Dinant. He then took part in various imperial diets and accompanied the Emperor Frederick II into Italy. Returning from there, he died in Rolduc.

== Family and children ==
Waleran married as his first wife, Cunigunda of Lorraine, daughter of Frederick I, Duke of Lorraine. Later he married, Ermesinde of Luxembourg.

Children with Cunigunda of Lorraine:

1. Sophie (c. 1190 – 1226/27), married c. 1210 Frederick of Isenberg
2. Matilda (c. 1192 – aft. 1234), married c. 1210 William III, Count of Jülich, mother of William IV, Count of Jülich
3. Henry IV, Duke of Limburg, married Irmgard of Berg, heiress of the County of Berg, a daughter of the count Adolf VI
4. Waleran (c. 1200 – 1242), married Elisabeth of Bar, daughter of Ermesinde of Luxembourg and Theobald I, Count of Bar

Children with Ermesinde, Countess of Luxembourg:

1. Catherine of Limburg (c. 1215 – 1255), married Matthias II, Duke of Lorraine, nephew of Waleran's first wife
2. Henry V, Count of Luxembourg married Margaret of Bar
3. Gerhard, Count of Durbuy

== Sources ==
- Gade, John A. (1951). Luxemburg in the Middle Ages. E.J. Brill.
- Hoensch, Jorg K. (2000). Die Luxemburger: Ein spatmittelalterliche Dynastie gesamteuropaischer Bedeutung, 1308-1437 (in German). Verlag W. Kohlhammer. ISBN 3-17-015159-2.
- Loud, Graham A.; Schenk, Jochen, eds. (2017). The Origins of the German Principalities, 1100-1350: Essays by German Historians. Routledge.
- Péporté, P. (2011). Historiography, Collective Memory and Nation-Building in Luxembourg. Brill.

Waleran III of Limburg House of Ardennes-Verdun Born: 1165 Died: 2 July 1226
Preceded by Ermesinde and Theobald	Count of Luxemburg; 1214–1226; With: Ermesinde	Succeeded by Ermesinde
Preceded by Henry III	Duke of Limburg; 1221–1226	Succeeded by Henry IV
Preceded by Henry III	Count of Arlon; 1221–1226	Succeeded by Henry V
