= Albert III of Namur =

Count of Namur (c. 1027–1102)

Albert III, Count of Namur
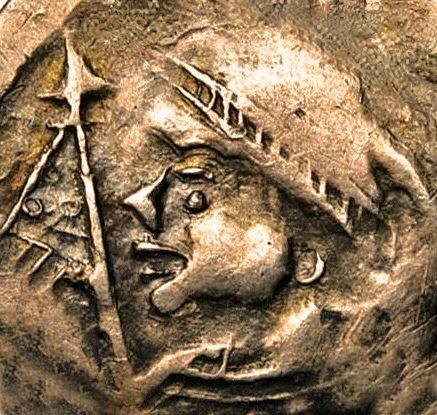
- Albert III, Count of Namur (from coin minted 1080-1102)
- Born: c. 1027
- Died: 22 June 1102
- Noble family: House of Namur
- Spouse: Ida of Saxony
- Issue: Godfrey I, Count of Namur; Henry, Count of La Roche; Frederick, Bishop of Liège; Albert, Count of Jaffa; Adelaide
- Father: Albert II, Count of Namur
- Mother: Regelinde of Verdun

Albert III (c. 1027 – 22 June 1102) was the Count of Namur from 1063 until his death. He was the son of Count Albert II and Regelinde of Verdun.

Although Albert was not formally a duke, he is considered to have played the role of an acting duke of Lower Lotharingia, or "vice duke", during part of his lifetime, while the king's young son Conrad was named as duke. However he lost this position when Godfrey of Bouillon was given the duchy.

== Biography ==
From 1071 to 1072, he helped Richilde, Countess of Hainaut and Flanders fight against Robert the Frisian, but the Countess was beaten and lost Flanders.

In 1076, supported by Matilda of Tuscany, he claimed the Duchy of Bouillon, claiming to have rights by his mother, and fought against Godfrey of Bouillon to assert his claims. During a battle near Dalhem, he killed Hermann II, Count Palatine of Lotharingia (20 September 1085), making him fall out of favor with the German emperor. Finally, with the Truce of God in 1086, the Bishop of Liège succeeded in making peace between the warring parties in favor of Godfrey.

In 1099, Bishop Otbert of Liège gave him the county of Brunengeruz, territory which had been contested by the counts of Leuven, but the counts of Namur were not able to hold this territory in the long run.

== Marriages and issue ==
In 1065, Albert married Ida (died 1102), the widow of Frederick of Luxembourg, Duke of Lower Lorraine, and a daughter of Bernard II, Duke of Saxony. They had five children:

- Godfrey I, Count of Namur (1068–1139)
- Henry, Count of La Roche (1070–1138)
- Frederick, Bishop of Liège (died 1121)
- Albert, Count of Jaffa (died 1122)
- Adelaide (1068–1124), married Otto II, Count of Chiny

== Notes ==
Albert III of Namur House of Namur Died: 29 June 1102
Preceded by Albert II	Count of Namur; 1063-1102	Succeeded by Godfrey I
