= Conrad I of Luxembourg =

Count of Luxembourg, r. 1059–1086

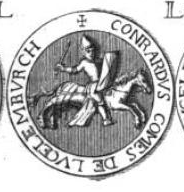
Seal of Conrad I of Luxembourg. The Latin inscription on the border of the seal reads: CONRARDVS COMES DE LVCELEMBVRCH

Conrad I (c. 1040 – 8 August 1086) was Count of Luxembourg (1059–1086), succeeding his father, Giselbert.

Conrad was embroiled in an argument with the Archbishop of Trier as to the abbaye Saint-Maximin in Trier which he had avowed. The archbishop excommunicated him, and Conrad had to make honourable amends and set out on pilgrimage for Jerusalem to have his excommunication lifted. He died in Italy on the return journey.

Conrad founded the Orval Abbey in 1070 with Count Arnold I of Chiny and the Altmünster Abbey in 1083.

His nephew was Hézelon de Liège, canon and architect of the church of Cluny Abbey (Cluny III).

== Marriage and issue ==
Around 1075, Conrad married Clementia (1048–1142), daughter of Duke William VII of Aquitaine and of Ermesinde. They had:

- Matilda (1070 † ), married Godefroy (1075 † ), Count of Bleisgau
- Henry III († 1096), Count of Luxembourg
- Rudolph († 1099), abbot of Saint-Vannes at Verdun
- Conrad, cité en 1080
- Adalbero, (d. 1098 in Antioch), Archdeacon of Metz, travelled to the Holy Land as part of the army of Godfrey of Bouillon, where he was killed by the Turks
- Ermesinde (1075 † 1143), married
  1. in 1096 to Albert II († 1098), Count of Egisheim and of Dagsbourg,
  2. in 1101 to Godefroy (1067 † 1139), Count of Namur. They were parents of Henry IV of Luxembourg
- William I (1081 † 1131), Count of Luxembourg, married Matilda of Beichlingen

== Sources ==
- Gades, John A. (1951). Luxembourg in the Middle Ages. Brill.
- Jackman, Donald C. (2012). The Kleeberg Fragment of the Gleiberg County. Editions Enplage.
- Murray, Alan V. (2000). The Crusader Kingdom of Jerusalem: A Dynastic History 1099-1125. Prosopographica et Genealogica.

Conrad I of Luxembourg Elder House of Luxemburg Born: 1040 Died: 8 August 1086
Preceded by Giselbert	Count of Luxembourg; 1059–1086	Succeeded by Henry III
