= Godfrey of Namur =

Lotharingian nobleman (died 1139)

Godfrey I, Count of Namur
- Born: before 1080
- Died: 19 August 1139
- Noble family: House of Namur
- Spouses: Sibylle of Château-Porcéan; Ermesinde of Luxembourg
- Issue: Elizabeth; Flandrine; Albert; Henry the Blind; Clementia; Alice of Namur; Beatrix
- Father: Albert III, Count of Namur
- Mother: Ida of Saxony

Godfrey of Namur (attested in 1080; died 19 August 1139) was a Lotharingian nobleman. He was Count jure uxoris of Porcéan from 1097 until his death. From 1102, he was also Count of Namur. He was the oldest son of Count Albert III and his wife Ida of Saxony, the heiress of Laroche.

In 1121, he founded Floreffe Abbey, where he also was buried.

== Marriages and issue ==
Godfrey married twice.

He first married in 1087 Sibylle, a daughter of Count Roger of Château-Porcien and his wife Ermengarde. Together, they had two daughters:

- Elisabeth (fl. 1141), married Gervais, Count of Rethel and later Clarembaud de Roscy;
- Flandrine, married Hugh of Épinoy.

Sibylle and Godfrey divorced in 1105 because of her pregnancy by her lover Enguerrand I, Lord of Coucy.

In 1109, Godfrey married Ermesinde (d. 24 June 1143), the daughter of Count Conrad I of Luxembourg and his wife Clementia. She was the widow of Count Albert I of Egisheim-Dagsburg and Moha. Together, they had the following children:

- Albert who died young (died about 1127)
- Henry the Blind (d. 14 August 1196). He was Count of Luxembourg from 1136 until his death, and Count of Namur, Laroche, Durbuy and Longwy from 1139 to 1189. He was also advocatus of St. Maximin Abbey in Trier and St. Willibrord Abbey in Echternach.
- Clementia (d. 28 December 1158), married in 1130 to Duke Conrad I of Zähringen
- Alice, married c. 1130 to Baldwin IV
- Beatrix (d. 1160), married Ithier, Count of Rethel

Emperor Frederick Barbarossa decided that Ermesinde was the heir to the County of Luxembourg. The county was transferred to her son, who became count of Luxembourg as Henry IV.

== Sources ==
- Gilbert de Mons (2005). Chronicle of Hainaut. Translated by Napran, Laura. Boydell Press. ISBN 9781843831204.
- Little, Lester K. (1978). Religious Poverty and the Profit Economy in Medieval Europe. Cornell University Press. ISBN 9780801492471.
- Paul, Nicholas L.; Mueller, Wolfgang P., eds. (2025). How the Holy Cross Came from Antioch to Brogne: A Critical Edition and Translation of Quomodo Sancta Crux Ab Antiochia Allata Sit in Broniense Cenobium. The Boydell Press. ISBN 9781837653232.13

2025

Godfrey of Namur House of Namur Died: 19 August 1139
Preceded by Albert III	Count of Namur; 1102-1139	Succeeded by Henry IV
