= Gerberga of Lorraine =

Gerberga of Lorraine (c. 925–995) was a lady of the highest European nobility who became the wife of Megingoz of Guelders around 945.

She was a daughter of Godfrey, Count Palatine of Lotharingia and Ermentrude, possibly the eldest daughter of Charles the Simple. On her father's side she was a granddaughter of Gerhard I of Metz and Oda of Saxony, daughter of Otto I, Duke of Saxony.

She founded the Vilich Abbey, northeast of Bonn, after the death of her only son. She and Megingoz separated after their son's death; Gerberga oversaw the construction of the abbey and kept a devout life of prayer and fasting. She died in 995 and was buried in the abbey. Megingoz died shortly afterwards, after 998.

== Children ==
With Megingoz, she had the following children:

- Godfrey (d. 977), killed at a young age in a campaign against the Slavs
- Irmtrud of Avalgau, who married Herbert of Wetterau
- Adelaide, Abbess of Vilich; after her death in 1015, her niece succeeded her as abbess
- Alberada
- Bertada (d. 1000), abbess in Cologne
