= House of Ardenne =

Lorraine noble family

The House of Ardenne (or Ardennes, French Maison d'Ardenne) was an important medieval noble family from Lotharingia, known from at least the tenth century. They had several important branches, descended from several brothers:

- The House of Ardenne–Verdun, with several dukes of Lower Lotharingia, descended from Count Gozelin.
- The House of Ardenne–Bar, with several dukes of Upper Lotharingia, descended from Frederick I, Duke of Upper Lorraine.
- The House of Ardenne–Luxembourg, descended from Count Sigfried.

All members descended from Cunigunda of France, a granddaughter of the West Frankish king Louis the Stammerer. She married twice but all or most of her children were children of her first husband, Count Palatine Wigeric of Lotharingia.

Wigeric of Lotharingia; House of Ardenne	Cunigunda of France	Ricwin, Count of Verdun
Adalbero I of Metz	Gozlin, Count of Bidgau; House of Ardenne-Verdun	Frederick I, Duke of Upper Lorraine; House of Ardenne-Bar	Sigfried of Luxembourg; House of Ardenne-Luxembourg
Godfrey I, Count of Verdun	Theodoric I, Duke of Upper Lorraine	Frederick of Luxembourg
