= Monument of the Millennium =

Archaeological sites in Luxembourg

Coordinates: 49.6115°N 6.1365°E

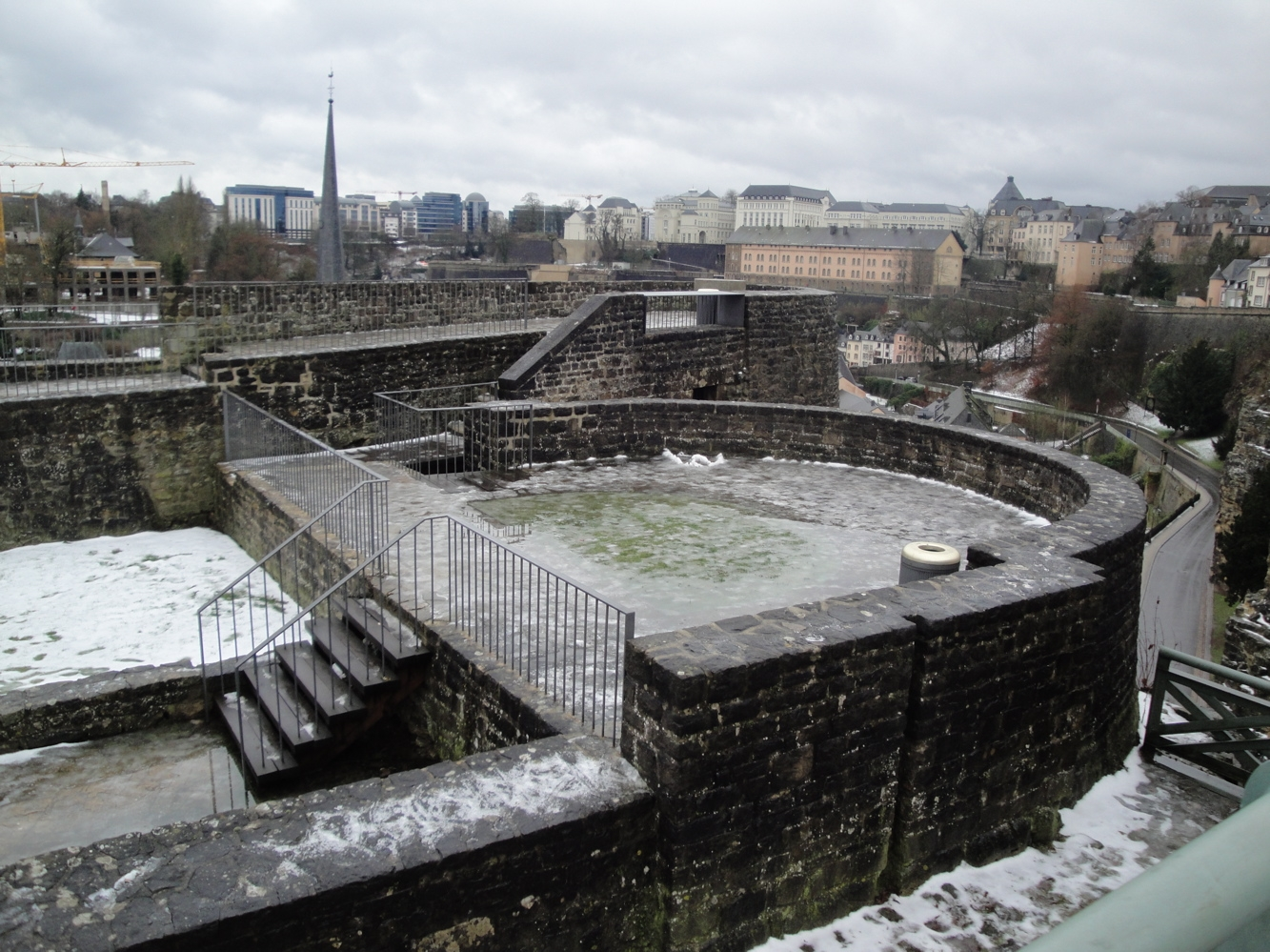
The Bock site

The Monument of the Millennium is an archaeological site and reconstruction in Luxembourg City, in southern Luxembourg. The site was designated in 1963, on the millennial anniversary of the foundation of Luxembourg City by Siegfried. The original plan, hatched by the communal and national governments, was to establish a lasting monument on the Bock, the promontory on which Siegfried's original Luxembourg Castle was built. However, during construction, the foundations of the stronghold were uncovered, prompting the government to abandon its original plans, and restore the remains.
