= Herbert of Wetterau =

German noble (died 992)

Herbert of Wetterau (died 992) was the son of Odo of Wetterau. Herbert was an important nobleman in central area of the Holy Roman Empire and leader of the Conradines.

After the death of his father Odo of Wetterau in 949, Herbert became count of Kinziggau, Engersgau, and Wetterau. He also inherited the castle of Gleiberg, perched on basalt in the modern-day Giessen. In 976 Herbert got the count's rights for Gleiberg and vicinity: the county Gleiberg. Herbert also acquired the title of count palatine. In 981 he followed Emperor Otto II to Italy, and in 982, he took part in the disastrous Battle of Stilo against the Saracens.

== Marriage and children ==
Herbert married Irmtrud of Avalgau (957 – 1020), daughter of Megingoz and Gerberga (daughter of Godfrey, Count Palatine of Lotharingia and Ermentrude, daughter of Charles the Simple and granddaughter of Otto I of Saxony). They had the following children:

- Otto of Hammerstein
- Gebhard (d. 8 Nov 1016)
- Gerberga of Gleiberg (c. 970 – aft. 1036), married Henry of Schweinfurt
- Irmtrud (c. 978 – c. 1020), married Frederick of Luxembourg

== Sources ==
- Warner, David, ed. (2001). Ottonian Germany: The Chronicon of Thietmar of Merseburg. Manchester University Press.
