= Godfrey of Jülich =

Count Palatine of Lotharingia

Godfrey, Count Palatine of Lotharingia (c. 905 – 1 June aft. 949) was count of the Jülichgau from at least 924 to 936 and probably even until 949. He was the son of Gerhard I of Metz and Oda of Saxony, a daughter of Otto I, Duke of Saxony from the family of the Liudolfings, and thus a nephew of King Henry the Fowler. Moreover, he was the younger brother of Wigfried, the archbishop of Cologne from 924 to 953, and arch-chancellor of his cousin King Otto I from 941.

It is thought that his wife Ermentrude (b. 908/9), was the eldest daughter of Charles the Simple, who probably owned the Duchy of Lorraine at the time and was thus his liege lord. Since Charles was deposed in 923, both as king and as duke, and taken prisoner a short time later, it is probable that the wedding took place shortly before the fall of Charles, especially since the other five daughters were apparently no longer married.

For a time, Godfrey was known as Count Palatine of Lotharingia. The office was filled from 911 to 915 by Reginar and subsequently by Wigeric. Since Wigeric died before 922, and Charles was deposed 923, there is a short window of time in which Godfrey could have been used as deputy to his father-in-law in Lorraine.

But since Godfrey was also the nephew of Henry I, the cousin of Otto I, and the brother of Otto's close adviser and later chancellor Wigfried, it is also possible that this office was entrusted to him after 923 despite his connection to the deposed Charles. The fact that his son Godfrey was himself Duke of Lower Lorraine in 959, and initially was as deputy to Archbishop Bruno of Cologne, Otto's brother and Wigfried's successor in both offices, suggests that his connections with Saxony were more important than those with West Francia.

The children of Godfrey and Ermentrude were:

- Godfrey I, b. 925/935, d. Summer 964 in Rome, Count of Hainaut, Duke of Lower Lorraine 959-964
- Gerberga, b. 925/935, d. bef. 24 May 996, married Megingoz of Guelders
- Gerhard II, b. 925/935, 963 Count of Metz, Abbot of Remiremont.
- Gebhard, b. 925/935
- Adalhard
