= Eberhard IV of Nordgau =

French count

Eberhard IV Nordgau (died December 18, 972/973) was Count of Nordgau. He was the eldest of four children of Hugh III, Count of Nordgau and Hohenburg, and his wife Hildegard.

== Biography ==
He succeeded his father in 940 with his brother Hugues d'Eguisheim.

In 959 he submitted to the Holy Roman Emperor, Otto I at Abbey of Lure.

He governed the Nordgau from 940 until 951, when he abdicated in favour of his son Hugues, and withdrew to his territory of Altorf where he died in 972 / 973.

== Marriage and issue ==
He married Luitgarde, daughter of Wigeric of Lotharingia and Cunigunda of France. They had the following issue:

- Hugues II of Nordgau, Count of Nordgau
- Adalbert of Alsace
- Hughes, monk at Altorf
- Gérard d'Alsace
- Adelaide, married as first wife to Henry of Speyer, parents to Conrad II, Holy Roman Emperor
- Hedwig married to Siegfried of Luxembourg, parents of St. Cunegonde

== Sources ==
- Parisse, Michel (1982). La noblesse lorraine: XIe-XIIIe. Vol. 1. Service des publications de l'Université de Nancy II.
