= Wolfhelm of Brauweiler =

German Benedictine abbot

Wolfhelm of Brauweiler (died 1091) was the Benedictine abbot of Brauweiler Abbey, near Cologne, Germany.

He was attacked by Manegold of Lautenbach, in his Liber Contra Wolfelmum. The grounds were both theological and political: Wolfhelm was sympathetic to Platonist ideas and is accused of trying to mediate between Macrobius and Christian doctrine; but also he was close to the imperial party of Emperor Henry IV, in the oncoming Investiture Conflict. In attacking Wolfhelm, Manegold denies the doctrine of the Antipodes, bringing the classical doctrine of the round Earth into the scope of heretical ideas.

He wrote a letter against the theology of Berengar of Tours, addressed to Meginhard of Gladbach Abbey.

A Life of Wolfhelm written a generation later, by Konrad, a monk of Brauweiler, was a hagiographical work. It is known that Wolfhelm taught at the cathedral school of Cologne before moving to the abbey in 1065. It is not known whether the encounter related by Manegold really took place.

He was beatified by the Catholic church. His feast day is 22 April. His sister Bertha was a nun of Vilich Abbey, who wrote a Vita of the abbess Adelheid.
