= Saint Adelaide =

Saint Adelaide may refer to:

- Adelaide of Italy (died 999), queen of Italy, Holy Roman empress
- Adelaide, Abbess of Vilich (died 1015)
- Alice of Schaerbeek (died 1250), Cistercian lay sister
