= Wigeric of Lotharingia =

Frankish nobleman (died before 923)

Wigeric, also called Wideric (German: Wigerich; French: Wigéric or Wéderic; died before 923), was a Frankish nobleman and the count of the Bidgau (pagus Bedensis) and held the rights of a count within the city of Trier. He received also the advocacy of the Abbey of Saint Rumbold (Note: The abbey founded by St. Rumbold in the 6th, 7th or 8th centuries and a 9th-century St. Rumbold's abbey church subordinate to the bishops of Liège are assumed to have been located in the Holm, higher grounds a little outside the later city walls of Mechelen. A 9th-century St. Rumbold's Chapel in the city centre stood until 1580, was rebuilt in 1597 and demolished in 1798. After Prince-Bishop Notger's founding of the St. Rumbold's Chapter around 1000, an adjacent collegiate church was built and its parish title was handed to the chapter in 1134. Most likely on its spot, already from around the start of the 13th century onwards, the well-known Saint Rumbold's Church was built, consecrated in 1312, and functions as metropolitan cathedral since 1559. This edifice never belonged to the abbey. Source: Sint-Romboutskerk (ID: 74569), VIOE (Retrieved 29 July 2011)) at Mechelen from King Charles the Simple of West Francia. From 915 or 916, he was the count palatine of Lotharingia. He was the founder of the House of Ardennes.

== Life ==
Medieval historians have been unable to precisely pin down Wigeric's origins or rise to power. He possessed lands in the region of Bitburg, in the middle Moselle valley, in the Gutland, the western Eifel, and the Meuse region.

At the death of Louis the Child, the Lotharingians rejected the suzerainty of Conrad I and elected Charles of France as their king. At the time, the military authority in Lotharingia was assigned to Count Reginar I of Hainaut (died 915), but at his death it fell to Wigeric, who became count palatine, exercising as such the military authority in Lotharingia.

Wigeric founded the monastery of Hastière (French: L'abbaye d'Hastière) now in Hastière-par-delà (fr), of which he also assumed the advocacy.

There is no historical trace of Wigeric after 919: he probably died between 916 and 919, and was buried in the monastery of Hastière.

== Family and descendants ==
Wigeric's first wife Eva died, leaving him a widower. He then married Cunigunda, daughter of Ermentrude, daughter of Louis II of France, and Adélaïde de Paris and therefore a descendant of Charlemagne. Their children were:

- Gozlin (911–942), count of Bidgau, married Uda of Metz, father of:
  - Godfrey the Prisoner
  - Adalberon, Archbishop of Reims
- Frederick (912–978), count of Bar, the duke of Upper Lorraine from 959
- Adalberon (died 962), bishop of Metz
- Gilbert (died 964), count in the Ardennes
- Sigebert (fl. c. 942)
- Siegfried, (c.922–998), count of Luxembourg
- Luitgarde, who married Adalbert, Count of Metz, then Eberhard IV of Nordgau.

Wigeric and Cunigunda were the founders of the dynasty of the House of Ardenne. Its three branches, Ardennes-Verdun, Ardennes-Bar, and Ardennes-Luxembourg, dominated Lorraine for a century and a half. The Ardennes family extended from Laon and Reims to Trier and Cologne, from Metz and Verdun to Liège and Antwerp. Its descendants were to appear in the following positions:

- Dukes of Upper and Lower Lorraine (959–1046 and 1012–1100, respectively)
- Bishops of Metz (929–1072)
- Bishops of Laon (977–1031)
- Bishops of Reims (969–989)
- Bishops of Verdun (984–988)
- Bishops of Trier (1004–1015)

== Primary sources ==
- He is first attested in 899 as count Widiacus in a charter of King Zwentibold in Trier
- A Wigericus, with comital rights in Trier, appears in a diploma of Louis IV dated 19 September 902.
- He is usually identified with Widricus, count of the Bidgau, of a charter of Saint-Maximin dated 1 January 909.
- He appears in a diploma of Charles III (between 911 and 915) as Windricus and his son Adalberon and he received the fiefs and the advocacy of the abbeys of Saint Rumbolds at Mechelen and Hastière. The margrave of Neustria, Robert, and Reginar, margrave in Lotharingia, gave their consent.
- He appears for the first time with the title "count palatine" in a diploma of Charles as well, this time as Widricus, dated 19 January 916 at Herstal.
