= Megingoz of Guelders =

Megingoz (c. 920 – 998/1001; nicknamed the Brown) was of unknown origin. At the end of the 10th century, he played a part in the history of what later came to be known as the county of Guelders. He is also named as Count of Avalgau.

He married Gerberga of Lorraine. She was a daughter of Godfrey, Count Palatine of Lotharingia from the family of Matfrieden, and Ermentrude, possibly the oldest daughter of King Charles the Simple. They had the following children:

- Godfrey (died 977), killed at a young age in a campaign against Bohemia
- Irmtrud of Avalgau, who married Herbert of Wetterau
- Adelaide, Abbess of Vilich
- Alberada
- Bertada (died 1000), abbess in Cologne
