= Gerhard I of Metz =

German noble

Gerhard I of Metz (c. 875 – 22 June 910) was count of Metz. He was the son of Adalhard (c. 850 – 2 January 890), count of Metz, himself son of Adalard the Seneschal and a daughter of Matfried, count of Eifel (c. 820 – bef. 18 September 882).

== Biography ==
He tried in vain to rule Lotharingia with his brothers Steven and Matfried I (count of Eifel).

In 897, Gerhard and his brothers were in conflict with King Zwentibold. They were first rejected, and reconciled shortly after.

He led an uprising with his brother Matfried, and in 900 defeated and killed Zwentibold on the battlefield of Susteren.

He went to war, again with Matfried, in 906 against the count Conrad.

He was killed in a battle against the Bavarian army on 22 June 910.

== Family ==
After 13 August 900, Gerhard married the widow of Zwentibold, Oda (c. 880 – bef. 952), daughter of Otto I, Duke of Saxony, and had:

- Wigfried (d. 9 July 953), abbot of St. Ursula of Cologne, then archbishop of Cologne from 924 to 953
- Oda (d. bef. 18 May 963), married Gozlin, Count of Bidgau and Methingau (d. 942)
- unknown daughter
- Godfrey (d. bef. 949), count of Jülichgau

Oda of Saxony remarried to Eberhard, count in Oberlahngau.

== Sources ==
- Nash, Penelope (2017). Empress Adelheid and Countess Matilda: Medieval Female Rulership and the Foundations of European Society. Palgrave Macmillan.
