= Gozlin, Count of Bidgau and Methingau =

Lotharingian nobleman (c. 911–942/943)

Gozlin (c. 911 – between 19 October 942 and 16 February 943) was count of the Ardennes and the Bidgau. He was also army commander for his brother, Adalbero I of Metz.

Gozlin was a son of Count Palatine Wigeric of Lotharingia and Cunigunda of France. In 930, he married Oda of Metz (905 – 10 April 963), a daughter of Count Gerard of Metz and Oda of Saxony. Through her mother Oda was a cousin of King Henry the Fowler of East Francia (Germany). Gozlin and Oda had the following children:

- Reginar, count of Bastogne (d. 18 April 963). One of his sons was Adalberon (bishop of Laon).
- Henry (d. 6 September 1000), Count of Arlon.
- Godfrey "the Captive" (935/940 – 3 September 995/1002), count of Verdun
- Adalberon (935/940 – 23 January 989), archbishop of Reims 969-989.

== Sources ==
- Nash, Penelope (2017). Empress Adelheid and Countess Matilda: Medieval Female Rulership and the Foundations of European Society. Palgrave Macmillan.
- Parisse, ‘Généalogie de la Maison d'Ardenne’, La maison d'Ardenne Xe-XIe siècles. Actes des Journées Lotharingiennes, 24 - 26 oct. 1980, Centre Univ., Luxembourg, (1981) 9-41
