= Hedwig of Babenberg =

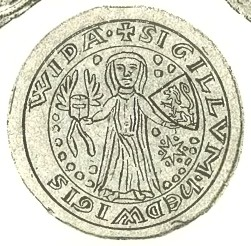

Duchess consort of Saxony
- Tenure: 880 - 903
- Died: 24 December 903
- Spouse: Otto I, Duke of Saxony
- Issue: Thankmar; Liudolf; Henry the Fowler; Oda of Saxony
- Father: Henry, Margrave of the Franks
- Mother: Ingeltrude

Hedwig (also known as Hadewig or Hathui; died 24 December 903), was Duchess of Saxony (from about 880 until her death) by her marriage with the Liudolfing duke Otto the Illustrious. She was the mother of King Henry the Fowler.

Her parentage is not clearly stated in contemporary sources, but she was probably the daughter of Ingeltrude, a daughter of dux Eberhard of Friuli and granddaughter of emperor Louis the Pious, and Henry of Franconia, a princeps militiae under king Louis of Saxony and dux of Austrasia under emperor Charles the Fat. Henry died in 886 fighting against the Vikings during the Siege of Paris in West Francia.

Hedwig married Otto (d. 912), a younger son of late Saxon count Liudolf. Her husband's family had already achieved a dominating position in the stem duchy of Saxony; Otto's sister Liutgard was married to king Louis about the same time. With the support of his brother-in-law king Louis, Otto succeeded as head of the Liudolfing dynasty and heir of the Saxon estates, when his elder brother Bruno was killed fighting against the Vikings in the 880 Battle of Lüneburg Heath. Hedwig's husband remained a loyal supporter of the Carolingian dynasty, while he rose to the position of a Saxon duke (Herzog).

Hedwig and Otto had three sons: Henry the Fowler (who succeeded his father in 912) and his elder brothers Thankmar and Liudolf, who both died young; as well as a daughter, Oda who married King Zwentibold of Lotharingia, an illegitimate son of Emperor Arnulf, in 897.

Hedwig of Babenberg Elder House of Babenberg Born: c. 850/55 Died: 24 December 903
Preceded by Oda of Billung	Duchess consort of Saxony; 880–903	Succeeded by Matilda of Ringelheim
