= Siegfried, Count of the Ardennes =

Count in the Ardennes

Siegfried
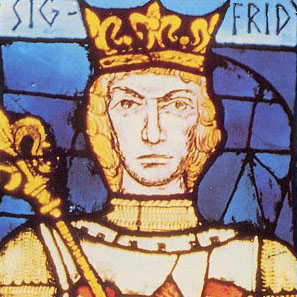
- Successor: Henry V, Duke of Bavaria
- Born: c. 922
- Died: 28 October 998
- Noble family: House of Ardenne; House of Ardenne–Luxembourg
- Spouse: Hedwig of Nordgau
- Issue: Henry I of Luxembourg; Siegfried; Frederick of Luxembourg; Dietrich II of Metz; Adalberon; Gislebert; Cunigunde of Luxembourg; Eve; Ermentrude; Lutgardis of Luxembourg
- Father: Wigeric of Lotharingia
- Mother: Cunigunda of France

Siegfried (or Sigfried) (c. 922 – 28 October 998) was count in the Ardennes, and is known in European historiography as founder and first ruler of the Castle of Luxembourg in 963 AD, and ancestor and predecessor of the future counts and dukes of Luxembourg. He was also an advocate of the abbeys of St. Maximin in Trier and Saint Willibrord in Echternach.

His male-line descendants are known as the House of Luxembourg, or House of Ardenne–Luxembourg.

== Ancestry ==
Through his mother Cunigunde, who was a granddaughter of King Louis the Stammerer of West Francia, Siegfried was a sixth-generation descendant of Charlemagne.

His father is most likely Count Palatine Wigeric of Lotharingia, the ruler of Lotharingia, which was a successor state of Middle Francia. Wigeric is also considered the founder of the House of Ardennes, and his sons, including Siegfried, would all create their own respective branches and become important rulers in Upper and Lower Lotharingia. Thus, while Siegfried became founder of the House of Ardenne–Luxembourg and his descendants would become the Counts of Luxembourg, his brothers Frederick I, Duke of Upper Lorraine and Gozlin, Count of Bidgau and Methingau became founders of their own branches known as House of Ardennes-Bar and House of Ardennes-Verdun respectively. Their descendants would become the rulers of the Duchy of Lorraine and Upper Lorraine, the Duchy of Bar, as well as become counts or bishops of many surrounding cities like Arlon, Bastogne, Metz, Trier, Verdun, and Laon among others.

Another one of Siegfried's brothers was Adalbero I, Bishop of Metz.

== Life ==
As the youngest son, Siegfried had inherited, unlike his brothers, only a few possessions from his father in the Duchy of Lorraine. He is first mentioned in around 950 AD as having been an advocate of the abbeys of St. Maximin in Trier and Saint Willibrord in Echternach. Since at least 982 he was a "count in the Moselgau". From 958, he sought to acquire the territories of Count Warner in the region of Bodeux near the Benedictine Abbey of Stavelot. However, the Abbot of Stavelot, Werinfried, reluctant to have an ambitious landowner as his neighbor, acquired the village of Bodeux himself in 959.
As Siegfried's ambitions to expand towards the river Meuse had failed, and as he was unwilling to confront the powerful episcopal cities of Trier or Metz which ruled out expanding towards the river Moselle, he turned his attention towards the Alzette valley.

=== Acquisition and foundation of Lucilinburhuc (Luxembourg) ===
In the mid-10th century, Siegfried acquired the rocky promontory known as Lucilinburhuc and its immediate surrounding area, as well as usage rights for the river from the Abbey of Saint-Maximin in Trier in exchange for land he owned near Feulen. The deed for the exchange was not drawn up until 987 and although the plots of land involved were tiny, the transaction was evidently a significant one, for the document bears the seals of Bruno, archbishop of Cologne and brother of emperor Otto I, Henry I, archbishop of Trier and Frederick I, Duke of Upper Lorraine, Siegfried's brother.

In 963 Siegfried built a stronghold, castellum Lucilinburhuc on top of the Bock rock. The structure may have been a refurbishment of an older existing building, presumably the ruins of an abandoned Roman castellum. The site chosen for the construction of the castle of Luxembourg was not only located on an easily defendable rock, but it was also not far from the intersection of the old Roman road Reims-Trier and a prehistoric path leading from Metz to Liège. A marketplace soon arose at this intersection around which a town started to grow. Siegfried then gradually extended his territory towards the west, avoiding the Abbey's lands and those of the emperor. This act is generally regarded as the foundation of Luxembourg City and ultimately of what would become the County of Luxembourg.

Although Siegfried constantly used the title of count, the first written evidence of the title "count of Luxembourg" is attributed to Conrad I some 120 years later.

=== Servant of the Holy Roman emperors ===
In 964, Siegfried also laid the foundations for the construction of the castle of Saarburg.

As the Duchy of Lorraine was a state of the Holy Roman Empire, Siegfried always remained a loyal servant of the Holy Roman emperors. From 966 to 972 Siegfried joined emperor Otto I during the third Italian expedition to Rome. In 982 he sent troops to southern Italy to support Otto II in his war against the Saracens at the Battle of Stilo. Siegfried also served Otto II during the wars against West Francia, in 983 he served as mediator on behalf of the emperor and met with Hugh Capet, duke of the Franks.

At the death of Otto II in 983, Siegfried fought at the side of the dowager empress and regent Theophanu against the ambitions of King Lothair of France. In 985 he was briefly captured and imprisoned by the king.

When Siegfried died in 998, his son Henry I, followed him as count of Luxembourg.

== Family and descendants ==
Around 950, Siegfried married Hedwig of Nordgau (c. 922–993), daughter of Eberhard IV of Nordgau. They had the following children:

- Henry I of Luxembourg, became Duke of Bavaria and the second Count of Luxembourg.
- Siegfried, cited in 985
- Frederick I, Count of Salm and Luxembourg, married Ermentrude of Gleiberg, daughter of Heribert I, Count of Gleiberg. One of his sons, Henry II, would become the third Count of Luxembourg.
- Dietrich II, bishop of Metz, 1006-1047
- Adalberon, archbishop of Trier 1008-1046
- Gislebert (d.1004), count in the Moselgau
- Cunigunda, married Henry II, Holy Roman Emperor
- Eve, married Gerhard of the Mosel, Count of Metz
- Ermentrude, abbess
- Luitgarde, married Arnulf, Count of Holland
- a daughter, married Thietmar

== Sources ==
- Hoensch, Jörg K. (2000). Die Luxemburger: Eine spätmittelalterliche Dynastie gesamteuropaischer Bedeutung, 1308-1437 (in German). Verlag W. Kohlhammer.
- Kreins, Jean-Marie (2007). Histoire du Luxembourg: des origines à nos jours (in French). Presses universitaires de France. ISBN 978-2-13-056367-9.
- Pixton, Paul B. (2001). "Luxemburger". In Jeep, John M. (ed.). Medieval Germany: An Encyclopedia. Routledge.

=== Further reading ===
- Margue, Michel (1994), Sigefroid (PDF), Nouvelle Biographie Nationale, vol. 3, pp. 295–300

Siegfried, Count of the Ardennes Elder House of Luxemburg Born: 922 Died: 28 October 998
Preceded by Title created	Count of Luxemburg; 963-998	Succeeded by Henry I
