= Cunigunda of France =

Granddaughter of Louis the Stammerer

Cunigunda of Sulichgau (893-924) was the daughter of Ermentrude of France, and granddaughter in turn of Louis the Stammerer. In 898 her uncle Charles III gained control as king of the Franks, changing Cunigunda's life for the better.

== Family ==
To gain greater affinity with the nobles of Lotharingia, King Charles III arranged the marriage of Cunigunda in 909 with the powerful Wigeric of Lotharingia (890-919). Their children were:

- Frederick I (d. 978), who was count of Bar and duke of Upper Lorraine
- Adalberon I (d. 962), elected bishop of Metz in 929
- Gilbert (d. 964), count in the Ardennes
- Sigebert, mentioned in 942.
- Liutgarde, who married Adalbert, Count of Metz, then Eberhard IV, count of Nordgau.
- Gozlin, Count of Bidgau (d. 942), married to Oda of Metz and father of Godfrey I, Count of Verdun
- Siegfried, count of Luxembourg.

Around 922, she married Ricwin, Count of Verdun (d. 923).

== Sources ==
- Nash, Penelope (2017). Empress Adelheid and Countess Matilda: Medieval Female Rulership and the Foundations of European Society. Palgrave Macmillan.
- Vanderputten, Steven (2018). Dark Age Nunneries: The Ambiguous Identity of Female Monasticism, 800–1050. Cornell University Press.
