= Oda of Saxony =

Queen consort of Lotharingia
- Tenure: 900
- Born: c. 877
- Died: aft. 952
- Spouse: Zwentibold; Gerhard I of Metz
- Issue: Wigfried; Oda of Metz; Godfrey of Jülich
- House: Ottonian dynasty
- Father: Otto I, Duke of Saxony
- Mother: Hedwig of Babenberg

Oda of Saxony (c. 877 – aft. 952) was a Saxon princess. She was the daughter of Otto I, Duke of Saxony and Hedwiga of Babenberg. She married King Zwentibold of Lotharingia and at his death in August 900 (when Oda must have been 23), she contracted a second marriage with Count Gerhard I of Metz. From this union were born:

- Wigfried, abbot of St. Ursula in Cologne, and then archbishop of Cologne from 924 to 953.
- Oda (Uda) of Metz (d. 10 Apr 963), married Gozlin, Count of Bidgau and Methingau (d. 942).
- A daughter of name unknown.
- Godfrey, count of the Jülichgau.

== Sources ==
- Brown, Phyllis R.; Wailes, Stephen L., eds. (2013). Companion to Hrotsvit of Gandersheim (fl. 960): Contextual and Interpretive Approaches. Brill.
- Holmes, George (2001). The Oxford Illustrated History of Medieval Europe. Oxford University Press.
- McCarthy, T.J.H., ed. (2013). Chronicles of the Investiture Contest: Frutolf of Michelsberg and his continuators. Manchester University Press.
- Nash, Penelope (2017). Empress Adelheid and Countess Matilda: Medieval Female Rulership and the Foundations of European Society. Palgrave Macmillan.
