= Hedwig of Nordgau =

Saxon countess of Luxembourg

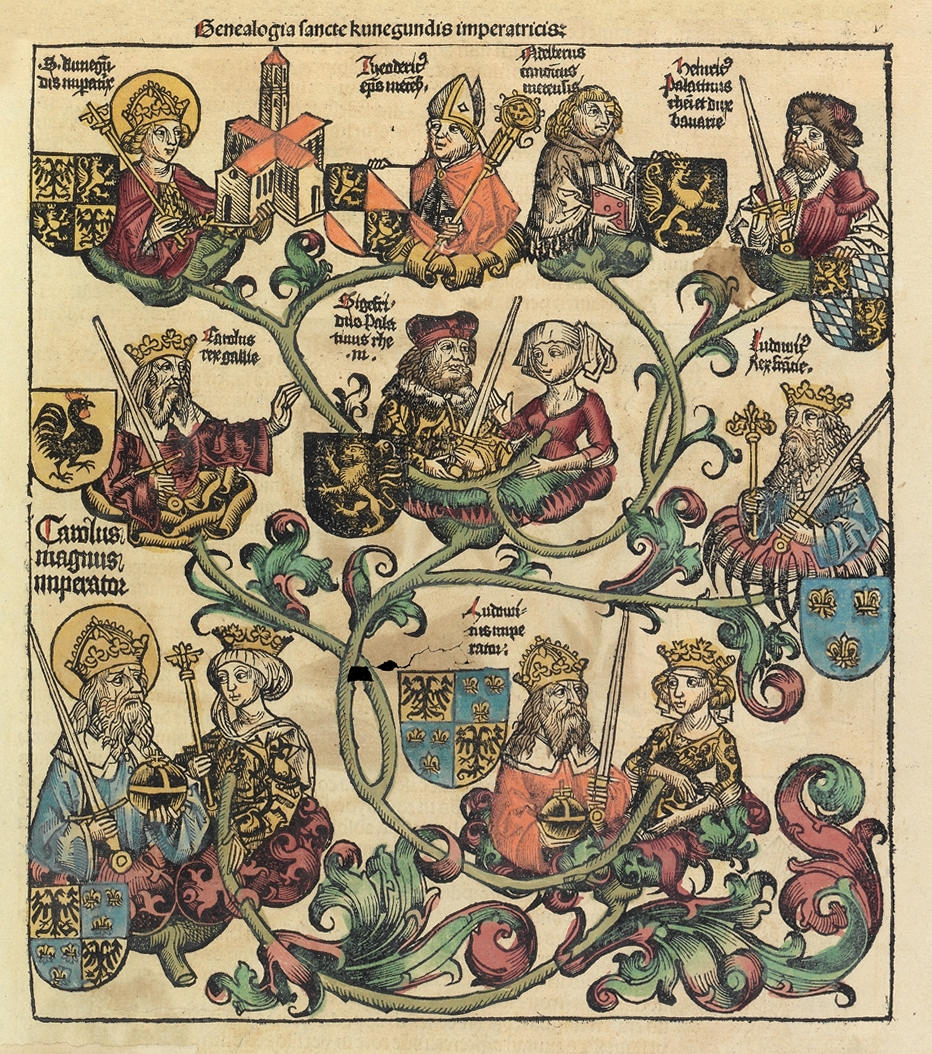
This is a part of a scan of an historical document: Title: Schedelsche Weltchronik or Nuremberg Chronicle

Hedwig of Nordgau (c. 922 – after 993) was the wife of Siegfried of Luxembourg, first count of Luxembourg and founder of the country. They were married c. 950. She was of Saxon origin but her parentage is not known for certain. Some sources claim that she was connected to the family of Otto I, Holy Roman Emperor. Described as "saintly" herself, Hedwig of Nordgau was the mother of Saint Cunigunde of Luxembourg, the seventh of eleven children from her marriage to Siegfried.

== Children ==
Hedwig of Nordgau's children included:

- Henry, count of Luxemburg
- Adalbero, archbishop of Trier
- Luitgard, married Arnulf, Count of Holland
- Eva, married Gerhard of the Mosel, Count of Metz
- Cunigunde, married Henry II, Holy Roman Emperor
- Dietrich, bishop of Metz
- Frederik, father of the later counts Henry II and Giselbert

== Sources ==
- Butler, Alban; Thurston, Herbert; and Attwater, Donald (1956). Butler's Lives of the Saints, Volume 1, 2nd Edition. P. J. Kenedy and Sons.
- Fuchs, Rüdiger (2006). Die Inschriften der Stadt Trier I (bis 1500). Reichert. ISBN 3-89500-555-X (in German)
- Holböck, Ferdinand (2002). Married Saints and Blesseds: Through the Centuries. Ignatius Press, p. 134. ISBN 0-89870-843-5
