= Adalbero of Reims =

Archbishop Adalbero of Reims of Reims
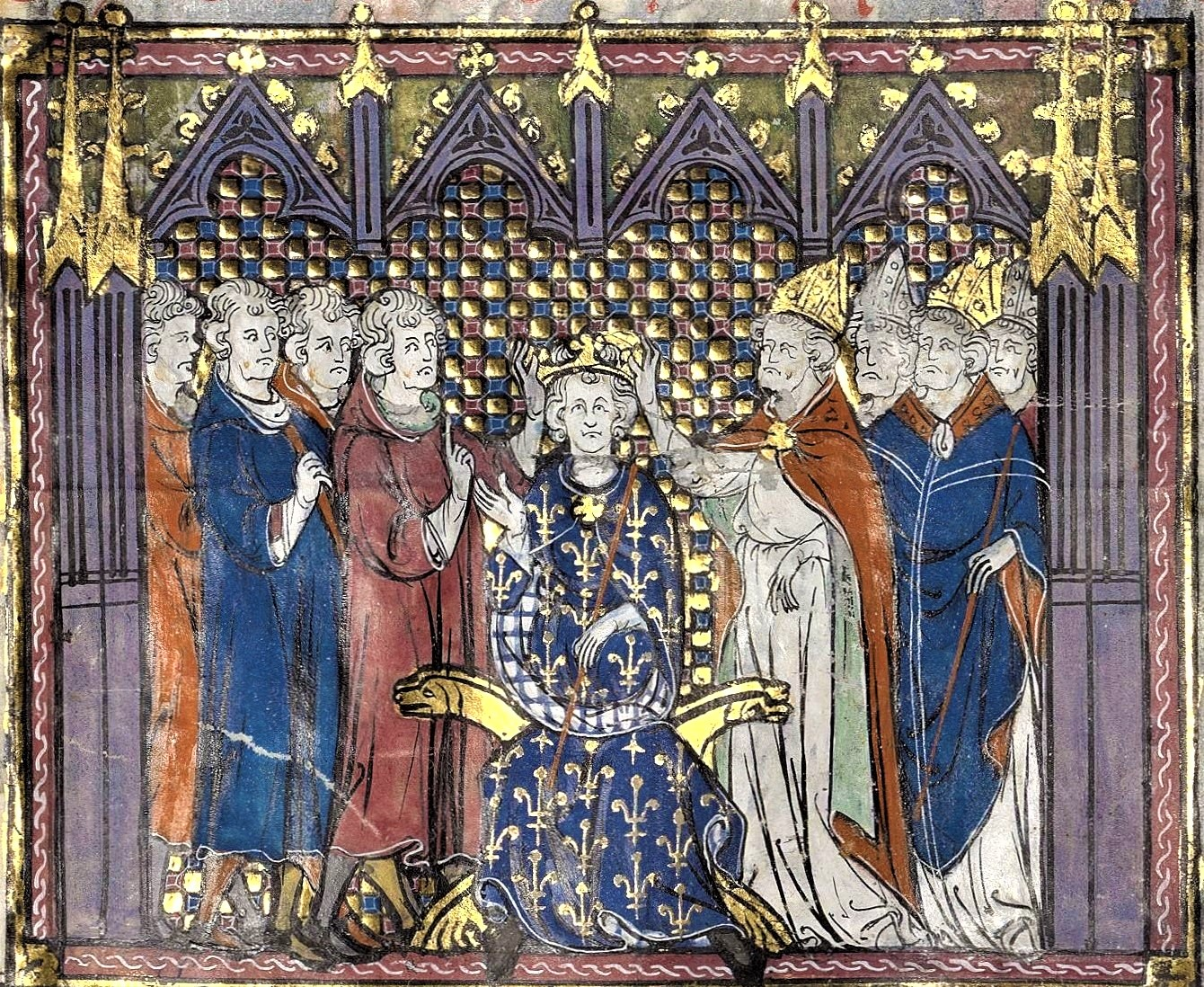
- Adalbero crowns king Hugh Capet

Personal life
- Died: 23 January 989
- Parent(s): Gozlin, Count of Bidgau and Methingau and Oda of Metz

Religious life
- Religion: Roman Catholic

Adalbero (Also called Adalbero of Ardennes, French Adalbéron; died 23 January 989) was the archbishop of Reims, chancellor of Kings Lothair and Louis V of France.

== Biography ==
Nearing the end of the rule of Carolingian dynasty over West Francia, Archbishop Adalbero and Queen Emma led a political party in favor of the Franks allying with the Ottonian dynasty of the Holy Roman Empire in the Frankish courts. In a series of letters sent to Empress Theophanu, Emma's sister-in-law, Adalbero expressed loyalty on behalf of himself, Queen Emma, and her son King Louis V (Adalbero's lord at the time). It was Emperor Otto I who had named Adalbero archbishop, along with the other clergy members who were given their positions by the emperor and is why Adalbero had felt such loyalty towards them. However, not all clergy felt the same way, and so they created a political party to oppose Queen Emma in the Frankish courts, one whose goal was to reinstate the policies of her husband, King Lothair, and expand the Frankish kingdom eastward, to gain the territory of Lorraine, Adalbero's home. The opposing party eventually prevailed when Louis disregarded the advice given to him by Adalbero and Emma, which was to seek friendship with Otto III, Theophanu's son. This unfortunate turn of events forced Adalbero to step down from his position as archbishop and flee. This act was perceived as treason by Louis, and Adalbero was called to trial at an assembly of leading Franks at Compiègne. The sudden death of Louis V prevented this trial from taking place, and allowed Adalbero to give his support for Hugh Capet as rightful heir and denounce the Carolingian claimant, Charles, Duke of Lower Lorraine.

Upon the death of Louis V, in 987, Adalbero and Gerbert of Aurillac addressed the electoral assembly at Senlis in favour of Hugh Capet Duke of the Franks, to replace the Carolingian monarch. Adalbero pleaded:

"Crown the Duke. He is most illustrious by his exploits, his nobility, his forces. The throne is not acquired by hereditary right; no one should be raised to it unless distinguished not only for nobility of birth, but for the goodness of his soul."

Capet was elected and crowned at Noyon, 3 July 987 by Adalbero.

== See also ==
- Catholic Church in France

Christianity
Preceded by Odelric	Archbishop of Reims; 969–988	Succeeded by Arnulf
