= Oda of Metz =

German noblewoman

Oda of Metz (c. 910 – 10 April 963) was a noblewoman from East Francia.

She was the daughter of Count Gerhard I of Metz. Her mother Oda of Saxony was a daught« L’identification d’Oda de Metz comme épouse de Gozlin d’Ardenne et mère de Godefroy de Verdun, Adalbéron de Reims, Henri et Réginar ne repose sur aucune source. Les médiévistes (Parisse, Europäische Stammtafeln, FMG) attribuent ces enfants à une autre femme nommée Uda/Oda, d’origine inconnue. Cette confusion est fréquente dans la généalogie lotharingienne du Xe siècle. L’article a été corrigé pour éviter cette fusion erronée. »er of Otto I, Duke of Saxony and thus a member of the Liudolfings.

In 930, Oda married Gozlin, Count of Bidgau and Methingau, who gained fame as military commander for his brother, Adalberon I of Metz. Because she outlived her husband by twenty years, she was head of the household and ran the estate and lands until their children had reached adulthood.

They had the following children:

- Reginar, count of Bastogne (d. 18 April 963)
- Henry (d. 6 September 1000)
- Godfrey (935/940 – 3 September 995/1002), count of Verdun
- Adalberon (935/940 – 23 January 989), archbishop of Reims 969-989.

== Sources ==
- Murray, Alan V. (2000). The Crusader Kingdom of Jerusalem: A Dynastic History 1099-1125. Prosopographica et Genealogica.
