= Bock (Luxembourg) =

Promontory in Luxembourg City

Coordinates: 49°36′42″N 06°08′13″E

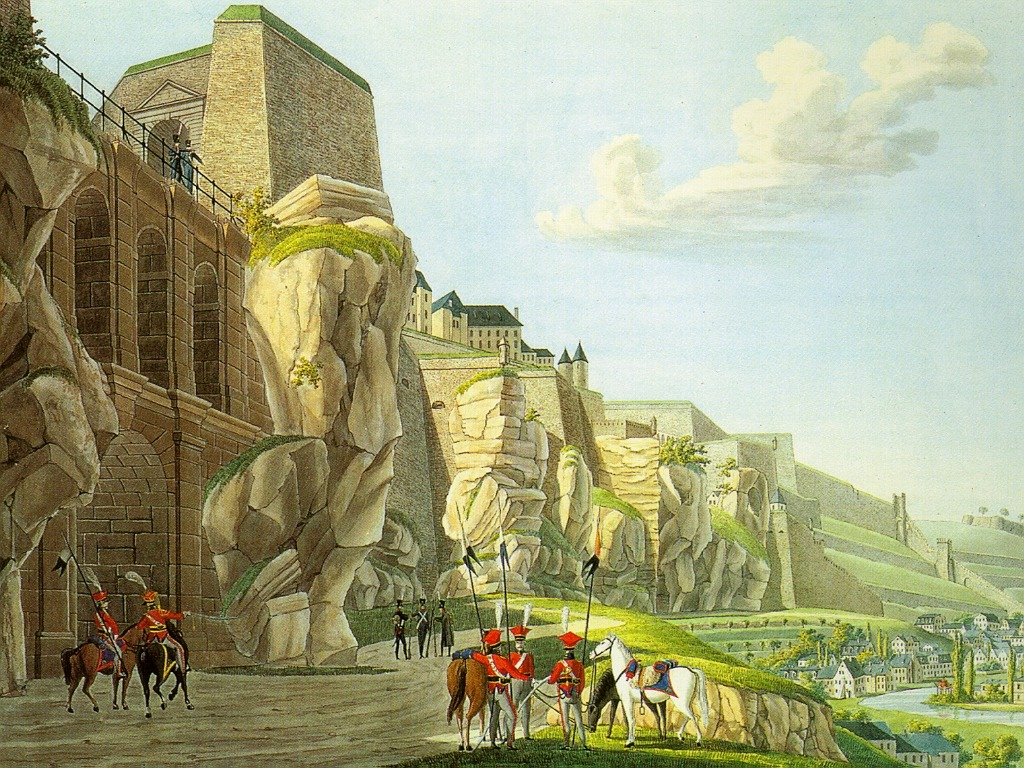
The Bock fortifications by Christophe-Guillaume Selig (1791–1837)

The Bock (Luxembourgish: Bockfiels) is a promontory in the eastern corner of Luxembourg City's historical upper town, the Ville Haute. It was here that Count Siegfried built his Castle of Lucilinburhuc in 963, providing a basis for the development of the town that became Luxembourg. Over the centuries, the Bock and the surrounding defenses were reinforced, attacked, and rebuilt time and time again, as the armies of the Burgundians, Habsburgs, Spaniards, Prussians, and French vied for victory over one of Europe's most strategic strongholds, the Fortress of Luxembourg. Warring did not stop until the Treaty of London was signed in 1867, calling for the demolition of the fortifications. Ruins of the old castle and the vast underground system of passages and galleries known as the casemates continue to be a major tourist attraction.

== History ==
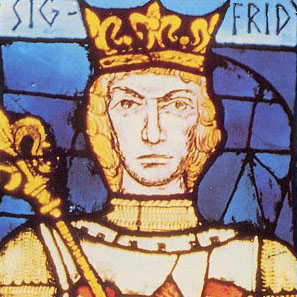
Count Siegfried of Luxembourg

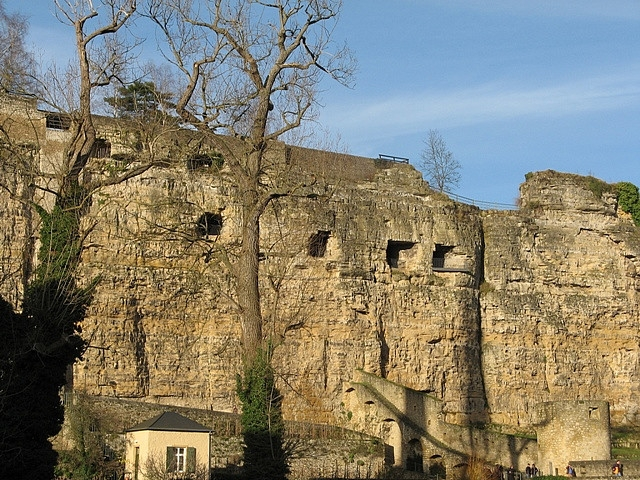
The Bock cliff with loop-holes for the cannons

Although the earliest dwellings and fortifications on the Bock rock promontory may well be from Roman times, both they and the subsequent Frankish inhabitants of the region have left only scant archeological evidence of their presence. The first historical mention of the Bock is in connection with a watchtower or fortification in the vicinity of the Fish Market where two major Roman roads (Reims-Trier and Metz-Liège) used to cross. The Roman road from Reims to Trier was ceded by Charles Martel, Duke of the Franks, to the Abbey of St Maximin in Trier in 723.

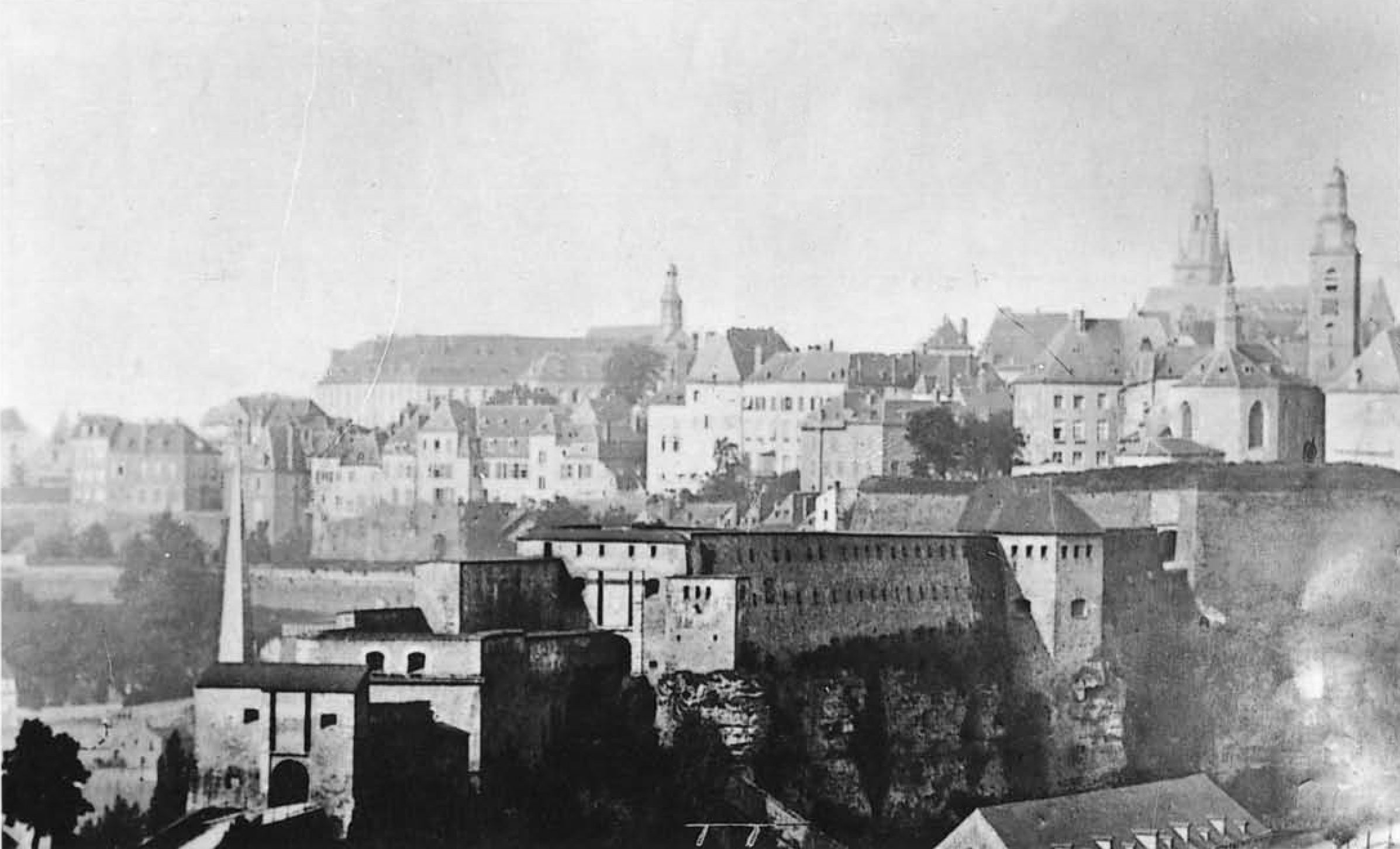
Photograph of the four Bock gates (c. 1867)

Two centuries later, Count Siegfried was looking for a location for a castle to serve as a central defensive point for his holdings in Feulen, Hosingen and Monnerich in the Pagus Wabrensis, in Sarreburg, Berncastel and Roussy in the Pagus Mosellanus" regions.

After failing to obtain a site near the Abbey of Stavelot (now in the Belgian province of Liège), he approached the Abbot of St Maximin's to purchase "the castle which is called Lucilinburhuc" (castellum quod dicitur Lucilinburhuc) on the Bock cliff above the Alzette River, in exchange for the land he owned at Feulen in the Ardennes to the north. After the consent of Emperor Otto I had been obtained, the deed was signed by Viker, Abbot of St Maximin's, on 7 April 963.

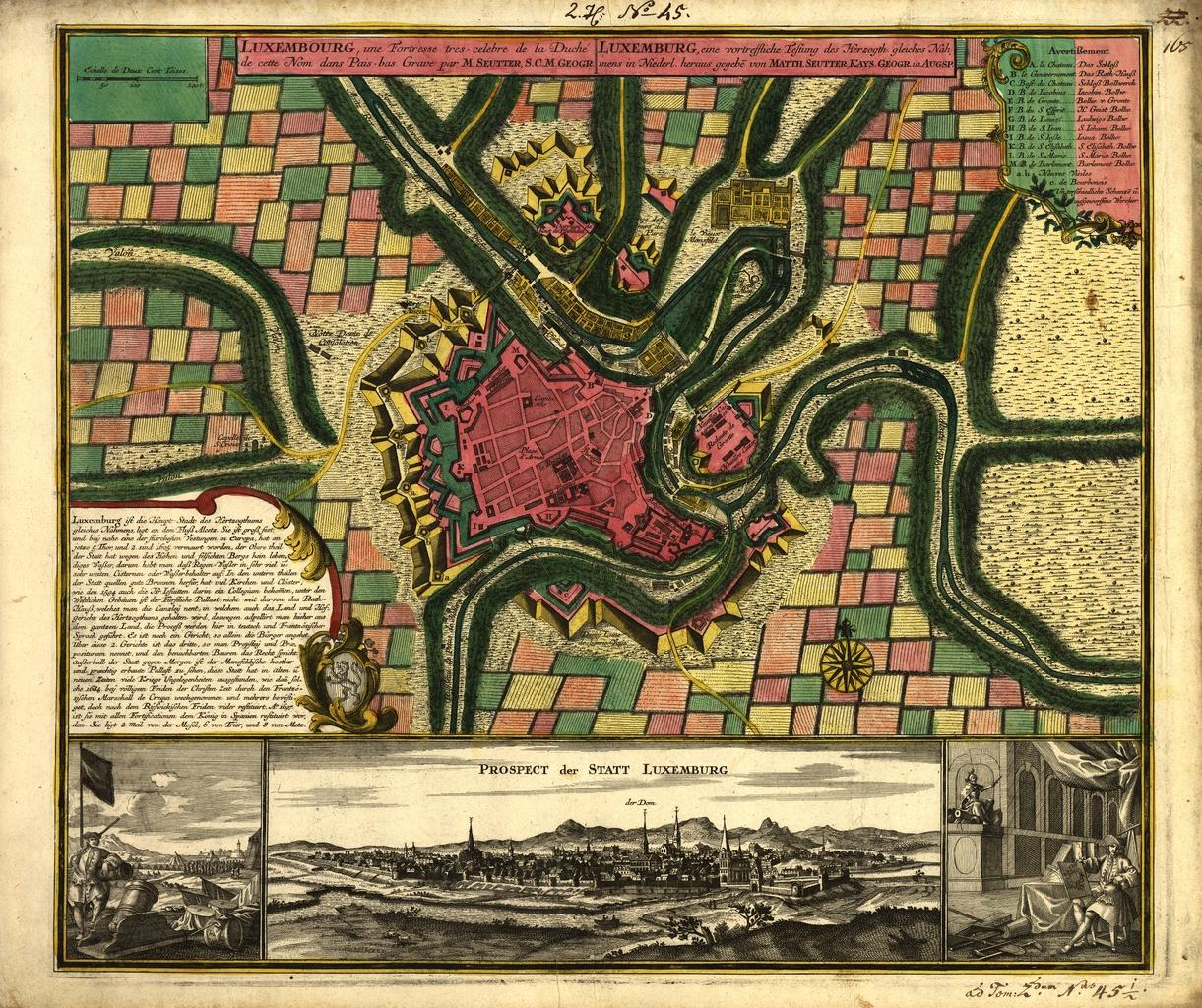
Map of Luxembourg by Matteus Seuter (c. 1730)

Over the centuries, the castle on the Bock was enlarged considerably and additional walls and defences were erected. In 987, the castle chapel was built at the nearby Fish Market, in the location where St Michael's Church stands today. Under Conrad I, the castle became the residence of the Counts of Luxembourg. It was damaged, destroyed, captured and rebuilt by the Burgundians in 1473, the Habsburgs in 1477, and the Spaniards in 1555.

As time passed, the fortifications needed to be adapted to the technological advances in warfare, especially the increasingly stronger firepower. Under the Spaniards in the 1640s, the Swiss engineer Isaac von Treybach significantly reworked the defences. The Bock was also strengthened with three fortresses: the Large Bock, Middle Bock and Small Bock (from west to east), separated from each other by cuts in the rock and linked by bridges. As a result, little remained of the medieval castle.

In 1684, on behalf of Louis XIV, Vauban succeeded in capturing the city of Luxembourg during a month-long siege in which the Bock fortifications were completely flattened. Vauban, perhaps the most competent fortification engineer of his day, then undertook major additions to the defences, realizing that underground passages and chambers were just as important as the surface installations. The Large Bock, connected to the old town by the Pont du Château, was further reinforced. Enclosed by a wall 12 m (39 ft) high, it was the major component of the new fortress.

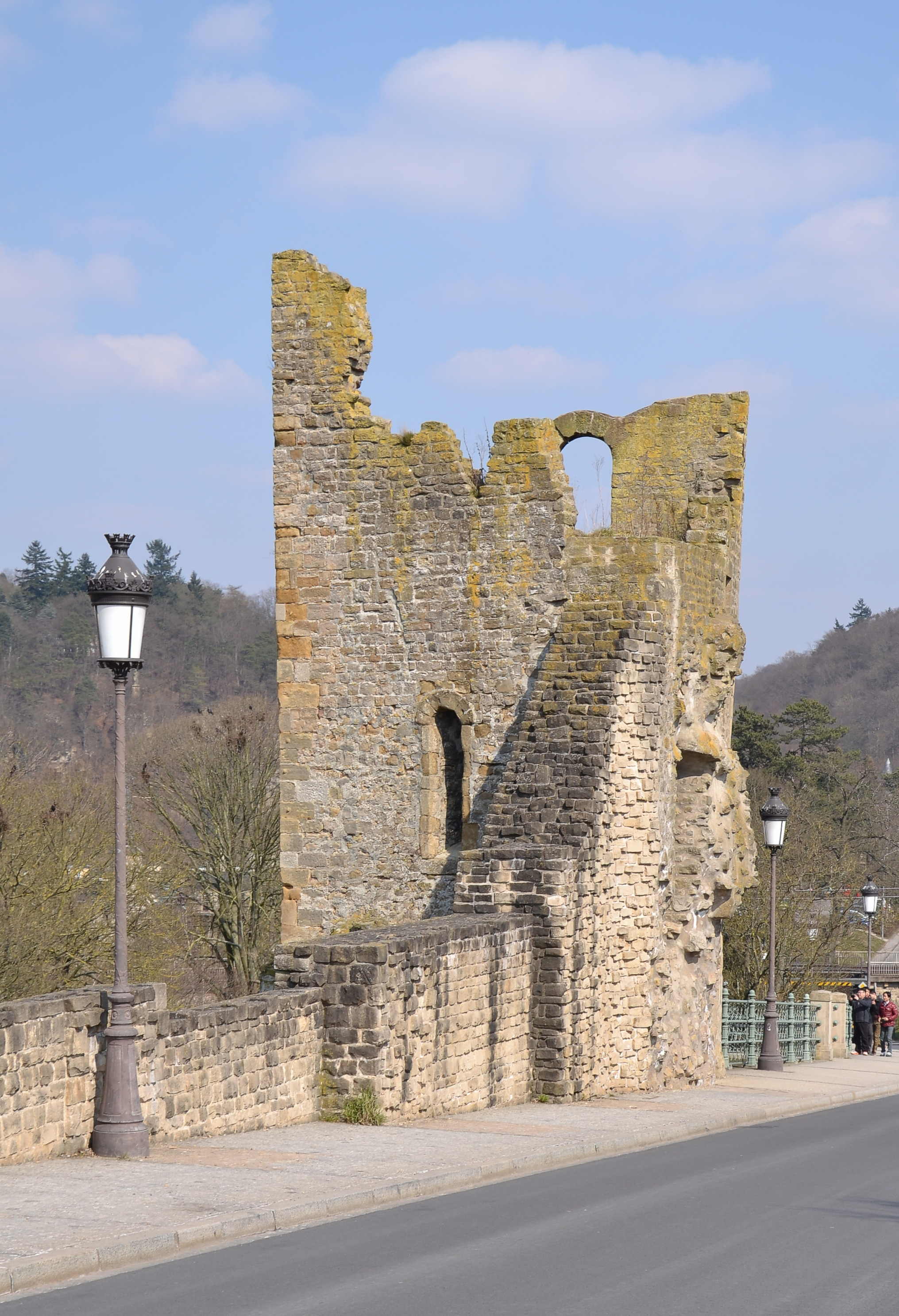
The "Hollow Tooth" ruin

In addition to these structures, the Bock also included a system of casemates, which originated in the cellars of the medieval castle. In 1744, during the Austrian period, these underground passages were enlarged considerably by General Neipperg. The main passage, which still remains, is 110 m long and up to 7 m wide. Branches leading off on either side were equipped with no less than 25 cannon emplacements (12 to the north and 13 to the south), offering considerable firepower. In the event of war, the Bock casemates, covering an area of 1,100 m^{2}, could be used as barracks for up to 1200 soldiers. Water was supplied from an internal well 47 m deep.

During the late 18th-century French Revolutionary Wars, the city held out against a French siege for seven months. When the garrison finally surrendered, the walls were still unbreached. This led the French politician and engineer Lazare Carnot to call the Luxembourg fortress "the best in the world, apart from Gibraltar". As a result, it has often been called the Gibraltar of the North.

The fortifications were finally demolished under the terms of the Treaty of London in 1867. The demolition took 16 years and cost the enormous sum of 1.5 million gold francs.

== Pont du château ==
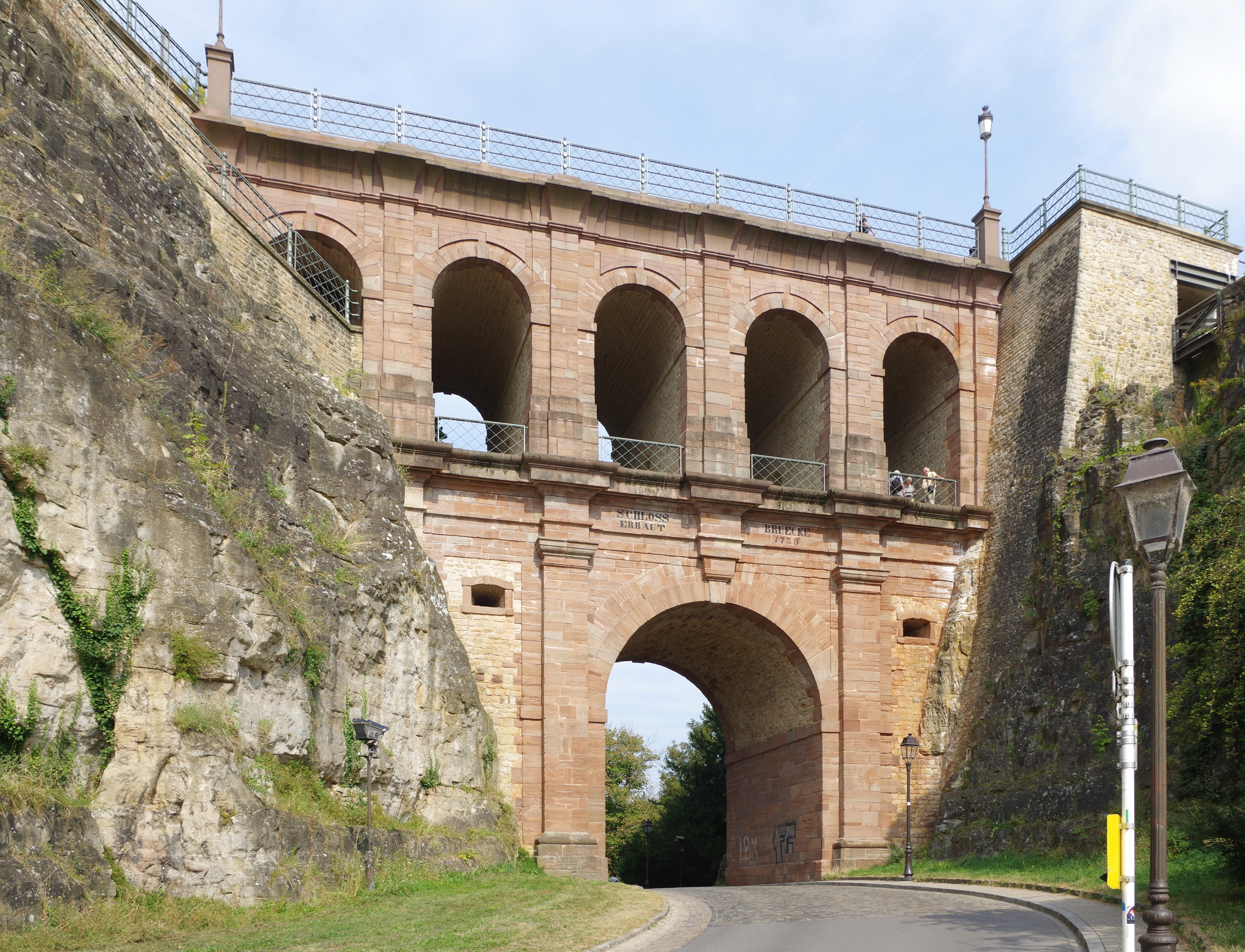
The Pont du château

The two-storey bridge connecting the Bock to the old town was an important component of the fortifications. Technically, it is a rather curious structure. Built in 1735 by the Austrians, it provides no less than four ways of crossing between the cliffs: the road over the top, a passage by way of the four upper arches, a spiral staircase up through the main arch, and a tunnel under the road at the bottom.

== Famous visitors ==
Over the years, the Bock casemates have received several famous visitors. These include:

- Emperor Joseph II of Austria (1781);
- Napoleon Bonaparte (1804);
- Prince Henry of the Netherlands (1868);
- Grand Duchess Charlotte of Luxembourg (1936);
- Grand Duke Henri of Luxembourg and his wife Grand Duchess Maria Teresa (2000).

== The legend of Melusina ==
There have reportedly been people that have seen Melusine in the waters nearby.

== See also ==
- Luxembourg City
- History of Luxembourg

== Gallery ==
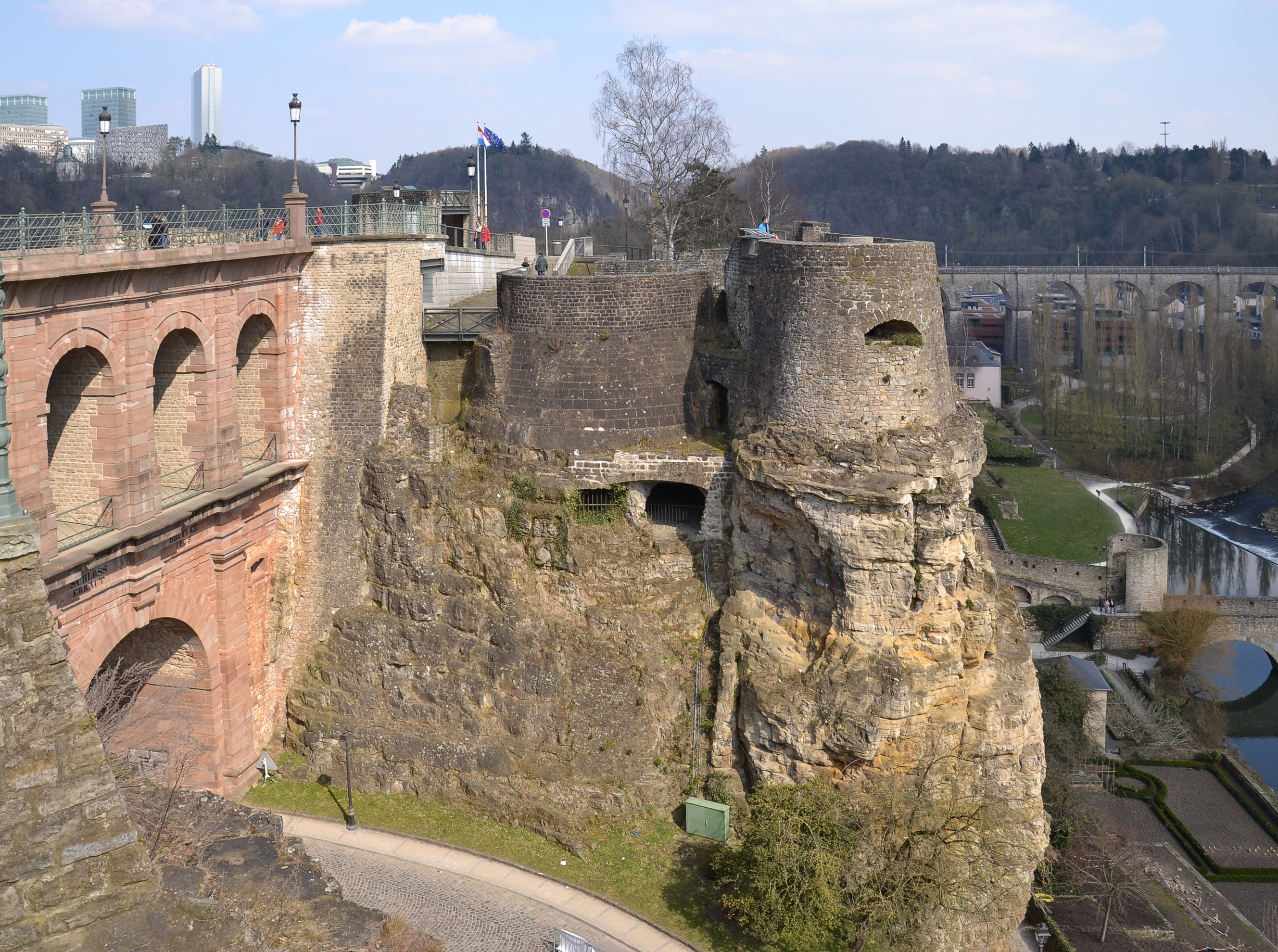
The Bock fortifications

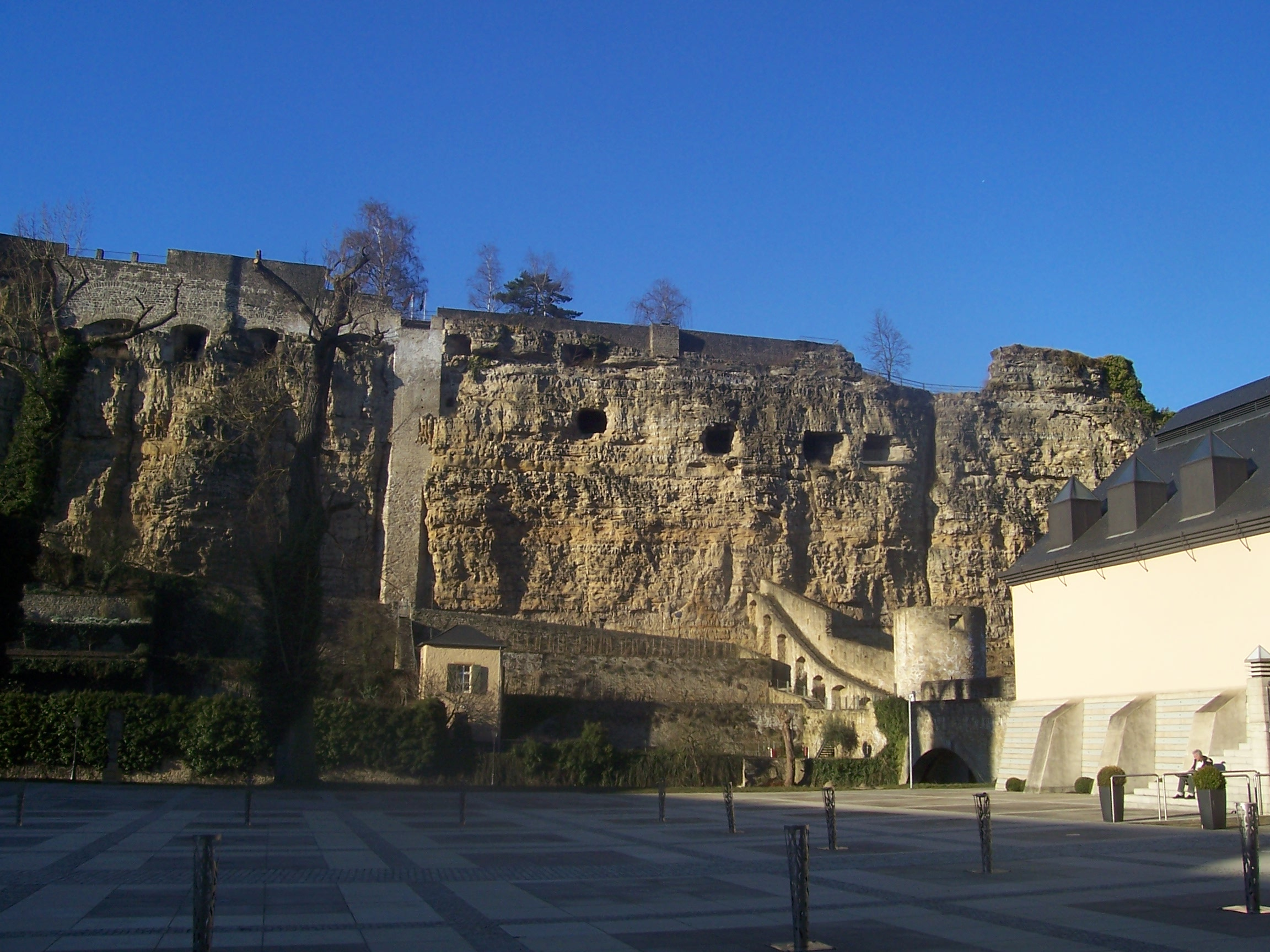
The Bock cliff with cannon loopholes

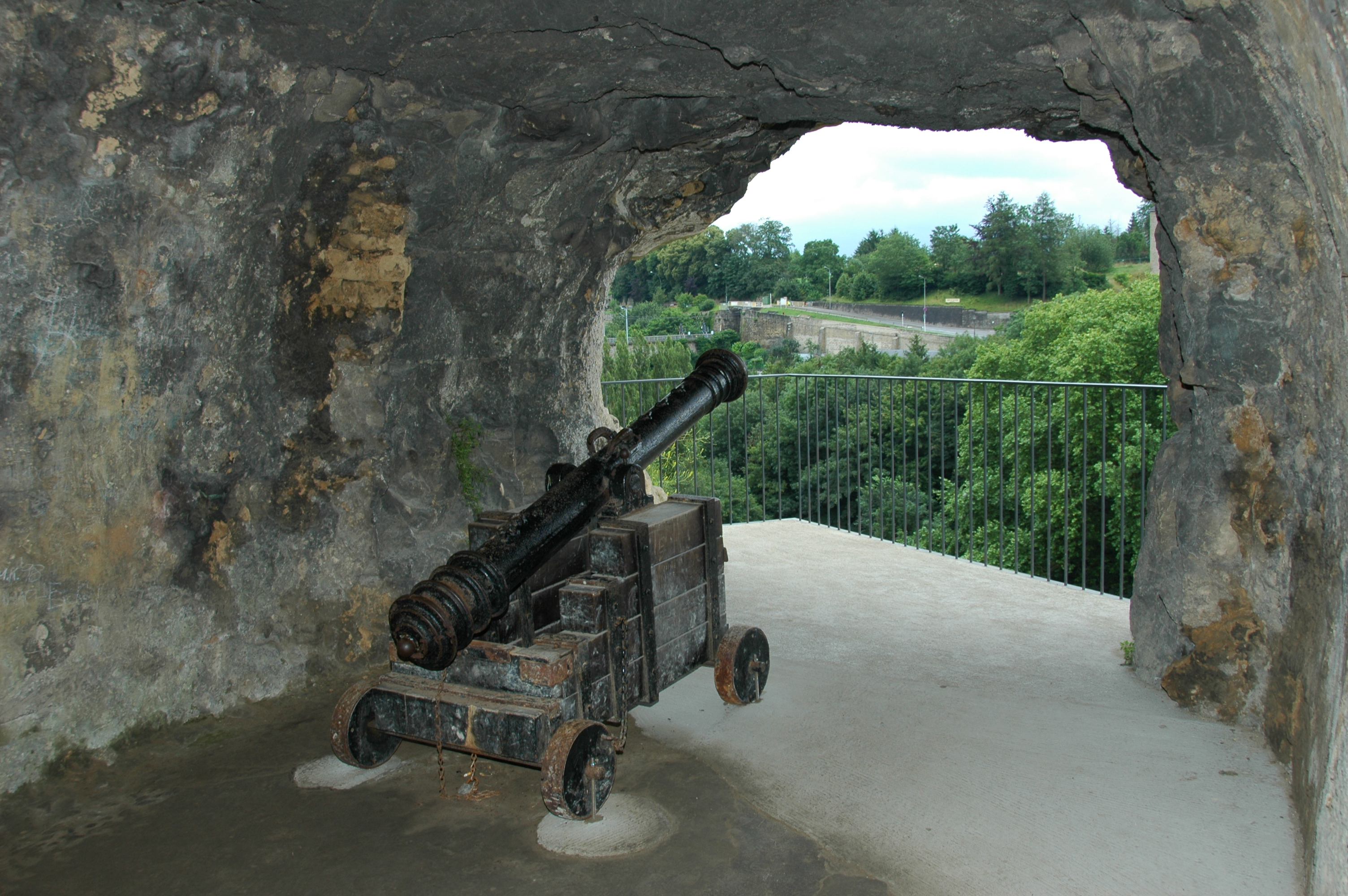
Cannon inside the casemates

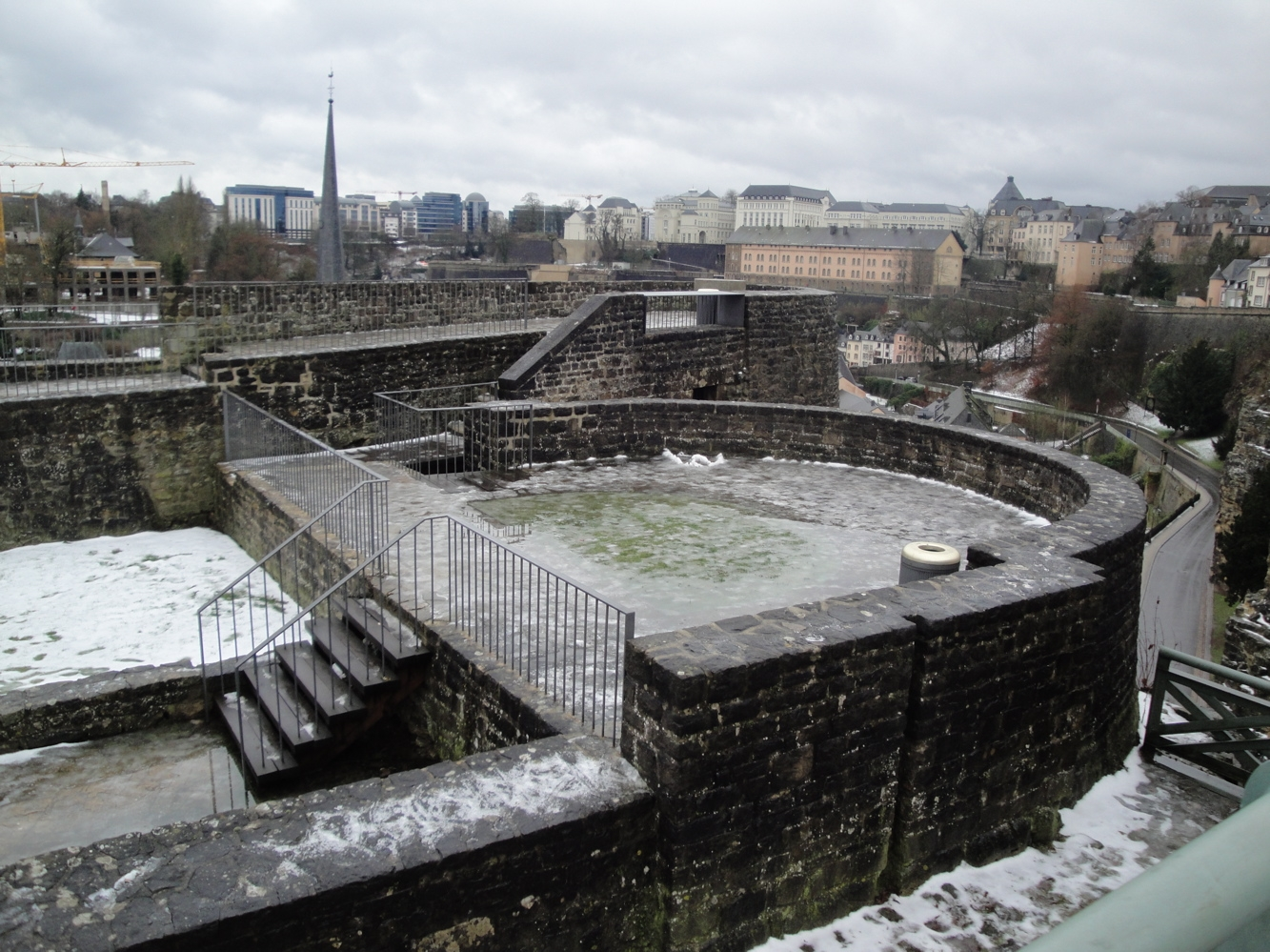
The Bock fortifications in the winter

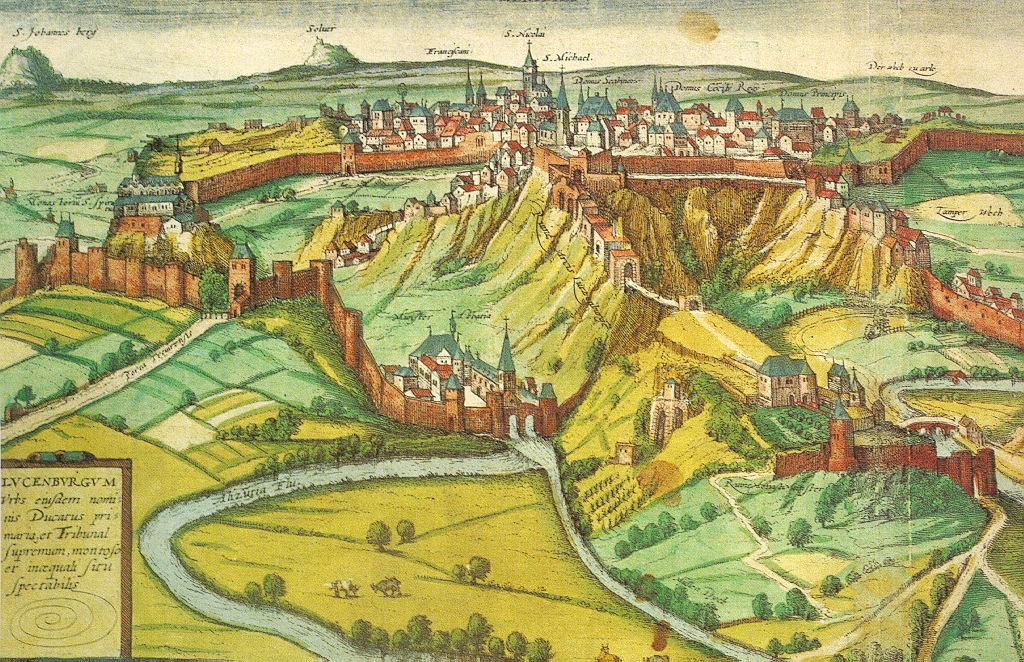
Luxembourg by Joan Blaeu (1649)

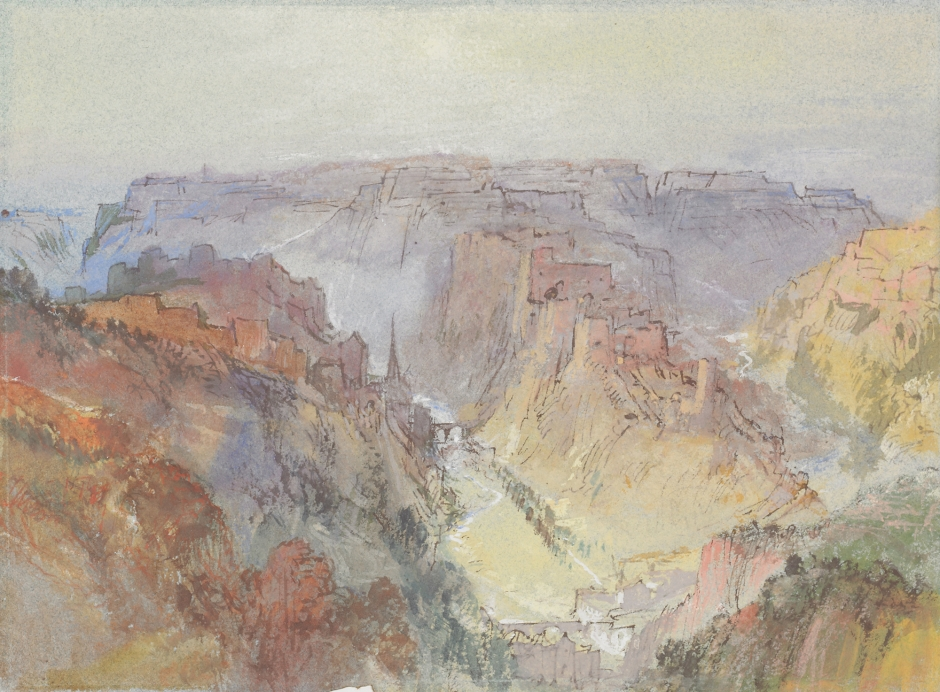
Luxembourg by William Turner (1834)

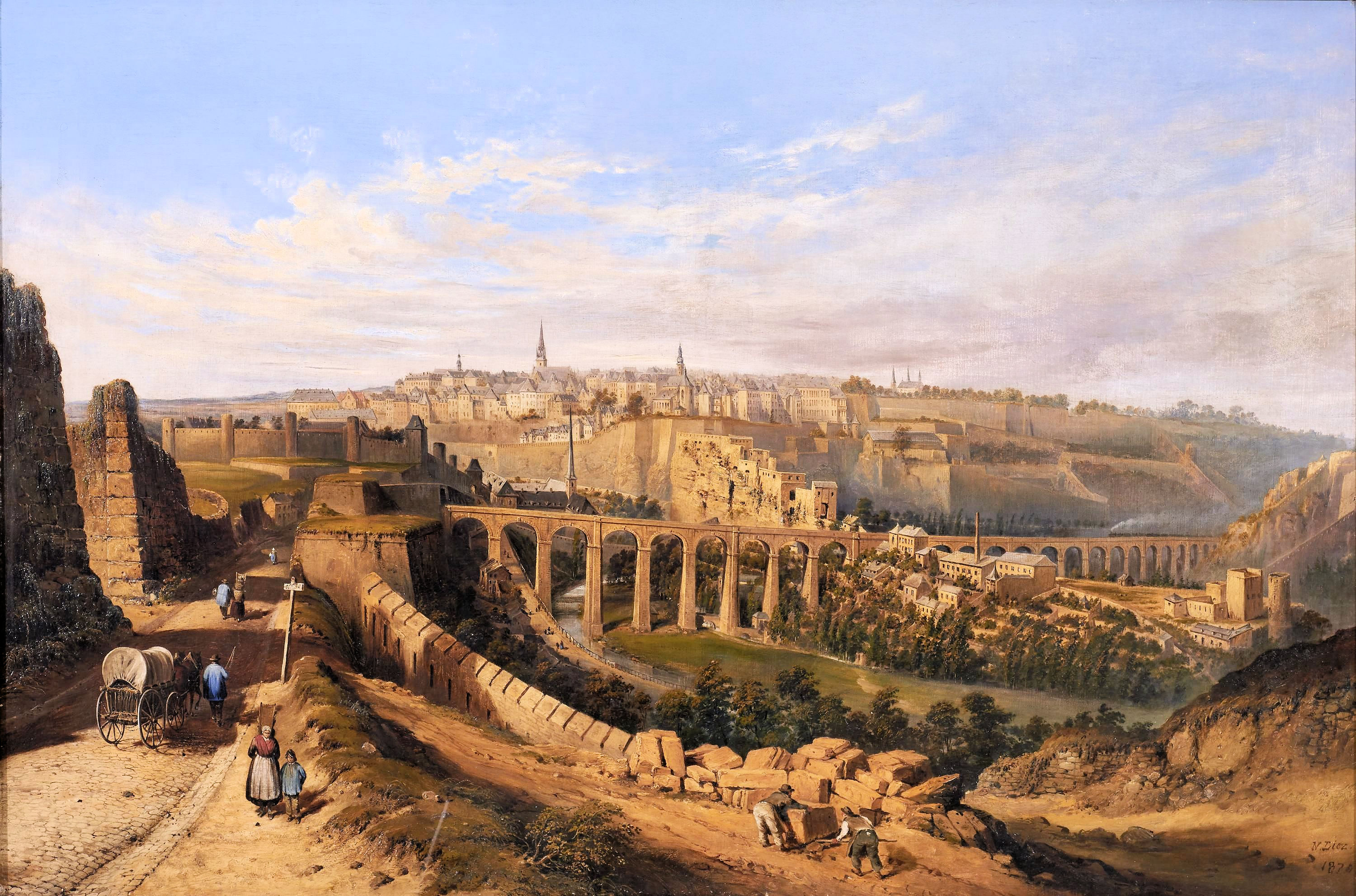
Luxembourg by Nicolas Liez (1870)

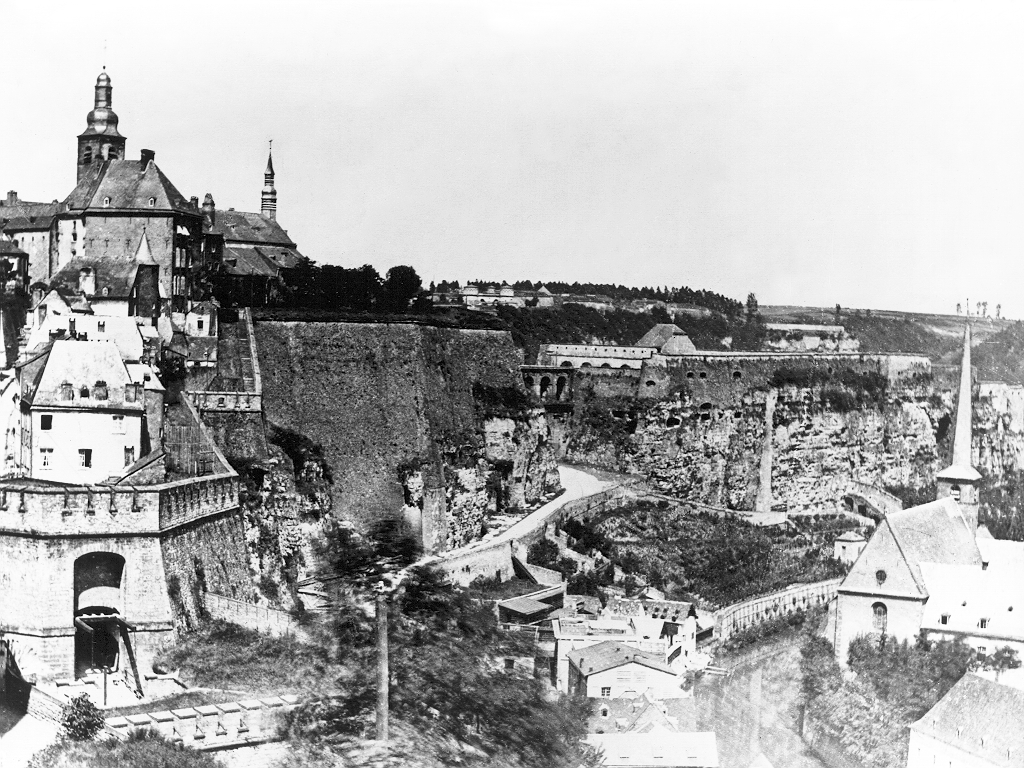
The Luxembourg fortress before demolition in 1867
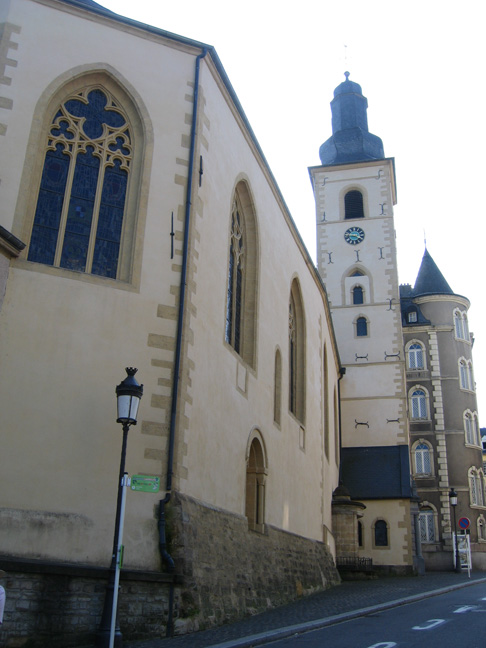
St Michael's Church, once the castle chapel

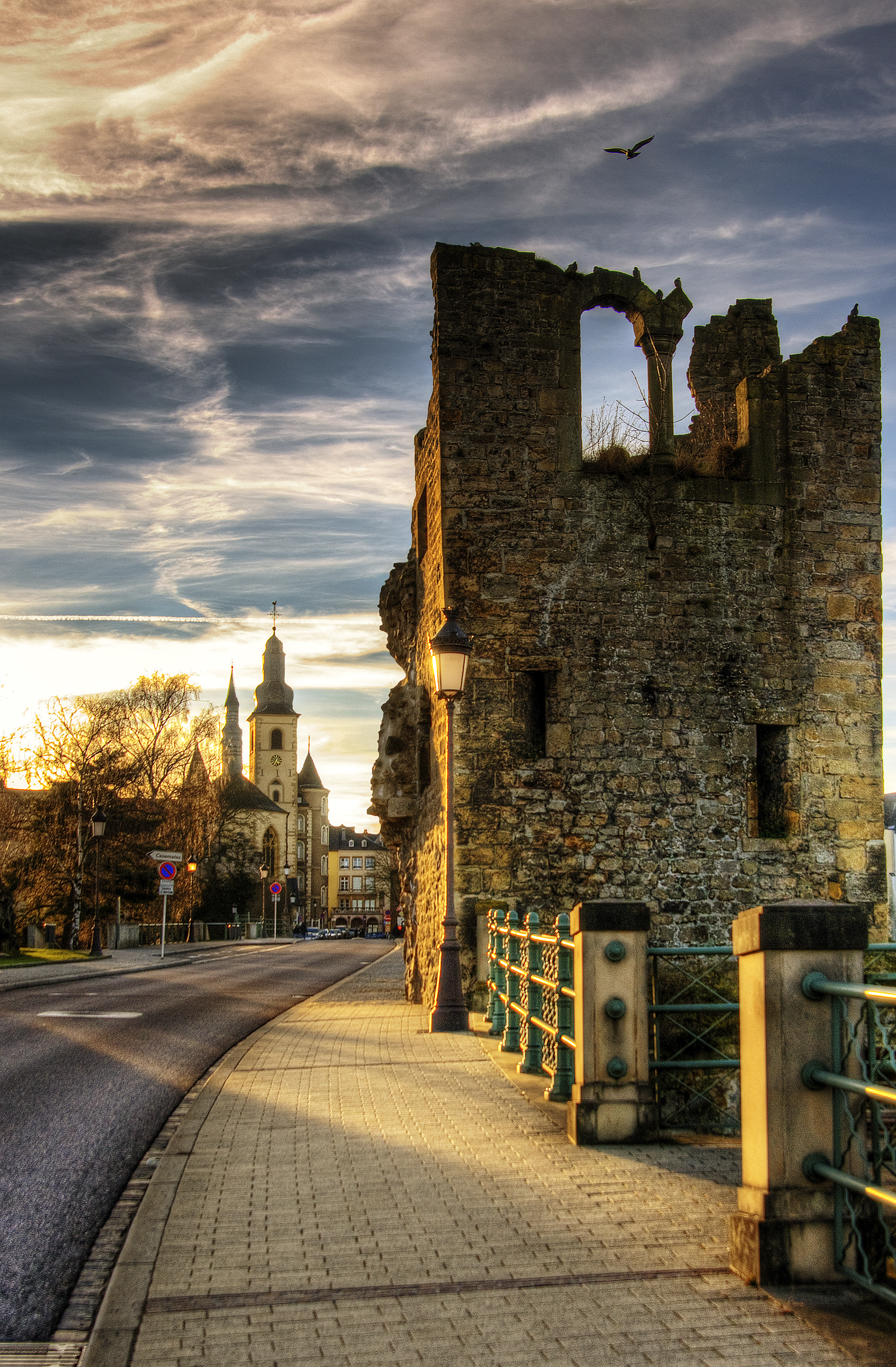
The "Hollow Tooth" tower with Saint Michael's Church in the background
