= Adelaide, Abbess of Vilich =

Abbess of Vilich and Christian saint (c. 970 – c. 1015)

Saint Adelaide of Vilich
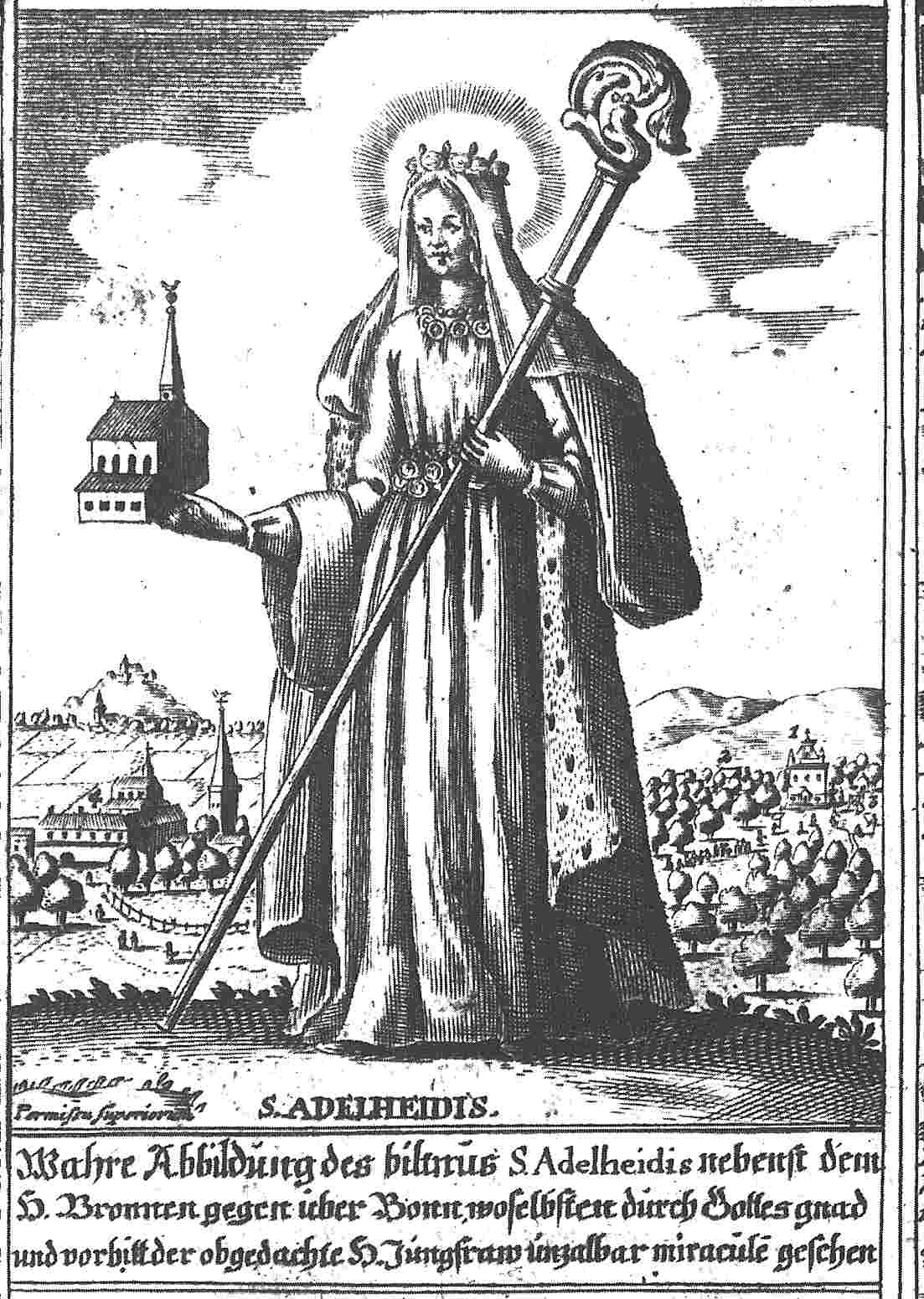
- Adelaide, Abbess of Vilich, detail from a pilgrim sheet, 1718

Abbess of Vilich
- Born: c. 970
- Died: 5 February 1015; Cologne, Germany
- Venerated in: Catholic Church, Eastern Orthodox Church
- Canonized: 27 January 1966
- Feast: 5 February

Adelaide, Abbess of Vilich (c. 970 – 5 February 1015(?), her date of birth and death are controversial), also known as Adelheid, was the abbess of Vilich and also of St. Maria im Kapitol in Cologne. She was considered a saint by some; miracles are ascribed to her. She was descended from the German king Henry the Fowler. Her parents founded the convent at Vilich in which she became abbess.

== Life ==
Adelaide was born around 970, the youngest daughter of Megengoz, Count of Geldern, and his wife Gerberga. As a child, she was given to the convent of St. Ursula in Cologne, probably before 977, where she was educated according to the Rule of St. Jerome, and engaged in philosophical studies, according to her Vita. When her older brother Godfrey died in battle in 977, her parents began funding the construction of a church in his honour at Vilich (today part of Bonn-Beuel) and worked to establish a female monastic community following the rule of the observances of the canonesses. As part of this process, they redeemed their daughter from St Ursula with a gift of land and established her as abbess of the newly founded community at Vilich.

To determine Vilich's legal position in the empire, her parents appealed to emperor Otto III in 987 to obtain a charter granting Vilich the same legal status as the imperial convents of Gandersheim, Quedlinburg, and Essen. This charter was confirmed by a papal bull from Pope Gregory VI, dated 24 May 996.

Due to the death of her mother Geberga in c. 995, Adelaide was forced to lead the convent by herself. She used this position of power to change the rule followed in Vilich to the Rule of Saint Benedict; some canonesses left Vilich as a result. Three years after Gerberga's death, Adelaide's father Megengoz died as well. He was buried alongside his wife at Vilich. Adelaide inherited a large part of the family's wealth.

In c.1000, Adelaide's sister Bertrada, abbess of St. Mary in the Capitol died. Archbishop Heribert of Cologne expressed wishes for Adelaide to assume responsibility for the abbey. Adelaide was subsequently called to the court and confirmed as abbess of St. Mary's. Adelaide's charitable became well known in Cologne. Her favourable reputation increased after bad harvests in the following years, during which Adelaide cared for the people in Cologne. While her relationship with Archbishop Heribert is described by the vita as one of caritas, the sisters at Vilich are depicted as feeling neglected due to Adelaide spending time in Cologne.

On 5 February of an unknown year, Adelaide died of a sore throat in the company of her friend Archbishop Heribert. Her sisters from Vilich did not believe a message describing Adelaide's illness and arrived after she had died. Archbishop Heribert wished for Adelaide to be buried in Cologne, but the sisters persuaded him to have her buried in Vilich.

== Sources ==
One of the main sources of Adelaide's life is the Vita Adelheidis virginis. It was written around 1057 by Bertha with the aid of contemporary witnesses. Bertha appears to have written the Vita before entering the convent of Vilich. In the Vita of Bertha's brother, Wolfhelm, it is documented that Bertha wrote the Vita Adelheidis alongside other vitae.

Much information from the vita is supported by different charters; mainly by a charter from 944, in which Otto I. restores Megingoz's property, and by a charter from 987 by which Otto III. grants the Abbey of Vilich the status of Reichsstift (imperial convent).

== Veneration ==
During her term of office, the region around Cologne was affected by famines. Therefore, she prayed for the poorest and as a result, a source of water arose in the district of Pützchen in modern-day Bonn. The source was transformed into a well and it became an important pilgrimage destination for the worship of Adelheid. This fountain has been preserved until today; every year in September, there is a pilgrimage in veneration of Adelheid. In 1641, her grave in the Vilicher Stiftskirche was opened and it was empty. After this discovery, the number of pilgrims fell sharply, but every year a few relics were and still are shown to the public.

Besides this well, some other miracles have been recorded, which are supposed to have taken place at her grave. Adelaide was declared Servant of God on 22 November 1922, and canonized by Pope Paul VI on 27 January 1966. As her day of death, the 5th of February was confirmed as the official day of her remembrance and feast day.

Even today, several churches and monasteries in Bonn and Cologne, as well as several schools, are named after her. On 8 September 2008 Adelaide was proclaimed the third city patron saint of Bonn.

== See also ==
- Catholic Church in Germany
- List of Catholic saints
