= Vilich Abbey =

Coordinates: 50°45′10″N 7°7′40″E

The Vilich Abbey (German St. Adelheidis Stift) is a former monastery located in North Rhine-Westphalia. It is named after the canonized Adelaide of Vilich, who lived from 970 to 1015. After her death, a cult formed around her and the convent. The convent was terminated in 1804 due to secularization. It was destroyed during the Thirty Years' war and rebuilt. The Franciscans took over the abbey as a hospital in 1865, followed by many different charitable institutions. The church was destroyed in World War II and once again restored, and is now used as a retirement home.

== History ==
The married couple Megingoz of Guelders and Gerberga, granddaughter of Charles the Simple, founded the convent of Vilich. A small church already existed in the 8th and 9th century, and the convent was founded at the end of the 10th century. The couple's only son Gottfried died in 976/977, in the crusade in Bohemia under Otto II, and they built the church to commemorate his death.

=== Formation of the convent ===
The convent was dedicated to the patrons Cornelius and Cyprian. In 977, Adelaide of Vilich, the youngest daughter of Megengoz and Gerberga, joined the convent at a young age. Her mother decided to redeem her from the St. Ursula convent in Cologne, in which she had lived as a canoness, with a gift of land. Due to that, Adelaide was able to become the first abbess of Vilich.

In 987, Megengoz and his wife Gerberga appealed to the government for a charter for the newly formed convent. A charter of immunities was issued by Otto III. This charter granted the convent of Vilich all the privileges and protections, as well as legal freedom similar to the imperial convents of Gandersheim, Quedlinburg and Essen. With this charter, the convent had the right to freely elect an abbess and that no advocate could intrude without the permission of the abbess and the congregation. These charters and other pertaining to the abbey are found in the Staatsarchiv in Düsseldorf today.

=== Monastery ===
Gerberga first wanted to make the church a Benedictine nunnery, but Adelaide resisted, and the convent started out to be a community of canonesses. In 995, Gerberga died and Adelaide decided to change the rule of the abbey from the observances of canonesses to the rule of St. Benedict. Her chapter did not altogether agree with the adaption of the Benedictine rule, but she eventually turned Vilich into a Benedictine nunnery.

Mathilde, daughter of Ezzo, Count Palatine of Lotharinga, was the successor of Adelaide, after Adelaide had died in 1015. Mathilde took over as abbess of the St. Peters convent. Henry IV. grants Anno II, the archbishop of cologne, the convent of Vilich. Conrad III. confirmed the property and wealth of the church and attested that the nuns in Vilich still lived under the rule of St. Benedict with a law in 1144.

In the 12th century, a less strict monastic rule was adapted. The convent lost its legal freedom in the 13th century.

=== Secularization ===
The convent was terminated in 1804 due to secularization. Destructions and burnings happened to the church during the Thirty Years' war. The relict of Adelaide got lost in that time. In 1642/3, the church was rebuilt. The facilities were rented to private individuals in the 19th century. The Franciscans took the former abbey over as a hospital in 1865, and in 1908 it was gifted to the Cellitinnen. In the following years, many different charitable institutions used the property. In 1944, the church was destroyed due to bombings in World War II. The building was restored again. Today, the building is used as a retiring home, the reconstruction for that was completed in 2001.
