= Adalbero I of Metz =

Bishop of Metz from 929 till 954 (died 962)

Adalbero I of Metz Adalbero of Bar
- Bishop of Metz (929-962); Abbot of Sint-Truiden (944-962)
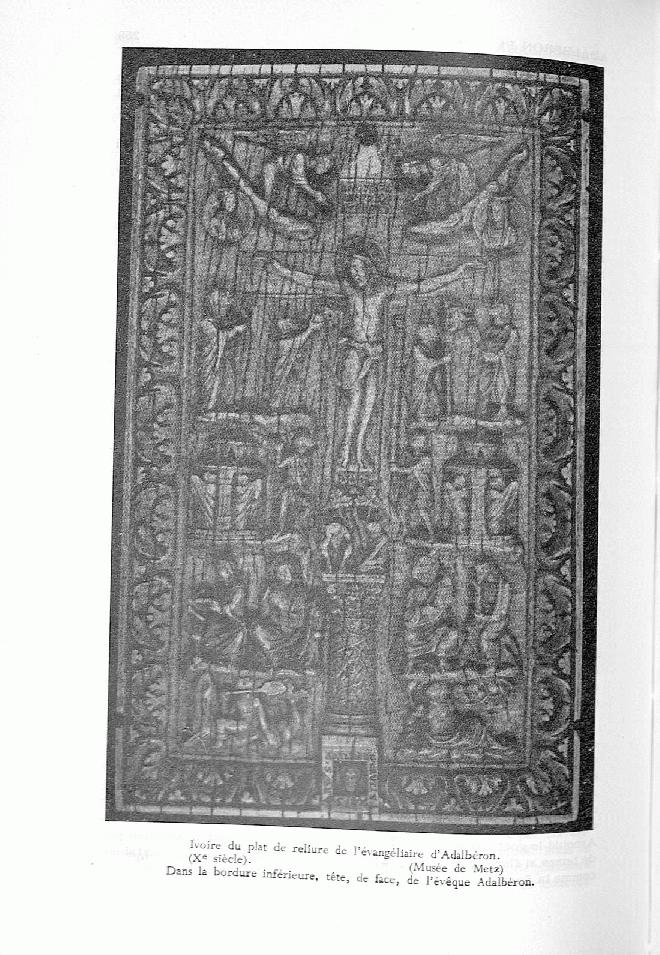
- Cover of the evangeliary of Adalbero
- Church: Catholic
- See: Prince-Bishopric of Metz
- Predecessor: Benno of Einsiedeln
- Successor: Dietrich I of Metz

Personal details
- Died: 26 April 962 Sint-Truiden

Adalbero I (French: Adalbéron; died ?26 April 962) was the bishop of Metz from 929 till 954.

Also known as Adalber of Bar or Adalber of Ardenne, he became Abbot of Sint-Truiden in 944, presiding over a period of overdue rebuilding and expansion of a monastery which had been devastated by Normans during the closing decades of the previous century.

== Life ==
=== Provenance ===
Adalbero came from one of the leading families in the area. He was a son of Wigeric, Count palatine of Lotharingia by the Count's marriage to Cunigunda, ancestors of the powerful Ardennes-Verdun dynasty. Adelbero's older brother was Frederick I, Count of Bar and Duke of Upper Lorraine. Another brother was Sigfried, Count of Ardennes. His mother, Cunigunda, was a granddaughter of Louis II of France, and therefore a descendant of Charlemagne. La Vita Johannis Gorziensis, written in 980, indicates that he was of royal descent through both his paternal and maternal lines, though the text spells out that the connection went back "several" generations.

=== Bishop ===
In 929 Adalbero was elected by the clergy and the people to succeed Benneon of Metz whose own episcopal term had recently ended badly.

As Bishop of Metz, Adalbero's enthusiastic promotion of a revival in monasticism gained him the soubriquet "father of the monks". He encouraged the rebuilding of monastic buildings that had fallen into disrepair during preceding decades and the expansion of monastic properties. Starting in 933/934 he became a driving force behind the revival of Gorze Abbey, appointing the energetic Abbot John to lead the project on site. Gorze then became a famous exemplar for similar monastic recoveries elsewhere in the region during the middle and later years of the tenth century.

In 941 he expelled the canons (monks) from the Abbey of Saint-Arnould in Metz, and replaced them with monks imported from Gorze, who lived according to the Rule of Saint Benedict under their new abbot, Héribert (also recruited from Gorze).

It is recorded that Adalbero later returned to Archbishop Bruno of Cologne, the piece of St Peter's ferula (staff), a treasured relic which had been sent across to Metz at the time of the Hunnish invasions.

It is possible that Adelbero was relieved of his duties as Bishop of Metz by Duke Conrad the Red in 954, leaving him free to concentrate on his duties at Sint-Truiden until his death in 962. On the other hand, Duke Conrad was killed in battle in 955, and there are no indications of any successor bishop having been appointed at Metz till after Adalbero's death.

=== Abbot ===
In 944 Adalbero expelled Abbot Reinier from Sint-Truiden Abbey on account of the latter's "poor conduct", and was himself elected Abbot of Sint-Truiden (St. Trond) in Renier's stead. Although he retained his episcopal title till his death, it seems that from the middle 940s he tried to divide his duties equally between the two locations. At Sint-Truiden the Abbey was almost entirely rebuilt, now on a very grand scale. Monasteric lands that had been usurped by local nobility were restored, as was monastic observance.

In 947 he was able to consecrate the new abbey church.

=== Politics ===
In the wars that divided Louis IV of France and Otto I of Germany in the 930s, Adalbero took the side of Louis in the contest to determine which of these heirs of Charlemagne should have control over Lorraine. He energetically defended his episcopal city from the German armies. However, when the belligerents concluded their differences in 939 he was obliged to open the gates of Metz to soldiers from the Ottonian side.

In 950 Adalbero intervened as a mediator in the conflict between Louis IV of France and Hugh, Count of Paris.

In 968, several years after Adalbero's death, the emperor mentioned Adalbero in a charter in which he described Adalbero using the adjective "sanctissimus" ("very holy"). The fact that Adalbero's memory was cherished by Emperor Otto adds weight to the suspicion that any removal of his rights and duties as Bishop undertaken by Duke Conrad the Red in 954 (by which date Conrad was in rebellion against Otto) is unlikely to have been permanent.

== Death ==
According to the episcopal records at Metz, Adalbero died on 26 April 962. Records at Sint-Truiden give his date of death as 23 February 964. There are also certain history books giving the year of his death as 960.

His body was taken to Gorze and then to the Abbey of Saint-Arnould in Metz where it became the object of much veneration.
