= Henry the Fowler =

King of East Francia from 919 to 936

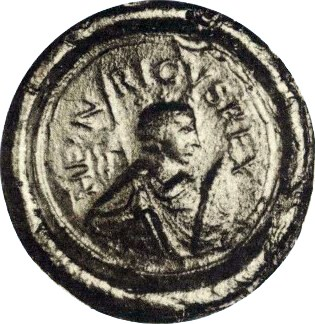
- Henry's seal from a document of 30 March 925. He is portrayed as a warrior, with a spear and shield. The words are HEINRICUS REX (King Henry).

King of East Francia
- Reign: c. 24 May 919 – 2 July 936
- Coronation: c. 24 May 919
- Predecessor: Conrad the Younger
- Successor: Otto the Great

Duke of Saxony
- Reign: 30 November 912 – 2 July 936
- Predecessor: Otto the Illustrious
- Successor: Otto the Great
- Born: c. 7 July 876; Mimileba, East Francia
- Died: 2 July 936 (aged 59–60); Mimileba, East Francia
- Burial: Quedlinburg Abbey
- Spouse: Hatheburg of Merseburg; Matilda of Ringelheim
- Issue: Thankmar; Hedwig of Saxony; Otto I, Holy Roman Emperor; Gerberga, Queen of France; Henry I, Duke of Bavaria; Bruno the Great, Archbishop of Cologne
- Dynasty: Ottonian
- Father: Otto I, Duke of Saxony
- Mother: Hedwiga
- Religion: Chalcedonian Christianity

Henry the Fowler (German: Heinrich der Vogler or Heinrich der Finkler; Latin: Henricus Auceps or Henry I (German: Heinrich I.); c. 876 – 2 July 936) was the duke of Saxony from 912 and the king of East Francia from 919 until his death in 936. As the first non-Frankish king of East Francia, he established the Ottonian dynasty of kings and emperors, and he is generally considered to be the founder of the medieval German state, known until then as East Francia. An avid hunter, he obtained the epithet "the Fowler" because he was allegedly fixing his birding nets when messengers arrived to inform him that he was to be king.

He was born into the Liudolfing line of Saxon dukes. He succeeded to the dukedom when his father Otto I of Saxony died in 912. The new duke launched a rebellion against the king of East Francia, Conrad I, over the rights to lands in the Duchy of Thuringia. They reconciled in 915 and on his deathbed in 918, Conrad recommended Henry as the next king, considering the duke the only one who could hold the kingdom together in the face of internal revolts and external Magyar raids.

Henry was elected and crowned king in 919. He went on to defeat the rebellious dukes of Bavaria and Swabia, consolidating his rule. Through successful warfare and a dynastic marriage, Henry acquired Lotharingia as a vassal in 925. Unlike his Carolingian predecessors, Henry did not seek to create a centralized monarchy, ruling through federated autonomous stem duchies instead. Henry built an extensive system of fortifications and mobile heavy cavalry across Germany to neutralize the Magyar threat and in 933 routed them at the Battle of Riade, ending Magyar attacks for the next 21 years and giving rise to a sense of German nationhood. Henry greatly expanded German hegemony in Europe with his army's defeat of the Slavs in 929 at the Battle of Lenzen along the Elbe river, by compelling the submission of Duke Wenceslaus I of Bohemia through an invasion of the Duchy of Bohemia the same year and by conquering Danish realms in Schleswig in 934. Henry's hegemonic status north of the Alps was acknowledged by the kings Rudolph of West Francia and Rudolph II of Upper Burgundy, who both accepted a place of subordination as allies in 935. Henry planned an expedition to Rome to be crowned emperor by the pope, but the design was thwarted by his death. Henry prevented a collapse of royal power, as had happened in West Francia, and left a much stronger kingdom to his successor Otto I. He was buried at Quedlinburg Abbey, established by his wife Matilda in his honour.

== Family ==
Born in Memleben, in what is now Saxony-Anhalt, Henry was the son of Otto the Illustrious, Duke of Saxony. His mother, Hedwiga, was likely the daughter of Henry of Franconia and Ingeltrude, a great-granddaughter of Charlemagne.

In 906, he married Hatheburg of Merseburg, daughter of the Saxon count Erwin. She had previously been a nun. The marriage was annulled in 909 because her vows as a nun were deemed by the church to remain valid. She had already given birth to Henry's son Thankmar. The annulment placed a question mark over Thankmar's legitimacy. Later that year he married Matilda, daughter of Dietrich of Ringelheim, Count in Westphalia. Matilda bore him three sons and two daughters, Hedwig and Gerberga, and founded many religious institutions, including the Quedlinburg Abbey where Henry and Matilda are buried. She was later canonized.

His son Otto I, traditionally known as Otto the Great, continued his father's work of unifying all German tribes into a single kingdom and greatly expanded the king's powers. He installed members of his family in the kingdom's most important duchies, subjected the clergy to his personal control, defeated the Magyars and conquered the Kingdom of Italy.

== Rule ==
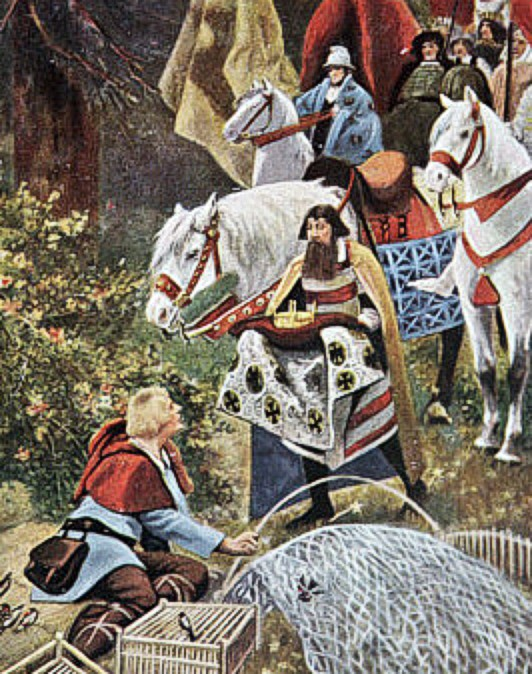
Legend of the German crown offered to Henry while fixing his birding nets, by Hermann Vogel (1854–1921)

Henry became Duke of Saxony after his father's death in 912. An able ruler, he continued to strengthen the position of his duchy within the weakening kingdom of East Francia, and was frequently in conflict with his neighbors to the South in the Duchy of Franconia.

On 23 December 918 Conrad I, king of East Francia and duke of Franconia, died. Although Henry had rebelled against Conrad I between 912 and 915 over the lands in Thuringia, Conrad recommended Henry as his successor. Kingship now changed from the Franks to the Saxons, who had suffered greatly during the conquests of Charlemagne and were proud of their identity. Henry, as Saxon, was the first non-Frank on the throne.

Conrad's choice was conveyed by his brother, duke Eberhard III of Franconia at the Diet of Fritzlar in 919. The assembled Franconian and Saxon nobles elected Henry to be king with other regional dukes not participating in the election. Archbishop Heriger of Mainz offered to anoint Henry according to the usual ceremony, but he refused – the only king of his time not to undergo that rite – allegedly because he wished to be king not by the church's but by the people's acclaim.

Henry, who was elected to kingship by only the Saxons and Franconians at Fritzlar, had to subdue the other dukes.

Duke Burchard II of Swabia soon swore fealty to the new king, but when he died, Henry appointed a noble from Franconia to be the new duke.

Duke Arnulf of Bavaria, lord over a realm of impressive extent, with de facto powers of a king and at times even named so in documents, proved a much harder nut to crack. He would not submit until Henry defeated him in two campaigns in 921.

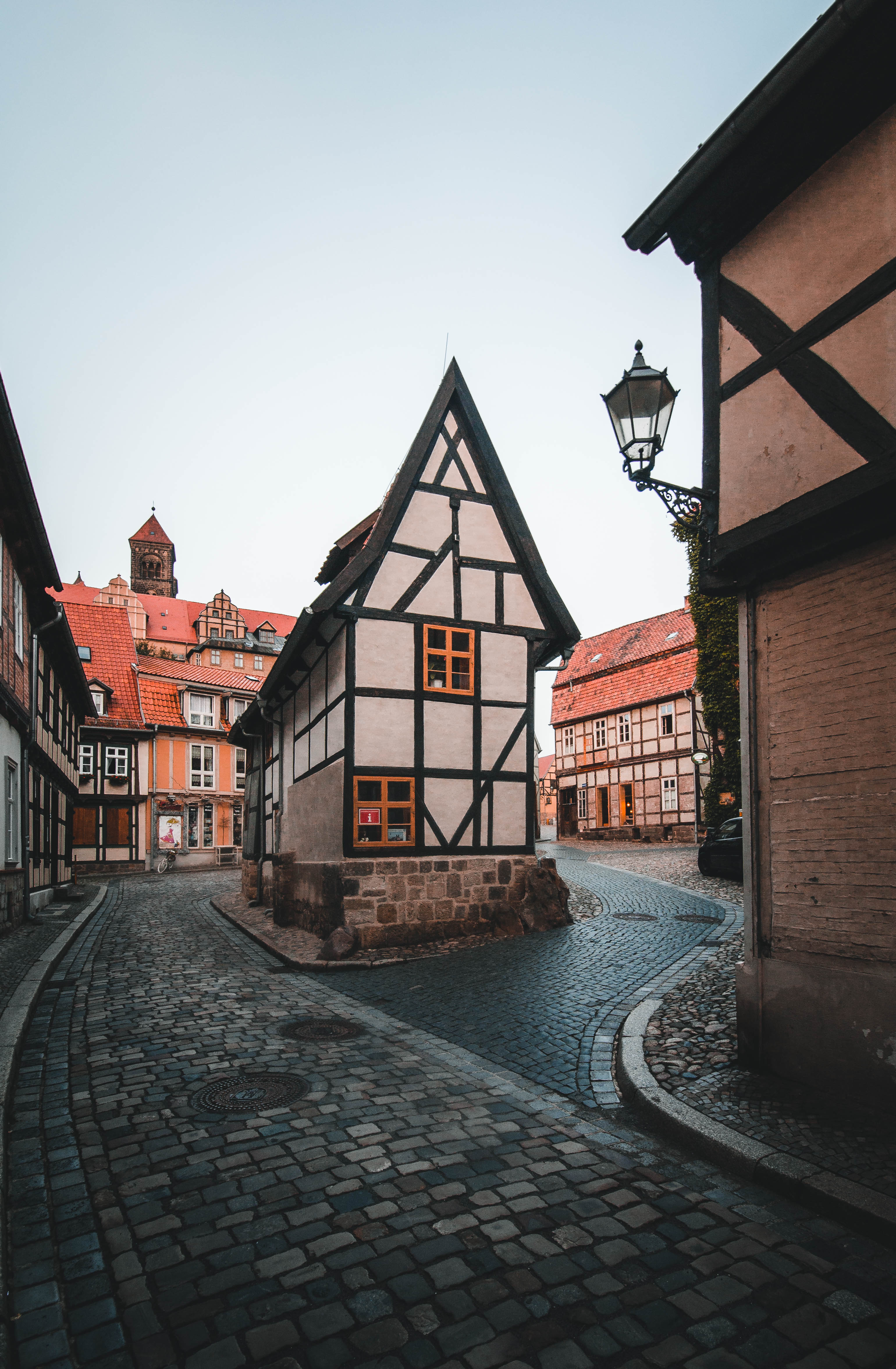
Finkenherd (finch trap) at Quedlinburg, built around 1530 at the legendary place of the king's bird trapping

In the short remnant of a more lengthy text, "Fragmentum de Arnulfo duce Bavariae (de)", the author gives a very lively impression of the disconcert Henry's claims caused in Bavaria: The piece abruptly starts with a clause. It relates that Henry I (Saxo Heimricus), following the advice of an unnamed bishop, had invaded the Bavarian kingdom (regnum Baioariae) in a hostile way. Decidedly, it hints at the unlawfulness of this encroachment, namely in that Bavaria was a territory in which none of Henry's forefathers had ever possessed even a foot (gressum pedis) of land. This was also the reason – by God's will (Dei nutu) – for him having been defeated in this first campaign. This can be seen as proof that Henry did campaign against Bavaria, and Arnulf, more than once. In the second chapter, the unknown chronicler hints that Henry's predecessor on the throne, Conrad I, had also invaded Bavaria in an equally unlawful and hostile (non regaliter, sed hostiliter) fashion. Conrad is said to have marauded through the land, murdering and pillaging, having made many children orphans (orphanos) and women widows (viduas). Ratisbon, the duke's seat, was set to light and looted. After Conrad committed all these crimes (peccatis), it reports that divine providence (divino nutu) forced him to withdraw. The reason for this is not mentioned. The last section is a eulogy to Duke Arnulf who is described as a glorious leader (gloriosus dux), being blessed by heaven (ex alto) with all kinds of virtues, brave and dynamic. He alone had saved his people from the scourge of the Saxons (de sevienti gladio paganorum) and given them back their freedom. This panegyric to the Bavarian duke is unparalleled for its time and underlines his position of power in the southeast of the East Frankish realm, so endangered by disintegration, so that "Arnulf ... nearly [found] the same resonance in the scarce historiography of his time, as did King Henry".

Henry besieged Arnulf's residence at Ratisbon and forced the duke into submission. Arnulf had crowned himself as king of Bavaria in 919, but in 921 renounced the crown and submitted to Henry while maintaining significant autonomy and the right to mint his own coins.

In his time, the king was considered primus inter pares (first among equals). The king and princes formulated policies together and the position of the monarchy could only be consolidated gradually. Even under Otto the Great and later monarchs, consensus building would remain important.

=== Wars over Lotharingia ===
Map of Lotharingia in the 10th century

In 920, the king of West Francia, Charles the Simple, invaded and marched as far as Pfeddersheim near Worms, but retreated when he learned that Henry was organizing an army. On 7 November 921, Henry and Charles met and concluded the Treaty of Bonn, in which Henry was recognized as the East Frankish king and Charles' rule in Lotharingia was recognized. Henry then saw an opportunity to take Lotharingia when a civil war over royal succession began in West Francia after the coronation of King Robert I. In 923 Henry crossed the Rhine twice, capturing a large part of the duchy. The eastern part of Lotharingia was left in Henry's possession until October 924.

In 925 Duke Gilbert of Lotharingia rebelled. Henry invaded the duchy and besieged Gilbert at Zülpich (Tolbiac), captured the town, and became master of a large portion of his lands. Allowing Gilbert to remain in power as duke, Henry arranged the marriage of his daughter Gerberga to his new vassal in 928. Thus he brought that realm, which had been lost in 910, back into the kingdom as the fifth stem duchy.

=== Wars with Magyars ===
The threat of Magyar raiders improved his situation, as all the dukes and nobles realized that only a strong state could defend their lands against barbarian incursions.

In 919 Henry was defeated by the Magyars in the Battle of Püchen, hardly escaping from being killed in battle, managing to take refuge in the town of Püchen. (Note: Rex autem Avares sepenumero insurgentes expulit. Et cum in uno dierum hos inpari congressu ledere temptaret, victus in urbem, quae Bichni vocatur, fugit; ibique mortis periculum evadens, urbanos maiori gloria, quam hactenus haberent vel comprovinciales hodie teneant, et ad haec muneribus dignis honorat." English translation from the Latin: The king drove away the Avars [Magyars], who attacked his country repeatedly. And when he once, with insufficient forces, dared to attack them, he was defeated and fled in a city, with the name Bichni [Püchen]. Because he there escaped death, so he gave the citizens the same greater privileges than they had before, and which have no match among their countrymen until this day, and besides that, he gave them rich presents too.")

In 921 the Magyars once again invaded East Francia and Italy. Although a sizable Magyar force was defeated near Bleiburg in the Bavarian March of Carinthia by Eberhard and the Count of Meran and another group was routed by Liutfried, count of Elsass (French reading: Alsace), the Magyars continued raiding East Francia.

Henry, having captured a Hungarian prince, managed to arrange a ten-year truce in 924, though he agreed to pay annual tribute. By doing so he and the dukes gained time to build new fortified towns and to train a new elite cavalry force. Henry built fortified settlements as a defense against Magyar and Slav invaders. In 932 Henry refused to pay the annual tribute to the Magyars. When they began raiding again, Henry, with his improved army in 933 at the Battle of Riade, crushed the Magyars so completely that they never returned to the northern lands of Henry's kingdom.

=== Wars with Slavs ===
During the truce with the Magyars, Henry subdued the Polabian Slavs who lived on his eastern borders. In the winter of 928 he marched against the Slavic Hevelli tribes and seized their capital, Brandenburg. He then invaded the Glomacze lands on the middle Elbe river, conquering the capital Gana (Jahna) after a siege, and had a fortress (the later Albrechtsburg) built at Meissen. In 929, with the help of Arnulf of Bavaria, Henry entered the Duchy of Bohemia and forced Duke Wenceslaus I to resume the annual payment of tribute to the king.

Meanwhile, the Slavic Redarii had driven away their chief, captured the town of Walsleben and massacred its inhabitants. Counts Bernard and Thietmar marched against the fortress of Lenzen beyond the Elbe, and, after fierce fighting, completely routed the enemy on 4 September 929. The Lusatians and the Ukrani on the lower Oder were subdued and made tributary in 932 and 934, respectively. In conquered lands Henry did not create march administration, which was implemented by his successor Otto I.

=== Wars with Danes ===
Henry also pacified territories to the north, where the Danes had been harrying the Frisians by sea. The monk and chronicler Widukind of Corvey in his Res gestae Saxonicae reports that the Danes were subjects of Henry the Fowler. Henry incorporated into his kingdom territories held by the Wends, who together with the Danes had attacked Germany, and also conquered Schleswig in 934.

== Family and children ==
As the first Saxon king of East Francia, Henry was the founder of the Ottonian dynasty. He and his descendants ruled East Francia, and later the Holy Roman Empire, from 919 until 1024.

Henry had two wives and at least six children:

- With Hatheburg:
1. Thankmar (908–938) – rebelled against his half-brother Otto and was killed in battle in 938
- With Matilda:
1. Hedwig (910–965) – wife of West Francia's powerful Robertian duke Hugh the Great, mother of Hugh Capet, King of West Francia
2. Otto I (912–973) – Duke of Saxony, King of East Francia and Holy Roman Emperor. In 929 Henry married Otto to Eadgyth, daughter of Edward the Elder, King of Wessex
3. Gerberga (913–984) – wife of (1) Duke Gilbert of Lotharingia and (2) King Louis IV of France
4. Henry I (919–955) – Duke of Bavaria
5. Bruno (925–965) – Archbishop of Cologne and Duke of Lotharingia and regent of West Francia.

== Legacy ==
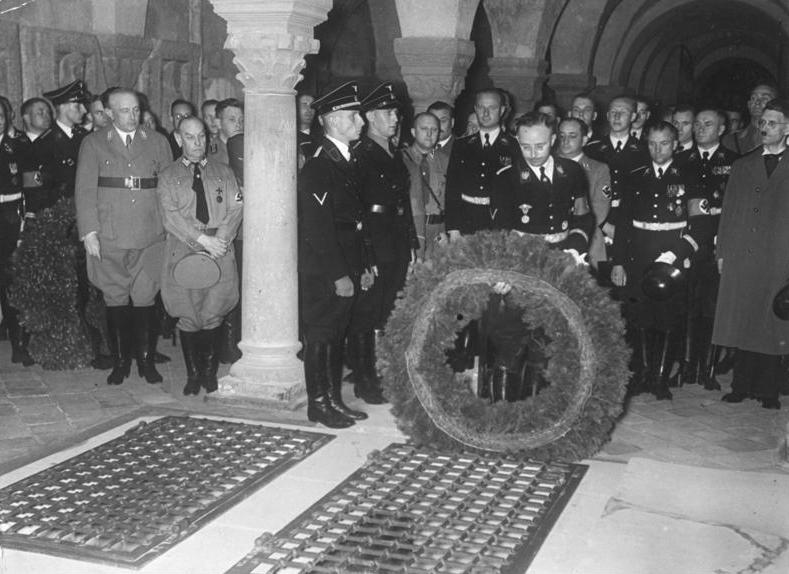
Himmler at Henry's grave, 1938

Henry returned to public attention as a character in Richard Wagner's opera, Lohengrin (1850), trying to gain the support of the Brabantian nobles against the Magyars. After the attempts to achieve German national unity failed with the Revolutions of 1848, Wagner strongly relied on the picture of Henry as the actual ruler of all German tribes as advocated by pan-Germanist activists like Friedrich Ludwig Jahn.

There are indications that Heinrich Himmler saw himself as the reincarnation of Henry, who was proclaimed to be the first king of Germany. Himmler traveled to Quedlinburg several times to hold a ceremony in the crypt on the anniversary of the king's death, 2 July. This started in 1936, 1,000 years after Henry died. Himmler considered him to be the "first German king" and declared his tomb a site of pilgrimage for Germans. In 1937, the king's remains were reinterred in a new sarcophagus.

== In the arts ==
- Henry the Fowler is a main character of Richard Wagner's opera Lohengrin.
- Henry the Fowler is one of two antagonists, being the end boss in the final mission of the 2001 game Return to Castle Wolfenstein. The game portrays him as an evil necromancer and anachronistically places him in 943 CE, 7 years after his actual death year of 936.

== See also ==
- Family tree of the German monarchs

== Sources ==
- Bachrach, David S. (2012). Warfare in Tenth-Century Germany. The Boydell Press.
- Bachrach. David S. "Restructuring the Eastern Frontier: Henry I of Germany, 924–936," Journal of Military History (Jan 2014) 78#1 pp 9–36
- Barraclough, Geoffrey, ed. (1961). Studies in Mediaeval History:Mediaeval Germany. Vol. II. Essays. Basil Blackwell.
- Bernhardt, John W. (2002). Itinerant Kingship & Royal Monasteries in Early Medieval German, c. 936–1075. Cambridge University Press.
- Frischauer, Willi (1953). Himmler, the Evil Genius of the Third Reich. Odhams.
- Kersten, Felix (1957). The Kersten Memoirs: 1940–1945. Macmillan.
- von Holtzmann, Robert (1935). Thietmari Merseburgensis Episcopi Chronicon. Weidmannsche Buchhandlung.
- Janssen, Karl-Heinz (2000). "Himmlers Heinrich(German)" (PDF). Die Zeit.
- Krofta, Kamil (1957). "Bohemia to the Extinction of the Premyslids". In Tanner, J.R.; Previt-Orton, C.W.; Brook, Z.N. (eds.). The Cambridge Medieval History: Victory of the Papacy. Vol. VI. Cambridge University Press.
- Leyser, Karl (1982). Medieval Germany and Its Neighbours 900–1250 (1st ed.). The Hambledon Press.
- Poole, Austen Lane (1926). "Germany: Henry I and Otto the Great". In Gwatkin, H. M.; Whitney, J. P.; Tanner, J.R.; Previte-Orton, C.W. (eds.). The Cambridge Medieval History. Vol. III. Cambridge University Press. pp. 179–203.
- Steinberg, S. H. (2014). A Short History of Germany. Cambridge University Press. ISBN 978-1-107-66016-8.

Henry the Fowler Ottonian dynasty Born: 876 Died: 2 July 936
Regnal titles
Preceded by Conrad the Younger	King of East Francia; 919–936	Succeeded by Otto the Great
Preceded by Otto the Illustrious	Duke of Saxony; 912–936	Succeeded by Otto the Great
