= Otto the Illustrious =

Saxon German nobleman (died 912)

- Duke of Saxony
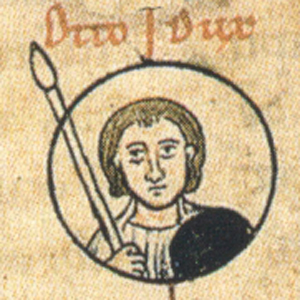
- Depiction of Otto I Dux, in the Chronica Sancti Pantaleonis, Cologne (c. 1237)
- Reign: 880 – 912
- Predecessor: Bruno, Duke of Saxony
- Successor: Henry the Fowler
- Born: c. 830/851; Saxony, Germany
- Died: 30 November 912; Wallhausen, Saxony
- Buried: Gandersheim Abbey
- Noble family: Ottonian dynasty
- Spouse: Hathui of Babenberg
- Issue: Thankmar; Liudolf; Henry the Fowler; Oda of Saxony
- Father: Liudolf, Duke of Saxony
- Mother: Oda of Gandersheim

Otto (c. 830/851 – 30 November 912), called the Illustrious (German: Otto der Erlauchte) by later authors, was a notable member of the Ottonian dynasty and Duke of Saxony from 880 until his death in 912. He played an important role in early medieval history of Germany during the 9th and 10th centuries, noted for his military campaigns and diplomatic efforts.

== Family ==
Otto was the younger son of the Saxon count Liudolf (d. 866), the progenitor of the dynasty, and his wife Oda of Gandersheim (d. 913), daughter of the Saxon princeps Billung. Among his siblings were his eldest brother Bruno, heir to their father's estates, and Liutgard, who in 876 became Queen of East Francia as consort of the Carolingian king Louis the Younger. The marriage expressed Liudolf's dominant position in the Saxon lands.

Around 873 Otto himself married Hathui (d. 903), probably daughter of the Frankish princeps militiae Henry of Franconia, a member of the noble house of the Popponids (Elder House of Babenberg). By her he had two sons, Thankmar and Liudolf, who predeceased him, but his third son Henry the Fowler succeeded him as duke of Saxony and was later elected king of East Francia. Otto's daughter Oda married the Carolingian King Zwentibold of Lotharingia, son of Emperor Arnulf.

His family came to be known as the Liudolfinger after his father Liudolf. Upon the accession of his grandson, Emperor Otto the Great, the dynasty came to be referred to as the Ottonian dynasty.

== Reign ==
On 26 January 877, King Louis the Younger issued a charter to Gandersheim Abbey. The charter described the region of South Thuringia, known as ‘pago Suththuringa,’ as ‘in comitatu Ottonis,’ which means 'in Otto's country.' He succeeded his brother Bruno as duke of Saxony after the latter's death in the Battle of Lüneburg Heath (Ebsdorf) on 2 February 880, while fighting against the Viking invaders.

Ruling over vast Saxon and Thuringian estates, Otto was mentioned as dux in later sources, while in a contemporary charter of 28 January 897, Otto is described as marchio and the pago Eichesfelden (Eichsfeld) is now found to be within his county (march). He was also the lay abbot of Hersfeld Abbey in 908 and fifty years later was described as magni ducis Oddonis (great duke Otto) by the chronicler Widukind of Corvey when describing the marriage of his sister Liutgard to King Louis.

Despite his dynastic relations, Otto only had loose connections to the Carolingian court and rarely left Saxony. He remained a regional East Frankish prince and his lieges, Louis the Younger and Emperor Arnulf, with both of whom he was on good terms, rarely interfered in Saxon autonomy. In his lands, Otto was prince in practice and he also established himself as a tributary ruler over the neighbouring Slavic tribes in the east, such as the Daleminzi.

According to Widukind of Corvey, the "Saxon and Franconian people" offered Otto the kingship of East Francia after the death of the last Carolingian monarch, Louis the Child, in 911. Otto did not accept the offer, possibly because he felt the burden of ruling was too heavy for him at his advanced age. Instead, suggesting Duke Conrad of Franconia. The truthfulness of this report is considered doubtful. (Note: Reuter calls it "panegyric rather than history.")

The next year, in 912, Otto died at the Pfalz of Wallhausen. He was buried in the church of Gandersheim Abbey.

== Sources ==
- Brown, Phyllis R.; Wailes, Stephen L., eds. (2013). A Companion to Hrotsvit of Gandersheim (fl. 960): Contextual and Interpretive Approaches. Brill.
- von Corvey, Widukind (2014). Deeds of the Saxons. Washington, D.C.: The Catholic University of America Press. p. 27. ISBN 9780813226934.
- Reuter, Timothy (1991). Germany in the Early Middle Ages 800–1056. Longman.
- Riche, Pierre (1993). The Carolingians: A Family who Forged Europe. Translated by Allen, Michael Idomir. University of Pennsylvania Press.
- Wilson, Katharina M. (1998). Hrotsvit of Gandersheim: A Florilegium of Her Works. D.S. Brewer.

Otto the Illustrious Ottonian dynasty Born: c. 830/51 Died: 30 November 912
Regnal titles
| Preceded by Bruno | Duke of Saxony; 880–912 | Succeeded by Henry I |
