= Hathumoda =

Saxon abbess (840–874)

Hathumoda (840 – November 874) was a Saxon noblewoman who became the first abbess of Gandersheim. Her family, the Liudolfings, founded the Gandersheim Abbey, and she was cloistered since childhood. After she died in an epidemic, there was an unsuccessful attempt to promote her as a saint.

== Origin and childhood ==
Hathumoda was born in 840. Her parents were Count Liudolf of Saxony and the Frankish noblewoman Oda. Hathumoda's family, the Liudolfings, were rich and powerful. Their ancestors had only recently been converted to Christianity, which may explain Hathumoda's name (spelt variously as Hathamod, Hathemod, Hadamot, or Hadamout in Germanic sources), meaning "battle courage", unusual for a Christian woman. Oda's mother, Aeda, may have been the abbess of the Herford Abbey, the oldest women's monastery in Saxony. Herford Abbey followed the Benedictine rule, and Hathumoda was sent to be educated there as a child.

Liudolf and Oda decided to found a new religious community for women on their allodial lands at Gandersheim, with Hathumoda as its abbess, and they travelled to Rome to gain Pope Sergius II's permission. Sergius consented and sent the couple back to Saxony with the relics of Popes Anastasius I and Innocent I.

== Abbacy ==
Hathumoda was installed as Gandersheim's first abbess in 852 when she reached the canonical age of 12. The construction of the present-day Gandersheim Abbey began in 856 but was not completed in Hathumoda's lifetime. Instead, Hathumoda and her community lived near her family's seat at Brunshausen in a temporary compound next to a Benedictine monastery. Hathumoda never left her convent and was eventually joined by as many as five of her sisters.

The monk and historian Rudolf of Fulda contacted Hathumoda sometime after 852, sending her a dedicated copy of his biography of Saint Leoba. Rudolf may have hoped to establish a special relationship between the Fulda Abbey and Hathumoda's community, but no further communication between the two is known, and Hathumoda appears to have preferred to foster relations with the abbeys of Herford and Corvey.

An epidemic struck northwestern Europe in 874, claiming the lives of nearly a third of the population of Gaul and Germany, according to Rudolf of Fulda. Hathumoda's community was not spared. She contracted the illness while caring for the sick. Her first biographer states that Hathumoda displayed prophecy and experienced visions of heaven during her prolonged struggle with the illness. She died in late November and was buried in the church at Brunshausen next to her father.

== Legacy ==
Hathumoda was succeeded as abbess by her sister, Gerberga, who had the remains of Hathumoda and their father transferred to the abbey church at Gandersheim in 881. After she died in 896, Gerberga was succeeded by another sister, Christina.

Nearly all information about Hathumoda comes from a biography written by Agius, a monk at Corvey, titled Vita Hathumodae and called by historian Julia M. H. Smith "the high point of Carolingian hagiography about women". Agius produced this biography shortly after Hathumoda died. Researchers do not agree on the nature of Hathumoda's relationship with Agius; he has variously been interpreted as Hathumoda's brother, her father's brother, a friend, or simply a fellow monastic. According to Agius, Hathumoda was pious, learned, and an exemplary abbess. He states that Hathumoda led the nuns of Gandersheim according to the Benedictine rule. He hoped that Hathumoda's community would embrace the Benedictine rule, but it remained a house of secular canonesses.

Despite Agius's hagiographical portrayal, Hathumoda was never venerated, not even by her family. Because he wrote for an audience that knew Hathumoda in life, Agius could not afford to gloss over the flaws that made Hathumoda an unlikely candidate for sainthood: his characterization of the abbess reveals anxiety and even occasional petulance. No miracles were attributed to Hathumoda—Agius's Hathumodae simply depicting her as a role model to emulate—and she attracted no cult. The poet Hrotsvit, a canoness at Gandersheim, downplayed Hathumoda in her work about the abbey and instead focused on Hathumoda's mother and grandmother.

Hathumoda's family established a royal dynasty in the 10th century when her nephew Henry the Fowler became king of Germany. Henry's wife, Matilda of Ringelheim, appears to have attempted to suppress the memory of Hathumoda, Oda, Gerberga, and Christina. By the 11th century, Hathumoda had been largely forgotten.

== Genealogy ==
Hathumoda's close family and relationship with the contemporary religious and political figures of Germany

Altfrid bishop of Hildesheim	Agius?	Liudolf count of Saxony	Oda
Hathumoda, abbess of Gandersheim	Bruno count of Saxony	Otto the Illustrious duke of Saxony	Liutgard queen of Germany	Louis the Younger king of Germany	Gerberga abbess of Gandersheim	Christina abbess of Gandersheim	4 children (died young)	1-3 daughters (canonesses at Gandersheim)
Henry the Fowler king of Germany	Matilda of Ringelheim queen of Germany
Ottonian dynasty kings and emperors
