= Altfrid =

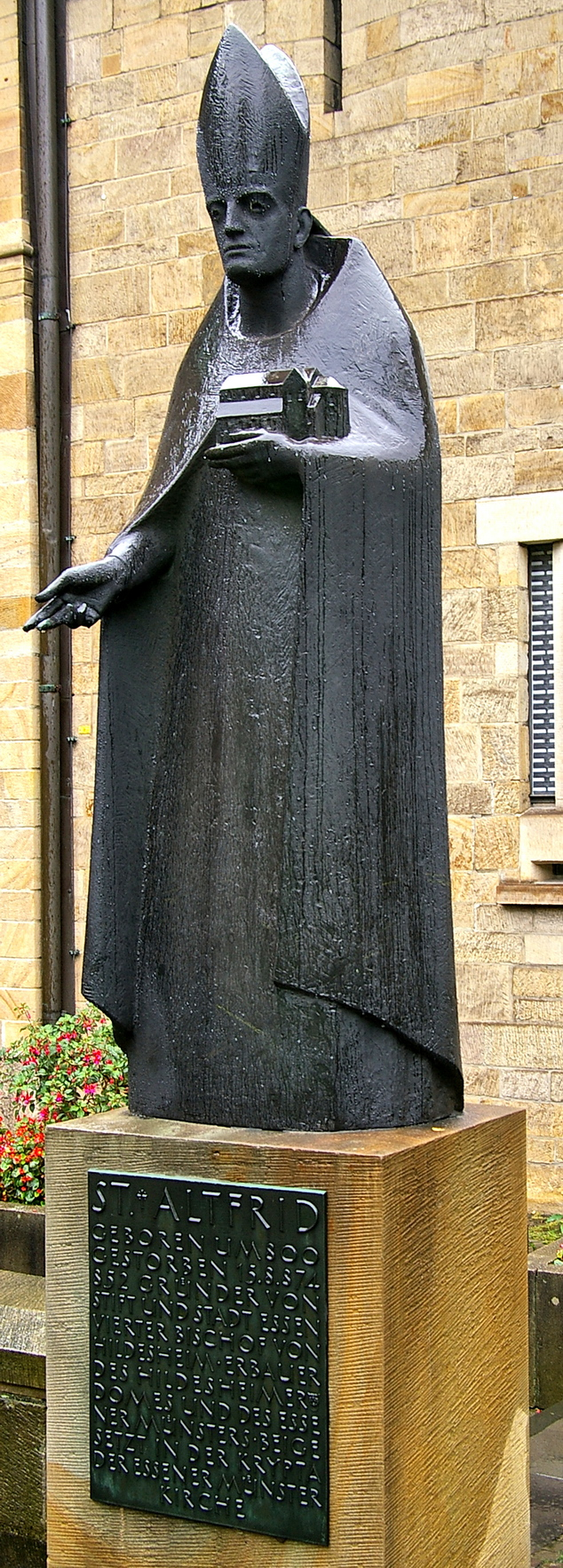
A modern statue of Saint Altfrid at Essen Cathedral

Saint Altfrid (or Altfrid of Hildesheim) (died 15 August 874) was a leading figure in Germany in the ninth century. A Benedictine monk, he became Bishop of Hildesheim, and founded Essen Abbey. He was also a close adviser to the East Frankish King Louis the German.

== Life ==
There is no contemporary biography of Altfrid. He is first mentioned on 3 October 852, when he took part in a council in Mainz as bishop of Hildesheim.

According to the Hildesheim Chronicle Altfrid died "rich in days" in 874, from which a year of birth of around 800 is assumed. He owned land in the Harzvorland and in central Essen (Asnithi), which may have been inherited from his family, and it seems likely that he belonged to the Saxon nobility, and may have been connected to the Liudolfings, who, however, had no influence in Altfrid's foundation Essen Abbey (Stift Essen) until after his death.

He was apparently a monk at Corvey Abbey before he was declared Bishop of Hildesheim in 851 in succession to Ebbo, who died on 20 March of that year. Since Ebbo had been installed and removed several times as Archbishop of Reims, Altfrid took the unusual step of repeating all consecrations and ordinations of his predecessor to avoid their invalidation.

In 864, Altfrid moved the relics of Saint Marsus from Auxerre to an unknown place in Saxony, most likely to Corvey Abbey. His sermon on the arrival of the relics survives. In addition, Altfrid laid the cornerstone of a new cathedral in Hildesheim in 852, a three-aisled cruciform church with a crossing and transept. It was completed in 872 and was consecrated on 1 November 872 in the presence of four bishops and the Abbot of Corvey.

Even before his consecration as bishop, Altfrid had been active in the foundation of several female religious communities. Between 845 and 847 he acquired the relics of Saints Cosmas and Damian in Rome. (Note: He may have been accompanying Liudolf and his wife Oda, who in 846 during a visit to Rome asked for papal protection for the foundation of Gandersheim Abbey, a house of secular canonesses, for the appointment of her daughter Hathumod to be abbess, and for relics.) Altfrid also supported the Saxon Count Ricdag in the foundation of the nunnery at Lamspringe by procuring for it the relics of Saint Hadrian from Rome.

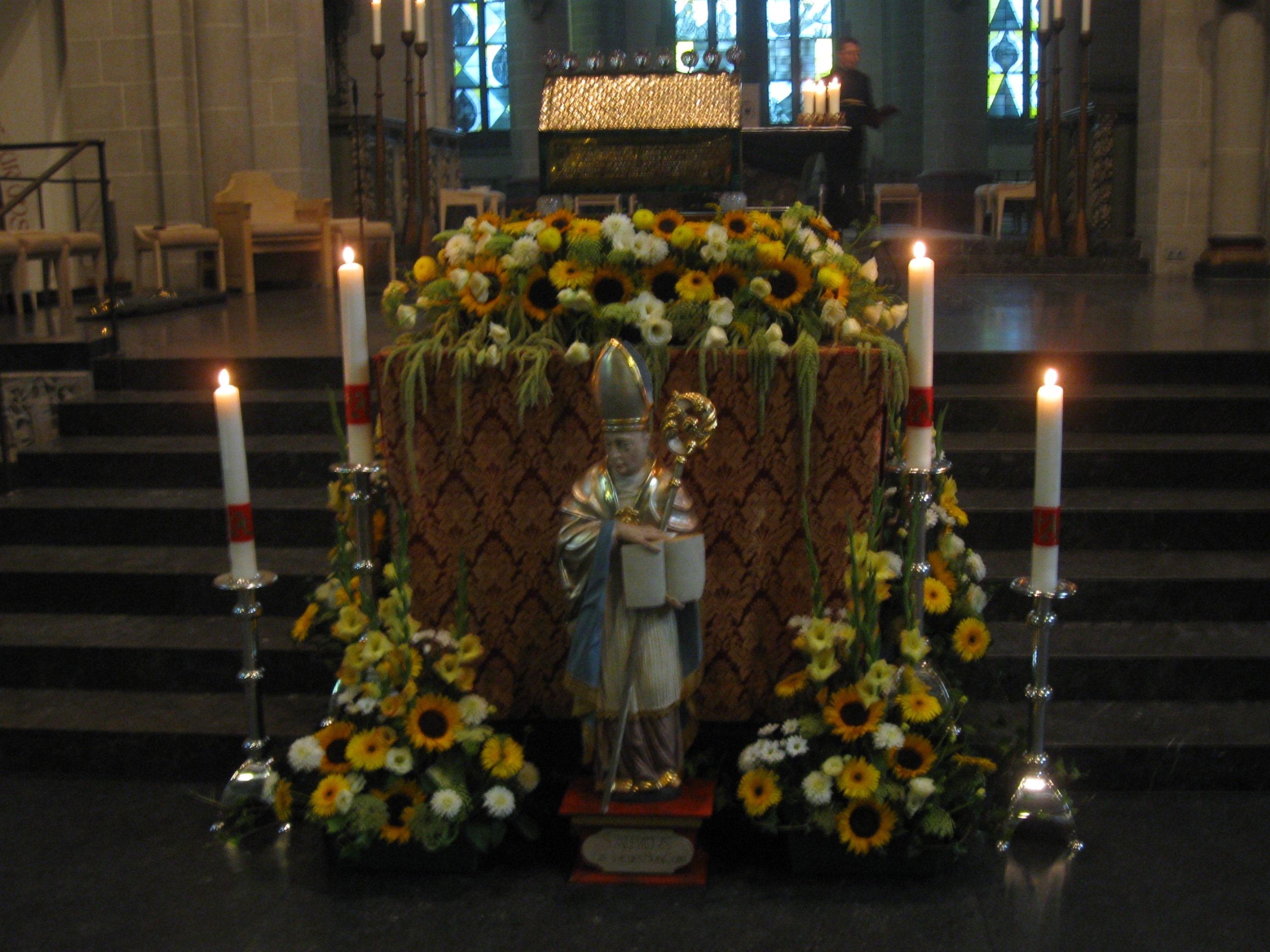
Saint Altfrid's relics on display in Essen Cathedral on his feast day

According to the Hildesheim Chronicle Altfrid also founded a Benedictine monastery on his own land in the Harzvorland, of which no further details of either location or duration are known. More important is Altfrid's other foundation, Essen Abbey (Stift Essen), on his property in Essen (Asthnide) on the Hellweg. The first Abbess of Essen was his kinswoman Gerswith, often referred to as his sister, although there is no direct evidence of this. (Note: Coincidentally the second abbess of Essen was also named Gerswith but seems not to have been a relative of Altfrid.) Altfrid built a chapel in Essen, dedicated to Saint Quentin; (this was demolished in 1817). He also built a church for the canonesses, the Stiftskirche, later known as the Essener Münster and from 1958 as Essen Cathedral. Altfrid was buried here after his death on 15 August 874, according to his wishes. A Gothic tomb stands over his grave in the east crypt, which is named after him.

Altfrid founded Liesborn Abbey and a monastery for men at Osterwieck near Seligenstadt.

== Diplomat ==
Altfrid was a close confidant of Ludwig the German and from 860 took an influential role in the power struggles between the various parts of the disintegrating Frankish empire. In 860 Altfrid was present at the meeting between Ludwig the German and Charles the Bald in St. Castor's Basilica in Koblenz, where the two kings agreed a peace treaty. In the years that followed it is possible to trace a great deal of traveling on Altfrid's part: in 862 he was in Asselt, later in Compiègne and Savonnières, in 864 in Pitres, in 865 at the Synod of Thousey, in 867 in Metz and in 868 at the Synod of Worms. Altfrid had decisive influence on the form of the Treaty of Meerssen, which divided Lotharingia on 9 August 870 between West Francia and East Francia.

== Death and after ==
The place of Altfrid's death is not known, although the date is recorded by Abbot Altbert of Lobbes as the feast of the Assumption of the Virgin Mary, i.e., 15 August 874. He was buried, according to his wishes, in the church of Essen Abbey.

After his death Altfrid was particularly venerated at his tomb in Essen. Around the year 1000 miracles were reported at his grave, which greatly increased the veneration, and the effects of a supposedly healing spring close to the church were also ascribed to his intercession. After a serious fire in the church in the 13th century a Gothic stone sarcophagus was used for his remains.

Altfrid was not a canonised saint, so when the abbey was secularised in 1803 his veneration fell off, only to revive during the Kulturkampf at the end of the century. After the foundation of the Bishopric of Essen in 1958 the first bishop asked Rome to confirm the celebration of Altfrid's feast day as an official church festival, a request which was granted in 1965.

== Sources ==
- Pothmann, Alfred, 2002: Bischof Altfrid (um 800–874). Der Hildesheimer Bischof und die Essener Frauengemeinschaft, in: Alfred Pothmann and Reimund Haas (eds.): Christen an der Ruhr, vol. 2. Bottrop Essen: Verlag Peter Pomp. ISBN 3-89355-231-6
- Schilp, Thomas, 2000: Altfrid oder Gerswid? Zur Gründung und den Anfängen des Frauenstifts Essen, in: Herrschaft, Bildung und Gebet. Essen: Klartext Verlag. ISBN 3-88474-907-2

Altfried Born: ~800 Died: 15 August 874
Christian titles
| Preceded by Ebbo | Bishop of Hildesheim; 847–874 | Succeeded by Ludolf |
