= Oda of Gandersheim =

Saxon noblewoman

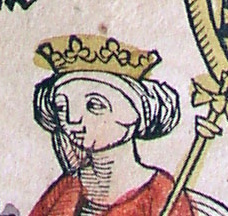
Oda as depicted in the 15th-century Nuremberg Chronicle

Oda of Gandersheim (died 912/919) was a Saxon noblewoman who founded Gandersheim Abbey. She was an ancestor of the Ottonian dynasty.

Oda's mother's name was Aeda and her father's probably Billung. She was married to Liudolf of Saxony, with whom she had 12–14 children, including three sons and a daughter who died young. Her children who survived to adulthood include:

- Brun, duke of Saxony
- Otto, duke of Saxony, father of King Henry the Fowler
- Hathumoda, first abbess of Gandersheim
- Gerberga, second abbess of Gandersheim
- Christina, third abbess of Gandersheim
- Liutgard, queen of King Louis the Younger
- Enda, married
- 1–3 daughters who became nuns at Gandersheim

Oda and Liudolf "committed themselves to establishing a convent soon after their marriage." For this purpose, they travelled to Rome to acquire relics of the saints in 845–846. From Pope Sergius II they received not just relics of his predecessors, Innocent I and Anastasius I, but also papal protection for their foundation. A community of nuns was established at Brunshausen in 852 with their daughter Hathumoda as its designated abbess. Construction of a permanent home was begun at Gandersheim, but it was not consecrated until All Saints' Day 881, after Hathumoda's death in 874.

Liudolf died in 866. Oda spent much of her widowhood at Gandersheim. Another daughter, Gerberga, succeeded Hathumoda and was succeeded by a third, Christina. It has been speculated that Oda died at Gandersheim in either 912 or 919. According to Hrotsvitha's Primordia coenobii Gandeshemensis, she was 107 years old when she died.

== Bibliography ==
- Gilsdorf, Sean (2004). Queenship and Sanctity: The Lives of Mathilda and the Epitaph of Adelheid. Catholic University of America Press.
- Greer, Sarah (2021). Commemorating Power in Early Medieval Saxony: Writing and Rewriting the Past at Gandersheim and Quedlinburg. Oxford University Press.
- Paxton, Frederick S. (2009). Anchoress and Abbess in Ninth-Century Saxony: The Lives of Liutbirga of Wendhausen and Hathumoda of Gandersheim. Catholic University of America Press.
