= Liudolf of Saxony =

Duke of Saxony

Liudolf
- Count of Saxony
- Liudolf from a 12th-century manuscript of the chronicle of Ekkehard of Aura
- Reign: 844–866
- Born: c. 805/820
- Died: 11/12 March 866
- Buried: Gandersheim Abbey
- Noble family: Ottonian dynasty (Liudolfings)
- Spouse: Oda of Gandersheim
- Issue: Bruno, Duke of Saxony; Otto I, Duke of Saxony; Liutgard of Saxony
- Father: Bruno
- Mother: Gisela

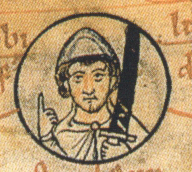
Ludolf dux Saxonie at the top of a pedigree of the Ottonian dynasty, Chronica sancti Pantaleonis, Cologne, 12th century

Liudolf (c. 805/820 – 11/12 March 866) was a Carolingian office bearer and count in the Duchy of Saxony from about 844 until his death in 866. The ruling Liudolfing house, also known as the Ottonian dynasty, is named after him; he is its oldest verified member.

== Life ==
Liudolf was the son of a margrave (German: Markgraf) Bruno and his wife, Gisla. or Oda de Billung. Liudolf had extended possessions in the western Harz foothills and on the Leine river, he also served as a military leader (dux) in the wars of the East Frankish king Louis the German against Viking invasions, and the Polabian Slavs. Later authors called Liudolf a duke of the Eastern Saxons (dux Orientalis Saxonum, probably since 850) and count of Eastphalia.

About 830 Liudolf married Oda, daughter of a Frankish princeps named Billung and his wife Aeda. By marrying a Frankish nobleman's daughter, Liudolf followed suggestions set forth by Charlemagne about ensuring the integrity of the Carolingian Empire in the aftermath of the Saxon Wars through marriage. Oda died on 17 May 913, supposedly at the age of 107. They had at least seven children:

- Bruno (c. 830/840 – 880), succeeded his father as a Saxon leader, supposed progenitor of the Brunonids
- Oda of Saxony (c. 845 – 874), married to Lothar I, Count of Stade
- Otto the Illustrious (c. 851 – 912), succeeded his brother in 880, father of King Henry the Fowler
- Liutgard (c. 840 – 885), married the East Frankish ruler Louis the Younger in 874
- Hathumoda (c. 840 – 874), first Abbess of Brunshausen from 852
- Gerberga (d. 896/897), Abbess of Brunshausen from 874 and later of Gandersheim
- Christina (d. 919/920), Abbess of Gandersheim from 896/97

In 845/846, Liudolf and his wife went on a pilgrimage to Rome, and upon approval by Pope Sergius II they founded a house of holy canonesses dedicated to Popes Anastasius I and Innocent I around 852. The monastery, duly established at their proprietary church in Brunshausen, was consecrated by the Hildesheim bishop Altfrid and Liudolf's minor daughter Hathumoda became its first abbess. The convent was relocated in 881 to form Gandersheim Abbey, elevated to an Imperial monastery by Liudolf's grandson Henry the Fowler in 919.

While King Louis the German was preoccupied with Imperial politics, Liudolf, relying on the rank as well as the allodial lands he had inherited from his ancestors, rose to a leading position among the Saxon nobles – made evident by the marriage of his daughter Liutgard with King Louis the Younger. He is buried in his proprietary monastery of Brunshausen. His successions by his sons Bruno and Otto met with no resistance.

== Sources ==
- Althoff, Gerd; Carroll, Christopher (2004). Family, Friends and Followers: Political and Social Bonds in Medieval Europe. Cambridge University Press.
- Keene, Catherine (2013). Saint Margaret, Queen of the Scots: A Life in Perspective. Palgrave Macmillan.
- Odilo of Cluny (2004). Queenship and sanctity: The lives of Mathilda and The epitaph of Adelheid. Translated by Gilsdorf, Sean. Catholic University of America Press.
- Riché, Pierre (1993). The Carolingians: A Family who Forged Europe. Translated by Allen, Michael Idomir. University of Pennsylvania Press.
- Schutz, Herbert (2010). The Medieval Empire in Central Europe: Dynastic Continuity in the Post-Carolingian Frankish Realm. Cambridge Scholars Publishing.
- Stephenson, Carl (1935). Mediæval History: Europe from the Fourth to the Sixteenth Century. Harper & brothers.
- Widukind of Corvey (2014). Deeds of the Saxons. Translated by Bachrach, Bernard S.; Bachrach, David S. Catholic University of America Press.

Liudolf of Saxony Ottonian dynasty Born: c. 805/20 Died: 11/12 March 866
Regnal titles
Preceded by ?	Count of Saxony; 844–866	Succeeded by Bruno
