= Elisabeth of Sachsen-Meiningen =

German aristocrat (1681–1766)

Elisabeth von Sachsen Meiningen
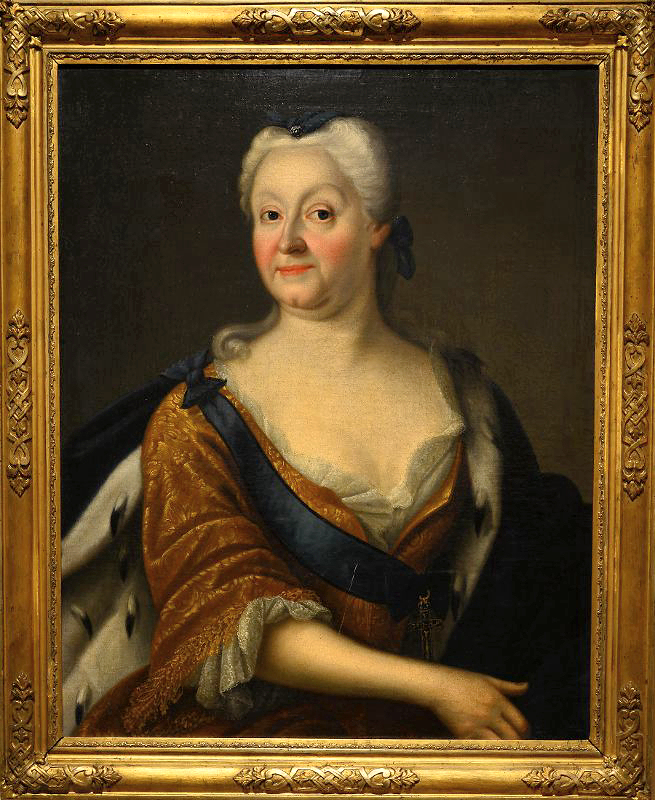
- Johann Heinrich Teilert, 1743
- Born: 3 December 1681; Meiningen, Herzogtum Sachsen-Meiningen
- Died: 24 December 1766 (aged 85); Stift Gandersheim, Herzogtum Sachsen-Meiningen
- Occupation: Abbess
- Known for: her patronage of the arts and literature
- Parents: Bernhard I von Saxe-Meiningen (father); Elisabeth Eleonore von Braunschweig-Wolfenbüttel (mother)

Elisabeth of Sachsen-Meiningen (3 December 1681 - 24 December 1766) was a princess of Sachsen-Meiningen. Between 1713. Until her death in 1766, she had been the long-serving Abbess of the free imperial secular [quasi-monastic] foundation at Gandersheim ("Kaiserlich freies weltliches Reichsstift Gandersheim").

== Life ==
Elisabeth Ernestine Antonie von Sachsen-Meiningen was born in December 1681 at Meiningen, a daughter of Bernhard I von Saxe-Meiningen and his second wife, Elisabeth Eleonore von Braunschweig-Wolfenbüttel, whom Duke Bernhard had married earlier that same year. Elisabeth Eleonore von Braunschweig-Wolfenbüttel's father - thereby Elisabeth of Sachsen-Meiningen's maternal grandfather - was the dynastically ambitious art-loving and prolifically letter-writing Prince Anthony Ulrich von Braunschweig-Wolfenbüttel.

She spent her childhood and teenage years at court, developing interests in literature and music at an early age. She was a gifted singer, and also made stage appearances at the court theatre. In 1713 she took over from her deceased kinswoman, Marie Elisabeth zu Mecklenburg, as Abbess at Gandersheim Abbey. Sources commend her piety. For forty years, between 1709 and 1749, she transcribed her own record of every sermon that she heard. Through her commitment to learning and the arts she was able greatly to expand both the monastic art collection and its library of books and manuscripts. For these reasons, and on account of the duration of her incumbency, she is widely viewed as the most important of the post-reformation abbesses at Gandersheim.

The current abbey library is largely her creation, in part through a major purchase made by her and the abbey chapter on 26 April 1721. This had become urgent because the abbey's former ancient treasures had mostly been lost during the course of The Reformation, or subsequently plundered during the seventeenth century's wars. Books during this period were still luxury items. Valuable support came from donors and from her chief steward, Anton Kroll von Freyhan, who administered the major book purchases that were central to the project. It is clear from the dedications included with the volumes that Elisabeth never hesitated to invite the abbey's visitors to make their own generous contributions to the book acquisition programme. The resulting collection contains relatively few works contemporary to the eighteenth century. Preferred acquisition strategies seem to have involved attendance - presumably by von Freyhan - at book auctions, or the acceptance of books bequeathed at the deaths of their former owners.

In 1695 a previous abbess, Henriette Christine, had successfully negotiated (with her father (Note: The father of Abbess Henriette Christine was Duke Anthony Ulrich of Brunswick-Wolfenbüttel. Duke Anthony Ulrich was also, as it happened, an uncle of the Abbess Elisabeth of Sachsen-Meiningen. Duke Anthony Ulrich had inherited the former monastery at Brunshausen from his own father had "acquired" this and other properties in the area in the context of the reformation.)) the return to the control of Gandersheim of the former monastery at Brunshausen, set in the countryside a fifteen-minute walk to the north of the town. In 1695 there were still four people living there, but by 1713 the site was unoccupied. Between 1713 and 1726 Abbess Elisabeth had the badly degraded former monastery rebuilt as a small "summer palace" set in its own "Baroque Garden", and equipped with its own "study and collection rooms". In 1726 work started on a magnificent new "Baroque wing" at Brunshausen, containing an impressive "imperial hall". This prestige project was completed in 1736, constituting an impressive memorial to the imperial devotion and the lavish "princessly court" created by the well-connected Abbess Elisabeth for her abbey. The former abbey fell into disrepair and was secularised during the first part of the nineteenth century, but the wing containing the "imperial hall" nevertheless survives, and in the early twenty-first century is an important stopping point for coach tours to Gandersheim.

As a child Abbess Elisabeth had received music lessons from the court musician Johann Ernst Ausfeld: Ausfeld had also taught music to her younger brother Anton Ulrich who in 1746 himself succeeded to headship of the Duchy of Saxe-Meiningen. The two shared a life-long love of music, and had other interests in common. They frequently worked closely together in matters of family and administration. When Anton Ulrich found himself in dispute with his younger half-brothers, he could always rely on the robust backing of his elder sister, the Abbess Elisabeth. When he was young she was also able to help him financially. They worked closely together on building up the art collection at the abbey, and after the death of the Abbess Elisabeth those elements in the art collection which had been in her ownership were bequeathed to the younger Duke Anton Ulrich, and thereby found their way to the court at Meiningen.

Abbess Elisabeth died on Christmas Eve 1766 at Gandersheim Abbey, after more than half a century in charge. An appropriately ebullient marble tomb in the abbey church celebrates her memory and accommodates her mortal remains.
