= Henriette Christine of Brunswick-Wolfenbüttel =

Henriette Christine
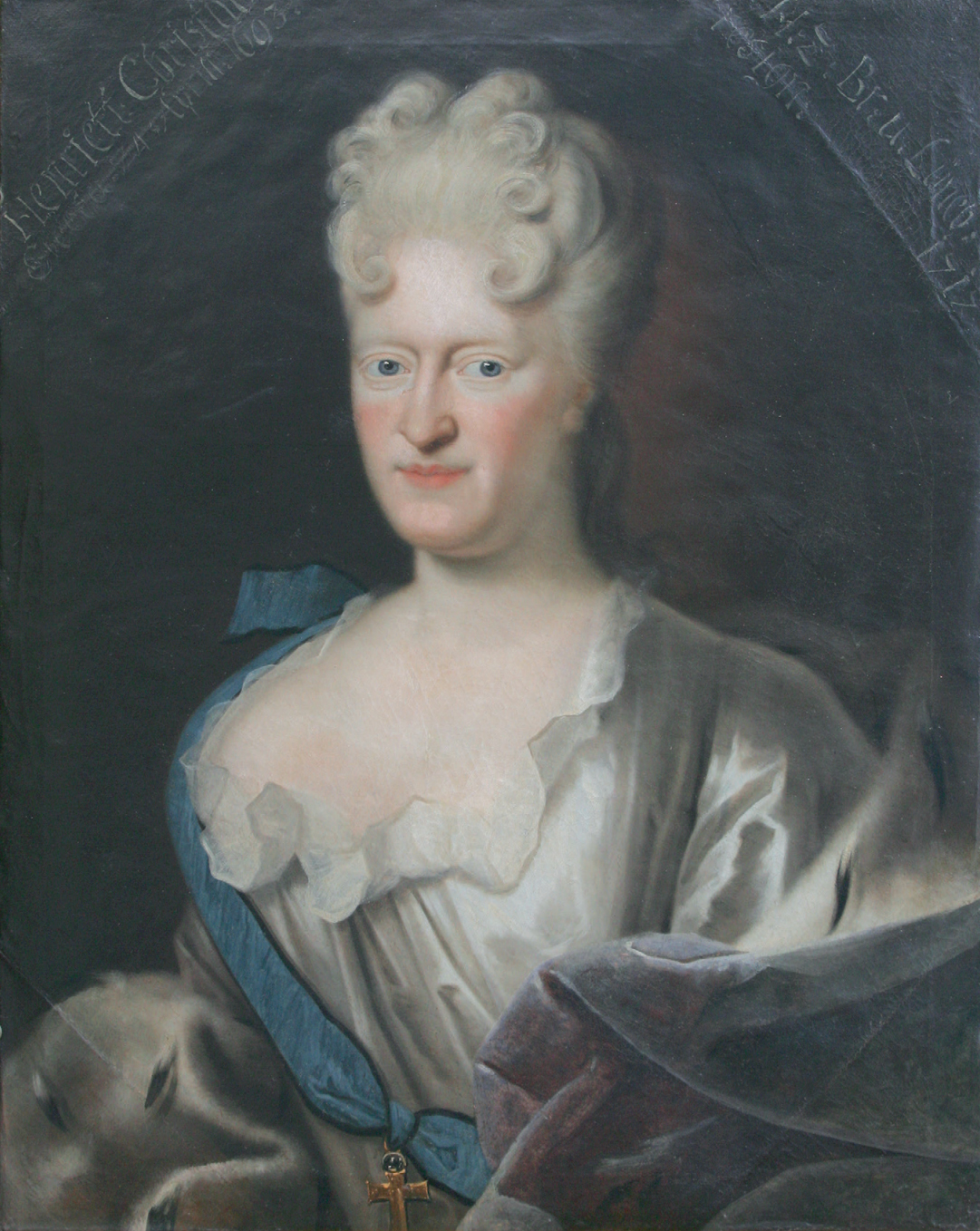
- Anonymous portrait of Henriette as Abbess

Princess-Abbess of Gandersheim
- Tenure: 21 December 1693 – 27 July 1712
- Predecessor: Christina of Mecklenburg
- Successor: Marie Elisabeth of Mecklenburg
- Born: 19 September 1669
- Died: 23 January 1753 (aged 83)
- Issue: Son (illegitimate)
- House: Welf
- Father: Anthony Ulrich, Duke of Brunswick-Wolfenbüttel
- Mother: Princess Elisabeth Juliane of Schleswig-Holstein-Sonderburg-Norburg
- Religion: Roman Catholicism prev. Lutheranism

Henriette Christine of Braunschweig-Wolfenbüttel (19 September 1669 - 20 January 1753) was a German princess. Among the younger of her parents' many children, she was installed as Abbess of Gandersheim following the death in 1693 of abbess Christina of Mecklenburg, her cousin. She and her successor as abbess, Elisabeth Ernestine Antonie, were well connected and great patrons of the arts: in the judgement of certain historians they presided over something of a golden age at Gandersheim. In 1712 Abbess Henrietta Christine made her place in the history books secure by giving birth. This put an end to her tenure.

== Life ==
=== Provenance and early years ===
Henriette Christine was a daughter of Duke Anthony Ulrich of Brunswick-Wolfenbüttel and his wife, Juliane of Holstein-Norburg. Her father, whom Henriette Christine was said to resemble closely both in looks and in character, was a scholarly duke and a man of wide interests. On 9 November 1681 she became a probationary canon at the abbey. This would have been principally designed to provide her with a small independent income ("benefice"), though even by the standards of the time it would have been a little unusual to confer such an office on an eleven year old. On 2 November 1687, having achieved the necessary age, she was installed in her office with due solemnity in her father's presence, though at this stage she continued to live at the princely court with her family. (Her father had become co-ruler of the Principality of Brunswick-Wolfenbüttel in 1685.) Just under six months after the death of her cousin, the Abbess Christina on 30 June 1693, however, the chapter unanimously elected Henriette Christine to take over as her successor, on 21 December 1693. Her parents were again present at the abbey on 24 April 1694 when she was enthroned with all due solemnity. The emperor's endorsement of her election came through on 27 September 1694.

Preparation for the election called for careful diplomacy in order to settle some longstanding differences between the imperial abbey and the emperor's family. The duke called upon the services of his chief steward, Hermann von Diepenbroick, to have the matter resolved. The principal conditions for the emperor's endorsement of the election included the return of the minor monasteries at Clus and Brunshausen which Duke Julius, an acquisitive previous Duke of Brunswick-Wolfenbüttel, had caused to be removed from the control of Gandersheim Abbey back in the sixteenth century. That condition was performed, as agreed, during December 1695. At the same time, as also agreed, a compensation payment was handed over in respect of a lost legal case concerning a hunting dispute at nearby Ellierode.

=== Abbess ===
Following her installation as abbess, she lived in the monastery, apart from irregular family visits to her father's court. She presided in person at chapter meetings. One of the first administrative changes under her leadership was a new regulation introduced by the Gandersheim chapter on 22 June 1696 concerning the admission to the community of new canonesses: in order to raise the profile of the monastery and to increase its income, it was determined that in future new canonesses should be required to demonstrate "imperial provenance" (reichsgräfliche Abkunft) to at least 4 degrees, and to introduce "Statutengelder" (loosely, "admission fees") of 16,000 Thalers.

The traditionally scratchy relationship between the local court and the privileged Imperial immediacy of the monastery was transformed under Abbess Henriette Christine. Her father had governed the principality as sole ruler since the death of his elder brother in 1704. In practice Rudolf Augustus had generally been content for his ambitious younger brother, who was seen as "politically astute" to take a lead on matters of governance ever since 1685. Duke Anthony Ulrich's own perspective was turned upside down between 1704 and 1708 by the engagement (in 1704) marriage (in 1708) of his famously beautiful teenage granddaughter, Elisabeth Christine, to the young prince who in 1711 would become the Emperor Charles VI. The young people had been engaged since 1704, and the resulting dynastic alliance put an end, for Brunswick-Wolfenbüttel, to the political tensions which under most circumstances were inherent in the power relationships between Hapsburg Holy Roman Emperors and the leading princes of the empire. Under Abbess Henriette Christine that same dynastic alliance drove a new emphasis on Gandersheim's imperial immediacy. One aspect of this was the regular attendance of Abbess Henriette Christine at sessions of the Imperial Diet ("... Reichstag" / "... parliament") at Regensburg. It was the same stress on imperial connections that necessitated a comprehensive reworking of Gandersheim's history. (Major monasteries were still important repositories of generally accepted historical truth at this time.) Abbess Henriette Christine entrusted the important task of reworking the monastery's history to her secretary-archivist, Johann Georg Leuckfeld.

Johann Georg Leuckfeld had arrived at the abbey as an historian-archivist a few years before the appointment of Abbess Henriette Christine in around 1700. His work on the abbey's historical records was approved by the Monastery Chapter on 23 June 1706. It enhanced his subsequent reputation as an historian-archivist. From the perspective of later historiography it is hard to avoid the conclusion that Leuckfeld also shares in the responsibility for the incomplete condition of the surviving archives at Gandersheim Abbey. He continued to work with the monastery archives. Most of his own surviving historical publications date from the first two decades of the eighteenth century. In 1710 Leuckfeld received a new job title which presumably reflected both a promotion and his increasingly central role alongside the abbess in monastery administration: he became a "Klosterrat" (loosely, "Monastery Administrator / Advisor"). Meanwhile, on 5 March 1709 a contract was agreed between the Abbess Henriette Christine and her father, the Duke, formalising the revocation of Gandersheim's interest in the minor monasteries (but evidently important archival repositories) at Clus and Brunshausen. The 1709 agreement also formalised the legal relationship between the monastery and the emperor, spelling out the Duke's status of as "Mitkonservator" (loosely, "co-curator"), subject to the emperor's appointment, of the monastery. A detail that was spelled out in the agreement was that when signing documents relating to the monastery, the Duke would desist from incorporating the designation "Unser Stift" (loosely, "our monastery"), as he had hitherto been accustomed to do.

One of many respects in which Abbess Henriette Christine resembled her father was in her love of show and ostentation. Under her leadership the monastery underwent a period of improvements and beautifications. Between 1696 and 1707 she oversaw the renovation of the choir area comprising the east end of the abbey church, being that part of the building which was the focus of the sisters' daily routine, and which had fallen into a state of disrepair during and since the upheavals of the reformation. In 1697 it was at the suggestion of the abbess that the most valuable medieval piece from the monastic treasury was sold to a Jewish merchant identified in the accounting records as Lazarus Levin, in order to be melted down by the specialist jewellers and metallurgists of Osterode. Naturally the records also disclose the orecise price received: this was 1,193 Thalers, 37 Groschens and 7 Pfennigs. In 1705 she provided her input on a further sale of lavishly bejewelled liturgical vestments and paraments.

As a young woman Abbess Henriette Christine was strongly influenced by the Lutheran pietist August Hermann Francke. The ducal family into which she had been born had been at least nominally a Protestant one for more than a hundred years, although there is no reason to believe that the abbess's father, Duke Anthony Ulrich, who liked to see himself as an enlightened undogmatic ruler, was particularly religious. During the early 1700s, little by little, father and daughter both found themselves drawn towards Catholicism. For Abbess Henriette Christine there are suggestions that she began to slide back towards the old faith after 24 March 1698, when the monastic chapter asked her to place her signature on a document consisting of a Christian Creed. As is often the case in matters involving Duke Anthony Ulrich, it is impossible to overlook the possibility of a political dimension. Arranging for the engagement of his thirteen-year-old granddaughter to the young man who would one day become emperor was a very considerable political-dynastic achievement on the part of Duke Anthony Ulrich. It was initially resisted by Elisabeth Christine herself, however, because she had grown up in the Protestant faith and she understood, correctly, that marriage to a Habsburg would involve becoming a Catholic. Between the engagement in 1704 and the marriage in 1708 it was necessary to expend considerable effort on persuading the child of the merits of Catholicism, or at least that conversion was a price worth paying. During 1705 and 1706 theologian Johann Fabricius made a series of visits from the Braunschweig consistory to the court at Gandersheim to persuade the princess to convert. Elisabeth Christine's future mother-in-law, the Empress Eleonore joined in with her own "tutoring". Abbess Henriette Christine, one of the stubborn child's aunts, was also engaged in this campaign of persuasion. In 1707 having duly been persuaded of the benefits, Elisabeth Christine of Brunswick-Wolfenbüttel converted to Roman Catholicism, and on 1 May 1707 was welcomed back into the true church in a great ceremony, at Bamberg Cathedral, which was conducted by the Archbishop-elector of Mainz.

=== Mother ===
The career of the abbess was unexpectedly cut short in 1712. On 8 July 1712, aged 42, Henriette Christine gave birth to her son. In the immediate aftermath of the event, the word was put about that "an unknown stranger had violated the abbess", but by September it was generally accepted that the conception had resulted from an entirely consensual affair. The child was the son of a minor German aristocrat called Georg Christoph von Braun (1663–1720), formerly a senior official at her father's court. Von Braun had accepted a senior administrative post (als "Stiftshauptmann") at the monastery on 29 September 1710. Promotion followed on 12 March 1712 with his appointment as "Abbey Steward" ("Abteihofmeister"). Following the birth of his son with the abbess, however, he was required to leave the principality: he went into exile in Saxony.

Duke Anthony Ulrich, having choreographed his granddaughters conversion to Catholicism in 1707, made the same switch on his own account in 1709. The Habsburgs were Roman Catholics. During or before 1712 Abbess Henriette Christine made the same switch. The monastery was generally thought to have become a Protestant foundation in 1568 at the instigation of Duke Julius of Braunschweig, one of Duke Anthony Ulrich's predecessors. However, by 1712 the denominational status of the monastery itself was not entirely clear, given the renewed emphasis placed on the foundation's status as an imperial immediacy, subject to the (Catholic) Hapsburg emperors. According to one source Duke Anthony Ulrich found out what he needed to know about his youngest daughter's "carnal intermingling" through a testimony received from his own father confessor. The testimony as recorded was curiously elliptical, presumably reflecting a determination on the part of Father Amadeus Hamilton not to breach the requirements of confessional confidentiality. It seemed that Abbess Henriette Christine had at no point confessed to having knowingly allowed fleshly intercourse, but from questions and details included in her own confession, Father Hamilton nevertheless inferred a lesser degree of innocence than had initially been assumed.

Duke Anthony Ulrich insisted on Henriette Christine's resignation as abbess. The written record of her resignation is dated 27 July 1712, which is one day later that the date appearing in the written record of her switch from Protestantism to Catholicism, giving rise to the inference that the two were directly connected. Sources are in most respects silent over what happened to the abbess's baby son. Arrangements were made for Henriette Christine to enter the large Cistercian Catholic Monastery at Roermond, apparently as a secular lay-sister. The duke was too unwell on 6 September 1712 when his youngest daughter left Gandersheim, to accompany her; so he took his leave of her in an affectionate letter from which it is clear that, regardless of his having insisted on her resignation, the version of Henriette Christine's misfortune which he wished to share in public, and with posterity, held that she was the innocent and still much hurt victim of a monstrous abuse. In another letter that the duke wrote later that month he referred to an anonymous letter that he had received in the post on the day that his daughter had left Gandersheim, in which the writer described the circumstances of the originating misfortune in terms indicating that reference had been made to the same source(s) as those used for Father Hamilton's own testimony. The duke wrote of his confidence that God would reveal the perpetrator of this "very strange" anonymous letter, and when that happened the evil perpetrator must be made to make an open exposure of the abbess's complete innocence. It is not clear that the anonymous letter writer was ever identified, however. Nor does it appear that the duke's determined efforts to have the scandalous aspects of the matter covered up had any lasting effect.

Six months before he died, in August 1713, Duke Anthony Ulrich undertook the long cross-country journey to Roermond in order to visit his daughter, to whom he was still devoted. He wrote in a letter that he found his daughter "very contented and calm" (Note: "... in ganz vergnügten ruhigen Zustand".) She completely rejected his suggestion that she should accompany him back to Gandersheim, and was unreceptive to his suggestion that it might be possible to find her a position as a religious sister at an imperial monastic foundation in Vienna. He expressed his concern that she might end up staying in Roermond in perpetuity. But that seems to have been the destiny to which she had already committed herself. She evidently felt the need to undertake a programme of penance. She was unquestioningly obedient to the rules and requirements of the religious community in which she found herself; and occupied herself all day in prayer. Bemused, the duke left Roermond without his daughter. He was still bemused the next month when, having returned home to Gandersheim, he wrote in a letter dated 28 September 1713 that he could tell from the letters that he received from his daughter and her Mother Abbess in Roermond that his poor daughter had taken leave of her senses, becoming so confused by her misfortunes that she no longer wanted to take notice of [his] sensible advice. (Note: "... es ist wohl zu bedauern, daß meine arme Tochter, sich selbst gelassen, und die keinen guten Rat annehmen will, durch ihr Unglück so verwirret ist geworden, daß sie fast nicht recht mehr weiß, was sie beginnet, ...") It also appears from the duke's letter that Henriette Christine had arranged for her infant son to be brought to Roermond so that she could see him, even if only at a distance. (Note: "... daß sie ihr Kind nach Roermond hatte kommen lassen, um es, wenn auch nur aus der Ferne, sehen zu können".) The father evidently had no scintilla of comprehension over his daughter's action in this respect. Meanwhile, in October 1713 she continued to reject her father's imprecations that she should become a properly qualified nun. According to a letter from the abbot in Roermond, by 26 October 1713 Henriette Christine had left the Cistercian house and moved to the nearby Ursuline convent which would normally have been expected to take her towards a more secular version of the consecrated life. The questions that this move begs must go unanswered, since the abbot who reported it died soon afterwards, and Duke Anthony Ulrich died in March 1714. The correspondence breaks off.

=== Later life ===
Like her father, Henriette Christine lived a long life. Almost half of her life was led in a religious community in Roermond, but there is very little surviving information on her life there. She remained in touch with friends from her life in Gandersheim, but the volume of this correspondence tailed off as, one by one, her correspondents died off. Her father appears to have arranged for her to receive a financial allowance from the family coffers. Her later correspondence, addressed to relatives, tends to deal with these financial arrangements in a businesslike manner. (Note: "... Nachdem es Gott dem Herrn noch nicht gefallen, mich aus diesem elenden Leben zu nehmen, bin obligirt, meinen Unterhalt zu erbitten, und schicke zu dem Ende die gewöhnliche Quittung".) When she becomes more personal, it tends to be in order to bemoan, gently, the fact that she is still alive. She seems to have suffered a serious illness during the first half of 1735, after which her tone becomes apologetic: "It is not my fault that it pleases God to keep me alive for so long: I'm only regretful that my home must still be burdened thereby...." (Note: "Es ist meine Schuld nicht, daß es Gott beliebet, mich so lange leben zu lassen, es tut mir leid, daß ich meinem Haus zur Last noch leben muß...") In 1744 she wrote in similar terms to the Duke Karl of Brunswick-Wolfenbüttel, who had been born in 1713, almost a year after Henriette Christine's spectacular fall from respectability. She had many nearer surviving relatives, but they were all female, and Duke Karl, was accordingly now the head of the family in Gandersheim. She thanked him "with heartfelt gratitude that [the family] are so kind as to allow [her] maintenance to be so scrupulously taken care of. I live for a long time because it pleases God, and not through my own intent. Please continue with your patience, in the hope that the Good Lord may compensate for it elsewhere". (Note: "... ich danke Ew. Liebden auch mit herzlicher Erkenntlichkeit, daß sie so gütig sein und meinen Unterhalt so richtig versorgen lassen, ich lebe weil es Gott beliebet noch lange, das ich nicht vermeint, Bitte ferner Geduld zu haben, hoffe daß der gütige Gott es anderwärts ersetzen wird ...") To paraphrase one source that takes its cue from forms of Christian thinking still conventional in the eighteenth century, she "led a life dedicated to prayer and pious works, until recalled from this life on 23 January 1753. If earthly penance should be an effective remedy for a mis-step, then Henriette Christine assuredly deserved forgiveness for hers.
