= Gandersheim Abbey =

Monastery in Lower Saxony, Germany

Coordinates: 51°52′13″N 10°01′34″E

Imperial free secular foundation of Gandersheim Kaiserlich freies weltliches Reichsstift Gandersheim
- 919–1802
- Coat of arms

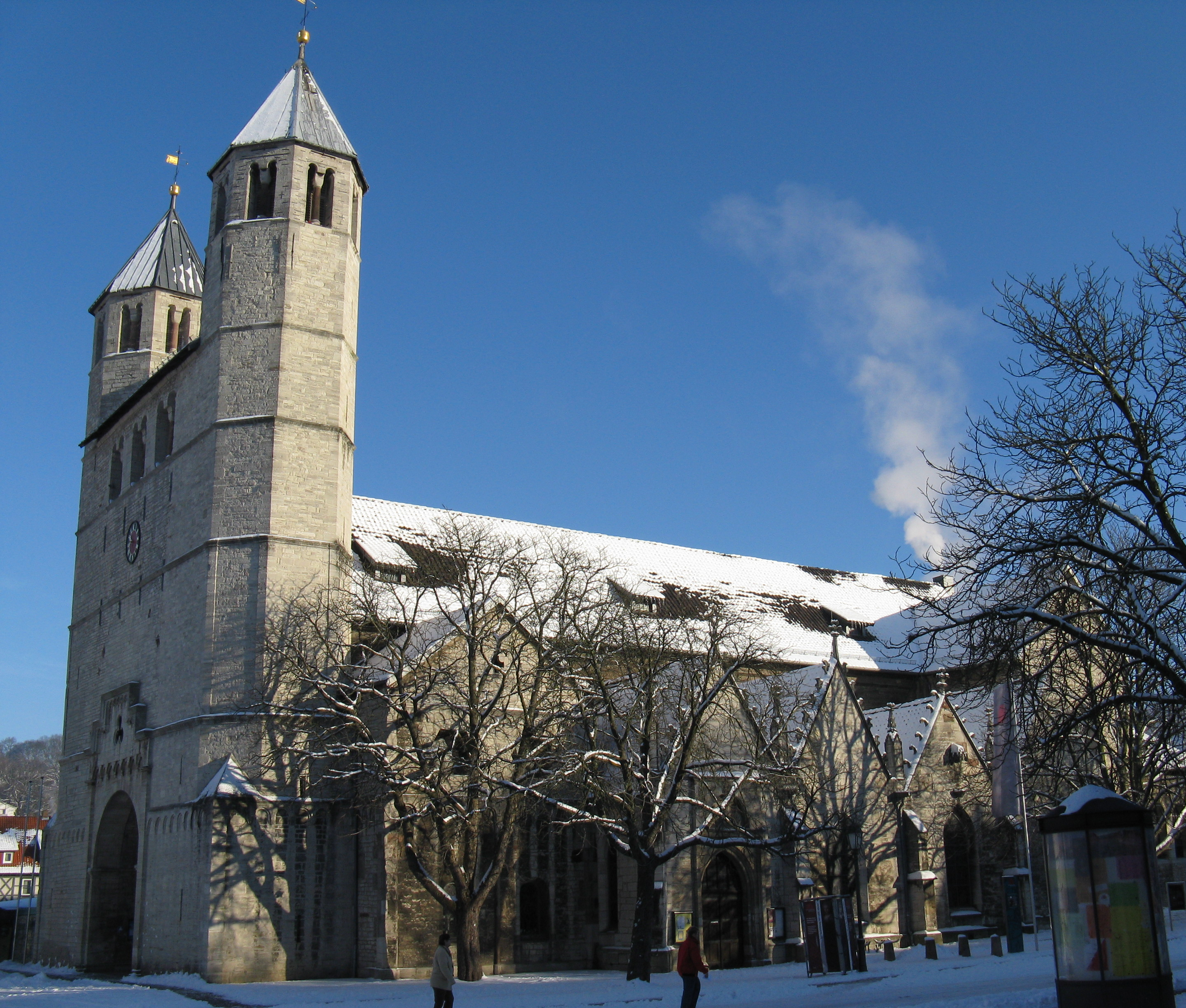
- Gandersheim Abbey church
- Status: Imperial Abbey
- Capital: Gandersheim Abbey
- Common languages: Eastphalian
- Government: Principality
- Historical era: Middle Ages
  - Founded by Liudolf, Duke of Saxony: 852
  - Placed under Imperial protection by Louis the Younger: 877 919
  - Granted Reichsfreiheit by Henry the Fowler: 919
  - Sovereignty confirmed by Pope Innocent III, raised to princely status: 22 June 1206
  - Wolfenbüttel occupied by Schmalkaldic League: 1542
  - Surrendered reichsfreiheit to Wolfenbüttel: 1802
  - Occupied by France under Kingdom of Westphalia: 1807–13
Preceded by	Succeeded by
Duchy of Saxony	Principality of Brunswick-Wolfenbüttel
- Today part of: Germany

Gandersheim Abbey (German: Stift Gandersheim) is a former house of secular canonesses (Frauenstift) in the present town of Bad Gandersheim in Lower Saxony, Germany; at present it is the Evangelical Lutheran Collegiate Church of Saints Anastasius and Innocent at Gandersheim Abbey (German: Evangelisch-lutherische Stiftskirche der Heiligen Anastasius und Innocentius am Stift Gandersheim).

It was founded in 852 by Count Liudolf of Saxony and his wife, Oda, progenitors of the Liudolfing or Ottonian dynasty, whose rich endowments ensured its stability and prosperity.

The "Imperial free secular foundation of Gandersheim" (Kaiserlich freies weltliches Reichsstift Gandersheim), as it was officially known from the 13th century to its dissolution in 1810, was a community of the unmarried daughters of the high nobility, leading a godly life but not under monastic vows, which is the meaning of the word "secular" in the title.

Mass according to the Evangelical Lutheran tradition is held every Sunday at the Evangelical Lutheran Collegiate Church of Saints Anastasius and Innocent at Gandersheim Abbey.

== Church ==
In the collegiate church the original Romanesque church building is still visible, with Gothic extensions. It is a cruciform basilica with two towers on the westwork, consisting of a flat-roofed nave and two vaulted side-aisles. The transept has a square crossing with more or less square arms, with a square choir to the east. Beneath the crossing choir is a hall-crypt. The westwork consist of two towers and a connecting two-storey block; it originally had in addition a projecting entrance hall, also on two storeys, the "paradise". The present church building, which has been subject to restoration in the 19th and 20th centuries, was begun in about 1100 and dedicated in 1168. Remains of the previous building are incorporated into the present structure.

== History ==
=== Foundation ===
Gandersheim Abbey was a proprietary foundation by Count Liudolf of Saxony and his wife, Oda, who during a pilgrimage to Rome in 846 obtained the permission of Pope Sergius II for the new establishment and also the relics of the sainted former popes Anastasius I and Innocent I, who are still the patron saints of the abbey church. The community settled first at Brunshausen (Brunistishusun). The first abbess was Hathumod, a daughter of Liudolf and Oda. In 856 construction began on the church at Gandersheim and in 881 Bishop Wigbert dedicated it to the Saints Anastasius, Innocent and John the Baptist, after which the community moved in.

Already in 877 King Louis the Younger placed the abbey under the protection of the Empire, which gave it extensive independence. In 919 King Henry the Fowler, a grandson of Liudolf and Oda, granted it Imperial immediacy. The close connection to the Empire meant that the abbey was obliged to provide accommodation to the German kings on their travels, and numerous royal visits are recorded.

=== Middle Ages ===
The establishment of the abbey by the founder of the Liudolfingers gave it especial importance during the Ottonian period. Until the foundation of Quedlinburg Abbey in 936, Gandersheim was among the most important Ottonian family institutions, and its church was one of the Ottonian burial places.

The canonesses, commonly known as Stiftsdamen, were allowed private property and, as they had taken no vows, were free at any time to leave the abbey. The Ottonian and Salian kings and their entourages often stayed in Gandersheim, and the canonesses were by no means remote from the world. Apart from the memorial Masses for the founding family, one of the main duties of the canonesses was the education of the daughters of the nobility (who were not obliged to become canonesses themselves).

One of the abbey's best-known canonesses was Roswitha of Gandersheim, famous as the first female poet of the German people. During a period of approximately 20 years – from about 950 to 970 or so – she wrote historical poetry, spiritual pieces and dramas, and the Gesta Ottonis, expressing her veneration of Otto I. She wrote in Latin.

In the Great Gandersheim Conflict, as it is called, originating from the turn of the 10th and 11th centuries, the Bishop of Hildesheim asserted claims over the abbey and its estates, which were located in an area where the boundaries between the Bishopric of Hildesheim and the Archbishop of Mainz were unclear. The pressure from Hildesheim moved the abbey increasingly into the sphere of Mainz. The situation was only eventually resolved by a privilege of Pope Innocent III of 22 June 1206 freeing the abbey once and for all from all claims of Hildesheim, and granting the abbesses the title of Imperial princesses (Reichsfürstinnen).

With the death of the last Salian king in 1125 the importance of the abbey began to diminish and it came more and more under the influence of the local territorial rulers. The Welfs in particular attempted to gain control over the abbey, until its dissolution. The abbey was not able to establish its own territorial lordship. No later than the mid-1270s, the Dukes of Brunswick succeeded in obtaining the Vogtei of the abbey and in the late 13th century built a castle in Gandersheim. Another way to gain influence over the abbey was to place relatives in the abbess's chair. This took the Dukes of Brunswick-Lüneburg rather longer to achieve, but they were at last successful in 1402 with the election of their first family abbess, Sophia III, Princess of Brunswick-Lüneburg.

=== Reformation ===
The Reformation was first introduced into the Principality of Brunswick-Wolfenbüttel in 1542 when troops of the Schmalkaldic League occupied it. The Reformers ignored the abbey's Imperial immediacy and ordained the use of Lutheran church services, the introduction of which however the canonesses were able to postpone on account of the absence of the prioress (Dekanin) who was governing the abbey on behalf of the seven-year-old abbess. The townspeople of Gandersheim had received the Reformation enthusiastically and on 13 July 1543 undertook an iconoclastic attack on the abbey church, where they destroyed images and altars. Henry V changed his mind however and the principality changed back to Roman Catholicism. He made good at least some of the damages, and the church was re-dedicated.

In 1568 the Reformation was again implemented under Julius, Duke of Brunswick-Lüneburg. The abbey and its dependencies at Brunshausen and Clus became Lutheran, and the Marienkloster and the Franciscan friaries were suppressed. A period now began of conflict between the abbess and the duke as both tried to extend their spheres of influence, a conflict which was not settled until 1593 when a treaty finally settled the points of disagreement.

=== Baroque ===
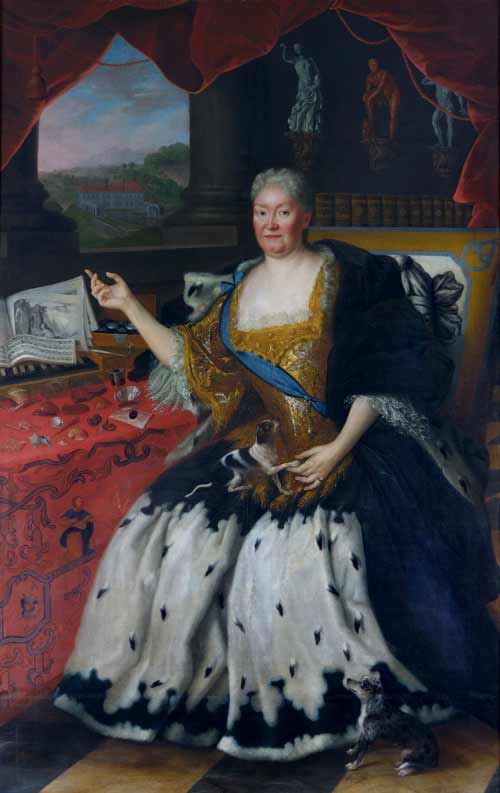
Princess Elisabeth Ernestine Antonie of Saxe-Meiningen, Abbess of Gandersheim

Under the abbesses Henriette Christine of Brunswick-Wolfenbüttel and Elisabeth Ernestine of Saxe-Meiningen there began a new golden age of the abbey. The abbesses promoted arts and sciences. Elisabeth Ernestine Antonie had the summer castle at Brunshausen built, as well as the Baroque wing of the abbey with the Kaisers' Hall (Kaisersaal), and she refurbished the church.

=== Dissolution ===
In 1802, faced with imminent secularisation, the abbey surrendered its Imperial immediacy to the sovereignty of the Dukes of Brunswick-Wolfenbüttel, thus ending the centuries-long struggle with the Welfs.

During the French occupation Gandersheim belonged to the Kingdom of Westphalia. The abbess, who had fled, was permitted by Napoleon to return to the abbey and to live there until her death on 10 March 1810, after which there were no further elections for a successor. The abbey was dissolved and its assets were taken by the Westphalian crown, with the remaining occupants pensioned off.

Even after the end of the Kingdom of Westphalia in 1813 the Duchy of Brunswick did not restore the abbey.

=== Present day ===
The abbey is now used by the Evangelical-Lutheran parochial group of St. Anastasius and St. Innocent. During restoration works in 1997 there came to light some of the old church treasure: relics, textiles and reliquaries. These have been on display since March 2006.

== List of abbesses ==
- Hathumoda 852–74 (daughter of Liudolf, the founder)
- Gerberga I 874–96/7 (daughter of Liudolf, the founder)
- Christina I 896/7–919 (daughter of Liudolf, the founder)
- Liudgard I 919–23
- Hrotsuit (Rotsuita) 923–33
- Wendelgard (Windilgardis, Wildigrat) 933–49
- Gerberga II 949–1001
- Sophie I 1001–39
- Adelheid I 1039–43 (daughter of Emperor Otto II)
- Beatrice I 1044–61 (daughter of Emperor Henry III)
- Adelheid II 1061–96 (daughter of Emperor Henry III)
- Adelheid III 1096–1104
- Frederun (Vrederun) 1104–11
- Agnes I 1111–25
- Bertha I 1126–30
- Liutgard II 1130/31–52
- Adelheid IV, daughter of Fredrick II, Count of Sommerschenburg, and Countess Lutgard of Stade 1152/53–84
- Adelheid V (of Thuringia) 1184–96
- Mechthild I (of Wohldenberg) 1196–1223
- Bertha II 1223–52
- Margarete I (of Plesse) 1253–1305
- Mechthild II (of Wohldenberg) 1305–16
- Sophia II (of Büren) 1317–31
- Jutta (Judith) (of Schwalenberg) 1331–57
- Ermegardis (of Schwalenberg) 1357–58
- Lutgard III (of Hammerstein) 1359–1402
- Sophia III, Duchess of Brunswick-Lüneburg 1402–12
- Agnes II of Brunswick-Grubenhagen 1412–39
- Elisabeth of Dorstadt 1439
- Elisabeth (Ilse), Duchess of Brunswick-Grubenhagen 1439–52
- Sophia IV, Duchess of Brunswick-Grubenhagen (1452) 1467–85
- Walburg (of Spiegelberg), rival abbess 1452–67
- Agnes III, Princess of Anhalt 1485–04
- Gertrud, Countess of Regenstein-Blankenburg 1504–31
- Katharina, Countess of Hohenstein, rival abbess 1504–36
- Maria, Duchess of Brunswick-Wolfenbüttel 1532–39
- Clara, Duchess of Brunswick-Wolfenbüttel 1539–47
- Magdalena of Chlum 1547–77
- Margareta of Chlum 1577–89
- Elisabeth, Duchess of Brunswick-Wolfenbüttel, rival abbess 1577–82
- Margarete of Warberg, rival abbess 1582–87
- Anna Erica (Erich), Countess of Waldeck 1589–1611
- Dorothea Augusta, Duchess of Brunswick-Wolfenbüttel 1611–26
- Catharina Elisabeth, Countess of Oldenburg 1626–49
- Maria Sabina, Countess of Solms 1650–65
- Dorothea Hedwig, Princess of Schleswig-Holstein 1665–78
- Christine Sophie, Duchess of Brunswick-Wolfenbüttel 1678–81
- Christina II, Duchess of Mecklenburg-Schwerin 1681–93
- Henriette Christine, Duchess of Brunswick-Wolfenbüttel 1693–1712
- Marie Elisabeth, Duchess of Mecklenburg-Schwerin 1712–13
- Elisabeth Ernestine Antonie, Duchess of Saxe-Meiningen 1713–66
- Therese Natalie, Duchess of Brunswick-Wolfenbüttel 1767–78
- Augusta Dorothea, Duchess of Brunswick-Wolfenbüttel 1778–1810

== Burials ==
- Agnes of Brunswick-Grubenhagen
- Sophia I, Abbess of Gandersheim
- Liudolf, Duke of Saxony
