= Marie Elisabeth zu Mecklenburg =

Marie Elisabeth, Duchess of Mecklenburg
- Princess Abbess of Gandersheim Abbey
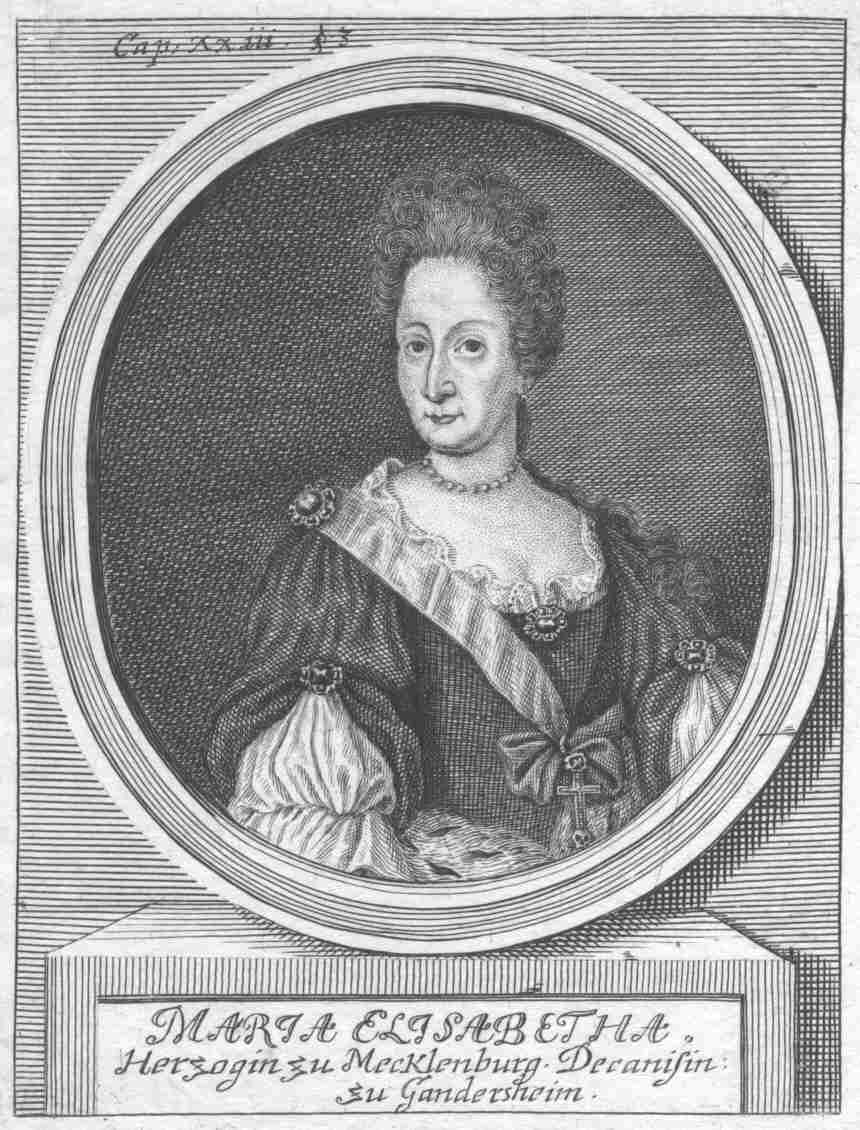
- Reign: 1712–1713
- Predecessor: Henriette Christine of Braunschweig-Wolfenbüttel
- Successor: Elisabeth of Sachsen-Meiningen
- Born: 24 March 1646
- Died: 27 April 1713 (aged 67)
- House: House of Mecklenburg-Schwerin
- Father: Adolf Frederick I, Duke of Mecklenburg
- Mother: Marie Katharina, Duchess of Brunswick-Dannenberg

Marie Elisabeth, Duchess of Mecklenburg (24 March 1646 - 27 April 1713) was a princess of Mecklenburg-Schwerin. In 1712, following the unplanned late pregnancy and ensuing resignation of the formidable incumbent, Henriette Christine of Braunschweig-Wolfenbüttel, Marie Elisabeth became Princess Abbess of Gandersheim Abbey, but she died the next year.

== Biography ==
Marie Elisabeth was the fourth child from the second marriage of Adolf Frederick I, Duke of Mecklenburg. Her mother, Marie Katharina (1616–1665), was the elder daughter of Julius Ernst, Duke of Brunswick-Dannenberg (1571–1636).

After her elder sister, Christina, became Abbess of Gandersheim in 1681, Marie Elisabeth received the consolation of a lesser appointment on 18 December 1682, as Canoness at the Imperial free and secular [Protestant, so not under monastic vows, but nevertheless godly] foundation of Gandersheim She was elected dean (Dekanin) on 24 November 1685, which meant she was deputy to the abbess. However, when the abbess, her sister, died in 1693 she missed out on the top job because her cousin, Anthony Ulrich, Duke of Brunswick-Wolfenbüttel, pushed through the installation of his own younger daughter, Henriette Christine. Marie Elisabeth began to spend less time at Gandersheim, and was again ever more frequently to be found in Mecklenburg. The extent of her absences breached her duties ant the abbey: matters came to a head on 30 July 1709 when the chapter threatened to withdraw her income. The threat appears not to have been carried out, however.

In 1704 she succeeded in becoming regent (acting abbess) at Rühn Abbey, The position had been empty since the death of the previous abbess - who was also Marie Elisabeth's elder sister - in 1701. There were suggestions that Marie Elisabeth had obtained the appointment "through cunning". The appointment to the regency met with opposition from Frederick William, Duke of Mecklenburg-Schwerin, and his nephew, who had been assuming that following the death of the Abbess Juliane Sibylle in 1701 the income from Rühn should come to the duchy. The resulting dispute ended up in the Imperial Chamber Court (Reichskammergericht). The court delivered its "compromise", which effectively backed Marie Elisabeth, on 15 September 1705: she retained the regency appointment (and the income from Rühn Abbey that came with it) till 1712.

In 1712 the 42-year-old Abbess of Gandersheim, Henriette Christine of Brunswick-Wolfenbüttel, suddenly resigned on account of the birth of her illegitimate son. After her signed assent to her withdrawal had been secured, on 29 October 1712, the chapter unanimously elected Marie Elisabeth to succeed her on 3 November 1712. She was "enthroned" on 15 December 1712. However, Marie Elisabeth died the following Spring on 27 April 1713. Her formal investiture with the relevant regalia by the young emperor took place posthumously, on 14 November 1713. Her successor as abbess was Elisabeth of Sachsen-Meiningen.

While she was still alive the Abbess Christina had arranged for the construction of a baroque tomb for herself and her younger sister in the Stiftskirche ("foundation church", frequently identified more loosely as the "cathedral church") at Gandersheim. According to the art-historian Friedrich Schlie, the elaborate style of the tomb resembled that of the Abbess Christina's half-sister, Sophie Agnes (1625–1694), at Rühn Abbey. The inscriptions in Alexandrine verse addressed themes of death and transience, and were composed by the poet-pastor Arnold Gottfried Ballenstedt (1660–1722). Abbess Christina's earthly remains had been placed in this tomb on 3 August 1693. Marie Elisabeth's sarcophagus followed on 11 October 1713. A couple of centuries later, in 1892, Frederick Francis III, Grand Duke of Mecklenburg-Schwerin, had the tomb restored.
