= Gerberga I, Abbess of Gandersheim =

Gerberga I

Abbess of the Imperial Abbey of Gandersheim
- Reign: 874–896/7
- Predecessor: Hathumoda
- Successor: Christina I
- Born: c. 840
- Died: 5 Sep 896/7; Gandersheim Abbey
- House: Ottonian Dynasty
- Father: Liudolf
- Mother: Oda
- Religion: Catholic

Gerberga I (c. 840 – 5 September 896 or 897) was the daughter of the Saxon dux Liudolf, the progenitor of the Liudolfinger, a Saxon dynasty of monarchs. Her mother was Oda. She was abbess of Gandersheim from 874 to her death in 896/7.

== Personal life ==
Information about her life is unsure, and her birth date is assumed to be between 840 and 850. She died on 5 September of either 896 or 897. Her death date is verified by a Gandersheim obituary.

According to Hrotsvit's Primordia coenobii Gandeshemensis, the history of the Gandersheim community until ca. 919, Gerberga was engaged to a noble called Bernard, but broke the engagement because she felt an inner calling to the church. After he was unable to convince her to change her mind, Bernard went to war with the intention of dying there. Because of the distance of time between Hrotsvit and Gerberga's life, this account could also be a transformation related to Gerberga's piety.

== Career ==
Starting from 874 to her death, she was the successor of her older sister Hathumoda, becoming abbess of Gandersheim Abbey.

Gerberga is also mentioned in Vita et obitus Hathumodae, the vita of her sister, as authored by the monk Agius of Corvey Abbey. According to Agius, she was very familiar with her predecessor and sister Hathumoda, which facilitates the conclusion that Gerberga joined the abbey while Hathumoda was still alive.
