= Ottonian dynasty =

Saxon dynasty of German monarchs (919–1024)

- Country: Duchy of Saxony, Kingdom of Germany, Holy Roman Empire
- Founded: 844; 1182 years ago
- Founder: Liudolf, Duke of Saxony
- Final ruler: Henry II, Holy Roman Emperor
- Titles: Count of Eastphalia; Holy Roman Emperor; King of Germany (King of the Romans); King of Italy; Duke of Saxony

The Ottonian dynasty (German: Ottonen) was a Saxon dynasty of German monarchs (919–1024), named after three of its kings and Holy Roman emperors, especially Otto the Great. It is also known as the Saxon dynasty after the family's origin in the German stem duchy of Saxony. The family itself is also sometimes known as the Liudolfings (Liudolfinger), after its earliest known member Count Liudolf (d. 866) and one of its most common given names. The Ottonian rulers were successors of Conrad I, who was the only German king to rule in East Francia after the Carolingian dynasty.

The Ottonians are associated with the notable military success that transformed the political situation in contemporary Western Europe: "It was the success of the Ottonians in molding the raw materials bequeathed to them into a formidable military machine that made possible the establishment of Germany as the preeminent kingdom in Europe from the tenth through the mid-thirteenth century." They are also associated with a notable cultural movement (especially new literary traditions) known as the Ottonian Renaissance.

After the end of Ottonian rule in 1024, the Salian dynasty went on to occupy the Imperial throne for just over a century, until 1125.

== Origins ==
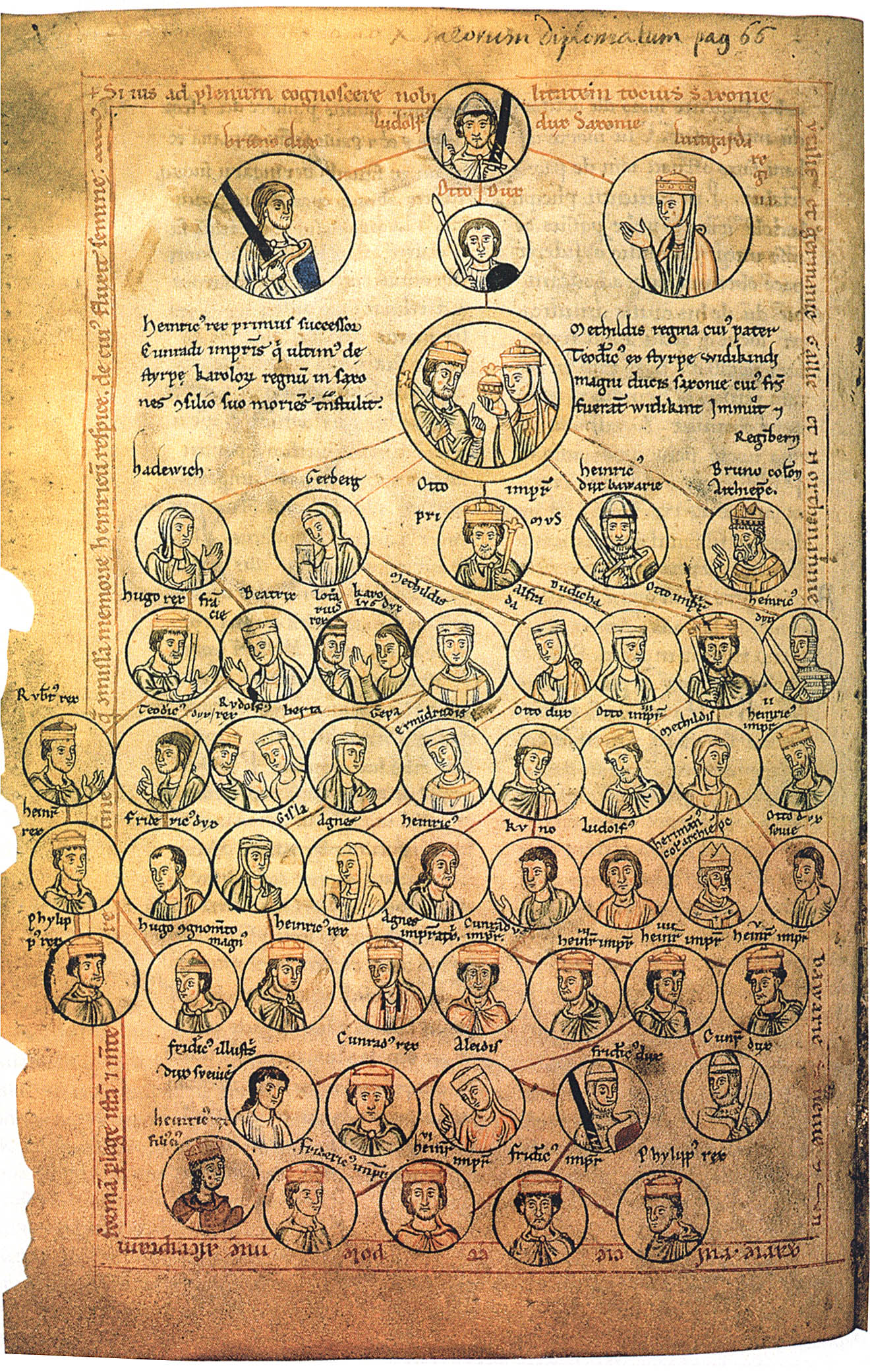
Depiction of the Ottonian family tree in a 13th-century manuscript of the Chronica Sancti Pantaleonis. Liudolf, the founder of the dynasty, is at the top center.

In the 9th century, the Saxon count Liudolf held large estates on the Leine river west of the Harz mountain range and in the adjacent Eichsfeld territory of Thuringia. His ancestors probably acted as ministeriales in the Saxon stem duchy, which had been incorporated into the Carolingian Empire after the Saxon Wars of Charlemagne. The family's substantial holdings in Thuringia suggest that they originated from that region, and their Saxon lands may have been granted as a reward for their service to the Carolingians. Like other powerful Saxons in the mid-9th century, Liudolf was probably descended from noblemen who had aided the Frankish conquest in the latter half of the 8th century. It is likely that Liudolf was related to another "Count Liudolf" who donated lands to the Abbey of Fulda in 780, and an "Adolf" who made another donation of Saxon lands to the Abbey before 802. Liudolf married Oda, a member of the Frankish House of Billung. About 852 the couple together with Bishop Altfrid of Hildesheim founded Brunshausen Abbey, which, once relocated to Gandersheim, rose to a family monastery and burial ground.

Liudolf already held the high social position of a Saxon dux, documented by the marriage of his daughter Liutgard with Louis the Younger, son of the Carolingian king Louis the German in 869. Liudolf's sons Bruno and Otto the Illustrious ruled over large parts of Saxon Eastphalia, moreover, Otto acted as lay abbot of the Imperial abbey of Hersfeld with large estates in Thuringia. He married Hedwiga, a daughter of the Popponid (Elder Babenberg) duke Henry of Franconia. Otto possibly accompanied King Arnulf on his 894 campaign to Italy; the marriage of his daughter Oda with Zwentibold, Arnulf's illegitimate son, documents the efforts of the Carolingian ruler to win the mighty Saxon dynasty over as an ally. According to the Saxon chronicler Widukind of Corvey, upon the death of the last Carolingian king Louis the Child in 911 Otto was already a candidate for the East Frankish crown, which however passed to the Franconian duke Conrad I.

Upon Otto's death in 912, his son Henry the Fowler succeeded him as Duke of Saxony. Henry had married Matilda of Ringelheim, a descendant of the legendary Saxon ruler Widukind and heiress to extended estates in Westphalia.

== Reign ==
The Ottonian kings Holy Roman emperors were:

- Henry the Fowler, duke of Saxony from 912, king of East Francia from 919 until 936
- Otto the Great, duke of Saxony and king of East Francia from 936, king of Italy from 951, emperor from 962 until 973
- Otto II, co-ruler from 961, emperor from 967, sole ruler from 973 until 983
- Otto III, king of Germany from 983, emperor from 996 until 1002
- Henry II, the Saint, duke of Bavaria from 995, king of Germany from 1002, king of Italy from 1004, emperor from 1002 until 1024

=== Henry I ===
Although never emperor, Henry the Fowler was arguably the founder of the imperial dynasty. While East Francia under the rule of the last Carolingian kings was ravaged by Hungarian invasions, he was chosen to be primus inter pares among the German dukes. Elected Rex Francorum in May 919, Henry abandoned the claim to dominate the whole disintegrating Carolingian Empire and, unlike his predecessor Conrad I, succeeded in gaining the support of the Franconian, Bavarian, Swabian and Lotharingian dukes. In 933 he led a German army to victory over the Hungarian forces at the Battle of Riade and campaigned both the land of the Polabian Slavs and the Duchy of Bohemia. Because he had assimilated so much power through his conquest, he was able to transfer power to his son Otto I.

=== Otto I ===
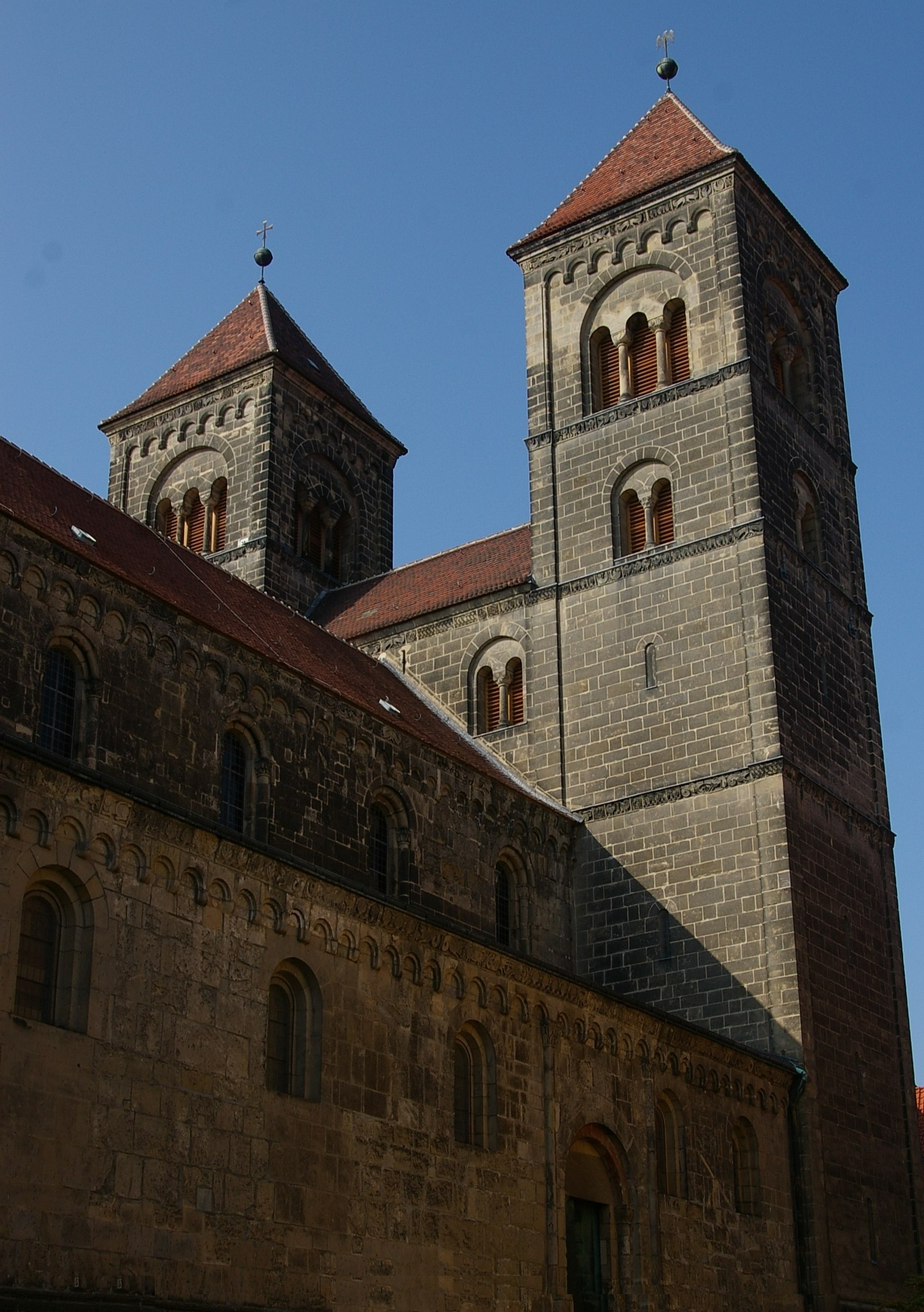
Former collegiate church of St. Servatius in Quedlinburg, founded in 936 by King Otto I, at the request of his mother Queen Matilda, in honor of her late husband, Otto's father, King Henry the Fowler, and as his memorial

Otto I, duke of Saxony upon the death of his father in 936, was elected king within a few weeks. He continued the work of unifying all of the German tribes into a single kingdom, greatly expanding the powers of the king at the expense of the aristocracy. Through strategic marriages and personal appointments, he installed members of his own family in the kingdom's most important duchies. This, however, did not prevent his relatives from entering into civil war: both Otto's brother Duke Henry I of Bavaria and his son Duke Liudolf of Swabia revolted against his rule. Otto was able to suppress their uprisings, in consequence, the various dukes, who had previously been co-equals with the king, were reduced to royal subjects under the king's authority. Otto's decisive victory over the Magyars at the Battle of Lechfeld in 955 ended the threat of Hungarian invasions and secured his hold over his kingdom.

The defeat of the pagan Magyars earned King Otto the reputation as the savior of Christendom and the epithet "the Great". He transformed the Church in Germany into a kind of proprietary church and major royal power base to which he donated charity and for the creation of which his family was responsible. By 961, Otto had conquered the Kingdom of Italy, which was a troublesome inheritance that none wanted, and extended his kingdom's borders to the north, east, and south. In control of much of central and southern Europe, the patronage of Otto and his immediate successors caused a limited cultural renaissance of the arts and architecture. He confirmed the 754 Donation of Pepin and, with recourse to the concept of translatio imperii in the succession of Charlemagne, proceeded to Rome to have himself crowned Holy Roman emperor by Pope John XII in 962. He even reached a settlement with the Byzantine emperor John I Tzimiskes by marrying his son and heir Otto II to John's niece Theophanu. In 968 he established the Archbishopric of Magdeburg at his long-time residence.

=== Otto II ===
Co-ruler with his father since 961 and crowned emperor in 967, Otto II ascended the throne at the age of 18. By excluding the Bavarian line of Ottonians from the line of succession, he strengthened Imperial authority and secured his own son's succession to the Imperial throne. During his reign, Otto II attempted to annex the whole of Italy into the Empire, bringing him into conflict with the Byzantine emperor and with the Saracens of the Fatimid Caliphate. His campaign against the Saracens ended in 982 with a disastrous defeat at the Battle of Stilo. Moreover, in 983 Otto II experienced a Great Slav Rising against his rule.

Otto II died in 983 at the age of 28 after a ten-year reign. Succeeded by his three-year-old son Otto III as king, his sudden death plunged the Ottonian dynasty into crisis. During her regency for Otto III, Empress Theophanu abandoned her late husband's imperialistic policy and devoted herself entirely to furthering her own agenda in Italy.

=== Otto III ===
When Otto III came of age, he concentrated on securing the rule in the Italian domains, installing his confidants Bruno of Carinthia and Gerbert of Aurillac as popes. In 1000 he made a pilgrimage to the Congress of Gniezno in Poland, establishing the Archdiocese of Gniezno and confirming the royal status of the Piast ruler Bolesław I the Brave. Expelled from Rome in 1001, Otto III died at age 21 the next year, without an opportunity to reconquer the city.

=== Henry II ===
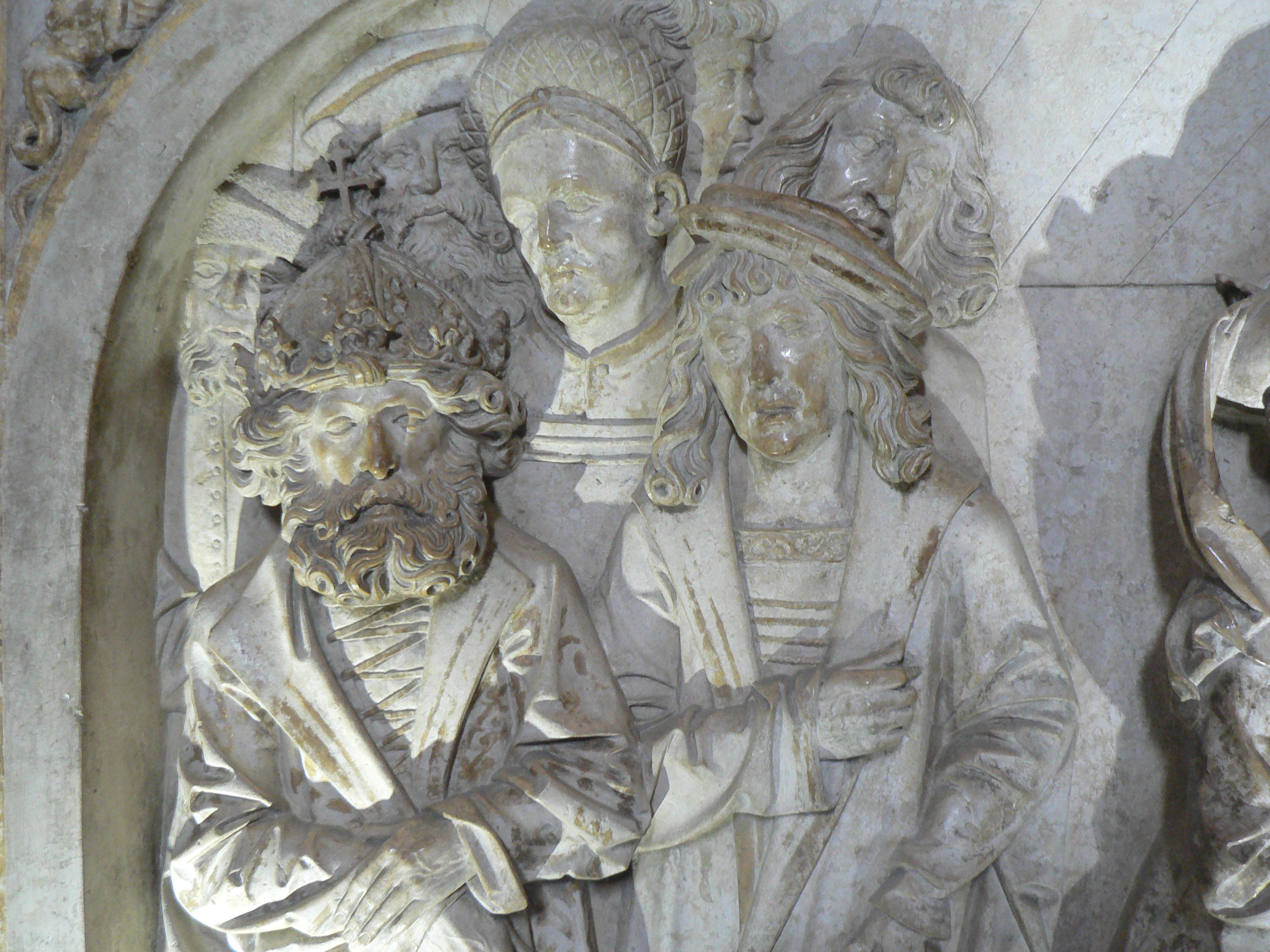
Detail from the monument to Emperor Henry II, built over his tomb in Bamberg Cathedral more than 350 years after his death

The childless Otto III was succeeded by Henry II, a son of Duke Henry II of Bavaria and thereby a member of the Bavarian line of the Ottonians. Duke of Bavaria since 995, he was crowned king on 7 June 1002. Henry II spent the first years of his rule consolidating his political power on the borders of the German kingdom. He waged several campaigns against Bolesław I of Poland and then moved successfully to Italy where he was crowned emperor by Pope Benedict VIII on 14 February 1014. He reinforced his rule by endowing and founding numerous dioceses, such as the Bishopric of Bamberg in 1007, intertwining the secular and ecclesiastical authority over the Empire. Henry II was canonized by Pope Eugene III in 1146.

As his marriage with Cunigunde of Luxembourg remained childless, the Ottonian dynasty became extinct with the death of Henry II in 1024. The crown passed to Conrad II of the Salian dynasty, great-grandson of Liutgarde, a daughter of Otto I. When King Rudolph III of Burgundy died without heirs on 2 February 1032, Conrad II successfully claimed also this kingship on the basis of an inheritance Emperor Henry II had extorted from the former in 1006, having invaded Burgundy to enforce his claim after Rudolph attempted to renounce it in 1016.

== Ottonian rulership ==
Historians have written extensively about how the Ottonian kings and emperors ruled their lands. For some historians, following in the wake of Karl Leyser, Ottonian government was primarily conducted through oral and ritual means, in which the written word took a back seat. Other historians, such as David Bachrach, have argued strongly for the continuing use of writing in administering the Ottonians' far-flung lands. Attention has recently focused on how the rulers took advantage of their royal estates, known as the fisc.

== Genealogy ==
Ottonians and their relatives, with the names of kings and emperors bolded

Liudolf count of Saxony	Oda
Hathumoda abbess of Gandersheim	Bruno count of Saxony	Otto the Illustrious duke of Saxony	Liutgard queen of Germany	Gerberga abbess of Gandersheim	Christina abbess of Gandersheim
**Henry the Fowler** king of Germany	Oda queen of Lotharingia
Thankmar	**Otto the Great** emperor	Gerberga queen of France	Hedwig mother of Hugh Capet	Henry duke of Bavaria	Bruno the Great archbishop of Cologne
William archbishop of Mainz	Liudolf duke of Swabia	Liutgard	**Otto II** emperor	Matilda abbess of Quedlinburg	Henry the Wrangler duke of Bavaria	Gerberga abbess of Gandersheim	Hedwig
Matilda abbess of Essen	Otto duke of Bavaria	Otto duke of Carinthia	Adelaide abbess of Quedlinburg	Sophie abbess of Gandersheim	**Otto III** emperor	Matilda countess palatine of Lotharingia	**Henry II** emperor	Bruno bishop of Augsburg	Gisela queen of Hungary
Henry of Speyer father of Emperor Conrad II	Gregory V pope	Conrad duke of Carinthia	William bishop of Strasbourg

== See also ==
- Ottonian Renaissance
- Ottonian art
- Ottonian architecture
- Concordat of Worms

== Bibliography ==
- Bachrach, D. S. (December 2010). "The Written Word in Carolingian-Style Fiscal Administration under King Henry I, 919-936". German History. 28 (4): 399–423. doi:10.1093/gerhis/ghq108.
- Bachrach, David S. (2014). Warfare in Tenth-Century Germany. Boydell & Brewer. ISBN 978-1-84383-927-9.
- Bachrach, David S (April 2011). "Early Ottonian Warfare: The Perspective from Corvey". Journal of Military History. 75 (2): 393–409.
- Leyser, Karl (1981). "Ottonian government". The English Historical Review. 96 (381): 721–753. doi:10.1093/ehr/XCVI.CCCLXXXI.721. JSTOR 569838.
- Middleton, John (2015). World Monarchies and Dynasties. doi:10.4324/9781315698014. ISBN 978-1-317-45158-7.
- Leyser, Karl (1979). Rule and conflict in an early medieval society: Ottonian Saxony. Edward Arnold. hdl:2027/heb01063.0001.001. ISBN 978-0-7131-6218-9.
- Ranft, P. (2003). Women in Western Intellectual Culture, 600–1500. Springer. ISBN 978-0-230-10825-7.
- Wangerin, Laura (January 2017). "The governance of Ottonian Germany in historiographical perspective: Governance of Ottonian Germany". History Compass. 15 (1) e12367. doi:10.1111/hic3.12367.
- West, Charles (2019). "Royal estates, confiscation and the politics of land in the kingdom of Otto I". Biens publics, biens du roi. Seminari del Centro interuniversitario per la storia e l'archeologia dell'alto medioevo. Vol. 9. pp. 157–177. doi:10.1484/M.SCISAM-EB.5.118742. ISBN 978-2-503-58645-8. S2CID 214096327.
