= Liutgard of Saxony (queen) =

Queen of East Francia from 876 to 882

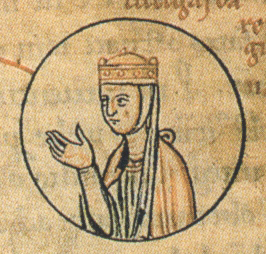
- Liutgard in the pedigree of the Ottonian dynasty, Chronica sancti Pantaleonis, Cologne, 12th century

Queen consort of East Francia
- Tenure: 876–882
- Born: c. 845
- Died: 17 November 885 (aged 39–40)
- Burial: Aschaffenburg, Franconia
- Spouse: Louis the Younger
- Issue: Louis; Hildegard
- House: Ottonian dynasty
- Father: Liudolf of Saxony
- Mother: Oda

Liutgard of Saxony (c. 845 – 17 November 885) was the queen of East Francia from 876 until 882 by her marriage with King Louis the Younger.

== Biography ==
She was born between 840 and 850, the daughter of the Saxon count Liudolf (805/20–866), a progenitor of the Ottonian dynasty (Liudolfings), and his wife Oda (805/06–913).

Liutgard was especially noted for her strong will and political ambition, a reliable supporter of her husband. She is seen as a driving force behind King Louis' struggle with the West Frankish king Charles the Bald around the possession of Lotharingia, culminating in the 876 Battle of Andernach and ending in the final acquisition of the Lotharingian realm by the 880 Treaty of Ribemont.

== Marriages and issue ==
Before 29 November 874, Liutgard married Louis the Younger (830/835–882), second son of King Louis the German, at Aschaffenburg, Franconia. They had two children:

- Louis (877–879), reportedly died after a fall from a window of the Imperial palace in Frankfurt.
- Hildegard (c. 879 – after 899), became a nun in Frauenchiemsee Abbey, Bavaria.

== Sources ==
- Widukind of Corvey (2014). Deeds of the Saxons. Translated by Bachrach, Bernard S.; Bachrach, David S. Catholic University of America Press.

German royalty
Preceded by Hemma	Queen consort of East Francia; 876–882	Succeeded by Richardis
