= Pope Innocent I =

Head of the Catholic Church from 401 to 417

Pope Saint Innocent I
- Bishop of Rome
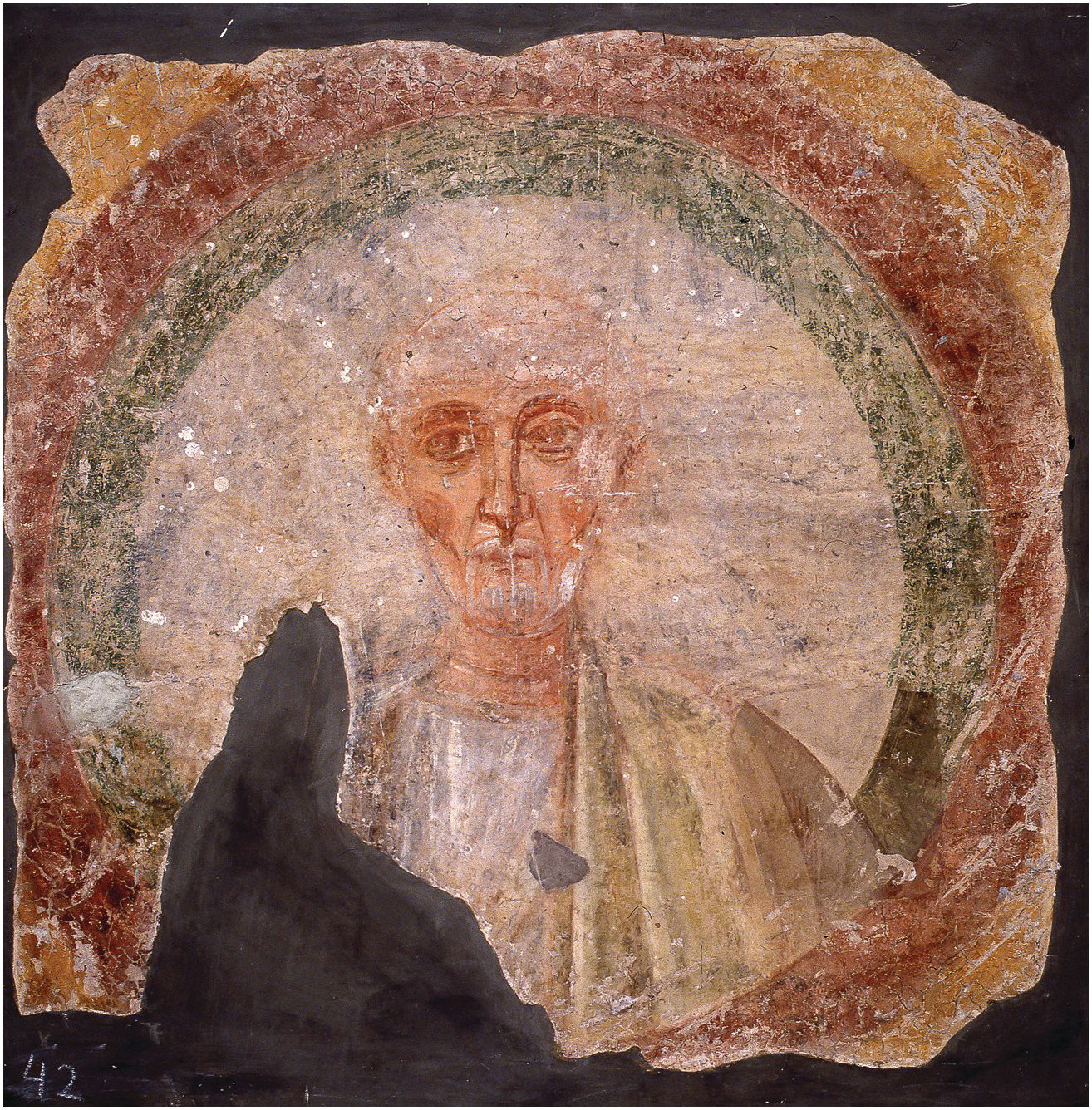
- Fresco originally located in the Basilica of Saint Paul Outside the Walls, c. 450
- Church: Catholic Church
- Papacy began: 22 December 401
- Papacy ended: 12 March 417
- Predecessor: Anastasius I
- Successor: Zosimus

Personal details
- Born: Albano, Italy, Roman Empire
- Died: 12 March 417 Rome, Italy, Western Roman Empire

Sainthood
- Feast day: 12 March; 28 July (13th–20th centuries)
- Venerated in: Catholic Church; Eastern Orthodox Church

Pope Innocent I (Latin: Innocentius I) was the bishop of Rome from 401 to his death on 12 March 417. From the beginning of his papacy, he was seen as the general arbitrator of ecclesiastical disputes in both the East and the West. He confirmed the prerogatives of the Archbishop of Thessalonica, and issued a decretal on disciplinary matters referred to him by the Bishop of Rouen. He defended the exiled John Chrysostom and consulted with the bishops of Africa concerning the Pelagian controversy, confirming the decisions of the African synods.

The Catholic priest-scholar Johann Peter Kirsch, 1500 years later, described Innocent as a very energetic and highly gifted individual "...who fulfilled admirably the duties of his office".

== Family background ==
According to his biographer in the Liber Pontificalis, Innocent was a native of Albano and the son of a man called Innocentius. On the other hand, in a letter to Demetrias his contemporary Jerome referred to him as the son of the previous pope, Anastasius I. It has, however, been suggested that Jerome was describing a link merely hierarchical rather than biological. According to Urbano Cerri, Pope Innocent was a native of Albania.

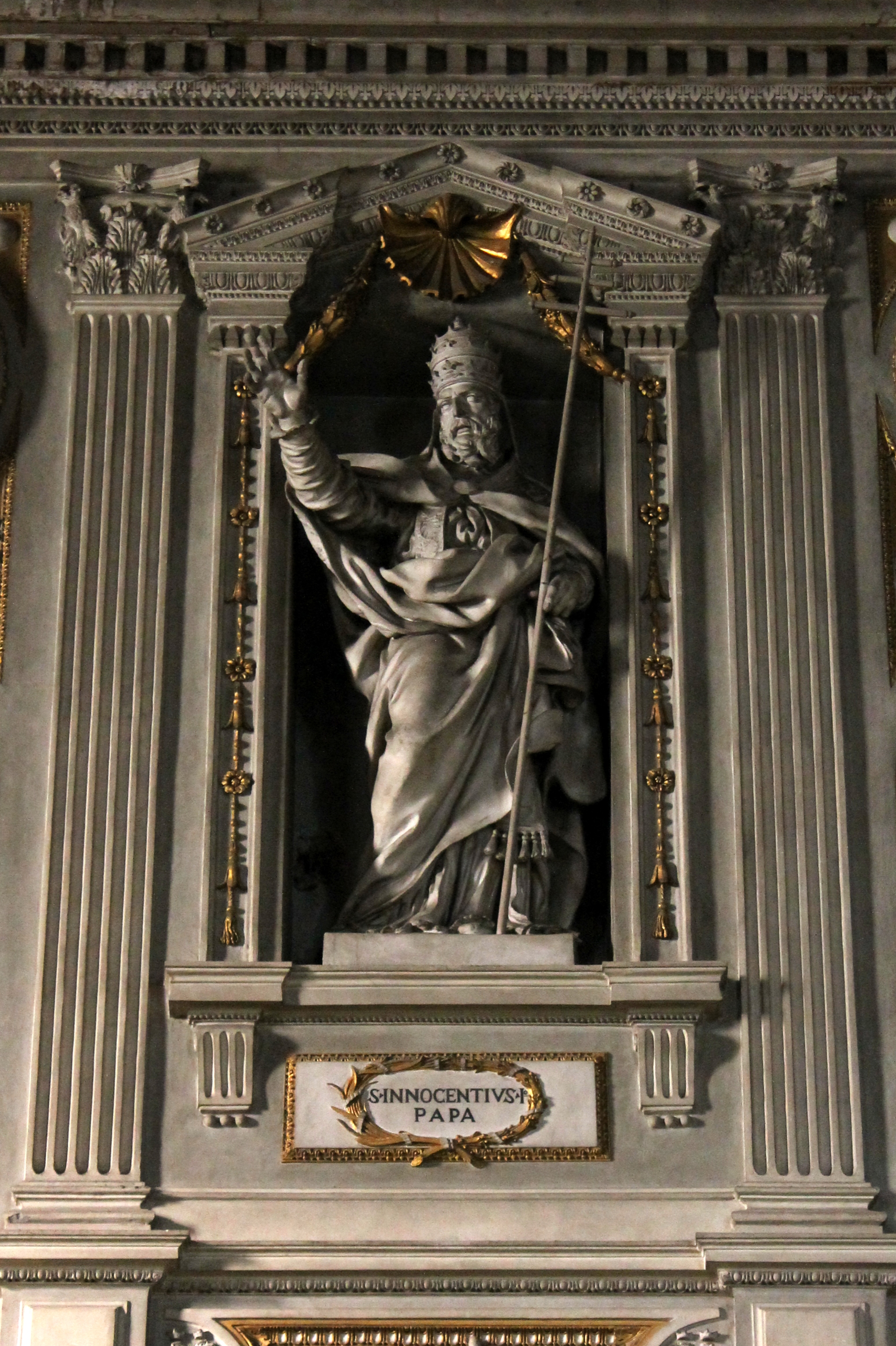
Statue in San Martino ai Monti, Rome

== Pontificate ==
From his appointment in 401, Innocent lost no opportunity to maintain the authority of the Roman apostolic See, seen as final arbiter for all ecclesiastical disputes. That such opportunities were numerous and varied is evident from his communications with Victricius of Rouen, Exuperius of Toulouse, Alexander of Antioch and others, as well as how he acted when John Chrysostom appealed to him against Theophilus of Alexandria. On the Pelagian controversy he took a decided view. He reinforced the decisions of the synod of the province of proconsular Africa, held in Carthage in 416. He accordingly confirmed the condemnation in 411 against Cælestius, who was of the Pelagian view. In the same year he wrote likewise to the fathers of the Numidian synod of Mileve who had appealed to him. Soon after this, five African bishops, among them St. Augustine, wrote a personal letter to Innocent explaining their own position on Pelagianism. In addition he acted as metropolitan over the bishops of Italia Suburbicaria.

The historian Zosimus, in his Historia Nova, suggests that during the sack of Rome in 410 by Alaric I, Innocent I was willing to permit private pagan practices as a temporary measure. However, Zosimus also suggests that this attempt by pagans to restore public worship failed due to lack of public interest, suggesting that Rome in the previous century had been successfully and permanently won over to Christianity.

Among Innocent I's letters is one to Jerome and another to John II, Bishop of Jerusalem, regarding annoyances to which the former had been subjected by the Pelagians at Bethlehem. Innocent's portrayal of the church as an institution "where there is protection for all, ... where there is security, where there is a port that resists the waves, where there is a treasure of infinite goods" was quoted by Pope Gregory XVI in correspondence with the French cleric Félicité de La Mennais in 1833.

He died on 12 March 417. Accordingly, his feast day is now celebrated on 12 March, though from the thirteenth to the twentieth century he was commemorated on 28 July. His successor was Zosimus.

In 405, Pope Innocent sent a list of the sacred books to a Gallic bishop, Exsuperius of Toulouse, identical with that of Trent (which took place more than 1000 years later), except for some uncertainty in the manuscript tradition about whether the letters ascribed to Paul were 14 or only 13, in the latter case possibly implying omission of the Epistle to the Hebrews. Previously in 367, Athanasius of Alexandria had circulated the 39th Easter Letter mentioning the list of Scripture, both Old and New Testament, which he referred to as "canonized".

== Relics ==
In 846, Pope Sergius II gave approval for the relics of St. Innocent to be moved by Count Liudolf of Saxony and his wife, Oda, along with those of his father and predecessor Anastasius, to the crypt of the former collegiate church of Gandersheim, now Gandersheim Abbey, where most rest until this day. Relics were also brought to The Church of Our Lady St Mary of Glastonbury upon its consecration.

== See also ==
- List of Catholic saints
- List of popes

Titles of the Great Christian Church
Preceded by Anastasius I	Pope; 401–417	Succeeded by Zosimus
