= Council of Mainz (852) =

A major assembly of the kingdom of East Francia was held in Mainz on 1 October 852. A church synod under the presidency of Archbishop Hrabanus Maurus was held simultaneously with a royal assembly under King Louis the German.

The secular meeting mostly dealt with issues of justice and receiving embassies. Louis also promulgated the canons agreed by the synod as royal law. These canons of the synod are preserved. They largely repeated what was decreed at the Council of Mainz of 847 concerning baptism, penance, public peace, tithes, care for the poor, the rights and privileges of the church and the rights and duties of it officers. It also declared penalties for violence by laymen and laywomen. Unlike the council of 847, which was only attended by bishops from Mainz's ecclesiastical province, the council of 852 was attended by bishops from throughout the kingdom. The Annals of Fulda draws on the text of the preface to the canons when it describe the assembly:

By the will of the same most serene prince [Louis] a synod was held in the city of Mainz, the metropolitan of Germany, under the presidence of Hrabanus, the reverend archbishop of that town, with all the bishops and abbots of eastern Francia, Bavaria and Saxony. While they were holding meetings to settle ecclesiastical matters, the king with the leading men and the prefects of the provinces was busy with the affairs of the kingdom and with settling disputes. After he had confirmed by his approval the canons of the synod, and had heard and dismissed the embassies of the Bulgars and Slavs, he returned to Bavaria.

The purpose of the embassies from Bulgaria and the Slavs is unclear, but is probably related to a conflict that broke out the following year, as recorded in the Annals of Saint-Bertin. According to these, King Charles of West Francia bribed the Bulgars to attack Louis. The Bulgars engaged the Slavs as allies and in 853 "moved sharply against King Louis of Germany" but were defeated.

Canon 20 declares that anyone who refuses to accept communion from a married priest is anathema. This has been read as a response to a "reform dissidence" in East Francia, a movement also evidenced in Hrabanus' commentary on the Book of Joshua.

== Works cited ==
- Goldberg, Eric J. (2006). Struggle for Empire: Kingship and Conflict under Louis the German, 817–876. Cornell University Press.
- Nelson, Janet L., ed. (1991). The Annals of St-Bertin. Manchester University Press.
- Reuter, Timothy, ed. (1992). The Annals of Fulda. Manchester University Press.
- Russell, Jeffrey Burton (1965). Dissent and Reform in the Early Middle Ages. University of California Press.
