= Christina zu Mecklenburg =

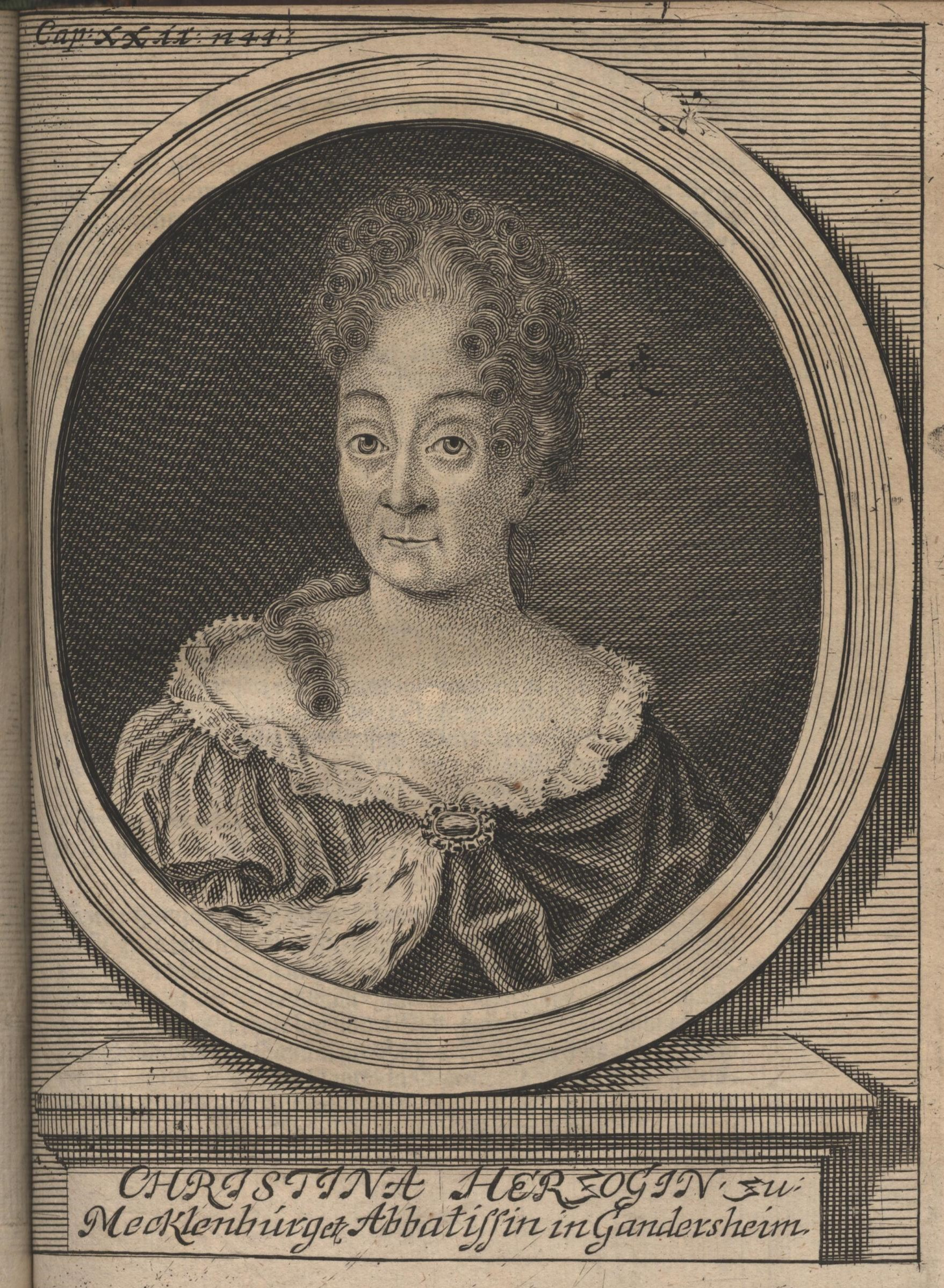
engraving, 1709

Christina, Duchess of Mecklenburg-Schwerin (8 August 1639 - 30 June 1693) was a princess of Mecklenburg-Schwerin. Between 1681 and 1693 she served as the Abbess at Gandersheim. She was also a Princess of the Empire (Reichsfürstin).

== Life ==
Adolf Frederick of Mecklenburg (1588 - 1658) is known to have been the father of at least sixteen legitimate children from his two marriages. Sources differ as to Christina's chronological ranking in the list of her father's children, because not all of them list all the children who died in infancy. According to one source she was her father's eleventh child, and the third by his second marriage. Her mother was Marie Katharina (1616–1665), a daughter of the Duke of Brunswick.

At her mother's request, and through the mediation of her second cousin, Anton Ulric of Braunschweig-Wolfenbüttel, from 1665 she acquired a benefice (income) through her appointment as the then youngest canoness of Gandersheim Abbey.

Despite her relative youth, on 3 October 1665 Christina was elected deaconess at the abbey, on the recommendation of Augustus, Duke of Brunswick-Lüneburg, who was the younger of her mother's surviving uncles. Being deaconess lined her up as deputy and likely successor to the Abbess Dorothea Hedwig, another kinswoman.

However, the Abbess Dorothea Hedwig retired from the post sooner than had been anticipated. In 1677 she attended a Roman Catholic Mass and met with Jesuits while on a visit to Hamburg. Shortly after that she converted to Roman Catholicism. Gandersheim Abbey had by now become a Lutheran foundation. Duke Rudolph Augustus therefore persuaded her to resign as abbess: her resignation took place on 14 July 1678, at a time when Christina, Duchess of Mecklenburg was not yet 40. At this point it was not Christina who took over as abbess but the duke's own young daughter, Christine Sophie. She, however, remained in post only for three years: she left in order to marry a near cousin and adoptive brother, Augustus William, [subsequently - from 1714] Duke of Brunswick-Lüneburg, on 29 June 1681.

This time, on 9 August 1681, Christina of Mecklenburg-Schwerin was elected to succeed Christine Sophie as abbess. Her installation followed on 11 October 1681, following her "capitulatio caesarea" (formal conditional acceptance of the position). Her investiture by the emperor with the appropriate regalia followed on 13 April 1683.

Christina, Duchess of Mecklenburg-Schwerin and Abbess of Gandersheim, died of injury or illness on 30 June 1693. (Note: The cause of her death is given as "... einem Brustschaden" (literally, 'a damage to the breast': there is retrospective speculation that the cause of death might have been either a lung disease leading to pneumonia, or else breast cancer.))

Her successor as Abbess at Gandersheim was her twelve year old cousin, Henriette Christine of Braunschweig-Wolfenbüttel. (Henriette Christine's own tenure as abbess came to an end in 1712 after she gave birth.)

== Celebration ==
While still alive Christina of Mecklenburg-Schwerin took the precaution of having an elaborate baroque tomb created in the lady chapel of the abbey-church at Gandersheim jointly for herself and her sister Marie Elisabeth. (Note: Marie Elisabeth zu Mecklenburg (1646–1713)) The inscriptions are alexandrines which deal with themes of death and things past: they have been attributed to Pastor Arnold Gottfried Ballenstedt (1660–1722).

Her sarcophagus placed in the tomb on 3 August 1693. That of her younger sister followed on the other side of the constriction approximately twenty years later. The tomb was extensively restored at the direction of Grand Duke Frederick Francis III in 1892.
