= Pope Anastasius I =

Head of the Catholic Church from 399 to 401

Pope Saint Anastasius I
- Bishop of Rome
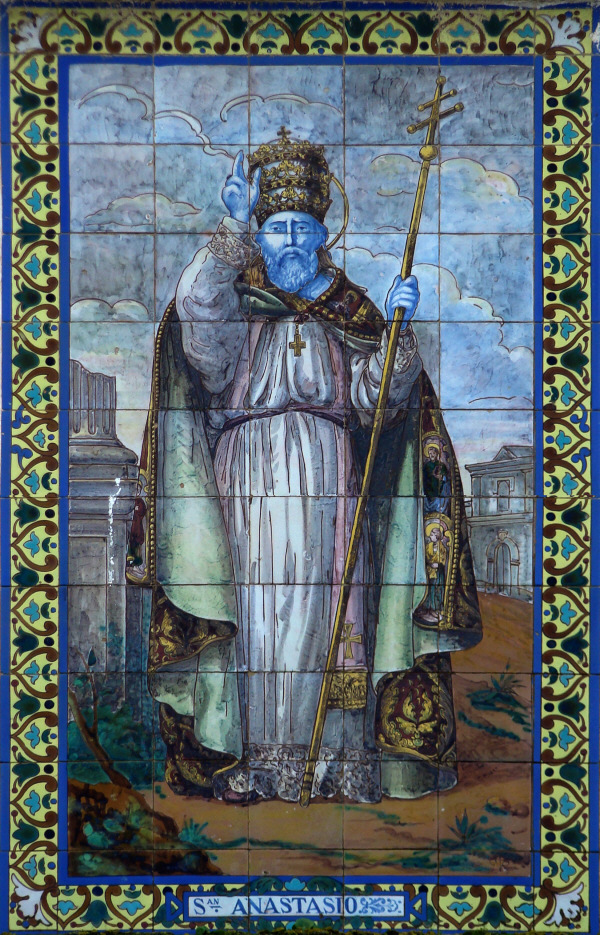
- Azulejo of Anastasius I at Santa Catalina College, Trigueros, by Manuel Rodríguez and Pérez de Tudela (1923)
- Church: Catholic Church
- Papacy began: 27 November 399
- Papacy ended: 19 December 401
- Predecessor: Siricius
- Successor: Innocent I

Personal details
- Died: 19 December 401 Rome, Western Roman Empire

Sainthood
- Feast day: 19 December

Pope Anastasius I was the bishop of Rome from 27 November 399 to his death on 19 December 401.

Anastasius was born in Rome, and was the son of Maximus. He succeeded Siricius as pope and condemned the writings of the Alexandrian theologian Origen shortly after their translation into Latin. He fought against these writings throughout his papacy, and in 400 he called a council to discuss them. The council agreed that Origen was not faithful to the Church.

If Origen has put forth any other writings, you are to know that they and their author are alike condemned by me. The Lord have you in safe keeping, my lord and brother deservedly held in honour.

— letter to Simplicianus,

During his reign, he also encouraged Christians in North Africa to fight Donatism. He instructed priests to stand and bow their head as they read from the gospels. Among his friends were Augustine, Jerome, and Paulinus. Jerome speaks of him as a man of great holiness who was rich in his poverty. He died in Rome and was eventually buried in the Catacomb of Pontian together with his immediate successor, Innocent I. Jerome also referred to Anastasius as Innocent's father, although scholars have argued this was displaying a hierarchical relationship rather than a biological one.

Titles of the Great Christian Church
Preceded by Siricius	Pope; 399–401	Succeeded by Innocent I
