= Welf II =

Welf II may refer to:

- Welf II, Count of Swabia (died in 1030)
- Welf II, Duke of Bavaria (1072–1120)
