= Imiza of Luxembourg =

German noblewoman

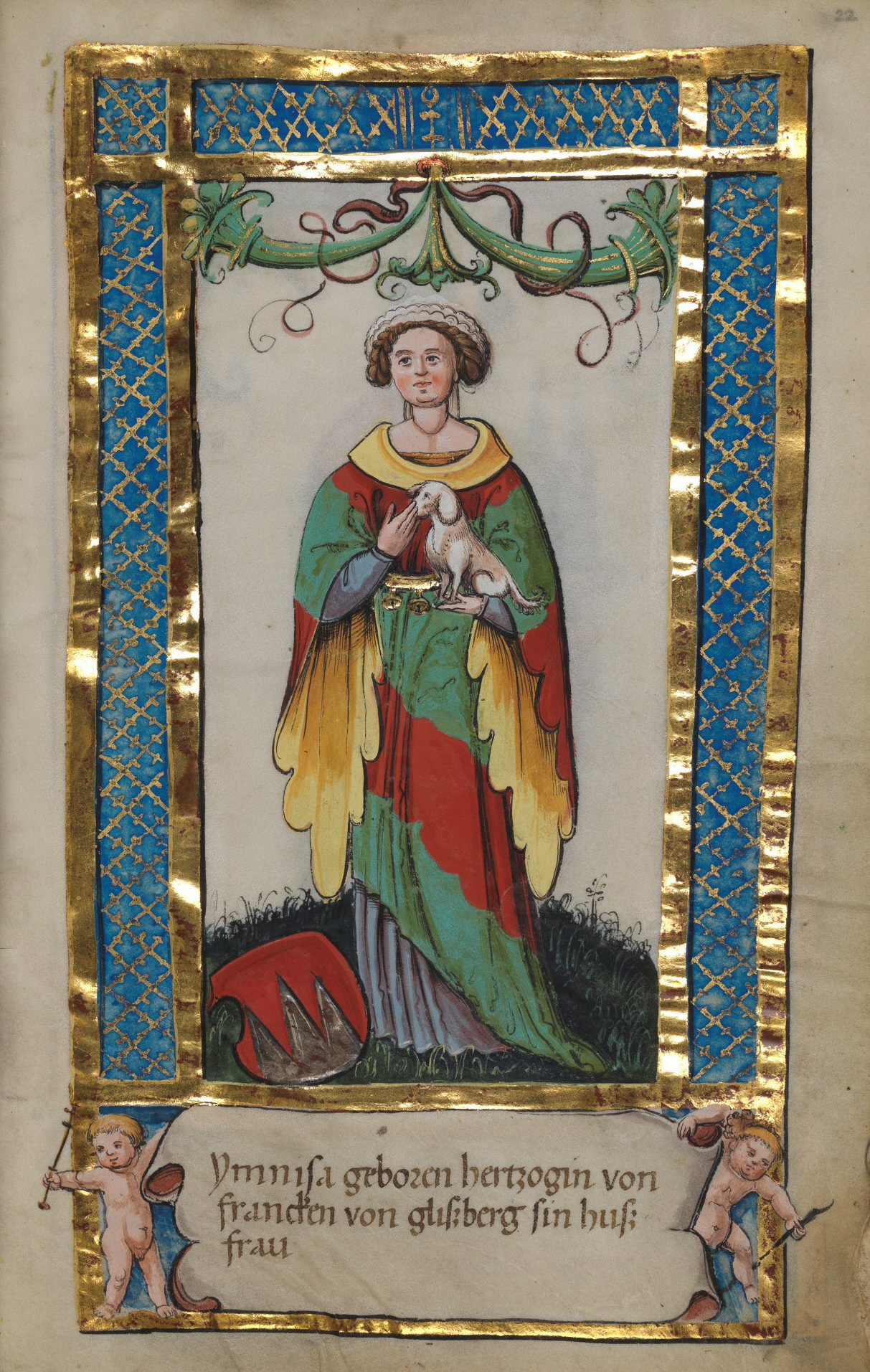
- Imiza in the Weingarten Stifterbüchlein, c. 1510
- Born: c. 990/1000
- Died: after c. 1055/6
- Buried: Altomünster
- Noble family: House of Ardenne–Luxembourg; Elder House of Welf
- Spouse: Welf II, Count of Swabia
- Issue: Kunigunde of Altdorf; Welf III
- Father: Frederick of Luxembourg
- Mother: Ermentrude of Gleiberg

Imiza of Luxembourg (also Irmentrude and Ermentrude) (c. 990/1000 – after c. 1055/6), was a German noblewoman. She was the daughter of Frederick of Luxembourg, and the wife of Welf II of Swabia.

== Life ==
Imiza was the daughter of Frederick of Luxembourg and Ermentrude of Gleiberg. She was a direct descendant of Charlemagne, and her paternal aunt, Cunigunde was married to Emperor Henry II.

She was married to Welf II, Count of Swabia, probably in 1017. Imiza’s dowry included the estates of Mehring am Lech (near Augsburg) and Elisina (modern Solesino). Imiza probably received this property at the intervention of her aunt, Empress Cunigunde. Probably because of this connection Henry II also granted the Duchy of Carinthia to Imiza's son, Welf III (previously Carinthia had been ruled personally by the German emperors).

Imiza outlived her son, Welf III, who never married and had no children. Welf bequeathed his property to the monastery of Altdorf, where his mother had become abbess. She in turn gave the property to Welf IV, her grandson by her daughter Cunigunde.

== Issue ==
With Welf II, Imiza had two children:

- Cuniza (or Cunigunde)
- Welf III

== Sources ==
- K. Baaken, ‘Elisina curtis nobilissima. Welfischer Besitz in der Markgrafschaft Verona und die Datierung der Historia Welforum,’ Deutsches Archiv 55 (1999), 63-94
- H. Dopsch, ‘Welf III und Kärnten,’ in D. Bauer, et al., eds., Welf IV. - Schlüsselfigur einer Wendezeit: Regionale und europäische Perspektiven (Munich, 2004), pp. 84–128.
- W. Glocker, Die Verwandten der Ottonen und ihre Bedeutung in der Politik (Böhlau Verlag, Cologne, Vienna, 1989).
- Hoensch, Jörg K. (2000). Die Luxemburger: Eine spätmittelalterliche Dynastie gesamteuropaischer Bedeutung, 1308-1437 (in German). Verlag W. Kohlhammer.
- H. Renn, Das erste Luxemburger Grafenhaus (963-1136) (Bonn, 1941).
- B. Schneidmüller: Die Welfen. Herrschaft und Erinnerung (819–1252). (Stuttgart, 2000), pp. 119–123
- D. Schwennicke, Europäische Stammtafeln Neue Folge, vol. I.1 (Frankfurt am Main 1998).
- E. Steindorff, Jahrbücher des Deutschen Reichs unter Heinrich III., 2 vols. (Leipzig, 1874-1881), accessible online at: archive.org
- W. Störmer, ‘Die süddeutschen Welfen unter besondere Berücksichtigung ihrer Herrschaftspolitik im bayerisch-schwäbischen Grenzraum,’ in K-L. Ay, L. Maier and J. Jahn, eds., Die Welfen. Landesgeschichtliche Aspekte ihrer Herrschaft (Constance, 1998), pp. 57–96.
- W. Störmer, 'Die Welfen in der Reichspolitik des 11. Jahrhunderts,' Mitteilungen des Instituts für Österreichische Geschichtsforschung 104 (1996), 252-265.
