= Judith of Flanders (died 1095) =

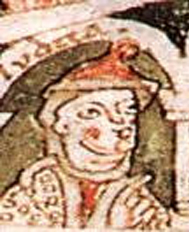

Countess of Northumbria
- Tenure: 1055–1066

Duchess of Bavaria
- Tenure: 1071–1077
- Born: 1032; Bruges
- Died: 5 March 1095
- Burial: Weingarten Abbey
- Spouse: Tostig Godwinson; Welf I, Duke of Bavaria
- Issue: Welf II, Duke of Bavaria; Henry IX, Duke of Bavaria; Kunizza of Bavaria
- House: Flanders
- Father: Baldwin IV, Count of Flanders
- Mother: Eleanor of Normandy

Judith of Flanders (1030–1035 – 5 March 1095) was, by her successive marriages to Tostig Godwinson and Welf I, Countess of Northumbria and Duchess of Bavaria.

She was the owner of many books and illuminated manuscripts, which she bequeathed to Weingarten Abbey (two of which are now held at the Morgan Library & Museum in New York).

== Family ==
Judith was born between 1030 and 1035 in Bruges, the only child of Baldwin IV, Count of Flanders, and his second wife, Eleanor of Normandy, who was herself, the daughter of Richard II of Normandy and Judith of Brittany. She had an older half-brother, Baldwin V, Count of Flanders, who succeeded their father upon his death which had occurred when Judith was about two years old (Some scholars argue that Judith's father was Baldwin V, not Baldwin IV.).

Judith's niece was Matilda of Flanders who married William, the first Norman king of England, known to history as "William the Conqueror". He was Judith's first cousin, being the son of her maternal uncle, Robert of Normandy.

== First marriage ==
On an unknown date before September 1051, she married her first husband, Tostig Godwinson, brother of King Harold II of England. In September 1051, Judith was forced to flee England for Bruges, along with her husband and in-laws, after Tostig's father Godwin, Earl of Wessex, was exiled by King Edward the Confessor; however, they returned home the following year.

He was created Earl of Northumbria in 1055, making Judith the Countess of Northumbria, from that date. His distinguished marriage to Judith had helped Tostig secure the earldom.

Together, they had children whose names and numbers are not recorded. They were described in the Vita Ædwardi Regis as "unweaned" at the time of their father's death. Tostig had at least three illegitimate sons by unknown mistresses.

Judith was described as having been a "pious and inquisitive woman"; her piety was expressed in the many gifts and donations she made to the Church of St Cuthbert in Durham, which included landed estates and an ornate crucifix. The latter allegedly was a present to appease the saint after she challenged St Cuthbert's ruling that forbade women to enter the cathedral which housed his relics. Judith, angered that women were not permitted to set foot inside the church and wishing to worship at his tomb, had decided to put Cuthbert's prohibition to the test by ordering her serving woman to go inside to see what repercussions would follow for breaking the holy decree (Judith had planned to go herself upon the latter's safe return); when the woman was about to enter the churchyard, she was stricken by a sudden, violent force of wind that left her infirm and eventually killed her. Judith, as a result of superstitious fear, had the crucifix especially made for St Cuthbert's shrine. Throughout her life, she collected and commissioned many books and illuminated manuscripts, some of which are extant, including the Gospels of Countess Judith, which are currently housed in Morgan Library & Museum in New York City. These were written and illuminated by English scribes and artists to record for posterity, Judith's generosity to the Church.

In October 1065, Northumbria rose in rebellion against the rule of Tostig. After his brother Harold persuaded King Edward to accept the demands made by the rebels, there was an acrimonious confrontation between the two brothers, with Tostig accusing Harold of fomenting the rebellion. In November, Tostig was outlawed by King Edward, and Judith, along with Tostig and her children, was compelled to seek refuge with her half-brother in Flanders the following month. Count Baldwin appointed Tostig as castellan of Saint-Omer. In May 1066 following the succession of Harold to the English throne in January, he returned to England with a fleet provided by Baldwin to seek revenge on his brother. He formed an alliance with King Harold III of Norway, but they were both killed on 25 September 1066 at the Battle of Stamford Bridge by the forces of King Harold.

After her husband's death at Stamford Bridge, Judith moved to Denmark. It is presumed that she brought her "unweaned" children with her to Denmark; however, nothing certain is known of their subsequent fates. A pair of Norwegian king-sagas, Fagrskinna and Morkinskinna, identify Skuli Konungsfóstri, male-line ancestor of King Inge II of Norway, as son of Tostig, but Heimskringla gives him different parentage. Neither names Judith as his mother. Less than a month after Tostig's death, Judith's brother-in-law was killed at the Battle of Hastings by the Norman army led by her cousin, Duke William, who then became king of England.

== Second marriage ==
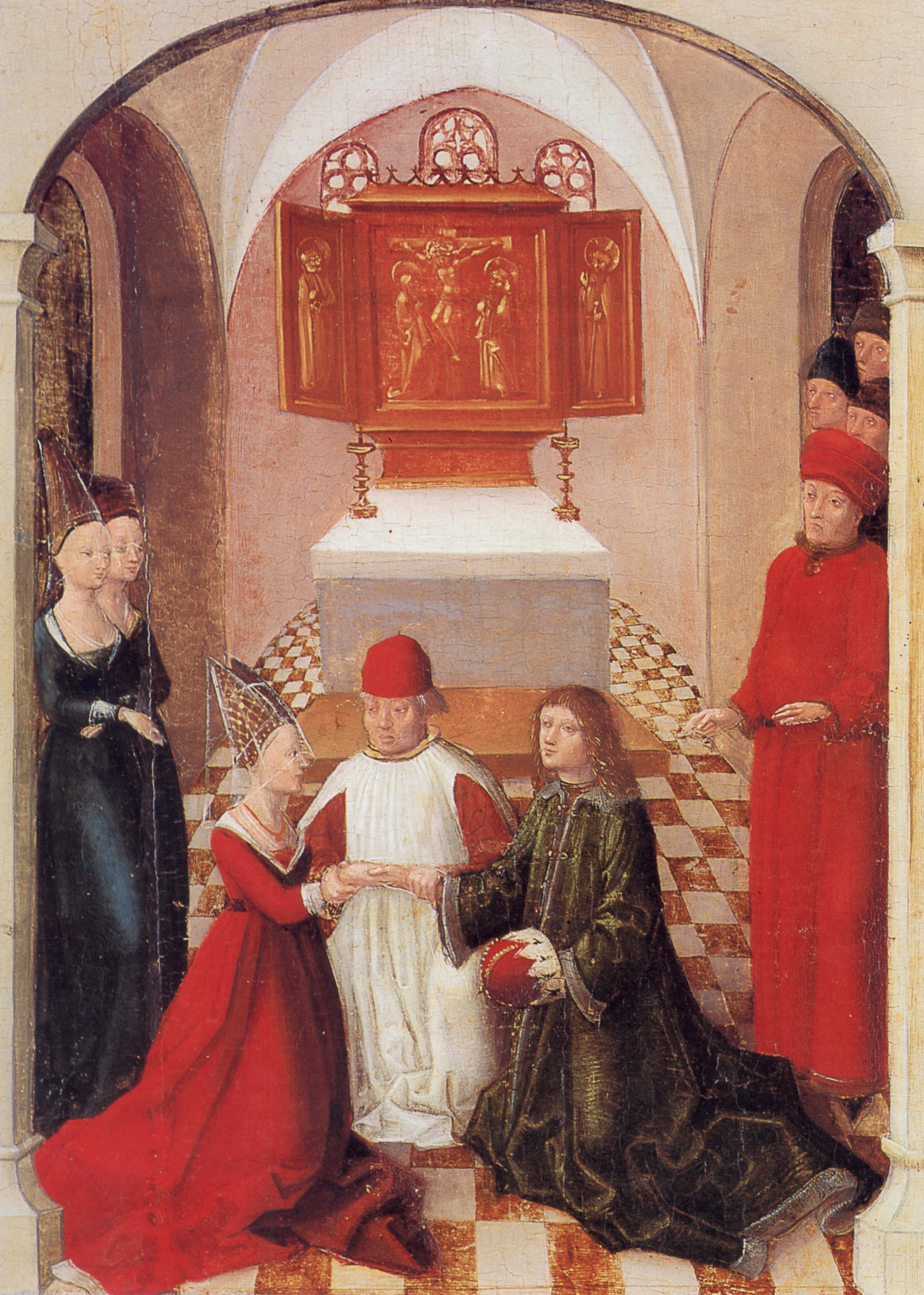
Weingartener Heilig-Blut-Tafel, 1489; Landesmuseum Württemberg, Stuttgart: Judith of Flanders marries Welf I, Duke of Bavaria, her second husband

In 1071, when she was 38 years of age, she married her second husband, Welf I, Duke of Bavaria, who had divorced his first wife, Ethelinde of Northeim in 1070. Upon her marriage, she became Duchess of Bavaria; however, in 1077, her husband was deprived of his title, and did not regain it until 1096, a year after her death.

They made their principal home at the castle of Ravensburg and together, they had three children:

- Welf II, Duke of Bavaria (1072 – 24 September 1120), married Matilda of Tuscany, but the marriage did not produce issue.
- Henry IX, Duke of Bavaria (1074 – 13 December 1126), married Wulfhild of Saxony, by whom he had seven children.
- Kunizza of Bavaria (died 6 March 1120), married Frederich Rocho, Count of Diesen

== Death ==
On 12 March 1094, Judith and her husband listed donations to the family monastery at Weingarten Abbey, where she was buried after her death on 5 March 1095, and where she was (wrongly) remembered as a widowed queen of England. The abbey which had been built by Duke Welf on the Martinsberg in Weingarten, and had received Judith's patronage. She also had bequeathed her magnificent library and a relic of Christ's Blood to the abbey. Her husband Duke Welf died in 1101 in Cyprus while returning home from the First Crusade.

== Sources ==
- Luscombe, David; Riley-Smith, Jonathan, eds. (2006). The New Cambridge Medieval History. Cambridge University Press.
- B. Schneidmüller: Die Welfen. Herrschaft und Erinnerung (819–1252). (Stuttgart, 2000), pp. 119–123
- I. S. Robinson, Henry IV of Germany, 1056–1106 (Cambridge, 2003).
- M. Dockray-Miller, The Books and the Life of Judith of Flanders (Farnham, 2015).
