= Richenza of Swabia =

Countess and German noblewoman

- Born: c. 1025; Germany
- Died: before 1083; Germany
- Noble family: Ezzonids
- Spouses: Herman III, Count of Werl; Otto of Northeim
- Issue Detail: Henry, Margrave of Frisia; Ethelinde of Northeim

Richenza (also spelled as Richeza or Richza) (c. 1025 – before 1083) was a German noblewoman. By her first marriage, she was Countess of Werl. By her second marriage, she was Countess of Northeim, and from 1061 to 1070, Duchess of Bavaria.

She is known as Richenza of Swabia based on the theory that she was a daughter of Duke Otto II of Swabia. However, that theory is hard to maintain with the current state of research.

== Descent ==
Emil Kimpen published a theory in 1933, that Richenza and Ida of Elsdorf might be daughters of Otto II of the Ezzonian dynasty, who was count palatine of Swabia and from 1061 duke of Swabia. Although Kimpen himself later rejected this theory, his students Lange and Hucke included this theory in their theses about the counts of Northeim and Stade. Extensive research into the theory about Ida of Elsdorf has not confirmed this theory. Much less research was done into the theory that her alleged sister Richenza was a daughter of Otto II. On the contrary, this theory was often cited as an explanation for the elevation of her second husband Otto of Northeim to duke of Bavaria.

Later research has cast doubt on this theory. Ursula Lewald pointed out in 1979 that it would be unusual for Otto II's sister to be his heir if he had daughters. Sabine Borchert has pointed out in 2005 that Richenza inherited land in the Elbe-Weser area, suggesting that her family came from that area. She left her sons about 150 oxgangs of land on the left bank of the lower Elbe, next to the land of Wichmann the Younger of the Billung dynasty, suggesting that she might have been a daughter of his brother Egbert the One-Eyed.

== Death ==
There are no reliable sources about her death. It is believed that she died before her second husband, Otto of Northeim, died in 1083. Until recently, it was believed that she died in March; this was based on an entry in the register of the St. Blaise church in Brunswick. However, Sabine Borchert has shown that the Rikce ducissa mentioned in that entry was a 14th-century Duchess. She has suggested 1 May, based on a mysterious note in the obituary of Harsefeld Abbey.

For a while, it was assumed that Richenza had been buried with her second husband before the altar of the St. Nicholas Abbey in Northeim. However, no female skeleton was found when this site was excavated. Borchert has suggested that she may have been buried in the St. Nicholas chapel of the later Harsefeld Abbey — the grave lay of the Counts of State — as she possessed land in the area and her daughter Oda was married to the Count of Stade, who resided there.

== Marriages and issue ==
Richenza married twice. Her first husband was Herman III, Count of Werl. Herman and Richenza had one daughter together:

- Oda (1050 – 11 January 1111), married Lothair Udo II, Margrave of the Nordmark (d. 1082)

After Herman's death, she married Otto of Northeim (d. 1083), who was Duke of Bavaria as Otto II from 1061 until his death. Otto and Richenza had seven children together:

- Henry the Fat, Margrave of Frisia
- Kuno, Count of Beichlingen
- Siegfried III, Count of Boyneburg
- Otto II, Count of Northeim
- Ida, married Thimo the Brave, Count of Brehna
- Ethelinde, married:
  1. Welf I, divorced in 1070
  2. Herman I, Count of Calvelage
- Mathilda, married Conrad II, Count of Arnsberg-Werl
