= County of Calvelage =

Historical county in Lower Saxony

The County of Calvelage existed at the end of the 11th century and in the first half of the 12th century in the region of Vechta in Lower Saxony, Germany.

The Court of Kalvelage in the farming community of Brockdorf in Lohne provided the name for the county. The name disappeared in the 17th century, when it was changed to "Brockdorf" by the lords of the manor from the von Galen family, who were responsible for the area.

The counts of Calvelage, who had property in Vechta and Bersenbrück, acquired areas in Teutoburg Forest northwest of Halle around 1100 and erected Ravensberg Castle. They moved their main residence to the new castle around 1140 and called themselves Counts of Ravensberg from then on.

Counts of Calvelage:

- Hermann I, died probably in 1082, Count of Calvelage; after 1070 he married Ethelinde of Northeim, daughter of Otto of Northeim, 1061-1070 Duke of Bavaria, after he had been deposed and his daughter had been repudiated by his son-in-law and successor, Welf I, Duke of Bavaria 1070-1101 (Welf).
- Hermann von Calvelage, documented to have lived 1115–1134, their son, count in 1120, Count of Calvelage in 1125.
- Otto I, documented to have lived 1140–1170, probably his first son, first Count of Ravensberg; married to Oda, documented to have lived in 1166.
