= Welf, Duke of Carinthia =

11th-century German nobleman

Welf III
- Duke of Carinthia
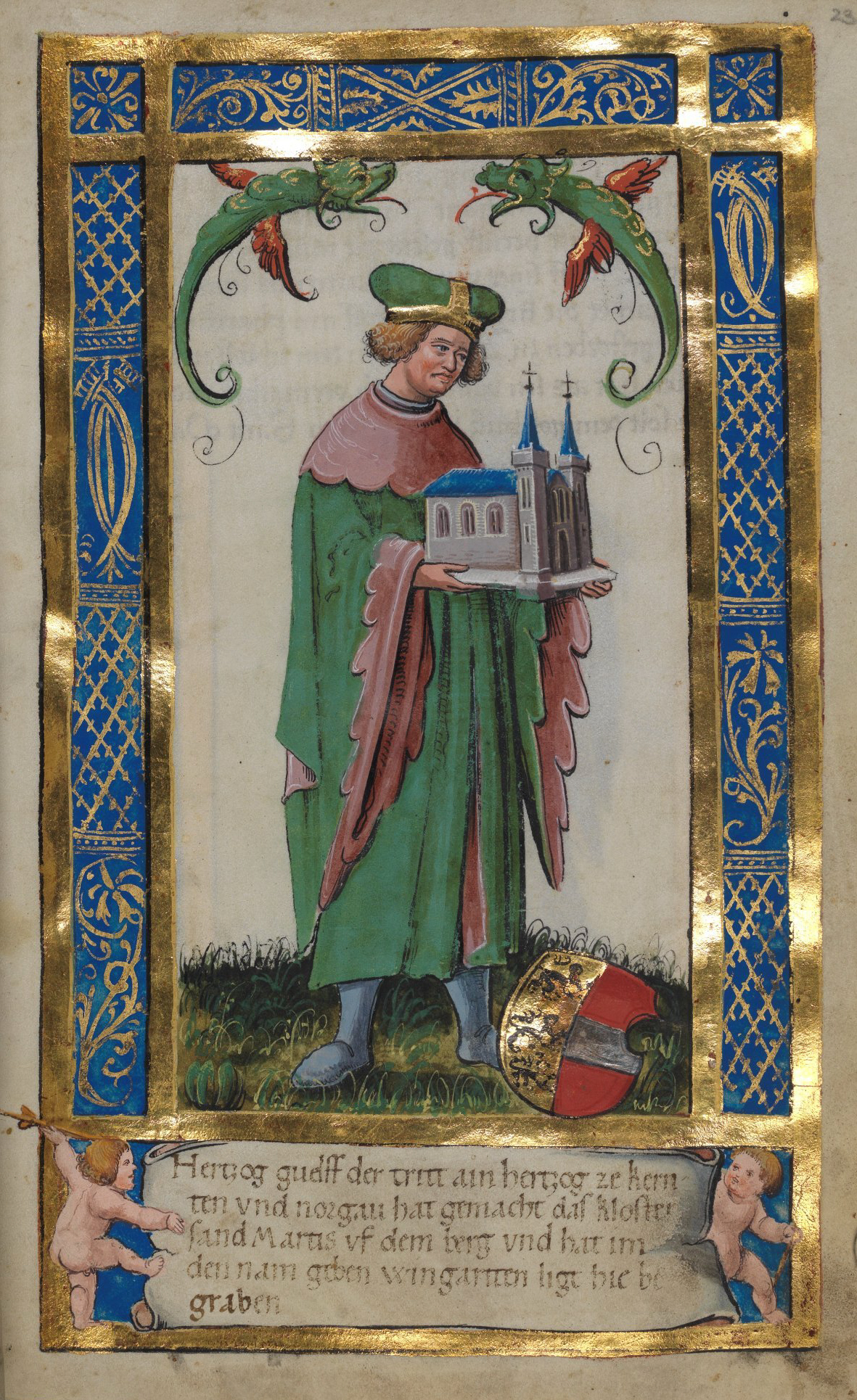
- Duke Welf in the Weingarten Stifterbüchlein, c. 1510
- Born: c. 1007
- Died: 13 November 1055; Bodman Castle
- Buried: Weingarten Abbey
- Noble family: Elder House of Welf
- Father: Welf II, Count of Altdorf
- Mother: Imiza of Luxembourg

Welf III (c. 1007 – 13 November 1055), the last male member of the Swabian line of the Elder House of Welf, was Duke of Carinthia and Margrave of Verona from 1047 until his death.

== Life ==
Welf III was the only son of the Swabian count Welf II of Altdorf (died 1030) and Imiza, a daughter of Count Frederick of Luxembourg and niece of the later empress Cunigunde of Luxembourg. His sister Kunigunde of Altdorf (c. 1020 – 1054) married Margrave Albert Azzo II, of Milan, a member of the Italian House of Este, and became the ancestor of the House of Welf-Este of (Younger) House of Welf.

Upon the death of his father, Welf III succeeded him in the family's extended estates in Swabia and Bavaria. Through the intervention of his aunt, Richlind of Altdorf, he also inherited the property of her late husband Count Adalbero II of Ebersberg in 1045. Probably through his mother, Imiza's, intervention Emperor Henry III enfeoffed Welf in 1047 with the Duchy of Carinthia and the adjacent March of Verona, which after the death of Duke Conrad the Younger in 1039 both had been held personally by the Salian emperor.

Together with Duke Bretislaus I of Bohemia, Welf accompanied Emperor Henry III on his 1051 campaign against King Andrew I of Hungary. Later however, he turned against the emperor and got involved in a conspiracy around the deposed Duke Conrad I of Bavaria, who with Hungarian support raided the Carinthian March of Styria. A plot to assassinate Henry failed, when Duke Welf became confined to his sickbed and revealed the plans.

Welf III never married and had no children when he died at his castle in Bodman on Lake Constance on 13 November 1055. He bequeathed his property to Weingarten Abbey in Altdorf, where his mother was abbess. She in turn gave the property to Duke Welf I of Bavaria, the son of Welf III's sister Kunigunde and Margrave Albert Azzo II of Milan.

Welf III was the last male heir of the Elder Welfs, his patrimonial lands went to the senior branch of the House of Este and the Younger House of Welf. In 1057 Emperor Henry's widow Agnes of Poitou ceded the Carinthian duchy to the Ezzonid scion Conrad III. Welf was buried at Weingarten Abbey.

== Notes ==
Welf, Duke of Carinthia Elder House of Welf Died: 13 November 1055
Preceded by Henry IV	Duke of Carinthia; Margrave of Verona; 1047–1055	Succeeded by Conrad III
