= Richlind of Altdorf =

- Born: c.980
- Died: 12 June 1045
- Noble family: Elder House of Welf
- Spouses: Adalbert II, count of Ebersberg
- Father: Rudolf II, Count of Altdorf
- Mother: Ida of Swabia

Richlind of Altdorf (c.990- 12 June 1045) was a German noblewoman and a member of the Swabian line of the Elder House of Welf.

== Life ==
Richlind was the daughter of Rudolf II, Count of Altdorf and Ita (or Ida), daughter of Conrad I, Duke of Swabia. She was married to Adalbert II, count of Ebersberg. The couple had no children.

When Richlind’s husband, Adalbert, was dying (in March 1045) he made a donation to the monastery of Ebersberg and left his remaining property to his wife. Richlind enlisted the help of Emperor Henry III, to transfer this property to her nephew, Welf III, the son of her brother, Welf II.

Richlind died on 12 June 1045, when a building in which she was standing collapsed.
