= Organ of the Basilica of St. Martin (Weingarten) =

Pipe organ built around windows

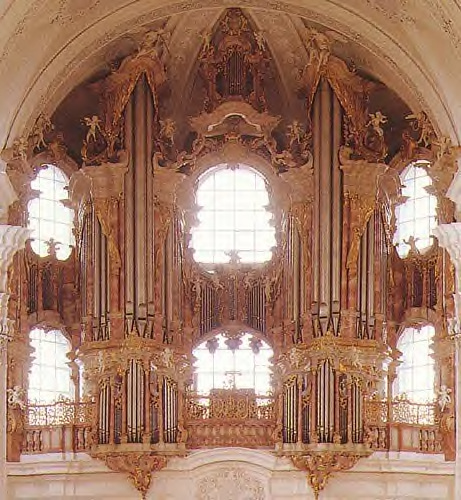
Façade of the organ

The organ at the Basilica of St. Martin (Weingarten), the monastery church of the Weingarten Abbey was built by Joseph Gabler between 1737 and 1750. In addition to the large organ he also built the small choir organ in 1743, but this has since been renovated or completely rebuilt.

== Architectural history ==
=== 1737-1750 rebuilt by Gabler ===
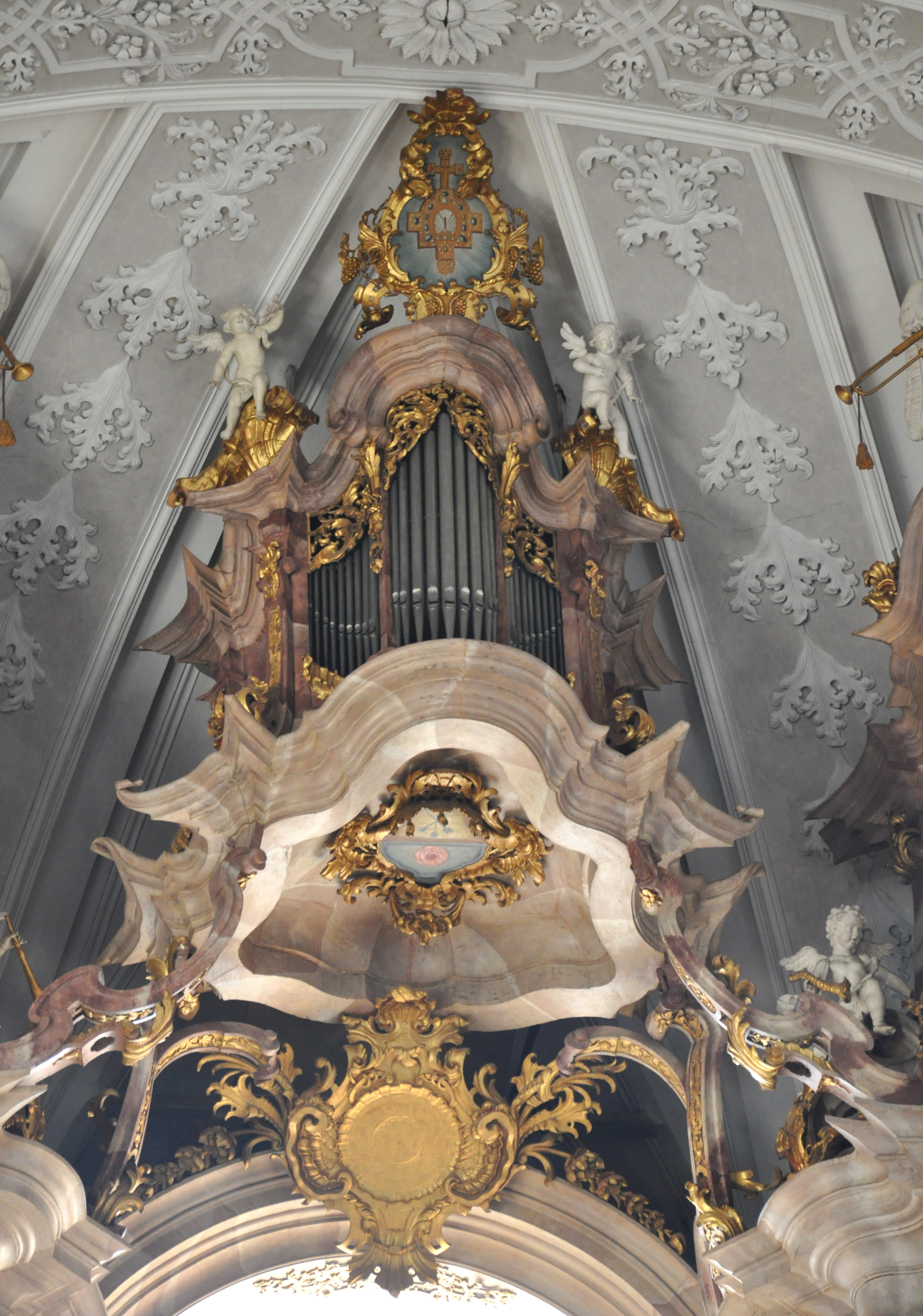
The Crown (Kronwerk) section of the organ, where wind supply was allegedly rather poor

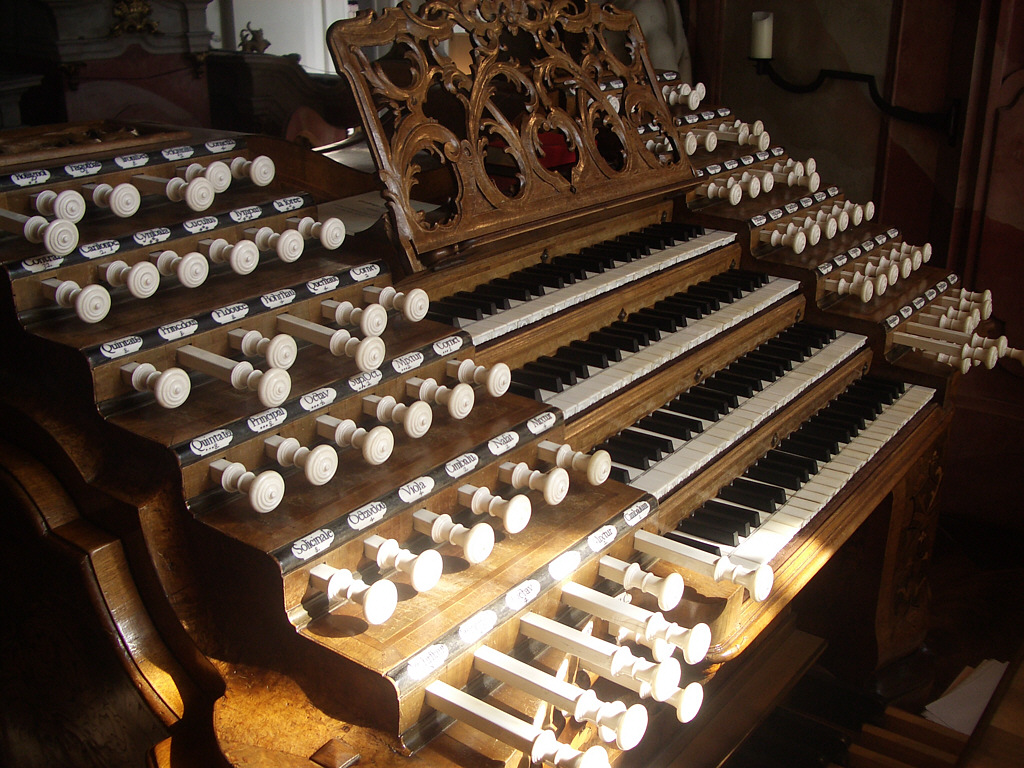
The organ console; notice the stop knobs made of ivory

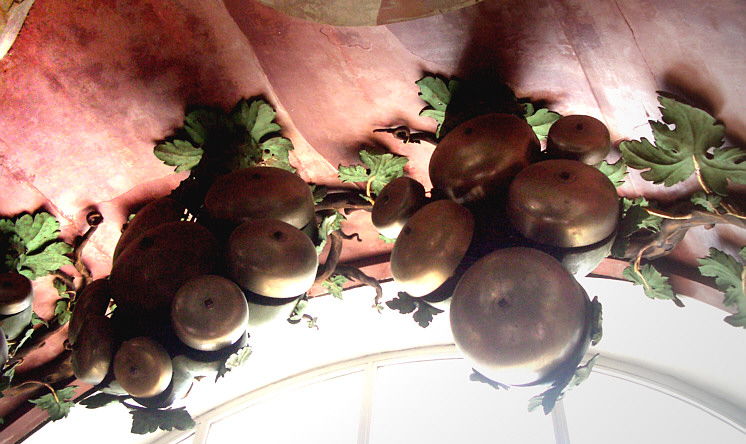
The carillon bells for the pedal, mounted on the arch above the console

On 6 July 1737 the initial contract with Gabler was signed, however, before the completion of the organ it was revised on a number of occasions. In the meantime a fire in the monastery buildings and immense financial difficulties of the abbey made the organ designing and building a very lengthy and grueling process. To make matters worse, Gabler, while an excellent organ builder, was obviously an extremely poor businessman who had neither a sense of money nor had been able to meet deadlines, which meant that he was permanently ruined by this organ. The organ was finally consecrated on 24 June 1750.

The basic problem that Gabler had to solve (with a solution that was deemed downright ingenious), was to build on the west gallery of the church a monumental organ case, without blocking the existing six windows. The Weingarten model was later used by Johann Nepomuk Holzhay to solve an analogous problem in Neresheim in the same way.

The organ has some special characteristics: the principal pipes have generally a narrow scaling, which gives them a restrained dry tone. It has long been puzzling as to why Gabler found it acceptable to scale the pipes considerably narrower than could have been with such a great space to be filled. At times it was thought that Gabler was actually inept as an organ builder as the design had been called into question in his own lifetime, whereas his skills as a carpenter are unanimously considered superior ("... in which he is a paragon master ..."). Today, by contrast, it is assumed that Gabler's designs often favored aesthetics, while scaling of the ranks, he had wanted a more subdued, intimate and gentle sound. In order to give the organ a certain sonorous power and wealth despite the close scaling, Gabler populated the organ with many multi-rank voices, even in the foundation stops. In this way the multi-rank registers (as mixtures) received an unusually high number of pipes. Nevertheless, the organ known for its mild, chamber musical sound that maintains in its fullness a certain introversion.

Also noteworthy is the high number of foundations stops, including many of the string family. Gabler took on a South German Baroque style of organ building (an existing trend) and expanded it into something monumental.

Also worth mentioning is the abundant range of stops which include: Cuculus (cuckoo), Rossignol (nightingale song), timpani, two chimes and the 49-rank mixture "La Force" ("The Power"), although only played by the lowest C in the pedal. La Force was used to signal the beginning of the celebration. While the manual carillon is built into the console, the shell-bells for the pedal are artistically arranged into grape bunches, an appropriate connotation with the monastic name of the Basilica (Weingarten).

The organ is both pure and technically crafted, an absolute masterpiece. The free-standing console, one of the earliest of its kind ever, abounds with intricate inlays and has adorned stop knobs made of solid ivory. The extremely expensive routing of mechanical key and stop action is unmatched, but consequently is hard to play: the keys must be pressed hard to sound the organ due to all the long, heavy mechanisms that must be moved every time a key is pressed.

However Gabler failed at several points of perfecting his ultimately complex concept: the Kronwerk, suspended high up under the vault, was never adequately supplied with wind and was therefore realized only with a greatly reduced disposition. Similarly, Gabler obviously failed in the production of a 32' Bombarde, which was converted by him to a second 16' reed.

=== Restoration by Kuhn 1981-1983 ===
In 1983, the relatively little altered organ was restored by Th. Kuhn AG (Männedorf on Lake Zurich) who aimed in the main to return the instrument to its 1750 state. The pedal range was extended from C-g to C-d' and the unequal temperament was 'defused' to make possible a broader repertory.

=== The organ case ===
The seven sections of the organ are distributed thus: The two main towers accommodate the 32' pipes of the Contrabass and the 16' pipes of the Praestant, standing on the lowest levels and divided into C and C# sides, with the Hauptwerk flanked by the Grosspedal. Above them on both sides is the Oberwerk without its own facade pipes. The Kronpositiv is far above, over the middle window, and displays the Octav douce in its facade. The left and right side towers accommodate the 16' pipes of the double Contrabass. In the adjoining 'bridge' is the Mixturbass 8', and in the bridge directly above the console the 49-rank pedal mixture La Force, which only sounds on bottom C. The Echowerk, which is played on the third manual, is put in the cases under the two main towers, and cannot be seen from the body of the church. From the organ gallery one can see in the facade the Hohlflaut of the Echowerk. On the fourth manual the left (as seen by the observer) of the two Positivs is played, with the Principal doux displayed. Here in the so-called Brüstungspositiv is also the famous Vox humana. The right Positiv belongs to the Brüstungspedal, with the Octavbass 8' in the facade.

== Specification of the organ ==
I Hauptwerk
1.	Praestant	16′
2.	Principal	8′
3.	Rohrflaut	8′
4.	Octav I-II	4'
5.	Superoctav II	2′+1′
6.	Hohlflaut	2′
7.	Mixtur IX-X	2′
8.	Cimbalum XII	1′
9.	Sesquialter VIII-IX	2′
10.	Piffaro V-VII	8′
11.	Trombetten	8′

II Oberwerk
12.	Borduen II-III	16′
13.	Principal Tutti	8′
14.	Violoncell I-III	8′
15.	Coppel	8′
16.	Hohlflaut	8′
17.	Unda maris	8′
18.	Solicinale	8′
19.	Mixtur IX-XII	4′

II Kronpositiv
20.	Octav douce	4′
21.	Viola II	4′+2′
23.	Cimbali II	2′+1′
24.	Nasat	2′

III Echowerk
25.	Borduen	16′
26.	Principal	8′
27.	Flauten	8′
28.	Quintatön	8′
29.	Viola douce	8′
30.	Octav	4′
31.	Hohlflaut I-II	4′
32.	Piffaro doux II	4′
33.	Superoctav	2′
34.	Mixtur V-VI	2′
35.	Cornet V-VI	1′
36.	Hautbois	8′

IV Brüstungspositiv
37.	Principal doux	8′
38.	Flaut douce	8′
39.	Quintatön	8′
40.	Violoncell	8′
41.	Rohrflaut	4′
42.	Querflaut	4′
43.	Flaut travers II	4′
44.	Flageolet	2′
45.	Cornet VIII-XI	2′
46.	Vox humana	8′
47.	Hautbois	4′
	Carillon	2′
	Tremulant

Hauptpedal
48.	Contrabaß II	32′+16′
59.	Subbaß	32′
50.	Octavbaß	16′
51.	Violonbaß II	16′+8′
52.	Mixturbaß V-VIII	8′
53.	Posaunenbaß	16′
54.	Bombard	16′
55.	La force XLIX	2′
	Carillon ped.	2′

Brüstungspedal
56.	Quintatönbaß	16′
57.	Superoctavbaß	8′
58.	Flaut douce	8′
59.	Violoncellbaß	8′
60.	Hohlflautbaß	4′
61.	Cornetbass X-XI	4′
62.	Sesquialter VI-VII	3′
63.	Trombetbaß	8′
64.	Fagottbaß	8′

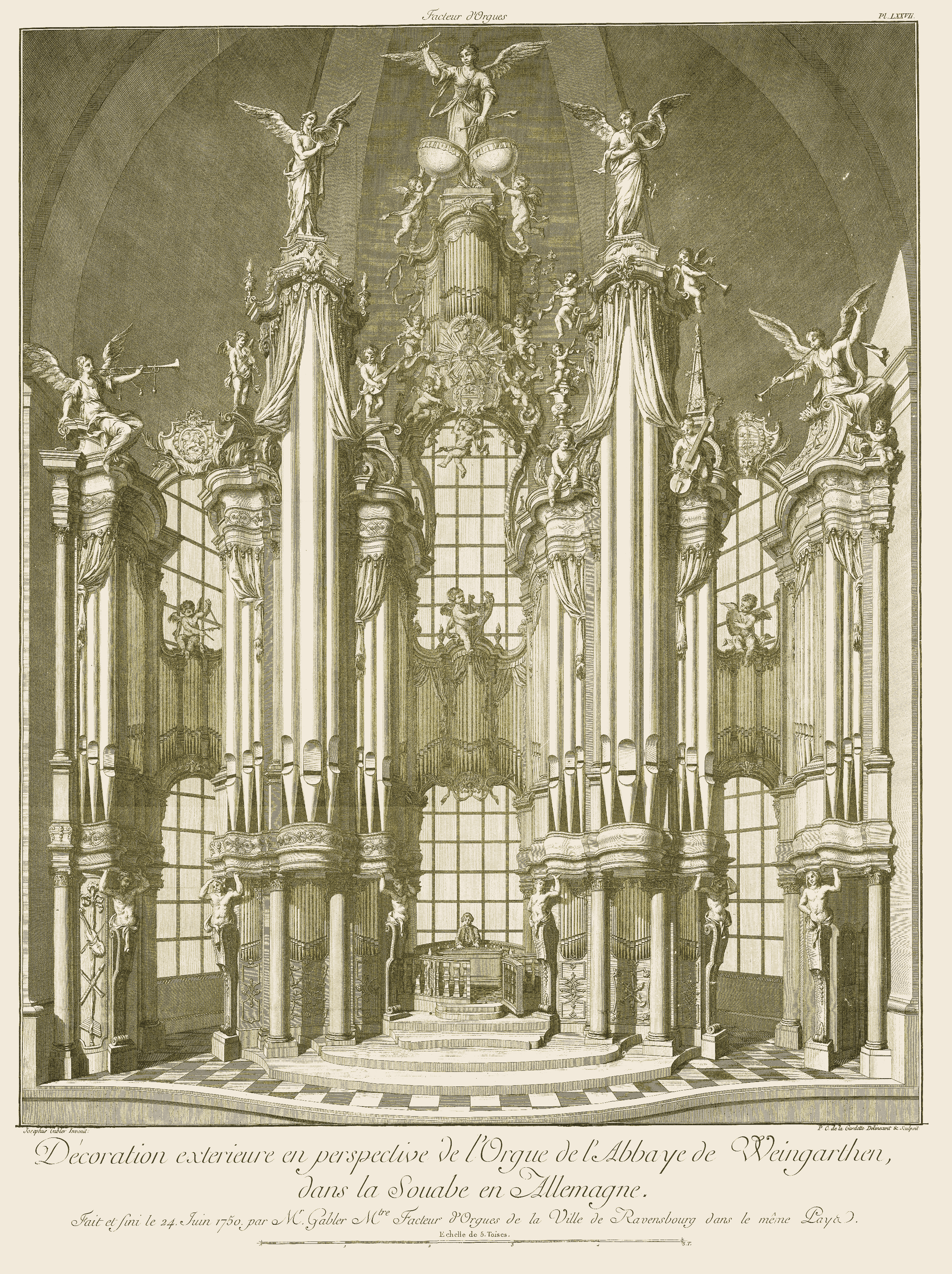
Engraving of the Weingarten organ by Dom Bedos (1766)

=== Auxiliary stops ===
- Cuculus (cuckoo: four wooden pipes with wind power)
- Rossignol (Nightingale: three pipes semi-immersed in a water basin)
- Tympanum (timpani, three wooden pipes (16′) tuned to undulate about the note G)
- Cymbala (three bells with wind power (together with Cuculus))

=== Technical information ===
- 63 stops, 6890 pipes (the forecast for 6666 pipes, pedal extension 6631 pipes).
- Wind power:
  - Frog's mouth or bellows.
  - Wind chests: slider chests.
- Couplers: II/I, III/II, IV/III, IV/I, I/Ped., II/Ped., IV/Ped.
- a' = 430hz. Near-equal temperament.

==== Console ====
- Freestanding.
- 4 manuals(C-c^{3}), keys made of ivory.
- Pedalboard (C-d^{1}).
- Stop knobs of ivory.

==== Action ====
- Key action: mechanical
- Stop action: mechanical.

== Organists ==
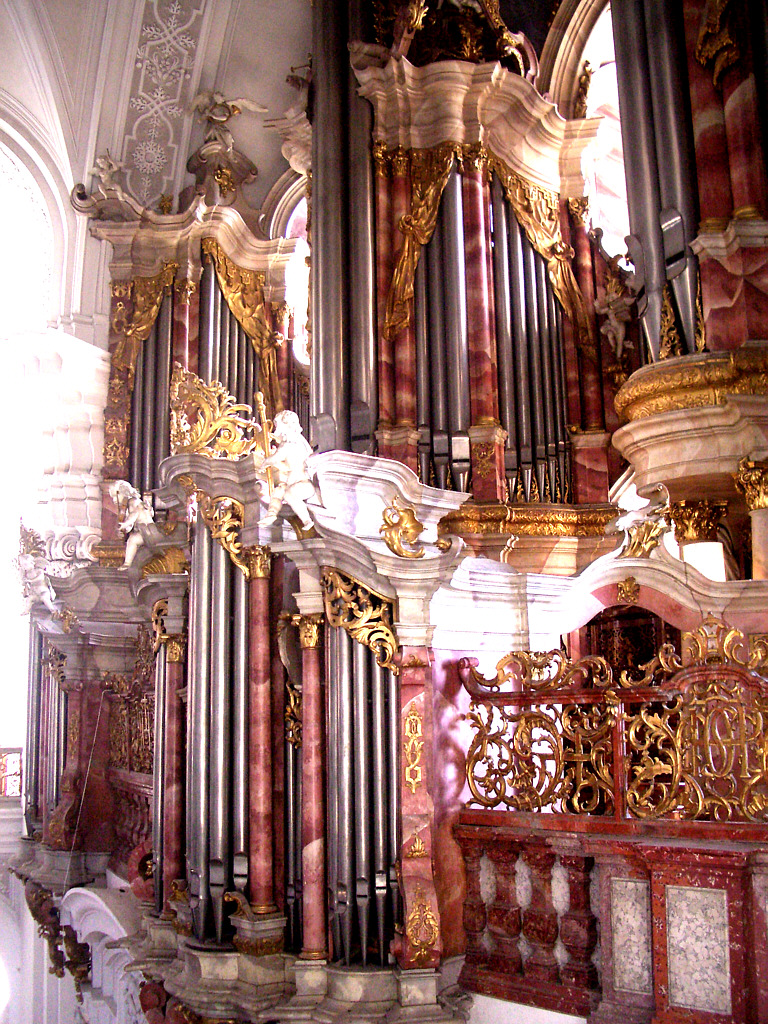
Side-view of the organ

- Jacob Reiner (died 1606)
- Father Paul Rummel (died 1654)
- Father Boniface Kammerer (died 1675)
- Father Roman Frey (died 1694)
- Father Anselm Sulger (died 1675)
- Dog Father Matthew (died 1727)
- Father James Merlett (died 1727)
- Father Meingosus Rottach (died 1760)
- Father Roman Meyer (died 1762)
- Father Bernard choice (died 1786)
- Father Meingosus Gaelle (died 1816)
- From 1807: Father Placidus to Weingarten (died 1819)
- Father Steyer (died 1819)
- 1819-1823 (?): Matthew Fischer
- From 1823: Matthias Gerum (died 1869)
- 1861-1885: Ottmar Dressler (died 1885)
- 1885-1893: Charles Gansloser (died 1921)
- 1892-1917: Joseph Francis Rummel
- 1917-1934: Francis Bärnwick
- 1935-1953: Theodor Lobmiller
- 1954-1999: Henry Hamm (born 1934)
- Since 2000: Stephan Debeur (born 1965)

== Recordings / CDs ==
- Concert at the historic Gabler organ (1750), the Basilica Weingarten. Edition CD loading EL 044th 2008th CD (Stephan Debeur plays works by Handel, servant, Haydn, Bach).
- Christmas organ music in the vineyard. Audite. 2007th CD (Heinrich Hamm plays works by Bach, Pachelbel, Kauffmann, Buttstedt, Zipoli, Murschhauser, Rathgeber, Ahrens).
- The Gabler organ in Weingarten. Audite. 2007th CD (Gerhard Gnann plays works by Vivaldi, Pachelbel, servant, Mozart, Muffat, Bach).
- Ton Koopman plays Bach. First volume Novalis. 2006th CD (organs in Leeuwarden, Weingarten and Ottobeuren)
- Southern German organ music composers of the baroque and rococo monastery. IFO organ 7215.2. 2005th CD (Gerhard Weinberger play works by Metsch, Gass, Büx, Betscher, Gaumer, *Lederer, Kayser and others).
- Johann Sebastian Bach: Passacaglia BWV 582nd Calliope. 2005th CD (André Isoir).
- Johann Ludwig Krebs: Complete Works for Organ. Third volume Motet. 2002nd CD (Beatrice-Maria Weinberger)
- The historical Gabler organ (1750), the Basilica Weingarten. Edition CD loading EL 042nd 2002nd CD (Stephan Debeur plays works by Bach, Eberlin, cancer, Rheinberger, servant, Mendelssohn-Bartholdy).
- Upper Swabian Baroque organ music and classical music. Edition EL loading CD 032nd 2000th CD (Heinrich Hamm plays works by Schneider, Büx, Kayser, Lederer, Bieling, Rosengart, servant, Gaelle, etc.).
- The Queen of the South German Baroque Organ Edition. Loading CD EL 020th 2000th CD (Günther Fetz plays works by Böhm, judges, Pachelbel, Pasquini, Poglietti).
- Johann Ludwig Krebs: Organ Works Vol. First Naxos. 2000th CD (Gerhard Gnann).
- Johann Ludwig Krebs: 12 chorale preludes. BC 1998th CD (G. Weinberger).
- Justin Heinrich Knecht: Organ Works MDGs.. 1997th CD (Franz Rami).
- Johann Christian Heinrich Rinck: organ works. Naxos. 1997th CD (Ludger Lohmann).
- Johann Sebastian Bach: Great Organ Works of famous historical instruments, Vol. First ebs 6012th 1996th CD (Stefan Johannes Bleicher).
- W. Krumbach presents historical organs. Second volume Orch 1994th CD (works by Speth, Walther, Metsch, Paganelli, Scheider).
- Gabler organ, Weingarten. Coronata COR 2213th 1994th CD (Ewald Kooiman plays works by JS Bach).
- Piet Kee at Weingarten. Chandos 0520th 1992nd CD (works by Pachelbel, Walther, Bach).
- U.-Th. Wegele - Baroque & Rococo interim. Tct. 1990th CD (works by cancer, Kittel, CPE Bach, Homilius, WF Bach).
- Organ works of Johann Sebastian Bach (1685–1750). Edition CD loading EL 034th 1985th CD (Henry Hamm).
- The Gabler organ in the Basilica Weingarten motet. 10,801st 1985th CD (Heinrich Hamm plays works by Speth, Muffat, Nauss, Maichelbeck, Marpurg, CPE Bach, Oley, servant).
- The large Gabler organ of the Basilica of the Benedictine Abbey of Weingarten. Christophorus-Verlag SCY 75 110th 1975th LP (Herman Feifel plays works by Bach, Buxtehude and Haydn).
