= Rudolf II of Altdorf =

Rudolf II (also Rudolph; died c. 990) was a count of Altdorf and a member of the Swabian group of the Elder House of Welf.

He was the son of Rudolf I, count of Altdorf, son of Henry, son of Eticho count of Ammergau, son of Welf I. He was married to Ita of Öhningen, daughter of Conrad I, Duke of Swabia. With his wife, Ita, Rudolf had several children, including:

- Henry, count of Altdorf (died c.1000).
- Welf II, Count of Swabia
- Richlind of Altdorf, married Adalbert II, count of Ebersberg (died 1045)
- ? Eberhard, bishop of Bamberg (1007-1041)
- ? Cuno I., count of Sualafeld (died after 1020)

Rudolf died c. 990 and was buried at Altdorf.
