= Adalbero III of Luxembourg =

German nobleman

- Born: c. 1010
- Died: 13 November 1072
- Noble family: House of Ardenne–Luxembourg
- Father: Frederick of Luxembourg

Adalbero III of Luxembourg (c. 1010 – 13 November 1072) was a German nobleman. He was a titular Count of Luxembourg and Bishop of Metz.

Adalbero was the third son of Count Frederick of Luxembourg and a brother of Count Giselbert. In 1047, he succeeded his uncle Dietrich II (d. 30 April 1047) as Bishop of Metz. He distinguished himself by his piety, his education, the prudent manner in which he administered his bishopric and his political influence.

He was a teacher of Bruno of Eguisheim-Dagsburg, who became Bishop of Toul in 1026. In 1049, Adalbero III was present at the meeting in Worms, organized by Emperor Henry III, where Bruno was elected as the imperial candidate to become Pope. Later the people of Rome elected Bruno by acclamation, and he became Pope as Leo IX.

Adalbero III was also present at the council in Rome in 1050 where Bishop Gerard of Toul was canonized.

Emperor Henry IV enfeoffed Adalbero with the County of Saarbrücken.

Adalbero III of Luxembourg House of Ardennes Born: c. 1010 Died: 13 November 1072
Preceded by Dietrich II	Bishop of Metz; 1047-1072	Succeeded by Herman
