= Otto of Nordheim =

11th-century Bavarian nobleman

- Duke of Bavaria
- Reign: 1061–1070
- Born: c. 1020
- Died: 11 January 1083
- Buried: Northeim
- Noble family: House of Nordheim
- Spouse: Richenza of Swabia
- Issue Detail: Henry, Margrave of Frisia; Otto II of Nordheim; Siegfried III; Ethelinde of Northeim
- Father: Bernard, Count of Nordheim
- Mother: Eilika

Otto of Nordheim (c. 1020 – 11 January 1083) was Duke of Bavaria from 1061 until 1070. He was one of the leaders of the Saxon revolt of 1073–1075 and the Saxon revolt of 1077–1088 against King Henry IV of Germany.

== Life ==
=== Family ===
Otto was born about 1020, the son of Count Bernard of Nordheim (d. about 1040) and his wife Eilika. The rich and influential Saxon comital dynasty of Nordheim was first mentioned about 950, its descendance has not been conclusively established: there is possibly a relationship with the Immedinger family of legendary Duke Widukind, while according to the Magdeburg archbishop Eric of Brandenburg, Otto's grandfather Siegfried I of Nordheim was a son of Count Siegfried of Luxembourg.

The Nordheim counts held large Saxon estates on the upper Leine and Werra rivers as well as on the Weser and its Diemel and Nethe tributaries and on the lower Elbe river. They also acted as Vogts (reeves) of the Corvey, Gandersheim, Helmarshausen, Bursfelde, and Amelungsborn. Otto succeeded his father as count of Northeim about 1049, then one of the most influential Saxon nobles along with the Billung duke Bernard II and the Udonid counts of Stade.

=== Role during the regency of Henry IV ===
After the death of the Salian emperor Henry III in 1056, his widow, Dowager Empress Agnes, appointed Otto duke of Bavaria in 1061 in order to gain his support as the mother of, and regent for, the young king Henry IV. The following year (1062), however, when Agnes handed power to her confidant Bishop Henry II of Augsburg, Duke Otto was among those princes who assisted Archbishop Anno II of Cologne in seizing control of Henry IV and the regency, in the so-called Coup of Kaiserswerth.

Otto took a prominent part in the government of the kingdom during Henry's minority. He led a successful expedition into Hungary in 1063 to reinstall King Solomon (betrothed to Henry's sister, Judith of Swabia), who had been driven out by his uncle Béla I. The next year Otto went to Italy to settle a papal schism caused by the appointment of Antipope Honorius II. Otto was also instrumental in securing the banishment from court of the overly powerful Archbishop Adalbert of Hamburg-Bremen. He crossed the Alps in the royal interests on two other occasions and in 1069 shared in two expeditions into the lands of the Polabian Slavs (Wends) east of Germany.

=== Conflict with Henry IV ===
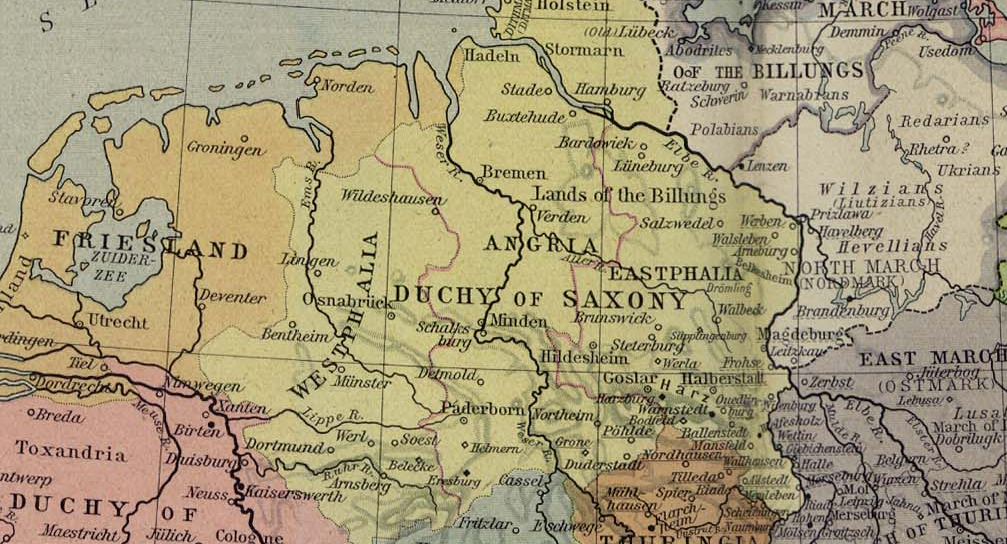
Duchy of Saxony 919-1125

So far, Otto was on good terms with the young king. However, he neglected his Bavarian duchy and instead added to his Saxon allodial possessions in the southern Harz range, which ultimately led into conflict with Henry IV, who aimed at the consolidation of his royal domains in this region. In 1070 dubious accusations were brought against him by one Egeno I of Konradsburg of being privy to a plot to murder the king, and it was decided Otto should submit to trial by combat with his accuser at Goslar.

Fearing for his safety, Otto asked for a safe-conduct to and from the place of meeting. When this was refused he declined to appear and was consequently placed under the imperial ban and deprived of Bavaria, while his Saxon estates were plundered. He obtained no support in Bavaria, but raised an army among the Saxons and carried out a campaign of plunder against Henry until at Pentecost 1071, when he submitted. In the following year he was released from custody and received back his private estates, though not the Bavarian ducal title, which had been granted to his former son-in-law Welf I, the divorced husband of Otto's daughter Ethelinde.

=== Rebellion ===
According to Bruno, author of De bello Saxonico (On the Saxon War), when the Saxon rebellion broke out in summer 1073, Otto delivered an inspiring speech to the assembled nobles at Wormsleben, after which he took command of the insurgents. By the Peace of Gerstungen on 2 February 1074, the Duchy of Bavaria was formally restored to him, which however met strong opposition by the local nobility, with the result that Otto's former son-in-law Welf I remained de facto Duke of Bavaria. He also participated in the second rising of 1075 following the demolition of Harzburg Castle. Defeated in the Battle of Langensalza on June 9, he surrendered and was again pardoned by King Henry who made him administrator of the Saxon duchy.

When the Investiture Controversy between Henry IV and Pope Gregory VII culminated in the excommunication of the king in 1076, Otto attempted to mediate between Henry and the Saxon nobles convened at Trebur, but when these efforts failed he again joined the insurgents. Otto was not the leader of the Saxon revolt, however. Once he was assured that the duchy of Bavaria would be returned to him, Otto accepted the election of Rudolf of Rheinfelden as antiking of Germany. Through his skill and bravery, Otto still inflicted defeats on Henry's forces at the battles of Mellrichstadt, Flarchheim and Hohenmölsen.

=== Death ===
Otto remained in arms against the king until his death on 11 January 1083. He is buried in the Nicolai Chapel in Northeim. His personal estates in Saxony later passed to Lothair of Supplinburg, who about 1100 married Otto's granddaughter Richenza of Northeim. After Richenza, German queen from 1125 and Holy Roman Empress from 1133, died in 1141, the allodial lands were inherited by her daughter Gertrude and her husband, the Welf duke Henry the Proud.

== Character ==
Otto is described as a noble, prudent and warlike man, and he possessed great abilities. His repeated pardons showed that Henry could not afford to neglect such a powerful personality, and his military talents were repeatedly displayed.

== Marriage and children ==
About 1055 Otto married Richenza, formerly reckoned as a daughter of Duke Otto II of Swabia, but probably a descendant of the Billung dynasty. The couple had four sons and three daughters.

- Henry the Fat (1055–1101), Margrave of Frisia (1055–1101)
- Otto II, Count of Nordheim
- Siegfried III (1050–1107), Count of Boyneburg
- Kuno (1050/60–1103), Count of Beichlingen
- Ida, married Count Thimo of Wettin, mother of Margrave Conrad of Meissen
- Ethelinde (born 1050/60, date of death unknown), married Duke Welf I of Bavaria in 1062, divorced 1070; secondly married Herman I, Count of Calvelage in 1070
- Matilda, married Count Konrad II of Werl-Arnsberg

== Notes ==
Otto of Nordheim House of Nordheim Born: c. 1020 Died: 1083
Regnal titles
Preceded by Henry VIII	Duke of Bavaria; 1061–1070	Succeeded by Welf I
