= Ethelinde of Northeim =

Daughter of Otto of Northeim

- Born: c. 1050/1060
- Died: after 1075
- Spouses: Welf I, Duke of Bavaria; Herman of Calvelage
- Father: Otto of Northeim
- Mother: Richenza of Swabia

Ethelinde of Northeim (born 1050/1060, died after 1075) was the daughter of Otto of Northeim and the wife of Welf I, Duke of Bavaria, and Herman of Calvelage.

== Family ==
Ethelinde was the oldest daughter of Otto of Northeim, duke of Bavaria (r.1060-1070) and his wife Richenza of Swabia, who is thought to be the daughter of Otto II, Duke of Swabia.

== First marriage ==
In 1062, when she was at most twelve years old, Ethelinde married Welf I, Duke of Bavaria, son of Albert Azzo II, Margrave of Milan and his wife Kunigunde of Altdorf. In 1070, Ethelinde's father, Otto of Northeim, was accused of being part of a plot to murder Henry IV, and was deprived of the duchy of Bavaria. Welf rejected Ethelinde and sent her back to her father, whom he succeeded as duke of Bavaria. Both Ethelinde and Welf then married other people, but it is not clear on what grounds their marriage was dissolved.

== Second marriage ==
In or after 1070, Ethelinde married for a second time, to Herman I, count of Calvelage. The couple had one son, Herman II of Calvelage (1075-1134).
