= Frederick of Luxembourg =

Count of Moselgau

- Count of Moselgau
- Born: 965 AD
- Died: 6 October 1019 (aged 53–54)
- Noble family: House of Ardenne–Luxembourg
- Spouse: Irmtrud of Wetterau
- Issue: Henry VII, Duke of Bavaria; Frederick, Duke of Lower Lorraine; Giselbert of Luxembourg; Adalbero III of Luxembourg; Ogive, Countess of Flanders; Imiza, Countess of Swabia
- Father: Sigfried, Count of the Ardennes
- Mother: Hedwig of Nordgau

Frederick of Luxembourg (965 – 6 October 1019), Count of Moselgau, was a son of Siegfried of Luxembourg and Hedwig of Nordgau.

Frederick married Irmtrud, daughter of Count Herbert of Wetterau. They had issue:

- Henry VII (d. 1047), Count of Luxembourg and Duke of Bavaria
- Frederick, Duke of Lower Lorraine (1003–1065), Duke of Lower Lorraine
- Giselbert of Luxembourg (1007–1059), Count of Longwy, of Salm, and of Luxembourg
- Adalbéron III (d. 1072), Bishop of Metz
- Thierry of Luxembourg, father of :
  - Thierry (d. 1075)
  - Henry, Count Palatine of Lorraine (d. 1095)
  - Poppon of Metz (d. 1103), Bishop of Metz
- Hermann of Gleiberg
- Ogive of Luxembourg (990/95–1030); married in 1012 to Baldwin IV (980–1035), Count of Flanders
- Imiza of Luxembourg married Welf II of Altdorf, Count in Lechrain (d. 1030)
- Oda of Luxembourg; canoness at Remiremont, then Abbess of Saint-Rémy at Lunéville
- Gisèle of Luxembourg (1019–after 1058); married Radulfe, Lord of Aalst (d. after 1038); parents of Gilbert de Gant

== Sources ==
- Freed, John B. (2016). Frederick Barbarossa: The Prince and the Myth. Yale University Press.
- Jackman, Donald C. (2012). Studia Luxembourgensia. Editions Enplage.
- Jackman, Donald C. (2012a). The Kleeberg Fragment of the Gleiberg County. Editions Enplage.
- Nicholas, David M (2013). Medieval Flanders. Routledge.
- Robinson, Ian, ed. (2004). The Papal Reform of the Eleventh Century: Lives of Pope Leo IX and Pope Gregory VII. Manchester University Press.
