= Welf II of Bavaria =

Duke of Bavaria

Welf II
- Duke of Bavaria
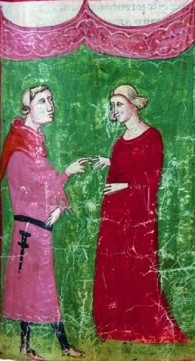
- Born: 1072
- Died: 24 September 1120; Kaufering
- Spouse: Matilda of Tuscany
- House: Welf
- Father: Welf I, Duke of Bavaria
- Mother: Judith of Flanders

Welf II (1072 – 24 September 1120), also known as Welfhard and called Welf the Fat (Latin: pinguis), was Duke of Bavaria from 1101 until his death. He died at Kaufering. In the Welf genealogy, he is counted as Welf V.

== Life ==
Welf was the oldest son of Welf I, Duke of Bavaria, and his wife Judith of Flanders. In 1088 or 1089, when Welf was still a teenager, he married Matilda of Tuscany, who was more than twenty years older than him, in order to strengthen the relation between his family and the pope during the Investiture Controversy between king and pope. During King Henry IV's Italian campaign of 1090, Welf and Matilda fought against the King.

Sometime after April 1095, Welf and Matilda separated from each other. It is not clear whether Welf left Matilda, or vice versa. It is possible that Welf left Matilda after he found out that she had willed her lands to the papacy and he could not expect to inherit them. Together with his father, he changed sides to that of King Henry IV, possibly in exchange for a promise of succeeding his father as duke of Bavaria.

After his father's death in 1101, Welf inherited the office of duke of Bavaria. He continued his alliance with the kings of Germany. Although separated from Matilda, he remained married to her until her death in 1115. He did not remarry and died childless in 1120. He was succeeded as duke of Bavaria by his younger brother, Henry IX. Welf was buried at Weingarten Abbey.

== Sources ==
- L.L. Ghirardini, Storia critica di Matilde di Canossa (Modena, 1989).
- E. Goez, 'Welf V. und Mathilde von Canossa,' in Welf IV. Schlüsselfigur einer Wendezeit: regionale und europäische Perspektiven, Bauer D. and Becher M. (eds.), Munich, 2004, pp. 360–387.
- Hay, David (2008). The military leadership of Matilda of Canossa, 1046-1115. Manchester University Press.
- A. Overmann, Gräfin Mathilde von Tuscien: Ihre Besitzungen. Geschichte ihres Gutes von 1115-1230 und ihre Regesten (1895).
- Luscombe, David; Riley-Smith, Jonathan, eds. (2006). The New Cambridge Medieval History. Cambridge University Press.
- I.S. Robinson, Henry IV of Germany, 1056-1106 (Cambridge, 2003).

Welf II of Bavaria House of Welf Born: 1072 Died: 1120
Regnal titles
Preceded by Welf I	Duke of Bavaria; 1101–1120	Succeeded by Henry IX
