= Kunigunde of Altdorf =

German noble (c. 1020 – 1054)

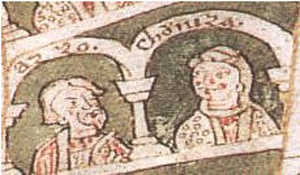
- Margrave Alberto Azzo II with his first wife Kunigunde of Altdorf
- Born: c. 1020
- Died: 31 August 1054
- Noble family: Elder Welf
- Spouse: Albert Azzo II d'Este
- Issue: Welf I, Duke of Bavaria
- Father: Welf II of Altdorf
- Mother: Imiza of Luxembourg

Kunigunde of Altdorf (also known as Cunegonde or Chuniza; c. 1020 – 31 August 1054) was a member of the Swabian line of the Elder House of Welf. She was also the ancestress of the younger House of Guelph, a cadet branch of the House of Este.

== Life ==
Kunigunde was the only daughter of Welf II, Count of Altdorf, and Imiza of Luxembourg. She was named after her mother’s aunt Cunigunde, who was married to Emperor Henry II. Her brother was Welf III (died 1055), the last member of the Elder House of Welf.

Kunigunde married c. 1035 to Albert Azzo II, Margrave of Milan, Luni, and Tortona. He was the only son of Albert Azzo I and his wife Adelaide. Kunigunde's dowry included the estate of Elisina (modern Solesino) which had formed part of her mother, Imiza’s dowry.

Kunigunde and Albert Azzo had one son:

- Welf IV (between 1035 and 1040 – 9 November 1101 in Paphos). He was named after his uncle, Welf III, whose property he later inherited. In 1070, Welf IV also succeeded to the duchy of Bavaria, which had once been ruled by his great-great-uncle Henry V, Duke of Bavaria.
