= Weingarten Abbey =

Monastery in Weingarten, Germany

Coordinates: 47°48′33″N 9°38′41″E

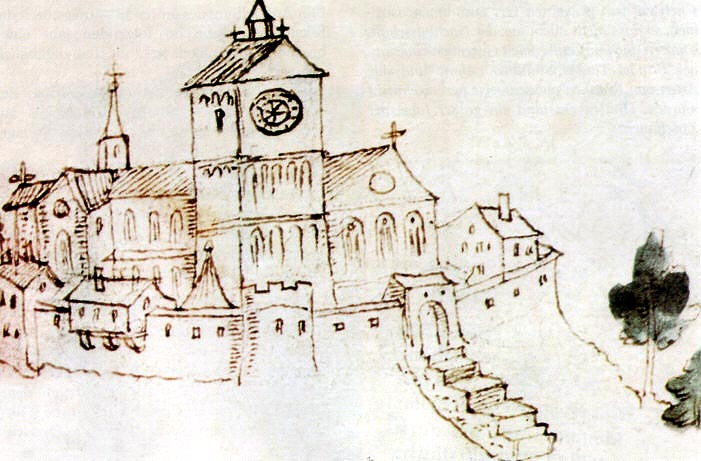
- Weingarten Abbey, 1525
- Interactive map of Weingarten Abbey

Monastery information
- Order: Benedictine

Site
- Location: Weingarten

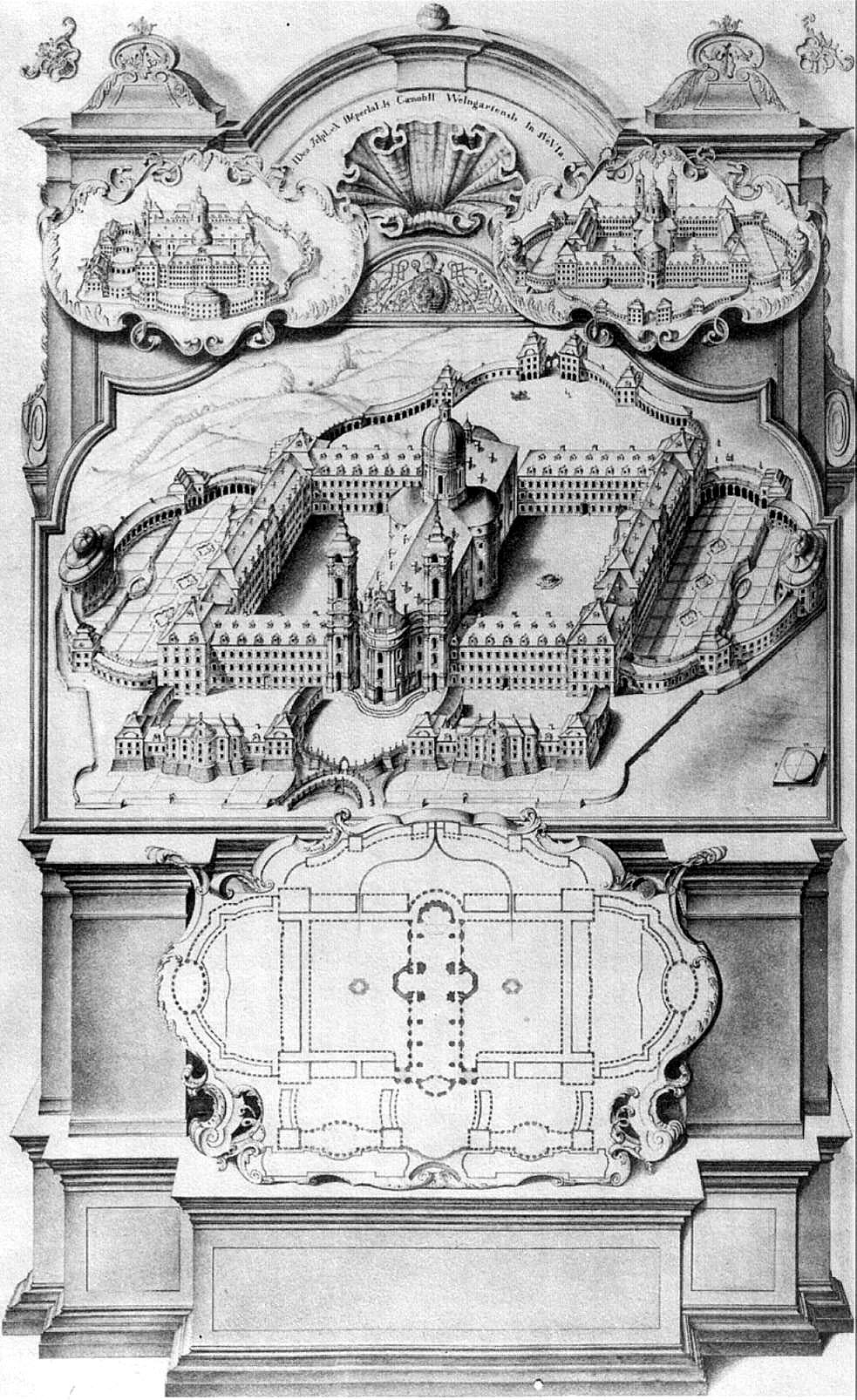
Ideal plan of Weingarten Abbey, 1723

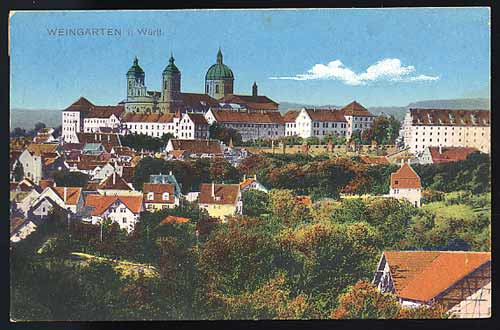
Weingarten, showing the abbey buildings on the Martinsberg, 1917

Weingarten Abbey or St. Martin's Abbey (German: Reichsabtei Weingarten until 1803, then merely Abtei Weingarten) is a Benedictine monastery on the Martinsberg (St. Martin's Mount) in Weingarten near Ravensburg in Baden-Württemberg (Germany).

== First foundation ==
Originally founded as a nunnery at Altdorf shortly around 900, the nuns were replaced by canons, but again returned in 1036. Welf I, Duke of Bavaria exchanged the nuns for the Benedictine monks of Altomünster Abbey in 1047. The monastery being destroyed by fire in 1053, Welf ceded his castle on the neighbouring hill to the monks, and thenceforth the monastery became known as Weingarten ("vineyard"), which is documented from about 1123. (In 1865, the village took the name of the monastery to become the present town of Weingarten). In 1126, Henry IX, Duke of Bavaria, withdrew here after his abdication; he died the same year and was buried in the abbey church.

Upon her death in 1095, Judith of Flanders bequeathed to the abbey her library, containing a number of illustrated manuscripts. The monks worked, among other things, at manuscript illumination. Their most famous work is the Berthold Sacramentary of 1217, now in the Pierpont Morgan Library in New York City. Also of especial note is the Welfenchronik, written and illustrated in about 1190, chronicling and glorifying the House of Welf which had its seat at Ravensburg nearby.

The monastery was elevated to the status of a Reichsabtei, independent of all territorial lordship except that of the emperor, in 1274.

It acquired territory of 306 km^{2} (118 sq mi), stretching from the Allgäu to the Bodensee and including many forests and vineyards, and was one of the richest monasteries in southern Germany. Its discipline never seriously declined, except during the latter part of the fifteenth, and the early part of the sixteenth century, owing chiefly to the encroachments of a few commendatory abbots and the oppression of the bailiffs. Immediately before its suppression in 1802 it comprised forty-eight monks, ten of whom resided at the dependent priory of Hofen.

In 1803, during the German Mediatisation, the abbey was dissolved. At first, it became part of the Principality of Nassau-Orange-Fulda, and then in 1806 part of the Kingdom of Württemberg. The buildings were used inter alia as a factory and as a barracks for a regiment of infantry; the abbey church as the parish church of the town of Weingarten.

King George V of Hanover visited the burial place of his ancestors (see below, Other burials) in 1852 and then had the dilapidated crypt under the church redesigned in a classical style by Leo von Klenze. The bones of nine members of the House of Welf, from which the English royal family also descends, are buried here in a single sarcophagus made of granite marble.

== Second foundation ==
In 1922, Weingarten was re-founded and re-settled by Benedictines from Beuron Archabbey and from the English Abbey of Erdington (in a suburb of Birmingham) which had itself been settled from Beuron. In 1940, the monks were expelled by the National Socialists, but were able to return after the end of the war.

The monks are responsible for the management of the "Blutritt", or pilgrimage to the Reliquary of the Holy Blood in the abbey church; they also run a guesthouse.

Weingarten belongs to the Beuronese Congregation of the Benedictine Confederation. It is a monastery of two ecclesiastical traditions or rites — one part of the monks follow the Roman Rite, the other part the Byzantine.

In 2009 only four monks remained in Weingarten. The abbey was vacated on October 16, 2010; the Catholic Diocese of Rottenburg-Stuttgart stepped in as a new tenant and tried to find a new monastic community to install here.

In 2014, the Diocese offered the rooms to the State of Baden-Württemberg as a refugees home. Due to dilapidated sanitary installations and issues of monument protection this was declined at first; instead parts of the rooms used by the Academy of the Diocese of Rottenburg-Stuttgart (see below) were rededicated as refugees home. In 2015, the number of refugees rose steeply. In July and August 2015 a part of the former abbey rooms was cut off and prepared to serve as additional Bedarfsorientierte Erstaufnahmeeinrichtung (BEA) (auxiliary first admittance/initial reception facility for refugees). At end of October 2015 about 130 refugees were accommodated there and about 40 at the refugee home in the rooms of the Academy.

== Buildings ==
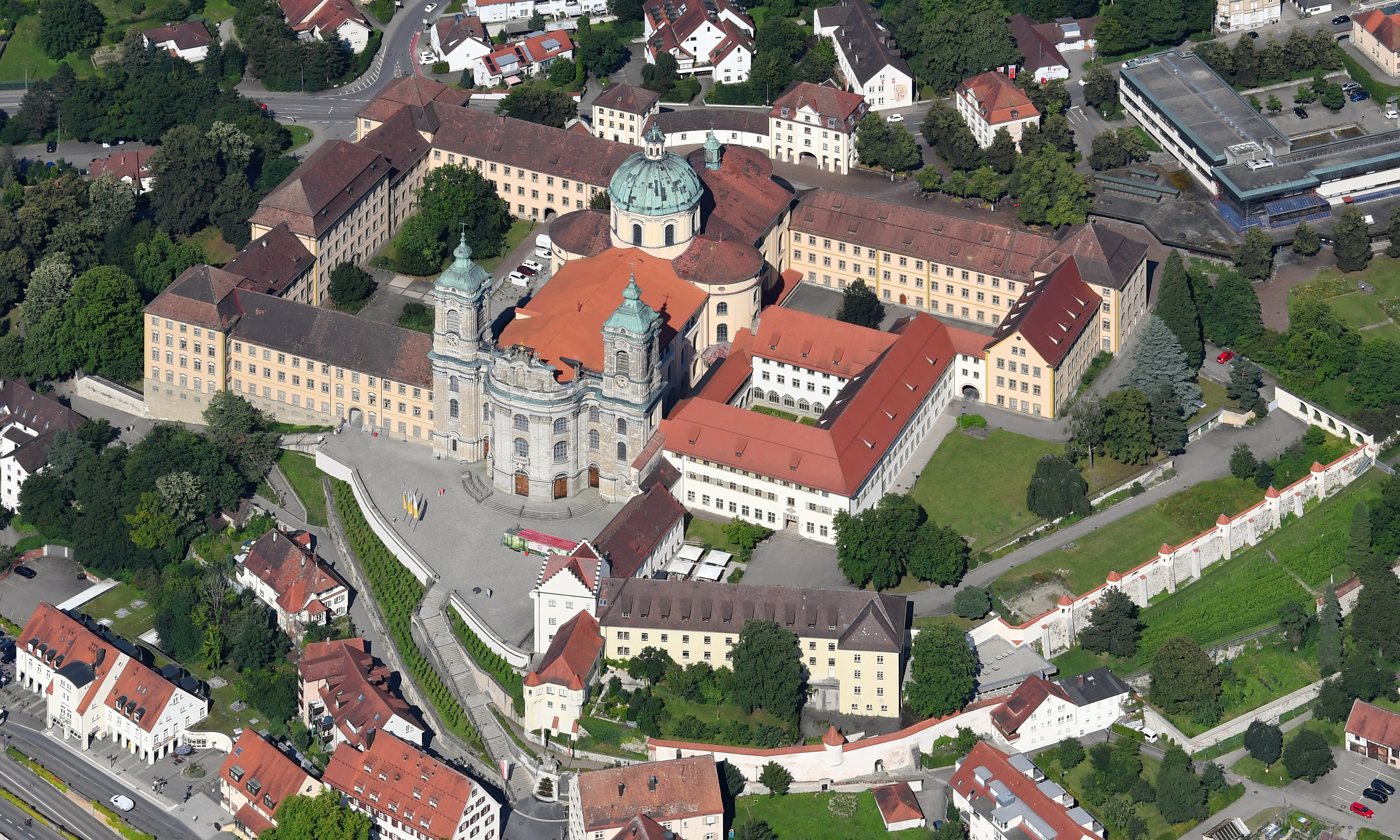
Aerial view of Weingarten Abbey

The abbey and the St. Martin's Basilica are a major attraction on the tourist route known as the Oberschwäbische Barockstrasse (Upper Swabian Baroque Route).

In 1715, the Romanesque abbey church, constructed between 1124 and 1182, was largely demolished, and replaced between 1715 and 1724 by a large and richly decorated Baroque church designed in the Italian-German Baroque style by Franz Beer. The frecoes are by Cosmas Damian Asam. The church is the second largest church in Württemberg. and is the largest Baroque church in Germany. The 102 meter long church is known as the "Swabian St. Peter's" since this church is almost exactly one-half the size of St. Peter's Basilica in Rome.

The church was intended to stand within a monastic site built to the ideal layout, but this undertaking was only partially completed as the north wing would have blocked the via regia or imperial road. Following the order on April 27, 1728 to stop construction on the north wing, the southern wing was extended and the east wing was completed. In 1956 the church was declared a papal basilica minor.

Within the church is the famous Gabler Organ, a church organ that was built between 1735 and 1750 by Joseph Gabler. The organ has over 60 registers, 169 ranks, 63 voices and over 6600 pipes.

A wing of the abbey precincts accommodates the present monastery. Other parts of the former abbey house the Pädagogische Hochschule Weingarten and the Academy of the Diocese of Rottenburg-Stuttgart.

== Relic of the Holy Blood of Jesus ==
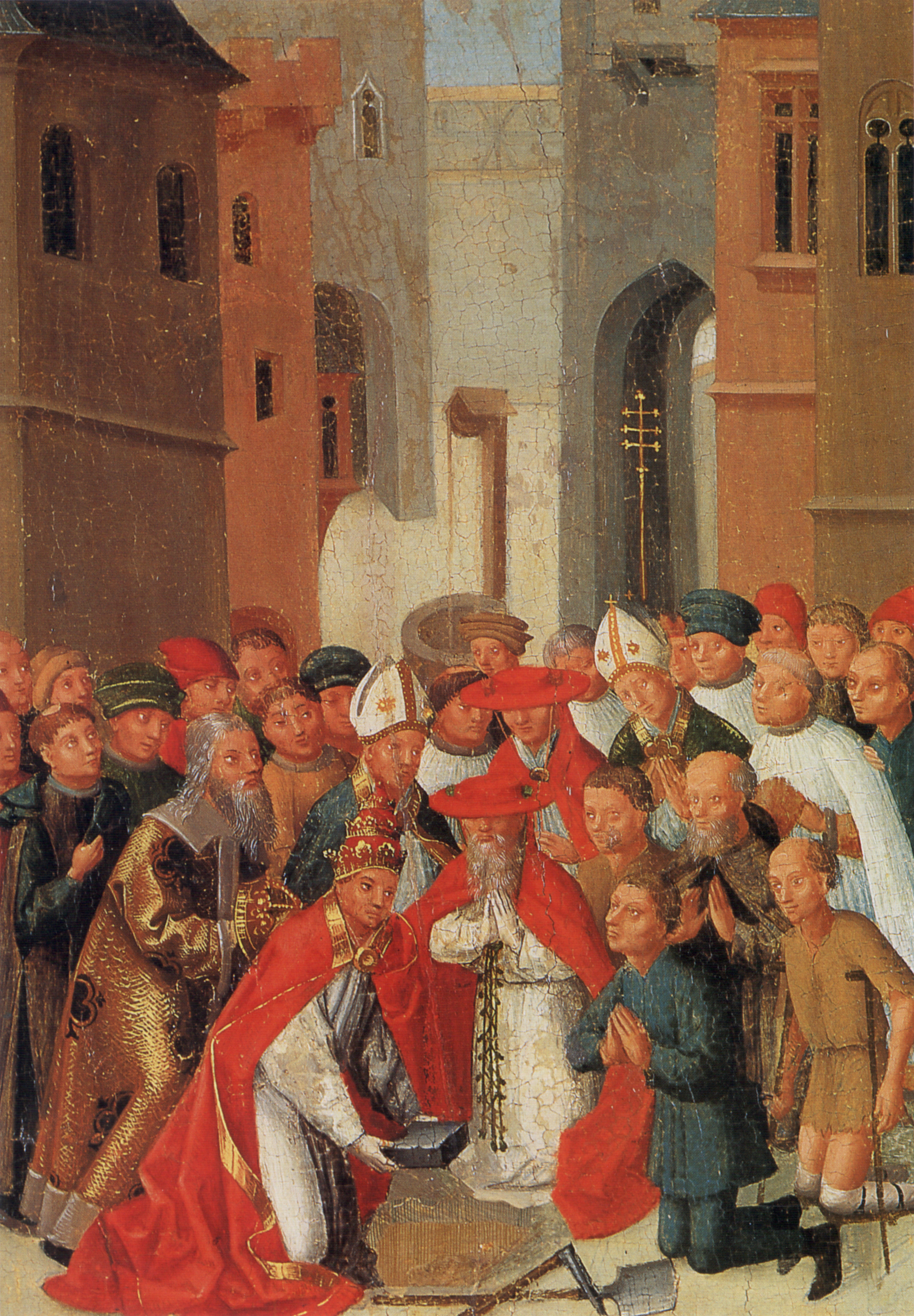
Depiction of the hidden relic being discovered (the figure kneeling on the right is Adilbero, now seeing), 1489

The greatest treasure of Weingarten was its famous relic of the Precious Blood, still preserved in the church of Weingarten. Its legend runs thus: Longinus, the soldier who opened Jesus's side with a lance, caught some of the Sacred Blood and preserved it in a leaden box, which later he buried at Mantua. Being miraculously discovered in 804, the relic was solemnly exalted by Pope Leo III, but again buried during the Hungarian and Norman invasions. In 1048 it was re-discovered and solemnly exalted by Pope Leo IX in the presence of the emperor, Henry III, and many other dignitaries. It was divided into three parts, one of which the pope took to Rome, another was given to the emperor, Henry III, and the third remained at Mantua. Henry III bequeathed his share of the relic to Baldwin V, Count of Flanders, who gave it to his daughter Juditha. After her marriage to Welf I, Duke of Bavaria, Juditha presented the relic to Weingarten. The solemn presentation took place in 1090, on the Friday after the feast of the Ascension, and it was stipulated that annually on the same day, which came to be known as Blutfreitag, the relic should be carried in solemn procession. Numerous scholars have detailed the various chronological and political problems with this narrative, which was fabricated in order to imbue the relic with cultural grandeur and legitimacy.

The procession was prohibited in 1812, but since 1849 it has again taken place every year. It is popularly known as the Blutritt. The relic is carried by a rider, der heilige Blutritter, on horseback, followed by many other riders, and many thousands of people on foot. The reliquary, formerly of solid gold, set with numerous jewels, and valued at about 70,000 florins, was confiscated by the Government at the suppression of the monastery and replaced by a gilded copper imitation.

== Abbots of Weingarten ==
- Alto c. 750-ca. 770 (in Altomünster)
- Marinus
- Etto c. 780
- Gelzo 780-792
- ...
- Rudolf c. 1000-1025
- Eberhard c. 1025-c. 1040
- Heinrich I 1040-c. 1070 (move to Weingarten 1055)
- Beringer c. 1070-c. 1080
- Adilhelm of Luxemburg c. 1080-c. 1088
- Walicho c. 1088-c. 1108
- Kuno Truchseß of Waldburg-Thann c. 1109-1132
- Arnold c. 1133-c. 1140
- Gerhard Truchseß of Waldburg-Thann c. 1141-c. 1149
- Burkhard c. 1149-c. 1160
- Dietmar of Matsch c. 1160-c. 1180
- Marquard of Triberg c. 1180-c. 1181
- Werner of Markdorff c. 1181-c. 1188
- Saint Meingoz of Lechsgemünd c. 1188-1200
- Berthold of Heimburg 1200-1232
- Hugh de Montfort 1232-1242
- Konrad I of Wagenbach 1242-1265
- Hermann of Biechtenweiler 1265-1299
- Friedrich Heller von Hellerstein 1300-1315
- Konrad II von Ibach 1315-1336
- Konrad III von Überlingen 1336-1346
- Heinrich II von Ibach 1346-1363
- Ludwig von Ibach-Heldenberg 1363-1393
- Johann I von Essendorf 1393-1418
- Johann II Blaarer von Guttingen und Wartensee 1418-1437
- Erhard von Freybank 1437-1455 (d. 1462)
- Jobst Penthelin von Ravensburg 1455-1477
- Kaspar Schieck 1477-1491
- Hartmann von Knorringen-Burgau 1491-1520
- Gerwig Blarer von Görsperg 1520-1567
- Johann III Halblizel 1567-1575
- Johann Christoph Rastner von Zellersberg 1575-1586 (d. 1590)
- Georg Wegelin 1586-1627
- Franz Dietrich 1627-1637
- Domenicus I Laumann von Liebenau 1637-1673
- Alfons von Stadelmayer 1673-1683
- Willibald Kobold 1683-1697
- Sebastian Hyller 1697-1730
- Alfons II Jobst 1730-1738
- Placidus Renz 1738-1745 (d. 1748)
- Domenicus II Schnitzer 1746-1784
- Anselm Ritter 1784-1803

New foundation:

- Ansgar Höckelmann 1922–1929, † 1943
- Michael von Witkowski 1929–1933, † 1945
- Conrad Winter 1933–1953, † 1957
- Wilfrid Fenker 1953–1975, † 1975
- Dr. Adalbert Metzinger 1975–1982, † 1984
- Dr. Lukas Weichenrieder 1982-2004
  - Archabbot Theodor Hogg of Beuron, Abbot-Administrator 2004-2007
  - P. Basilius Sandner, Prior-Administrator 2007-2009
  - Abbot President Dr. Albert Schmidt, Abbot-Administrator 2009–2010

== Other burials ==
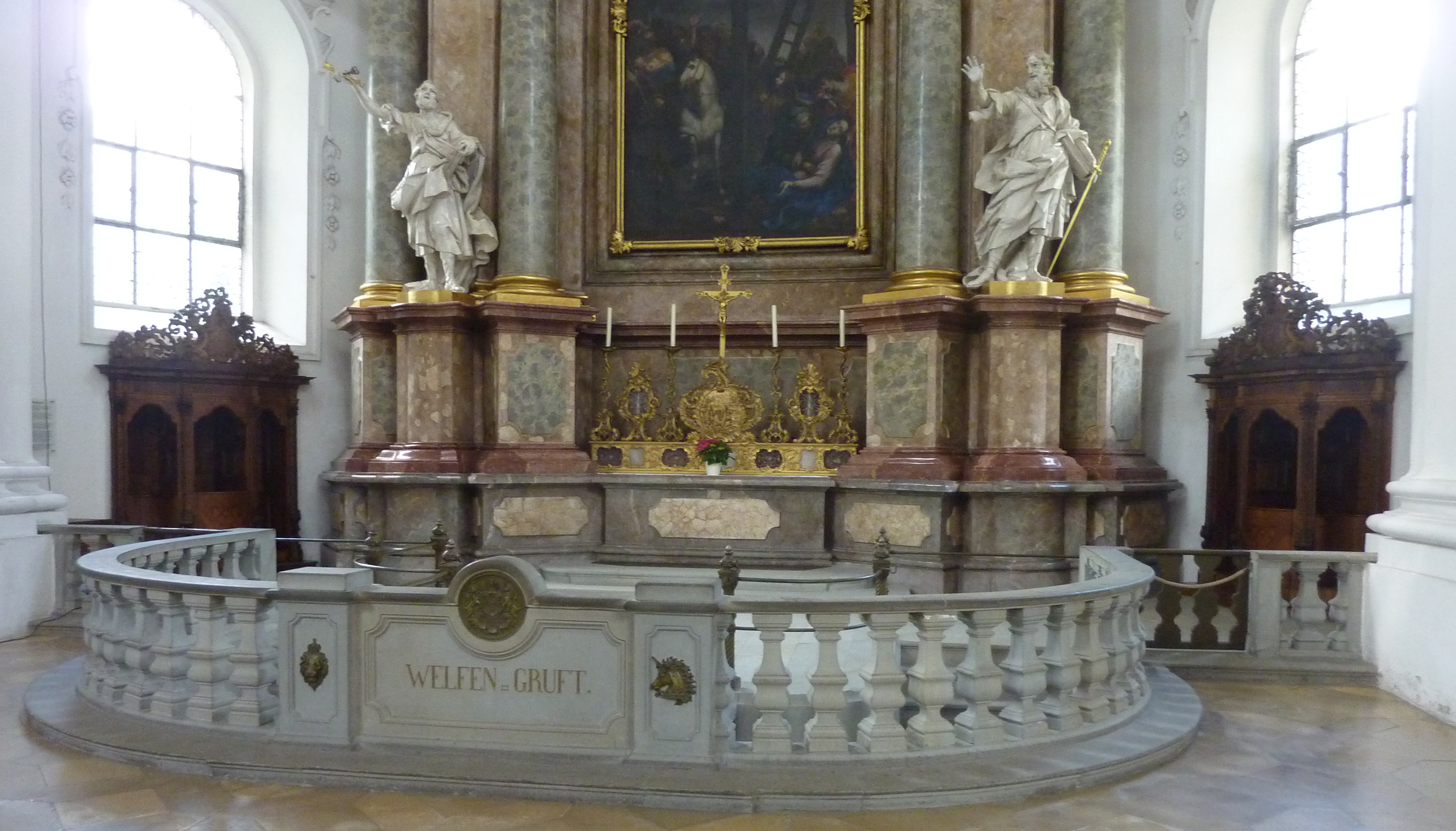
Entrance to the Guelph crypt

- Welf II, Count of Swabia (d. 1030) and his brother Henry, count of Altdorf (d. c.1000)
- Welf III, Duke of Carinthia (d. 1055)
- Welf I, Duke of Bavaria (d. 1101) and Judith of Flanders, Countess of Northumbria (d. 1095)
- Welf II, Duke of Bavaria (d. 1120)
- Henry IX, Duke of Bavaria (d. 1126), his wife Wulfhilde of Saxony (d. 1126) and their daughter Sophia, margravine of Styria (d. 1145)

== See also ==
- 18th-century Western domes

== Notes ==
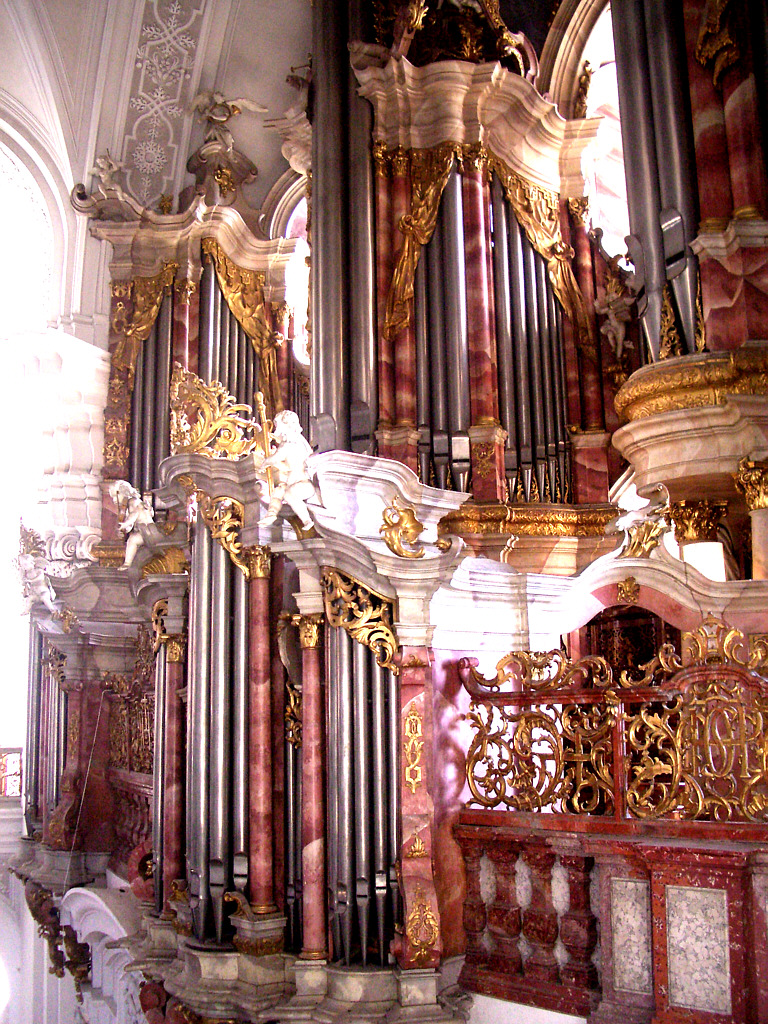
Organ of St. Martin's Basilica
