= Welf II of Swabia =

Welf II
- Count of Altdorf
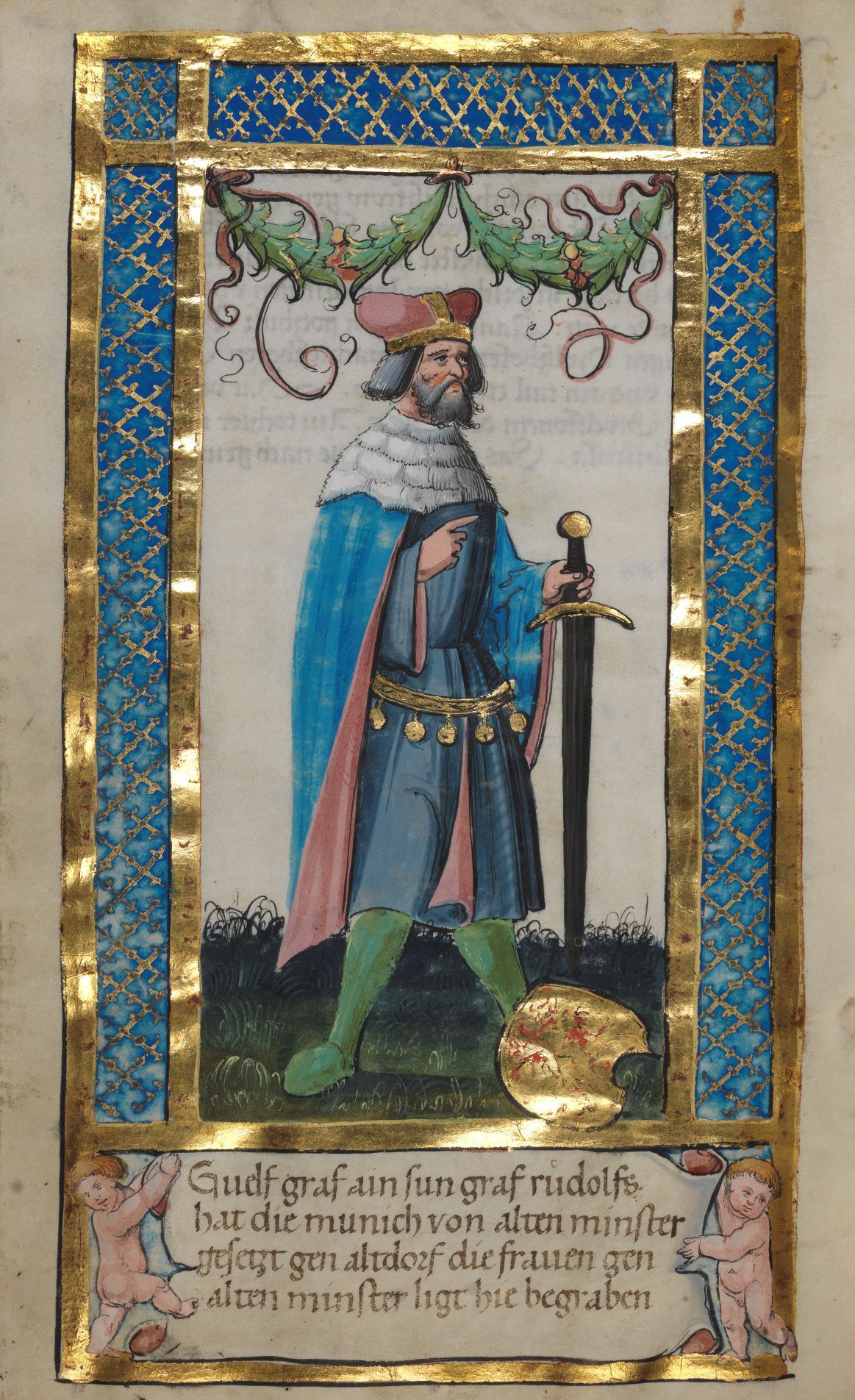
- Count Welf II in the Weingarten Stifterbüchlein, c. 1510
- Died: 10 March 1030; Bodman Castle
- Buried: Weingarten Abbey
- Noble family: Elder House of Welf
- Spouse: Imiza of Luxembourg
- Issue: Welf, Duke of Carinthia; Kunigunde of Altdorf
- Father: Rudolf II, Count of Altdorf
- Mother: Ita of Öhningen

Welf II (c. 960/70 – 10 March 1030) was a Swabian count and a member of the Elder House of Welf.

== Life ==
He was a younger son of Count Rudolf II and Ita, a daughter of Duke Conrad I of Swabia of the Conradine dynasty. He constructed a castle at Ravensburg.

In the 1020s, Welf feuded with the Augsburg and Freising bishops. He pillaged the treasury of Bishop Bruno of Augsburg, brother of Emperor Henry II, and sacked the city of Augsburg.

Welf opposed the election of the Salian count Conrad II as King of the Romans in 1024 because it did not suit his interests, but he had to eventually relent. The next year he joined a rebellion launched by the Babenberg duke Ernest II of Swabia, but finally submitted in 1027. He died, probably in captivity, in 1030. He was buried at Weingarten Abbey.

== Marriage and issue ==
Welf II was married to Imiza, daughter of Count Frederick of Luxembourg. With Imiza, Welf had at least two children:

- Welf, Duke of Carinthia (Welf III; d. 1055)
- Kunigunde of Altdorf (also called Chuniza; c. 1020 – 31 August 1054)

== Sources ==
- Freed, John B. (2016). Frederick Barbarossa: The Prince and the Myth. Yale University Press.
- Dick, Madelyn Bergen (2001). "Welfs". In Jeep, John M. (ed.). Routledge Revivals: Medieval Germany (2001): An Encyclopedia. Routledge.
- F-R. Erkens, Konrad II. Herrschaft und Reich des ersten Salierkaisers (Regensburg 1998).
- Reuter, Timothy. Germany in the Early Middle Ages 800–1056. New York: Longman, 1991.
- B. Schneidmüller: Die Welfen. Herrschaft und Erinnerung (819–1252). (Stuttgart, 2000), pp. 119–123.
- A. Thiele, Erzählende genealogische Stammtafeln zur europäischen Geschichte Band I, Teilband 1 (Frankfurt/Main 1993).
- T. Zotz, 'Welf II.,' in: Lexikon des Mittelalters (LexMA), Volume 8 (Munich, 1997), cols. 2143–2144.
