= Welf I of Bavaria =

Duke of Bavaria

Welf I
- Duke of Bavaria
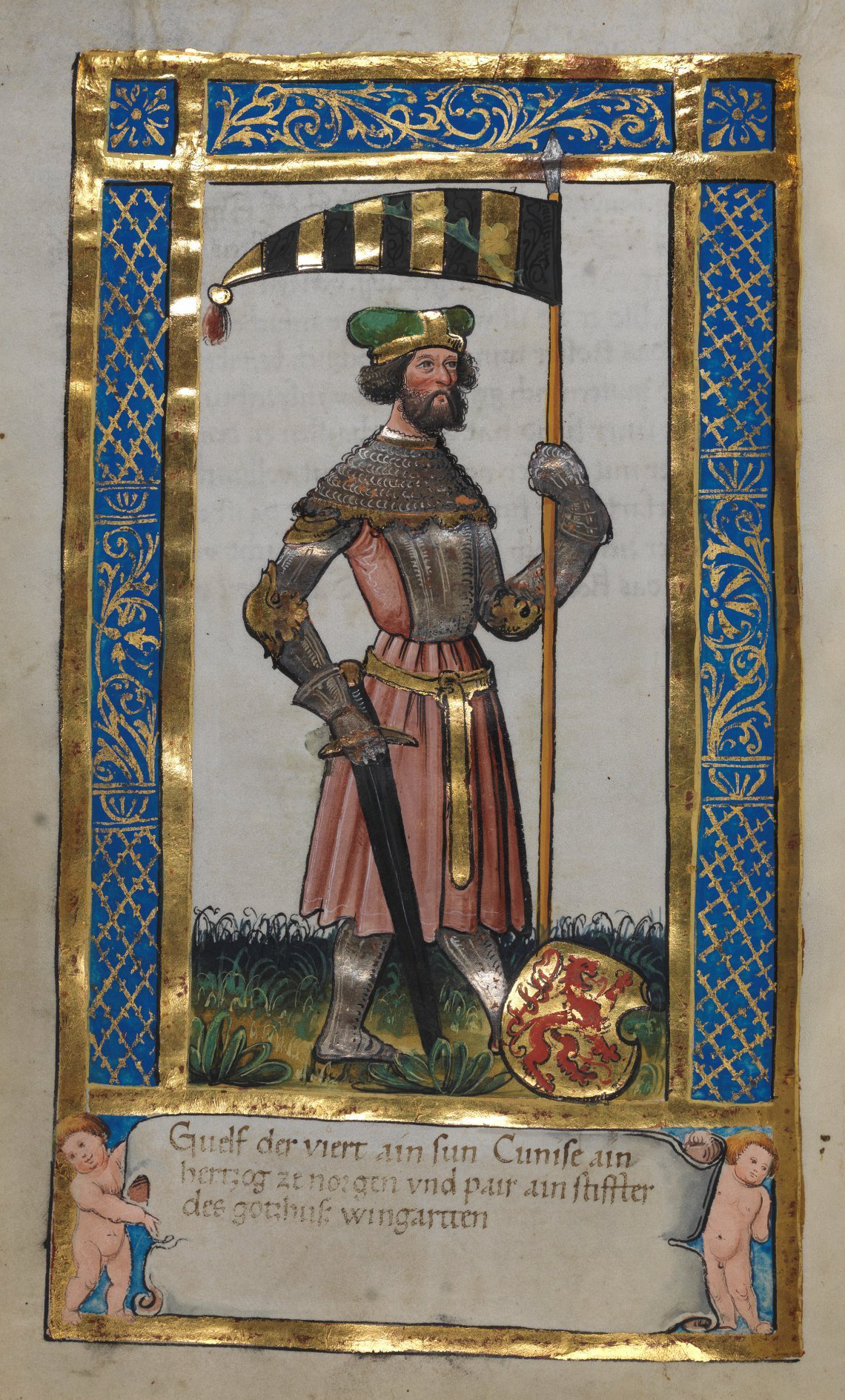
- Welf IV, idealized portrait in the Weingarten Founder's Book, circa 1500 (Württemberg State Library, Cod. hist. Q 584, fol. 25v)
- Born: c. 1035/1040; Unknown, perhaps Solesino
- Died: 6 November 1101; Paphos, Cyprus, Byzantine Empire
- Noble family: Welf (founder)
- Spouses: Ethelinde of Northeim; Judith of Flanders
- Issue: Welf II/V the Fat; Henry IX the Black; Kunizza
- Father: Albert Azzo II, Margrave of Milan
- Mother: Kunigunde of Altdorf

Welf I (c. 1035/1040 – 6 November 1101) was Duke of Bavaria from 1070 to 1077 and again from 1096 until his death. He was the first member of the House of Welf branch of the House of Este. In the genealogy of the Elder House of Welf, he is counted as Welf IV or simply Guelf.

== Biography ==
Welf was the son of Albert Azzo II, Margrave of Milan, and Kunigunde of Altdorf. When Welf's maternal uncle, Welf, Duke of Carinthia (also known as Welf III) died childless in 1055, Welf inherited his property. In 1062, Welf married Ethelinde of Northeim, daughter of Otto, Duke of Bavaria. Although Azzo II of Este continued firm in the interests of Pope Gregory VII, Welf's marriage, and his inheritance of property in Germany, meant that he was more concerned with German affairs and he supported Emperor Henry IV.

When his father-in-law, Duke Otto, had become an enemy of Emperor Henry IV and forfeited his duchy, Welf remained loyal to Henry IV. In compliance with Henry's commands, he repudiated and divorced his wife, Ethelinde, and soon thereafter (in 1070) he was rewarded for his fidelity by being appointed Duke of Bavaria in Otto's stead. This event took place at Goslar in 1070, when the Duchy of Bavaria submitted quietly to the newly made duke, who was the representative of one of the most ancient families in the province. His repudiation of Ethelinde, which could have been considered an act of injustice, does not seem to have been held against him.

However, during the Investiture Controversy, Welf changed sides turning against the Emperor, supporting Pope Gregory VII as well as lending his support for the election of Rudolf of Rheinfelden in March 1077. Pope and Emperor were superficially reconciled in 1076, but the following year saw them again engaged in active hostilities. Henry, in consequence of these repeated acts of rebellion, declared Welf deposed in his newly acquired duchy. However, supported by his faithful Bavarians and aided by his father in Italy, Welf was able to maintain his place, and openly defy the ban of the Empire in May 1077. Welf joined the discontented princes who supported the standard of Rudolph, at a time when any who refused to follow the pope's direction could expect to be excommunicated by the church—a potent and effective threat in the social and political conditions of the time. However, Gregory died in 1085 and his successors took a less intensive part in the affairs of Germany. Welf, though still adhering to the party of the church, began to relax in his exertions to support Rudolf of Rheinfelden.

After his divorce from his first wife in 1070, Welf married Judith of Flanders, daughter of Baldwin IV, Count of Flanders and widow of Tostig Godwinson, Earl of Northumbria. In 1089, Welf's son Welf married Matilda of Tuscany, thus strengthening relationships with the pope. However, after the younger Welf divorced Matilda in 1095, Welf made amends with Henry IV and was reconfirmed in his position as Duke of Bavaria. After the death of his father Azzo in 1097, Welf tried to acquire his father's property south of the Alps, but did not succeed against his younger half-brother Fulco.

In 1099, Welf joined what would become known as the Crusade of 1101, along with William IX of Aquitaine, Hugh of Vermandois and Ida of Austria. His main success was to prevent a clash between fellow Crusaders, who had been pillaging Byzantine territory on their way to Constantinople and the Byzantine emperor's Pecheneg mercenaries.

The Crusade itself, entering Anatolia, ended disastrously. After passing Heraclea in September, Welf's Bavarians—like other crusader contingents—were ambushed and massacred by the Turkish troops of Kilij Arslan I, the Seljuq Sultan of Rûm. Welf himself escaped the fiasco, but died on his way back in Paphos, Cyprus, in 1101 and was buried in Weingarten Abbey. He was succeeded as Duke of Bavaria by his son Welf II.

== Children ==
Welf had the following children from his marriage with Judith of Flanders, daughter of Baldwin IV, Count of Flanders:

- Welf II, Duke of Bavaria, born 1072
- Henry IX, Duke of Bavaria (died 13 December 1126)
- Kunizza, died 6 March 1120, married Frederick Rocho, Count of Dießen

== See also ==
- Saxon revolt of 1077–1088

== Sources ==
- Dockray-Miller, Mary (2015). The Books and the Life of Judith of Flanders. Ashgate Publishing.
- Luscombe, David; Riley-Smith, Jonathan, eds. (2006). The New Cambridge Medieval History. Cambridge University Press.
- Robinson, I. S. (1999). Henry IV of Germany 1056-1106. Cambridge University Press.
- B. Schneidmüller, Die Welfen. Herrschaft und Erinnerung (Stuttgart, 2000).
- Creber, Alison (22 April 2019). "Breaking Up Is Hard To Do: Dissolving Royal and Noble Marriages in Eleventh-Century Germany". German History. 37 (2): 149–171. doi:10.1093/gerhis/ghy108. ISSN 0266-3554.

Welf I of Bavaria House of Welf Cadet branch of the House of Este Died: 1101
Regnal titles
Preceded by Otto II	Duke of Bavaria; 1070–1077	Succeeded by Henry VIII
Preceded by Henry VIII	Duke of Bavaria; 1096–1101	Succeeded by Welf II
