= Anne of Burgundy =

- Duchess of Bedford
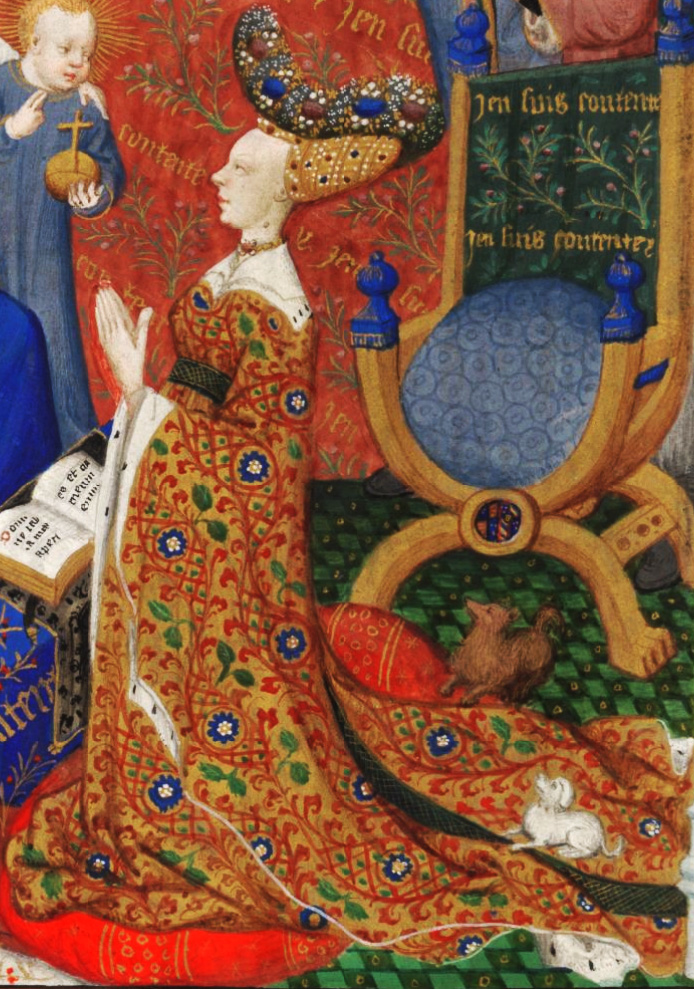
- Born: 30 September 1404
- Died: 13 November 1432 (aged 28); Hôtel de Bourgogne, Paris
- Burial: Church of the Celestines, Paris; Chartreuse de Champnol, Dijon
- Spouse: John of Lancaster, 1st Duke of Bedford (m. 1423)
- Father: John the Fearless
- Mother: Margaret of Bavaria

Anne of Burgundy, Duchess of Bedford (French: Anne de Bourgogne) (30 September 1404 – 13 November 1432) was a daughter of John the Fearless, Duke of Burgundy (1371–1419), and his wife Margaret of Bavaria (1363–1423).

== Duchess of Bedford ==
In June 1423 at Troyes, Anne married John of Lancaster, 1st Duke of Bedford, son of Henry IV of England, a marriage agreed by the terms of the 1423 Treaty of Amiens. The marriage was meant to cement relations between England and Anne's brother Philip the Good, Duke of Burgundy. This alliance was vital for continued English success in France as, in 1422, John had been appointed Regent of France, during the minority of his nephew, Henry VI of England, who was seven months old at the death of his father on 31 August 1422. Burgundy's antagonism towards the House of Valois (which caused the Armagnac–Burgundian Civil War) had been one of the leading factors in the losses faced by the French at the hands of the English. While John and Anne were happily married, their union remained childless.

Anne was present during the trial against Joan of Arc. She herself, or the women of her household on her behalf, examined the virginity of Joan of Arc and confirmed her to be a virgin. Anne was reportedly impressed by Joan of Arc, and gave orders that no men, guards, or men of high rank were to touch Joan during her imprisonment. Anne attended the execution of Joan of Arc in Rouen in 1431.

== Death and legacy ==
Anne died on 13 November 1432 in Paris, at the Hôtel de Bourbon, adjoining the Louvre Palace. She was buried at the couvent des Célestins, while her heart was deposited at the couvent des Grands-Augustins. Her tomb was designed by Guillaume Vluten and, according to one historian, "ranks among the most important Parisian effigies of the first half of the fifteenth century". Of the original funerary monument at the couvent des Célestins (which was destroyed in 1849), two pieces have survived: the gisant (recumbent statue), which is at the Louvre museum, and the pleurants (mourning statue), at the Musée de Cluny, the Middle Ages museum in Paris. Bones and other remains, found during archeological exploration of the couvent des Célestins in 1847, were identified as being those of Anne, thanks to a plaque bearing her name. In 1853, these remains were re-buried in the grave of her grandfather, Philip the Bold, in Saint Bégnine cathedral in Dijon.

Anne's death signified the beginning of one of two disastrous trends in Lancastrian history. The next year, John remarried to Jacquetta of Luxembourg. For various political reasons, this alienated Anne's brother, Duke Philip. Relations between John and Philip became cool, leading to the 1435 peace negotiations between Burgundy and Charles VII, the exiled king of France. Later that year, Philip formally broke the alliance with England.

== Ancestry ==
Ancestors of Anne of Burgundy

8. John II of France
4. Philip II, Duke of Burgundy
9. Bonne of Bohemia
2. John II, Duke of Burgundy
10. Louis II, Count of Flanders
5. Margaret III, Countess of Flanders
11. Margaret of Brabant
1. Anne of Burgundy
12. Louis IV, Holy Roman Emperor
6. Albert I, Duke of Bavaria
13. Margaret II, Countess of Hainault
3. Margaret of Bavaria
14. Louis I, Duke of Brzeg
7. Margaret of Brzeg
15. Agnes of Żagań

== Sources ==
- Chipps Smith, Jeffrey (1984). "The Tomb of Anne of Burgundy, Duchess of Bedford, in the Musée du Louvre". Gesta. 23 (1): 39–50. doi:10.2307/766962. JSTOR 766962. S2CID 157408009.
- Griffiths, R.A. (2005). The Reign of King Henry VI. The History Press. ISBN 0-7509-3777-7.
- Neillands, Robin (2001). The Hundred Years War. Routledge. ISBN 0-415-26131-7.
- Weir, Alison (1996). The Wars of the Roses: Lancaster and York. London: Ballantine Books. ISBN 0-345-40433-5.
