= Treaty of The Hague (1433) =

The Treaty of The Hague is a treaty signed on 12 April 1433, in which Jacqueline, Countess of Hainaut transferred the Dutch territories of her Bavaria-Straubing inheritance to Philip the Good, Duke of Burgundy. Jacqueline had fought over the counties of Holland, Zeeland, Hainaut and Friesland since the death of her father William VI of Holland in 1417 first against her uncle John and then against duke Philip. In 1428, defeated by Philip, she was forced to sign the Treaty of Delft, which named Philip as her heir if she died without offspring and forbade her to remarry without the consent of Philip. In 1432, after she married Frank van Borssele, Philip claimed that the Treaty of Delft had been broken and demanded that Jacqueline abandon all her rights to him; the treaty of The Hague of 1433 formalized this abandonment. Jacqueline died just three years later. Her Dutch lands were eventually merged into the Habsburg Empire.

== Sources ==
- Michaela Bleicher: Das Herzogtum Niederbayern-Straubing in den Hussitenkriegen. Kriegsalltag und Kriegsführung im Spiegel der Landschreiberrechnungen. Dissertation, Universität Regensburg 2006, p. 45 (online).
- Laetitia Boehm: Das Haus Wittelsbach in den Niederlanden. In: Zeitschrift für bayerische Landesgeschichte. Vol 44, 1981, p. 93–130, in particular 123–125 (online).
- Alfons Huber, Johannes Prammer (Hrsg.): 650 Jahre Herzogtum Niederbayern-Straubing-Holland. Vortragsreihe des Historischen Vereins für Straubing und Umgebung. Historischer Verein für Straubing und Umgebung, Straubing 2005, ISBN 3-00-014600-8, p. 331, 349.
- Joachim Wild: Holland. Die Wittelsbacher an der Nordsee (1346–1436). In: Alois Schmid, Katharina Weigand (Hrsg.): Bayern mitten in Europa. Vom Frühmittelalter bis ins 20. Jahrhundert. C. H. Beck, München 2005, ISBN 3-406-52898-8, p. 92–106, in particular 105.
