= Jacqueline, Countess of Hainaut =

Jacqueline
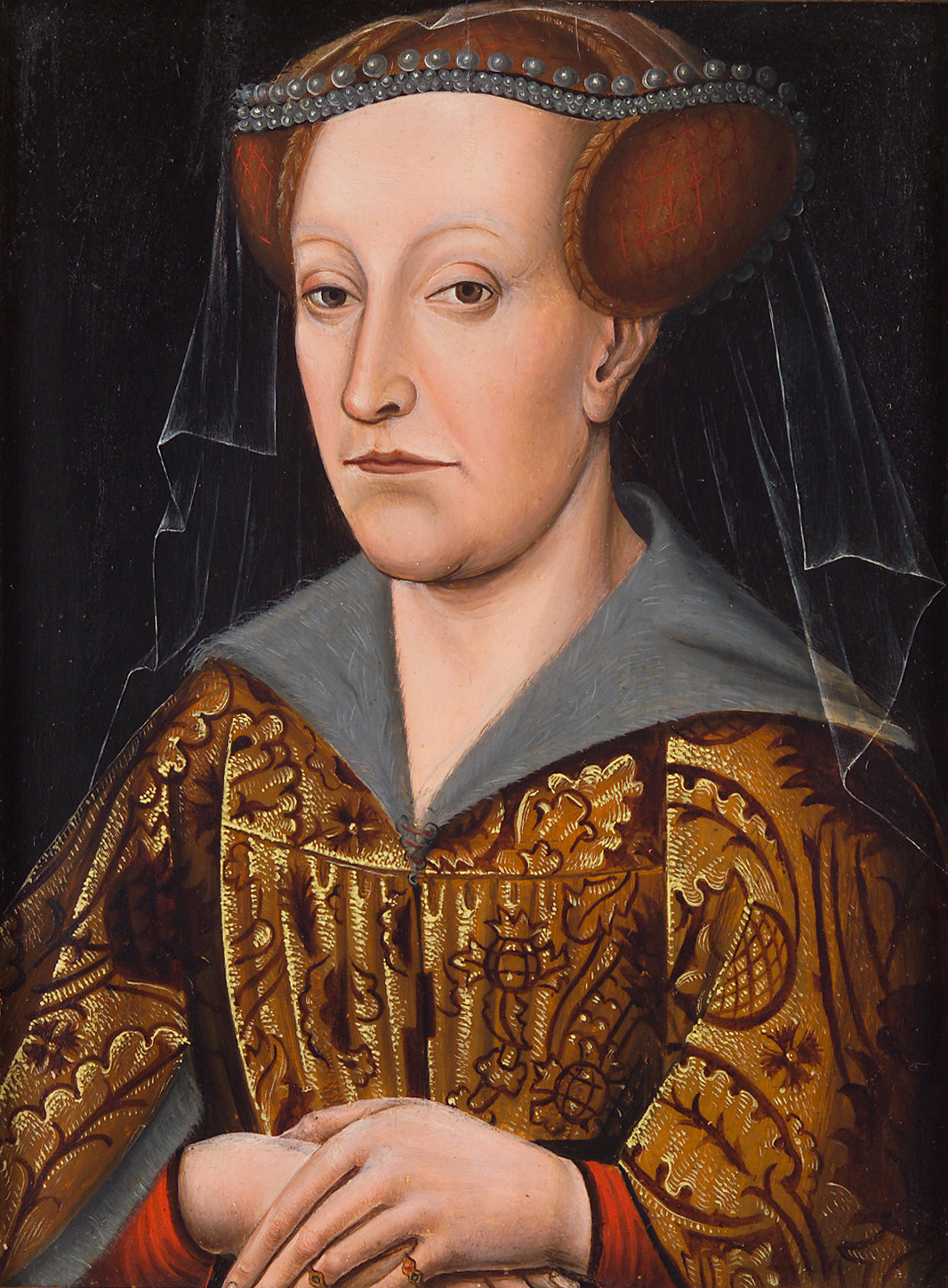
- Portrait of Jacqueline by Lambert van Eyck

Countess of Hainaut, Holland and Zeeland
- Reign: 30 May 1417 – 12 April 1433
- Predecessor: William IV and VI
- Successor: Philip the Good
- Born: 15 July 1401; Le Quesnoy, Nord, France
- Died: 8 October 1436 (aged 35); Voorhout, Teylingen, the Netherlands
- Burial: Binnenhof, The Hague
- Spouse: John, Dauphin of France (m. 1415; died 1417) John IV, Duke of Brabant (m. 1418; ann. 1422) Humphrey, Duke of Gloucester (m. 1423; ann. 1428) Frank van Borssele (m. 1434)
- House: Wittelsbach
- Father: William II, Duke of Bavaria
- Mother: Margaret of Burgundy

Jacqueline (Dutch: Jacoba; French: Jacqueline; German: Jakobäa; 15 July 1401 – 8 October 1436), of the House of Wittelsbach, was a noblewoman who ruled the counties of Holland, Zeeland and Hainaut in the Low Countries from 1417 to 1433. She was also Dauphine of France for a short time between 1415 and 1417 and Duchess of Gloucester in the 1420s, if her marriage to Humphrey, Duke of Gloucester, is accepted as valid.

Jacqueline was born in Le Quesnoy, and from her birth, she was referred to as "of Holland", indicating that she was the heiress of her father's estates.

Jacqueline was the last Wittelsbach ruler of Hainaut and Holland. Following her death, her estates passed into the inheritance of Philip the Good, Duke of Burgundy.

== Life ==
=== Early life and marriage to John, Duke of Touraine ===
She was the only daughter of William II, Duke of Bavaria (also known as William VI, Count of Holland) from his marriage with Margaret, a daughter of Philip the Bold, Duke of Burgundy and Margaret III, Countess of Flanders.

At the age of 22 months (in Paris on 5 May 1403) and again at the age of four (in Compiègne on 29 June 1406), Jacqueline was betrothed to John, Duke of Touraine, fourth son of King Charles VI of France and Queen Isabeau of Bavaria. Both children were brought up in the Castle of Le Quesnoy in Hainaut. The boy had been given into tutelage of his future father-in-law, since he was expected to succeed as ruler in Hainaut and not in any way in France itself. On 22 April 1411 the Pope gave his dispensation for the union and on 6 August 1415, when Jacqueline was fourteen, she and John married in The Hague. With this marriage, Duke William II wanted to secure the succession of his daughter to his domains; although he had at least nine illegitimate children, Jacqueline was his only legitimate offspring and as a female, her rights would be contested by her paternal uncle Bishop John of Liège and her cousin Philip the Good, Duke of Burgundy since 1419.

Four months after the wedding, on 15 December 1415, John's elder brother Louis, Dauphin of France, died; and thus John became the heir to the throne, with Jacqueline as the Dauphine and future Queen consort. Duke William II, who had raised John since childhood, as the father-in-law of the future King obtained a considerable influence at the French court; however, despite this he was less successful in his efforts with the German King Sigismund of Luxembourg to recognize Jacqueline as his rightful heir in the Counties of Holland, Zeeland and Hainaut. In March 1416, Count William raised the matter with Sigismund while the latter was the guest of the English king, Henry V of England, but was rejected; he angrily returned home.

Dauphin John died (probably poisoned) on 4 April 1417, leaving Jacqueline as a widow aged 16. Two months later on 31 May, she unexpectedly lost her father. Duke William II was bitten by a dog, which caused a blood infection that quickly killed him. The politically inexperienced Jacqueline now had to fight for her inheritance.

=== Marriage to John IV, Duke of Brabant and war with John III ===
In Hainaut, where female succession was long customary, Jacqueline was recognized as countess on 13 June, but in Holland and Zeeland her rights were controversial from the beginning. While the old aristocracy supported her, the municipal party supported her uncle John III, the youngest brother of her father and since 1389 the elected Bishop of Liège, although he was never fully ordained. Even before William II's death, he had expected to become his successor, and therefore he gave up his diocese. On the advice of her mother, Jacqueline initially gave her uncle the title of Guardian and Defender of the County of Hainaut (Hüters und Verteidigers des Landes Hennegau) in order to forestall his ambitions. However, the German King Sigismund, who had already been against Jacqueline's rights since 1416, formally enfeoffed John III with the counties of his deceased brother and married him to his niece Elisabeth of Görlitz, Duchess of Luxembourg and widow of Anthony, Duke of Brabant, who died in the Battle of Agincourt in 1415.

Jacqueline also remarried, but her selection of husband was unfortunate. John IV, Duke of Brabant, stepson of Elisabeth of Görlitz, who succeeded his father Anthony as Duke of Brabant, was chosen to be her second husband; modern historians believed that this decision was widely influenced by Jacqueline's mother and uncle John the Fearless, Duke of Burgundy. On 31 July 1417, two months after William II's death, the betrothal between Jacqueline and John IV took place, and the wedding was celebrated in The Hague on 10 March 1418. However, the union proved to be a failure. The close relationship between the spouses required a papal dispensation, which, although granted in December 1417, was revoked in January 1418 in the Council of Constance due to the intrigues of Jacqueline's opponents, including King Sigismund of Luxembourg. In addition to this, the considerable financial problems of the young Duke John IV and his weak political leadership increased the conflicts inside the marriage.

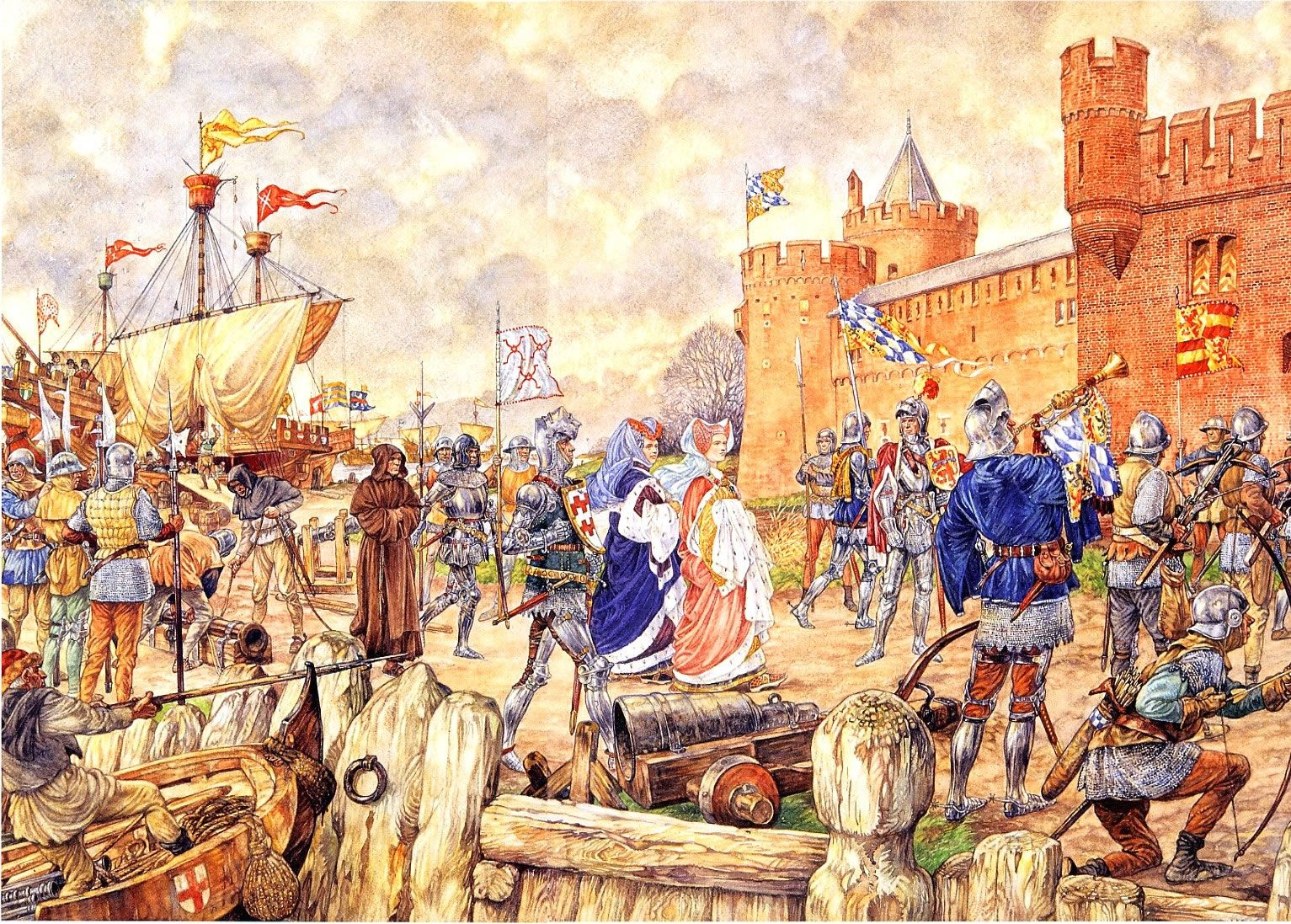
Jacqueline of Bavaria and Margaret of Burgundy before the walls of Gorinchem, 1417

John III, with the support of King Sigismund and the Cods, took up arms against Jacqueline, who was supported by the Hooks; this civil war was known as the Hook and Cod wars. The troops of uncle and niece met in the Battle of Gorkum in 1417; Jacqueline was victorious, but was forced to leave the major trading city of Dordrecht. In addition, her marital status was again questioned thanks to her uncle, who claimed that without papal dispensation the union was annulled; this caused even more misgivings for Jacqueline about how to maintain her marriage. Even worse, on 29 May 1418 and against the express wishes of King Sigismund, John IV pledged the district of Mons; because of this Jacqueline in 1419 signed the Compensation of Workum (Ausgleich von Workum) with her cousin Philip the Good, future Duke of Burgundy, under which for a monetary compensation she ceded to him the districts of Dordrecht, Gorkum and Rotterdam.

John III agreed to recognize the legitimacy of the marriage between Jacqueline and John IV of Brabant if only to receive a high financial compensation from the government for the next five years of the regions dominated by the spouses. However, the intervention of Pope Martin V finally ended the controversy with granting the papal dispensation on May 1419. John IV, always heavily indebted and against the will of his wife signed with John III the Treaty of St. Martinsdyk, under which he gave to Jacqueline's uncle full custody over Holland and Zeeland for the next 12 years. In exchange, John III gave a monetary compensation to the couple and left them the County of Hainaut; however, this was a little consolation for Jacqueline, whose subjects of Holland, Zeeland and Friesland were released from their oath of allegiance under the terms of the treaty. Finally, John IV also pledged Hainaut to improve his financial situation; for Jacqueline, this was enough: she and her allies began to want the formal separation from John IV.

=== Marriage to Humphrey, Duke of Gloucester and aftermath ===
In the meanwhile, the political situation had changed radically. The Duke of Burgundy, John the Fearless, was assassinated in September 1419, and the French Dauphin Charles, brother of Jacqueline's first husband, was considered an accomplice and was therefore disinherited in 1420 under the Treaty of Troyes. King Henry V of England then claimed to be the King of France. In February 1421 Jacqueline issued a statement where she stated that, because of the destructive behaviour of John IV of Brabant, she wanted the annulment of her marriage. The fight against John III, continued until the capture of the city of Leiden, the last city loyal to Jacqueline; after this, she had to admit defeat.

On 6 March 1421 Jacqueline fled to England asking the help of Henry V, who gave her a glamorous reception. She was an honoured guest at the court of England, and when the future Henry VI was born, Jacqueline was made one of his godparents. It was only after the unexpected death of Henry V in 1422 that Jacqueline obtained a dubious divorce from John IV of Brabant valid only in England that allowed her third marriage with Humphrey, Duke of Gloucester, Henry V's brother and principal counsellor of the Kingdom on behalf of his infant nephew Henry VI. However, as not all rules were observed, the marriage was arranged in haste and in secret in the town of Hadleigh, Essex, sometime between February and 7 March 1423.

The news of this marriage shocked everyone. On 15 October 1423 it was announced that not only was Jacqueline married to one of the most powerful princes of Europe, but that she was also rumoured to be pregnant with his child. On 20 October, she was granted a letter of denization, which would allow her and her descendants to be treated as English under law, and it recorded her status as duchess of Gloucester. To secure her position, Jacqueline had to obtain the formal annulment of her marriage with John IV of Brabant. She asked Pope Martin V in Rome and Antipope Benedict XIII in Avignon to resolve her irregular marital status, but her uncle John III intervened against it. Unexpectedly, her cousin Philip the Good, who wanted to prevent an English invasion, supported the annulment.

In the autumn of 1424 Jacqueline joined Humphrey in the Duchy of Gloucester, where she had a stillborn child; this was her only recorded pregnancy.

Jacqueline and Humphrey landed in Calais and by the end of November they entered Mons, where on 5 December the Duke of Gloucester was recognized as the sovereign Count of Hainaut. Already on 3 January 1425 he signed with

"Humphrey, by the grace of God, son, brother and uncle of kings, Duke of Gloucester, Count of Hainaut, Holland, Zealand and Pembroke, Lord of Friesland and Grand Chamberlain of England".

=== War in Holland ===
Her situation changed when her uncle John III of Bavaria died on 6 January 1425, the victim of poisoning. John IV, Duke of Brabant, still claimed rights over Holland, Zeeland and Hainault and made Philip, Duke of Burgundy, regent of Holland and Zeeland, like he had done before with John III. Jacqueline escaped her imprisonment in Ghent disguised in men's clothing and fled to Schoonhoven and then Gouda, where she stayed with the leaders of the Hook faction. Now it was her former husband, John of Brabant, who tried to dispute her inheritance. In this matter, Humphrey did intervene, albeit with limited force; his efforts, however, had disastrous consequences for the English-Burgundian alliance that aided the English cause in France during the Hundred Years' War. Pope Martin V decreed that Jacqueline was still the wife of John IV, Duke of Brabant, and therefore her marriage to Humphrey of Gloucester was illegitimate. However, John IV had died a year earlier.

=== Peace and loss of lands ===
On 3 July 1428 Jacqueline had to agree to a peace treaty, Reconciliation of Delft (de Zoen van Delft), with the duke of Burgundy. By this treaty, Jacqueline kept her titles of Countess of Holland, Zeeland and Hainaut, but the administration of her territories was placed in the hands of Philip, who was also appointed as her heir in case she died without children. She was not allowed to marry without the permission of her mother, Philip and the three counties. (Her marriage to Humphrey was annulled in this same year.) However, her financial situation was dire. She barely had enough income to support her household. Furthermore, the duke of Burgundy did not stop after the peace treaty in 1428. He bought the loyalty of her allies or estranged them from her in another way. At Easter 1433, Jacqueline "voluntarily" signed a treaty with Philip which gave Philip all her lands and titles. In return she was allowed the income of several estates, mostly situated in Zeeland.

=== Marriage with Frank van Borssele and death ===
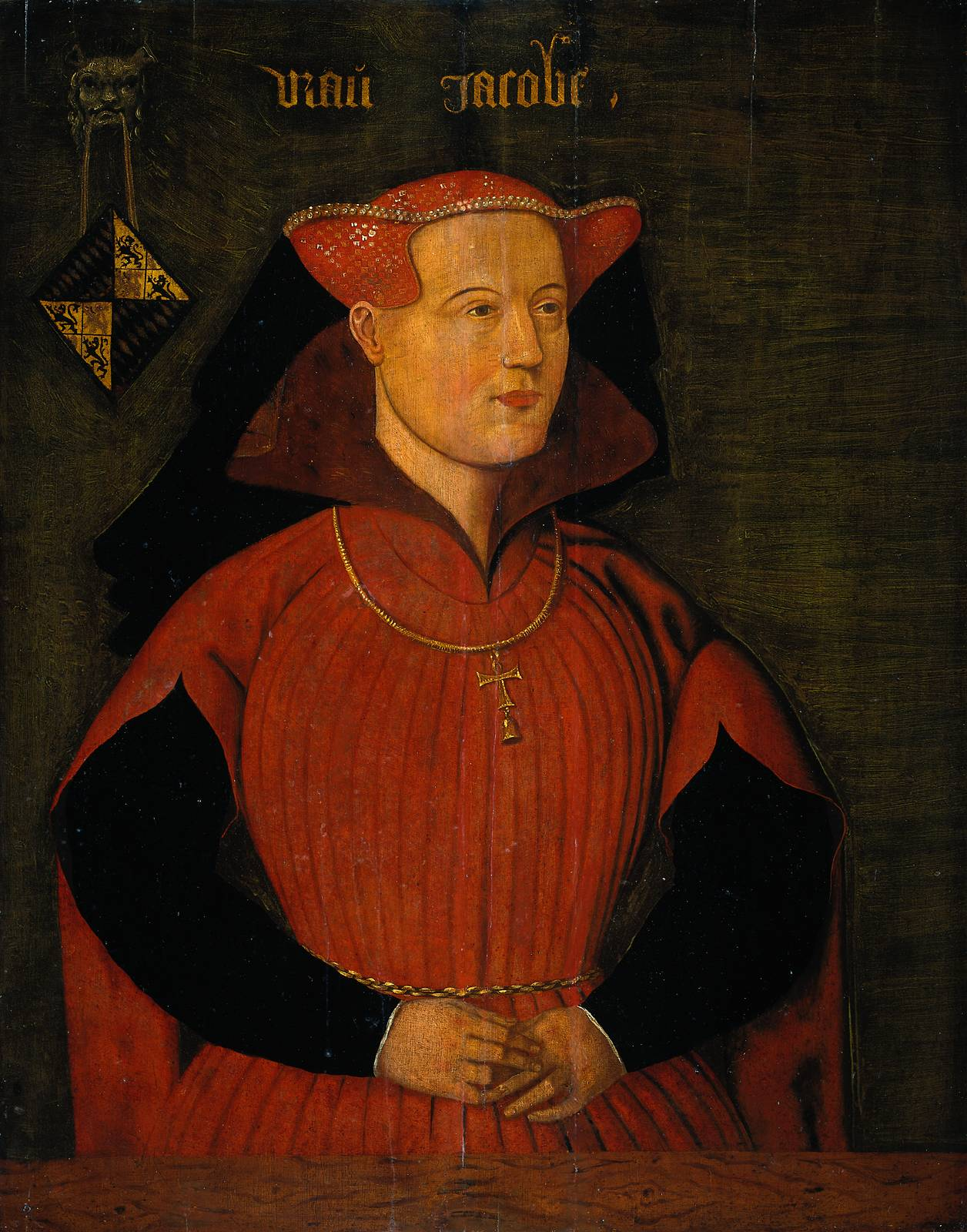
Jacqueline, Countess of Holland and Zeeland, ca. 1435.

With the renunciation of her titles, Jacqueline retired to her land in Zeeland. There, she and Francis, Lord of Borssele ("Frank van Borssele"), a local and powerful nobleman, became close. In the spring of 1434 they married and Philip granted Frank the title of Count of Oostervant. This marriage, contrary to the other three, was one out of love, at least for Jacqueline. It did not last long. In 1436 she became ill and after a few months of illness she died of tuberculosis in Teylingen Castle on 8 October 1436. Since she had no children, Philip of Burgundy inherited Hainaut and Holland. Her husband Frank survived her for thirty-four years.

== Legends ==
There are many legends surrounding the life of Jacqueline. The most prevalent one is her supposed secret marriage to Francis of Borssele in 1432, two years prior to their public and official wedding. This secret marriage was supposed to be the real reason why she had to give up her titles and give them to the duke of Burgundy as it would violate the regulations in the peace treaty of 1428. However, there is no evidence that such a secret marriage ever took place and contemporary sources only mention the rumours of an upcoming wedding between Jacqueline and Francis at the end of 1433, half a year after Jacqueline renounced her titles.

== Popular culture ==
She is the central protagonist of the 1831 novel Jacqueline of Holland by the Irish writer Thomas Colley Grattan.

== Ancestry ==
Ancestors of Jacqueline, Countess of Hainaut

8. Louis IV, Holy Roman Emperor
4. Albert I, Duke of Bavaria
9. Margaret II, Countess of Hainault
2. William II, Duke of Bavaria
10. Ludwik I the Fair
5. Margaret of Brieg
11. Agnes of Głogów
1. Jacqueline, Countess of Hainaut
12. John II of France
6. Philip the Bold
13. Bonne of Bohemia
3. Margaret of Burgundy
14. Louis II of Flanders
7. Margaret III of Flanders
15. Margaret of Brabant

== Notes ==
Jacqueline, Countess of Hainaut House of Wittelsbach Born: 1401 Died: 1436
Regnal titles
Preceded by William VI & IV	Countess of Holland and Zeeland; 1417–1420	Succeeded by John III
Preceded by William VI & IV	Countess of Hainaut; 1417–1432	Succeeded by Philip I
Preceded by John III	Countess of Holland and Zeeland; 1425-1432	Succeeded by Philip I
