= Margaret of Burgundy =

Margaret of Burgundy may refer to:

- Margaret of Burgundy, Dauphine (1100–63), wife of Guigues IV of Albon
- Margaret of Burgundy, Queen of Sicily (1250–1308), daughter of Odo of Burgundy, wife of Charles I of Naples and Sicily
- Margaret of Burgundy, Queen of France (1290–1315), daughter of Robert II, Duke of Burgundy, wife of Louis X of France, mother of Joan II of Navarre
- Margaret I, Countess of Burgundy (1310–1382), niece of Margaret of Burgundy, Queen of France, daughter of Philip V of France and Joan II, Countess of Burgundy
- Margaret III, Countess of Flanders (1350–1405), granddaughter of Margaret I, Countess of Burgundy, wife of Philip the Bold, Duke of Burgundy
- Margaret of Bavaria (1363–1423), sister-in-law of Margaret of Burgundy, Duchess of Bavaria; wife of John II, Duke of Burgundy
- Margaret of Burgundy, Duchess of Bavaria (1374–1441), daughter of Margaret III, Countess of Flanders, countess of Holland and Hainaut, wife of William VI, Count of Holland
- Margaret of Burgundy, Dauphine of France (1393–1441), daughter of Margaret of Bavaria, wife of Louis, Dauphin of France & Arthur de Richemont, future Duke of Brittany
- Margaret of York (1446–1503), Duchess of Burgundy as third wife of Charles the Bold
- Archduchess Margaret of Austria, Duchess of Savoy (1480–1530), daughter of Mary, Duchess of Burgundy, and Maximilian I, Holy Roman Emperor
- Marguerite of Burgundy, Countess of Savoy (1192–1243), wife of Amadeus IV, Count of Savoy
