= Margaret, Duchess of Burgundy (disambiguation) =

Margaret of York (1446–1503) was the duchess of Burgundy from 1468 until 1477.

Three more women named Margaret were duchesses of Burgundy:

- Margaret III of Flanders (1350–1405), married to Philip of Rouvres, and later to Philip the Bold
- Margaret of Bavaria (1363–1424), wife of John the Fearless
- Margaret of Austria, Queen of Spain (1584–1611)
