= Joanna of Bavaria =

Queen of Germany and Bohemia from 1370 to 1386

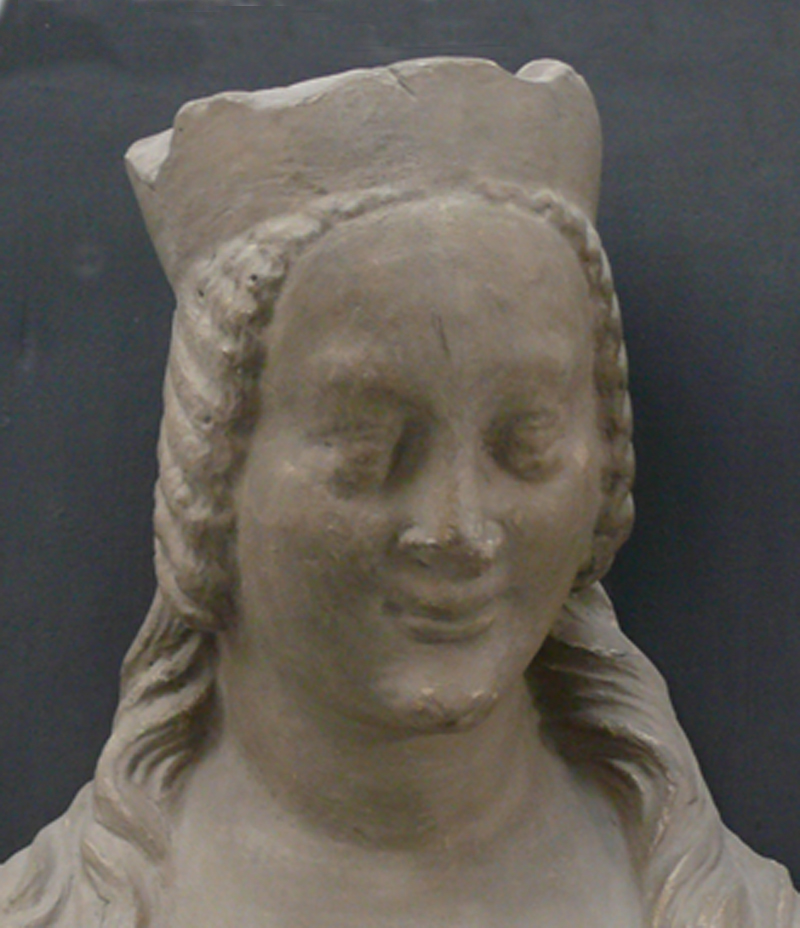

Queen consort of Germany and Bohemia
- Tenure: 1370–1386
- Born: 1356; The Hague (?)
- Died: 31 December 1386 (aged 30-31); Prague
- Burial: Prague Castle
- Spouse: Wenceslaus, King of Germany and Bohemia (m. 1370)
- House: House of Wittelsbach
- Father: Albert I, Duke of Bavaria
- Mother: Margaret of Brieg

Joanna of Bavaria (1356/1362 – 31 December 1386), a member of the House of Wittelsbach, was Queen of Germany from 1376 and Queen of Bohemia from 1378 until her death, by her marriage with the Luxembourg king Wenceslaus.

== Life ==
Presumably born in The Hague, Joanna was the second child of Duke Albert I of Bavaria (1336–1404), by his first wife Margaret (1342–1386), a daughter of the Piast duke Louis I of Brzeg. Her siblings included Count William VI of Holland, Johanna Sophia of Bavaria and Margaret of Bavaria. Her paternal grandparents were Emperor Louis IV and his consort Countess Margaret II of Hainaut.

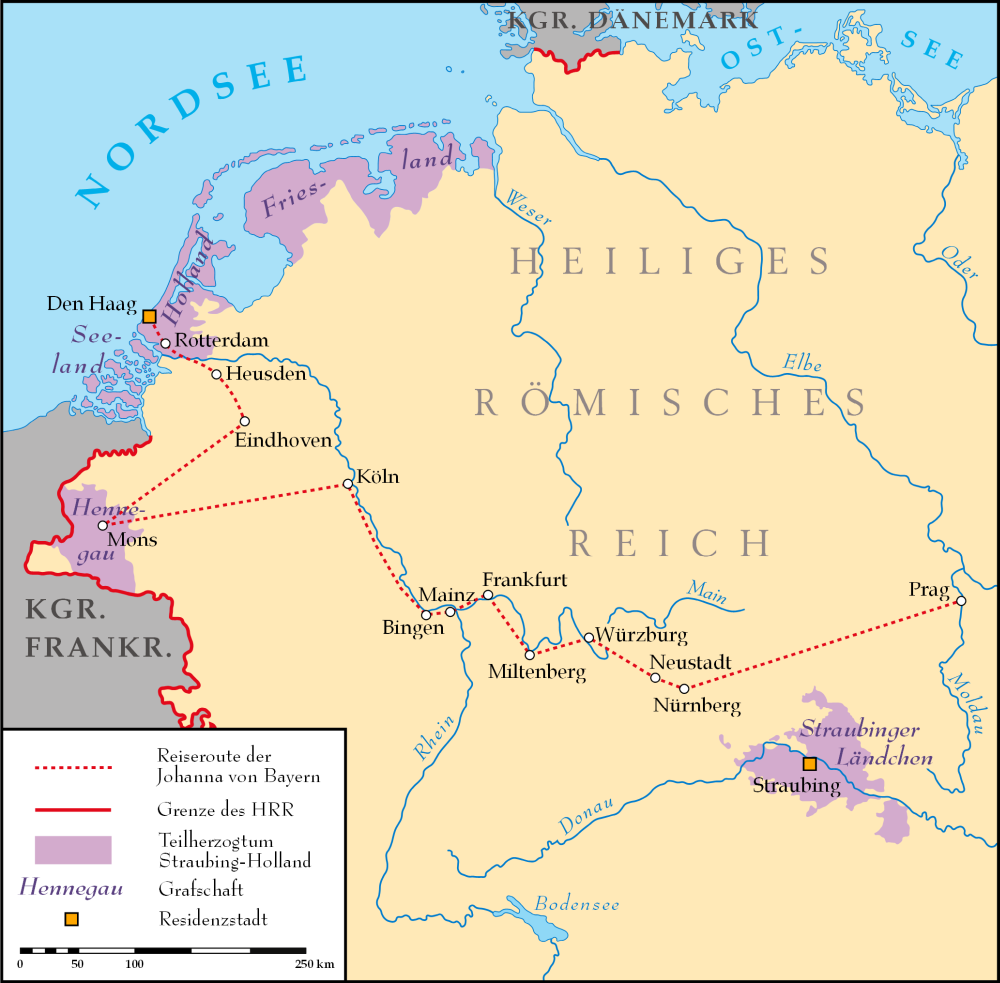
Joanna's itinerary to the Prague court, 1370

From August 1370 Joanna travelled to Prague, where she was married on 29 September 1370 to Wenceslaus, son and heir of Emperor Charles IV by his third wife, Anna of Swidnica. The emperor had to obtain a papal dispense due to the close relatedness of the couple. The marriage was not consummated until 1376.

The conjugal bond suited the Luxembourg ruler to strengthen ties with the Bavarian duke, who held extensive estates in the Low Countries; nevertheless, Joanna was not the first choice of a bride for Wenceslaus. Charles IV had initially planned for him to marry the Hohenzollern princess Elisabeth of Nuremberg, but the marriage never took place, since Elisabeth married Rupert of the Palatinate instead.

Charles had his son elected King of the Romans in 1376 and upon his death in 1378, Wenceslaus also inherited the Kingdom of Bohemia. With Wenceslaus' accession, Joanna became Queen of both Bohemia and Germany. She also became Electress of Brandenburg as successor to Wenceslaus' half-sister Catherine.

== Death ==
The marriage lasted for sixteen years, however the couple had no children. Joanna died in 1386 at the age of thirty or thirty-one. According to the letter by Milanese emissaries from 3 January 1387, she died from chronic lung disease, most likely tuberculosis.

Wenceslaus gave Johanna a magnificent funeral, which took place at Žebrák castle. According to custom, Joanna's body was exposed for a few days in Prague churches and was later buried in Prague Castle.

Wenceslaus later married Joanna's cousin, Sofia of Bavaria, but this marriage also bore no issue. Wenceslaus was deposed from the throne of Germany in 1400 and was succeeded by Elisabeth of Nuremberg's husband, Rupert.

== References and sources ==
- Translated article from Czech Wikipedia
- Jeanne von Wittelsbach

German royalty
Preceded by Elizabeth of Pomerania	Queen consort of Germany; 1376 – 1386	Vacant Title next held by Sofia of Bavaria
Preceded by Elizabeth of Pomerania	Queen consort of Bohemia; 1378 – 1386	Vacant Title next held by Sofia of Bavaria
