= Albert, Duke of Bavaria =

Albert, Duke of Bavaria may refer to:

- Albert I of Bavaria (1336–1404), count of Holland, Hainaut, and Zeeland
- Albert II of Bavaria (1368–1397), count of Holland, Hainaut, and Zeeland
- Albert III of Bavaria (1401–1460)
- Albert IV of Bavaria (1447–1508)
- Albert V of Bavaria (1528–1579)
- Albert VI of Bavaria (1584–1666)
- Albrecht, Duke of Bavaria (1905–1996)
