= Frank van Borssele =

Zeelandic nobleman (c. 1396–1470)

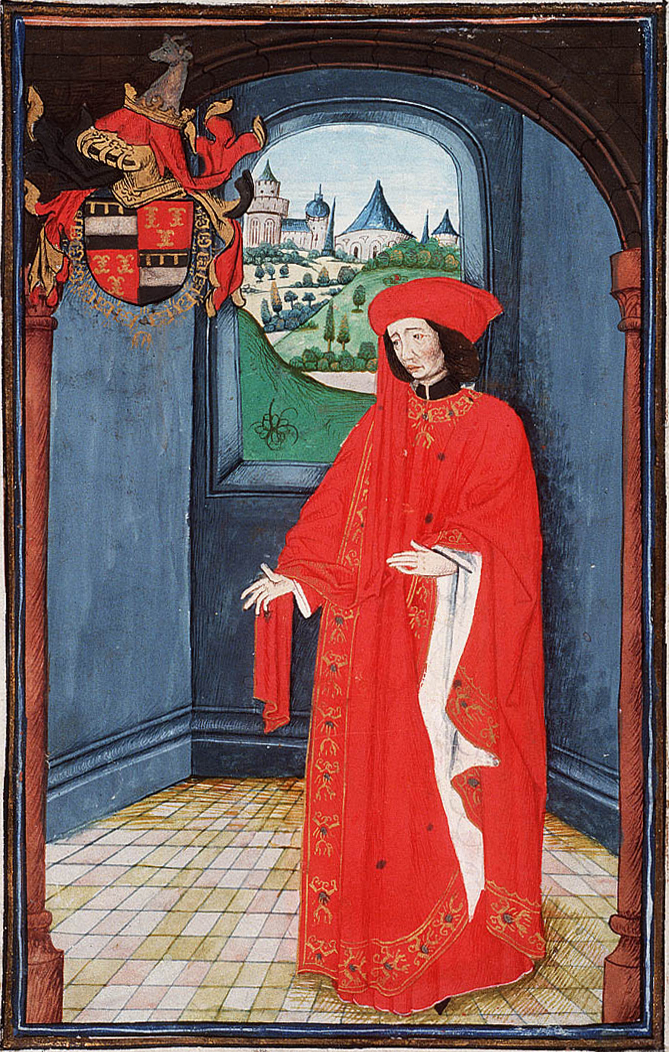
Frank van Borssele

Frank II of Borssele (probably around 1396 – 19 November 1470, Den Briel) was a 15th-century Zeelandic nobleman.

== Biography ==
He was stadhouder of Holland and Zeeland, but is mainly known as the fourth husband of countess Jacqueline of Holland. He was the son of Oda van Bergen and Floris van Borssele, Lord of Sint Maartensdijk, Scherpenisse (both now districts of Tholen) and Zuylen. He was the last legitimate representative of the younger branch of the old and powerful Zeeland noble Borssele family.

After succeeding her father, Jacqueline of Hainaut's authority was challenged by her uncle John III in the 1420s. In her place, her second husband John IV, Duke of Brabant appointed John III as ruler of Holland and Zeeland. From late 1421 to early 1423 Frank van Borssele played an essential role in the financial government of the county, as he was a loyal supporter of John III and Philip the Good, Duke of Burgundy. In 1422/23 he was alderman of Count John III and official governor of the country.

The height of his power, however, were the years 1426 to 1432. Duke Philip the Good of Burgundy had taken over the position of regent of Holland and Zeeland after the death of John III and on 21 March 1426 Frank was appointed by Duke Philip as General and Grandcaptain of Zeeland, together with his second cousin Hendrik II van Borselen.
In 1428 Jacqueline signed the Treaty of Delft, which left her Countess only in name, with Frank van Borssele as the regent of her lands. This gave him more power and more control over the counties' finances. In 1430 Borssele was the Burgundian stadhouder and "Opperhoutvester" of Holland, in the same year he became lord of Gorinchem, Leerdam, de Leede and Schoonrewoerd.

In the summer of 1432, the power of Frank van Borssele reached its peak. Philip the Good, fearful of yet another pretender to the titles of Count of Holland and Zeeland kidnapped Frank and incarcerated him in Flanders. Legend later tells another story in which Frank and Jacqueline of Hainaut fell in love and secretly married in 1432. He was released in 1433 and his properties were restored. This marriage, which was – at least from Jacqueline's side – one made out of love, did not last long. Jacqueline died on October 9, 1436. Frank survived his wife for 34 years.

He remained a loyal servant to the Burgundian duke's and in 1445 he became Knight in the Order of the Golden Fleece.
