= Margaret of Brieg =

Duchess consort of Bavaria
- Tenure: 1353–1386
- Born: 1342
- Died: 1386 (aged 43–44)
- Spouse: Albert I, Duke of Bavaria
- Issue: Katharina, Duchess of Gelders and Jülich; Johanna, Queen of the Romans and Bohemia; Margaret, Duchess of Burgundy; William II, Duke of Bavaria; Albert II, Duke of Bavaria; Joanna Sophia, Duchess of Austria; John III, Duke of Bavaria
- House: Piast
- Father: Ludwik I the Fair
- Mother: Agnes of Głogów

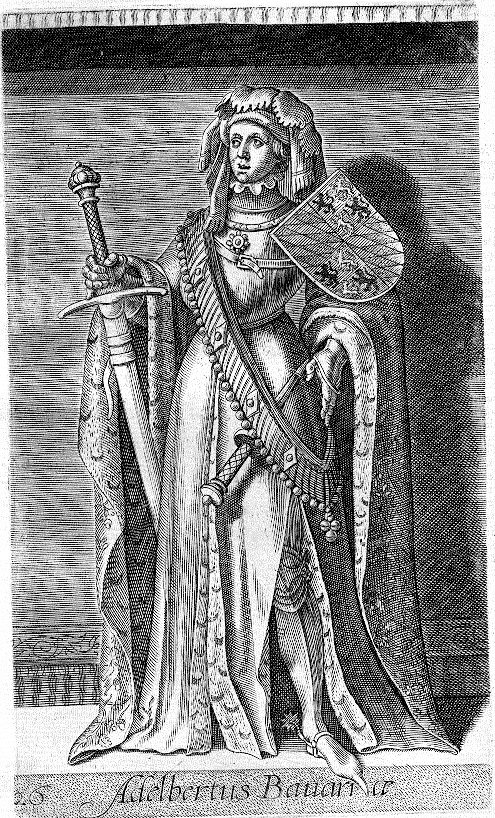
Albert I

Margaret of Brieg (1342–1386) was the daughter of Ludwik I the Fair and Agnes of Sagan. She was Duchess consort of Bavaria by her marriage to Albert I, Duke of Bavaria.

== Family ==
Margaret was the eldest of six siblings. Her brother was Henry VII of Brzeg and her sister, Hedwig, was married to Jan II of Oświęcim.

Margaret's maternal grandparents were Henry IV the Faithful and Matilde of Brandenburg. Her paternal grandparents were Bolesław III the Generous and his first wife Margaret of Bohemia.

Margaret of Bohemia was the youngest surviving child of Wenceslaus II of Bohemia and Judith of Habsburg. Judith was the youngest daughter of Rudolf I of Germany and Gertrude of Hohenberg.

== Marriage ==
In Passau after 19 July 1353, Margaret and Albert were married. He kept mistresses and lovers, but during his reign, troubles erupted between parties because of a woman, Aleid van Poelgeest. People did not like her because she gained political influence which was resented. Van Poelgeest was murdered in September 1392 by Hook nobles. A few years after Margaret's death, Aleid was murdered in The Hague.

Even though Albert had mistresses and lovers, the couple still had seven children; all of the children lived to adulthood. This was very uncommon during the time, when many offspring used to die in infancy and expecting mothers died during childbirth. Margaret and Louis had:

1. Katharina (c. 1361–1400, Hattem), married in Geertruidenberg in 1379 William I of Gelders and Jülich
2. Johanna (c. 1362–1386), wife of Wenceslaus, King of the Romans
3. Margaret (1363 – 23 January 1423, Dijon), married in Cambrai in 1385 John the Fearless, son of Philip the Bold
4. William VI, Count of Holland (1365–1417), married in 1385 Margaret, daughter of Philip the Bold
5. Albert II, Duke of Bavaria-Straubing (1369 – 21 January 1397, Kelheim)
6. Joanna Sophia (c. 1373 – 15 November 1410, Vienna), married on 15 June 1395 Albert IV, Duke of Austria
7. John, Count of Holland (1374/76 – 1425), Bishop of Liège

All of Margaret's daughters married into powerful royal families. One daughter, Johanna Sophia, was the grandmother of Ladislaus the Posthumous. Another daughter, Margaret, was the mother of Philip the Good, Duke of Burgundy.

== Death ==
Margaret died in 1386, aged around 44. She left her husband a widower. After the death of Margaret, Albert married another woman, also named Margaret, but she was from the Duchy of Cleves. His only legitimate children were from Margaret of Brieg. He had no issue by Margaret of Cleves, but they held court together in The Hague. Margaret of Brieg was buried in the Court Chapel at the Binnenhof in The Hague.

== Sources ==
- Stein, Robert (2017). Magnanimous Dukes and Rising States: The Unification of the Burgundian Netherlands, 1380-1480. Oxford University Press.

Preceded by Maud, Countess of Leicester	Duchess consort of Bavaria; 19 July 1353–1386	Succeeded by Margaret of Cleves
