= Aleid van Poelgeest =

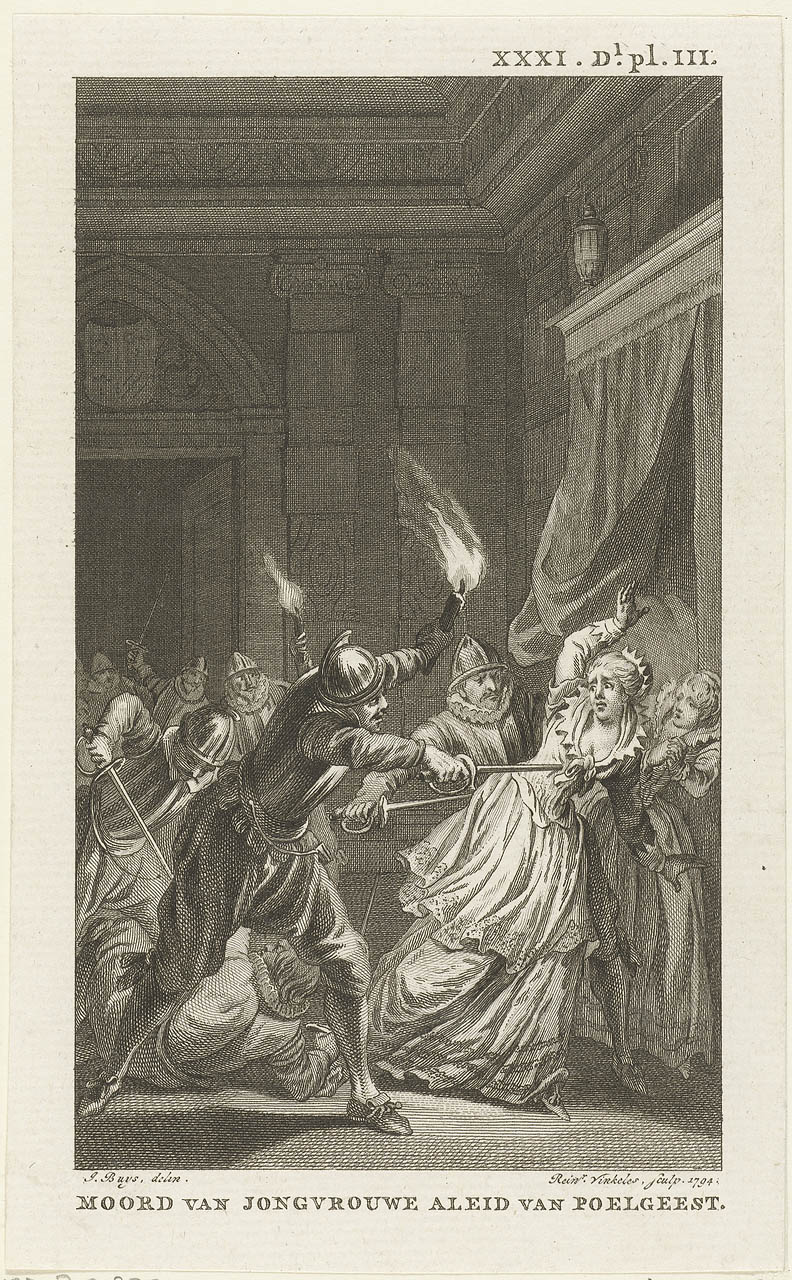
The killing of Aleid van Poelgeest

Aleid of Poelgeest (Koudekerk aan den Rijn, c. 1370 - The Hague, September 22, 1392) was the mistress of the Count of Holland, Albert I of Bavaria.

== Life ==
Aleid van Poelgeest was the daughter of the court official Jan van Poelgeest and Aleid van Beest Gerbrandsdr. She is traditionally assumed to have served as a maid-of-honour to the spouse of Albert, Margaret of Brieg, prior to becoming his mistress. She never married.

Van Poelgeest is noted to have been present at court at least since 1386. In June 1388, Albert gave her an allowance, her own house and maids and installed her as his official mistress. It was noted that she followed him around on his journeys in his domains. She was reputed to have had great influence over Albert, but whether this was true is unconfirmed.

On the night of 22–23 September 1392, she was murdered along with the "Meesterknaap" (a high court dignitary), William Cuser in The Hague by Hook nobles. Why exactly Aleid was killed, is not certain.

Albert saw the murder as a personal attack on his authority and used this event to settle scores with a number of political opponents.
