= De Leede =

De Leede is a Dutch surname. Notable people with the surname include:

- Babette de Leede (born 1999), Dutch cricketer and cousin of Bas
- Bas de Leede (born 1999), Dutch cricketer, son of Tim and cousin of Babette
- Tim de Leede (born 1968), Dutch cricketer, father of Bas
