= Joanna Sophie of Bavaria =

- Duchess consort of Austria
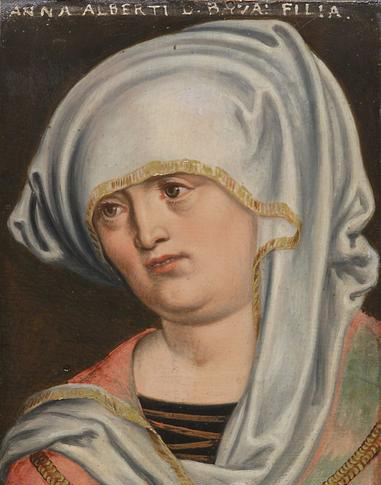
- Joanna Sophie of Bavaria by Anton Boys
- Tenure: 1395–1404
- Born: c. 1373
- Died: 15 November 1410 (aged 36–37); Vienna
- Spouse: Albert IV, Duke of Austria
- Issue: Albert II of Germany; Margarete, Duchess of Bavaria
- House: Wittelsbach
- Father: Albert I, Duke of Bavaria
- Mother: Margaret of Brieg

Joanna Sophie of Bavaria (c. 1373 – 15 November 1410) was the youngest daughter of Albert I, Duke of Bavaria and his first wife Margaret of Brieg. She was a member of the House of Wittelsbach.

In 1396, Joanna Sophie married Albert IV, Duke of Austria. The marriage between the two ended a feud between Joanna Sophie's father and Albert's father, Albert III of Austria. Joanna Sophie's father agreed to the payment of 10,000 Pfennige and he gave Albert III the fortress of Natternberg and the town of Deggendorf.

The marriage produced two children; both of whom survived to adulthood. They were:

1. Albert V (16 August 1397–27 October 1439, Neszmély, Hungary).
2. Margaret (26 June 1395, Vienna–24 December 1447), married in Landshut 25 November 1412 to Duke Henry XVI of Bavaria.

Albert would often quarrel with members of Joanna Sophie's family, such as their brother-in-law Wenceslaus, King of the Romans and his half-brother Sigismund, Holy Roman Emperor. This ended only when Albert died in 1404. Joanna Sophie arranged marriages for her children. She made negotiations with Frederick, Duke of Bavaria, to marry her daughter, Margaret to his son, Henry XVI, Duke of Bavaria. Henry and Margaret married two years after Joanna Sophie's death.

Her son Albert married Elizabeth of Luxembourg, the only child of Emperor Sigismund.

Joanna Sophie died aged thirty-six or thirty-seven in Vienna.
