= Treaty of Delft =

1428 treaty between Bavaria and Burgundy

Coat of arms of the counts of Flanders

The Treaty of Delft, also called the Reconciliation of Delft, was signed on 3 July 1428 between Jacqueline of Bavaria and Philip the Good, Count of Flanders and Duke of Burgundy.

The agreement ended hostilities during the Hook and Cod wars in the County of Holland between the Hooks, supported by England, and the Cods, supported by the county of Flanders. Based on the terms of the agreement, Jacqueline remained nominally Countess of Holland, Zeeland and Hainaut, but Philip the Good would administer the government of the County of Holland, County of Zeeland, and the County of Hainaut. Moreover, should Jacqueline perish without any offspring to succeed her, Philip the Good would be declared the heir to the throne of the Counties of Holland, Zeeland and Hainaut. Furthermore, Jacqueline was forbidden to remarry without the consent of Philip.

When Jacqueline married Frank van Borssele without Philip's consent in 1432, the treaty was considered broken, and Philip took full control of the three counties.

== See also ==
- List of treaties
