= Albert II of Bavaria =

Duke of Bavaria-Straubing (1368–1397)

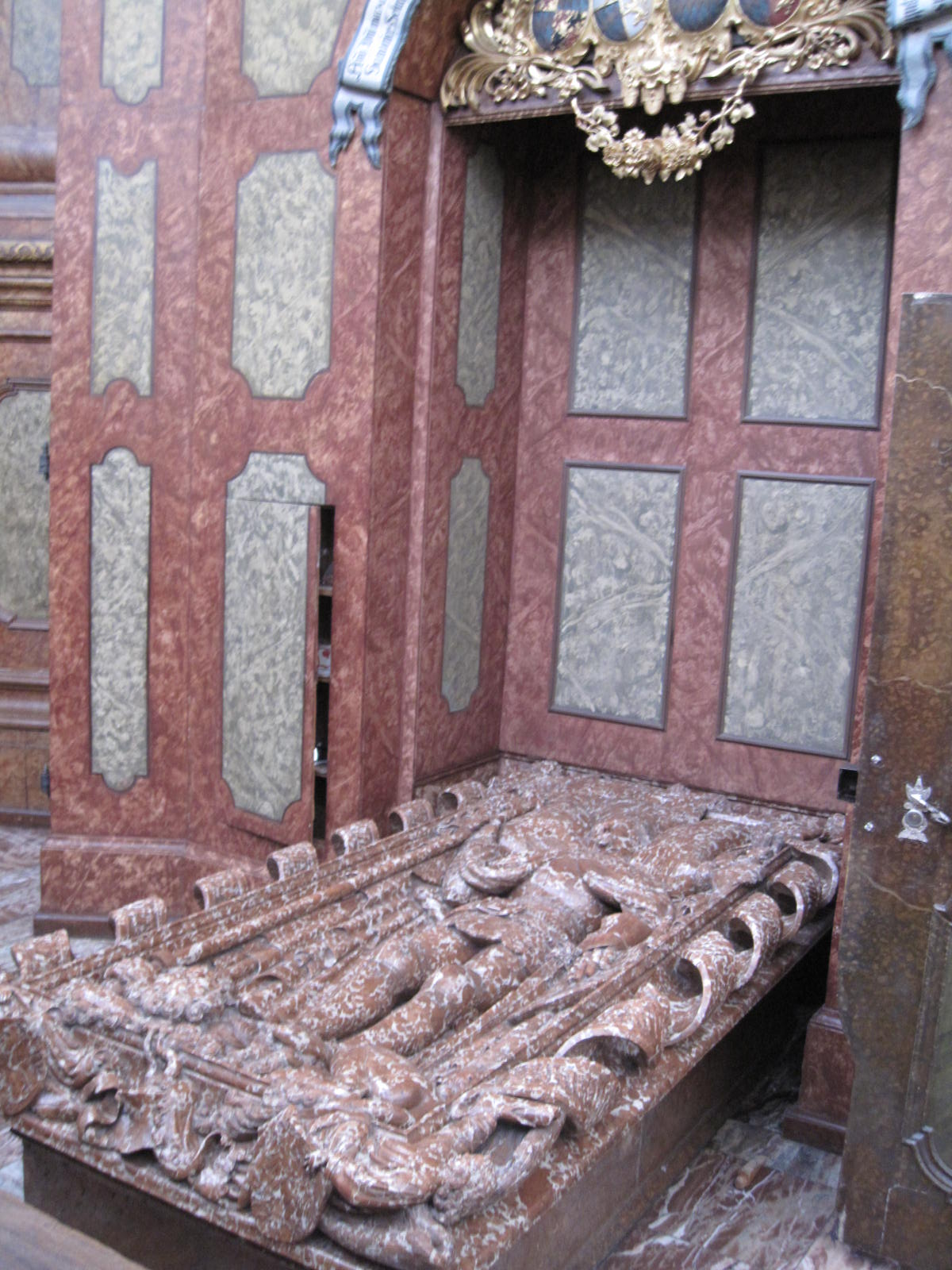
Albert II's tomb in Straubing, Karmelitenkirche

Albert II (German: Albrecht; 1368 – January 21, 1397) was duke of Bavaria-Straubing alongside his father Albert I, who also ruled the counties of Holland, Hainaut, and Zeeland in the Low Countries. Additionally, from 1389 until his death in 1397, he administered the Bavarian province of Straubing in the name of his father, it being his Bavarian ducal line's appanage and seat. Albert II's mother was Margaret of Brieg, great-granddaughter of Wenceslaus II of Bohemia. He died in Kelheim.

Albert II of Bavaria House of Wittelsbach Born: 1368 Died: 21 January 1397
Preceded by Albert I	Duke of Bavaria-Straubing; 1389-1397; With: Albert I	Succeeded by Albert I
