= John III of Bavaria =

Noble and first Bishop of Liège (1374–1425)

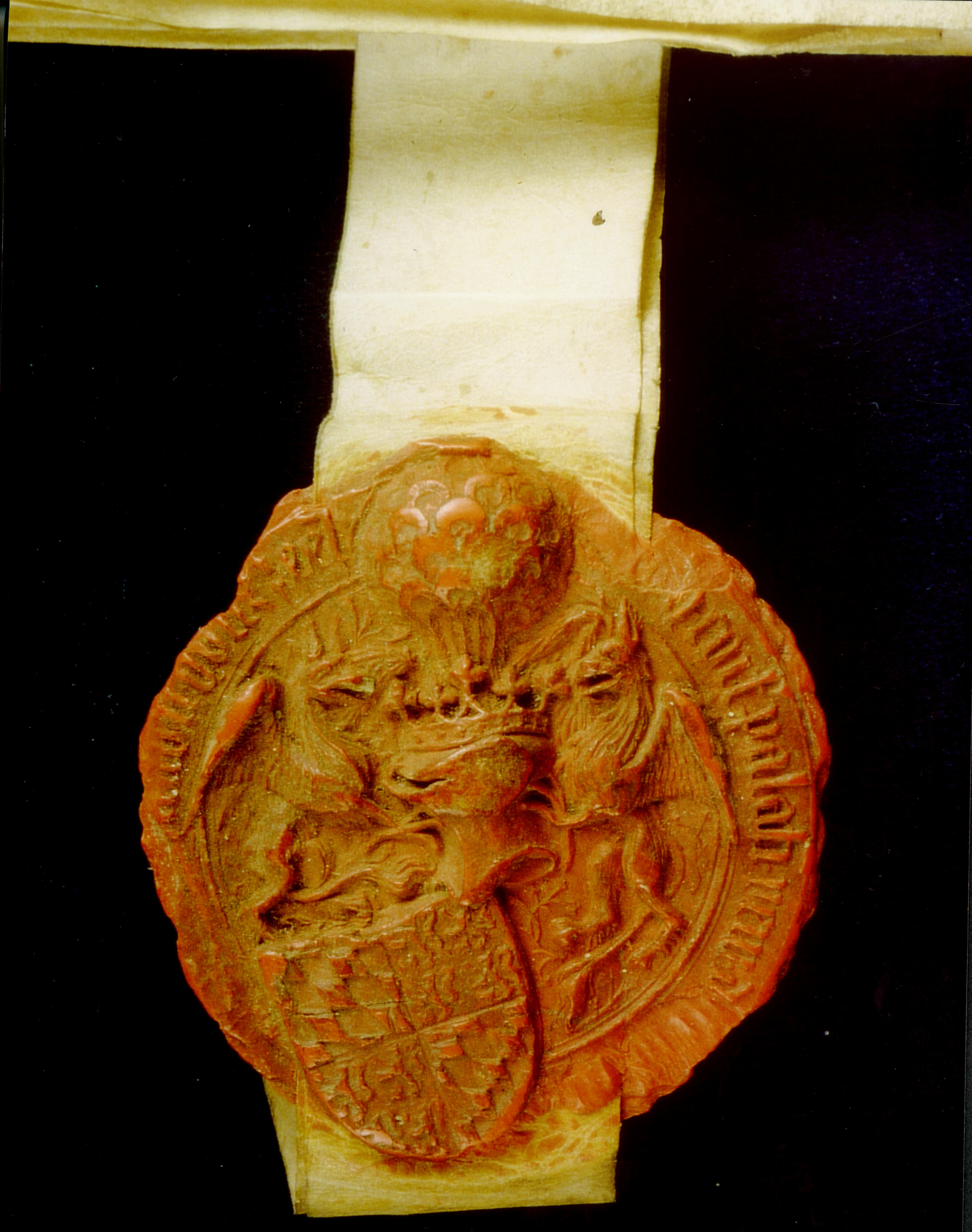
Seal of John III

John III the Pitiless (1374 – 6 January 1425), of the House of Wittelsbach, was first bishop of Liège 1389–1418 and then duke of Bavaria-Straubing and count of Holland and Hainaut 1418–1425.

== Family ==
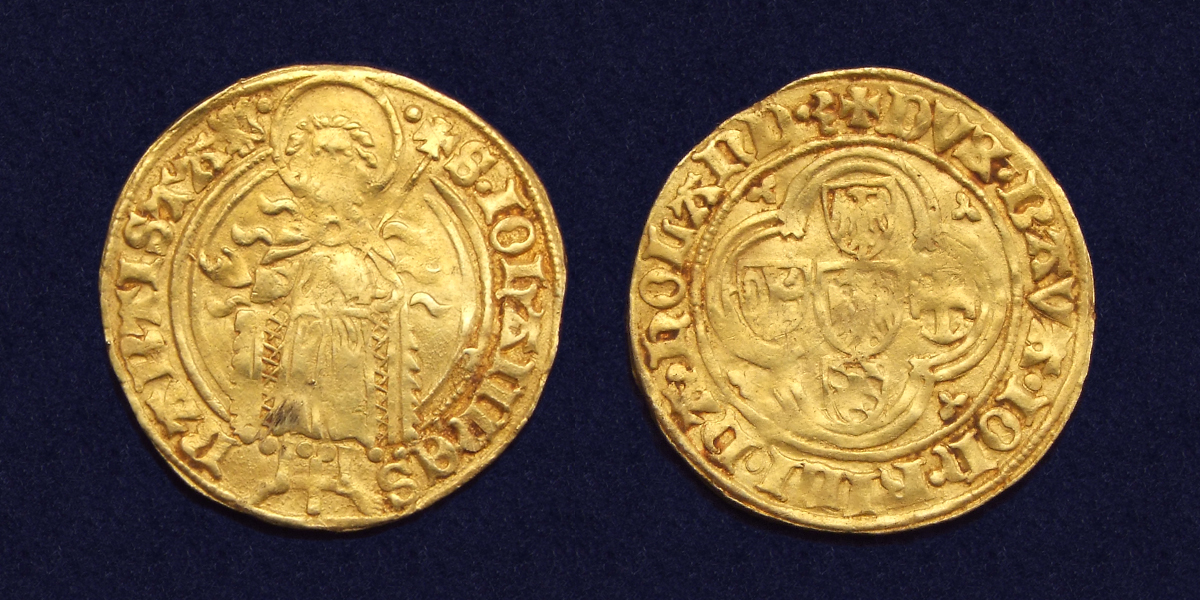
Holland, gold florin or 'Beiersgulden' with St John the Baptist, struck 1421-1422 by John of Bavaria

John was born in Le Quesnoy. He was the youngest son of Duke Albert I of Bavaria and Margaret of Brieg. His elder brother was William II, who succeeded their father as count of Holland, Zeeland and Hainault in 1404. His sister, Margaret, married Duke John the Fearless of Burgundy in 1385.

== Bishop ==
As the youngest son of three, John was destined for a career in the church. At the age of 15, he became Prince-Bishop of Liège, with the support of Pope Boniface IX. John's rule was a disaster. His authoritarian style clashed with the nobles and burghers of the Prince-Bishopric. He was expelled several times and saw even a counter-bishop being elected. John turned for help to his brother and brother-in-law.

On 23 September 1408, a Burgundian army led by his brother-in-law John the Fearless went to the aid of John III against the citizens of Liège, who were in open revolt. During the battle just outside the village of Othee, a battle was fought which saw the men from Liège being decisively defeated. This led to the bishopric of Liège becoming a protectorate of Burgundy. John ordered the beheading of suspicious burghers and noblemen in Liège, while others were drowned in the Meuse, from then on he was called "the Pitiless".

== Duke and count ==
When his brother died in 1417 and was succeeded by his daughter Jacqueline as countess of Holland and Hainaut, John the Pitiless rejected holy orders and surrendered his bishopric. In 1418, John III married Elisabeth, Duchess of Luxembourg, who was then the widow of Antoine, Duke of Brabant. No children came from this marriage.

With the aid of Emperor Sigismund, who was his wife's uncle, John III immediately started a war against his niece Jacqueline and her husband Duke John IV of Brabant. John the Pitiless supported the city of Dordrecht and Duke Philip the Good of Burgundy. A siege of Dordrecht in 1419 was unsuccessful, so John IV of Brabant agreed to start a joint administration with John III. Jacqueline, as a woman, did not get a share in the political responsibility. John IV of Brabant finally gave up Holland and Hainaut and left the rule to John the Pitiless. Jacqueline went to England in 1421 and married the king's brother, Humphrey, Duke of Gloucester. She was unable to retain control over Holland and Hainaut much longer after John's death.

== Death and legacy ==
John the Pitiless was known for the rich culture of his court; Jan van Eyck was among the artists he engaged, from at least 1422 until 1424. John the Pitiless died of poison in 1425 in The Hague. His Court Marshal Jan van Vliet had allegedly poisoned the pages of the ducal prayer-book, and had already been executed in 1424. Bavaria-Straubing was divided between the dukes of Bavaria, the major portion of which went to Bavaria-Munich.

== See also ==
- Counts of Hainaut family tree

== Sources ==
- Warnar, Geert (2012). "The Dominican, the Duke and the Book. The Authority of the Written Word in Dirc van Delft's Tafel van den kersten gelove (ca.1400)". In Brusati, Celeste; Enenkel, Karl A. E.; Melion, Walter (eds.). The Authority of the Word: Reflecting on Image and Text in Northern Europe, 1400-1700. Brill. pp. 49–74.

John of Bavaria-Hainaut House of Wittelsbach Born: 1374 in Le Quesnoy Died: 6 January 1425 in The Hague
Preceded by Arnold of Horne	Prince-Bishop of Liège; 1389–1418	Succeeded by John of Wallenrode
Preceded by Jacqueline	Duke of Bavaria-Straubing; 1417–1425	Succeeded by Ernest
Preceded by Jacqueline	Count of Holland and Zeeland; 1420–1425	Succeeded by Jacqueline
Preceded by Elisabeth	Duke of Luxemburg; 1418-1425; With: Elisabeth	Succeeded by Elisabeth
