= Albert I of Bavaria =

German nobleman (1336–1404)

Albert I
- Duke of Lower Bavaria
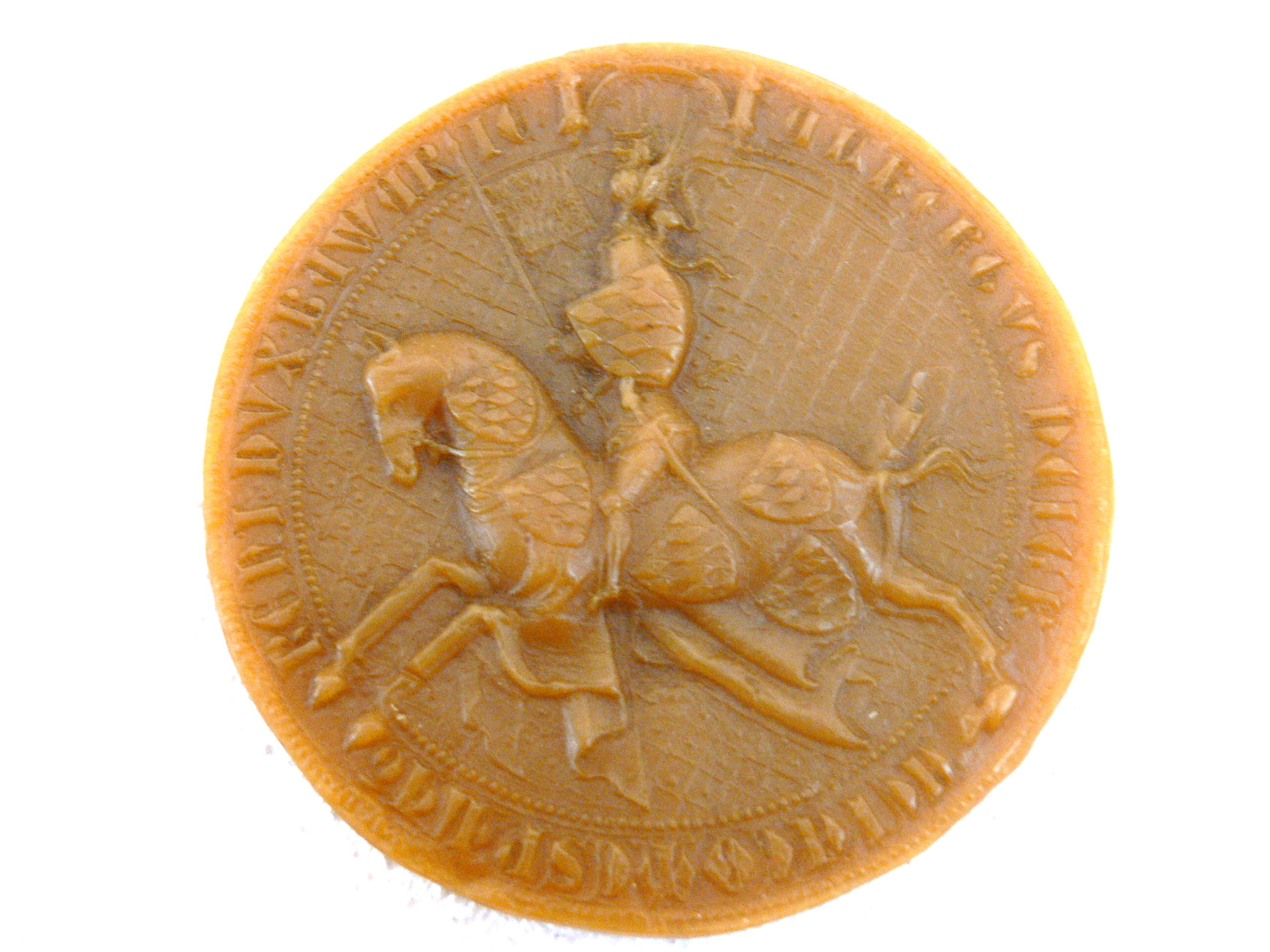
- Seal of 1363
- Born: 25 July 1336; Munich
- Died: 13 December 1404 (aged 68); The Hague
- Spouse: Margaret of Brieg; Margaret of Cleves
- Issue: Katharina, Duchess of Gelders and Jülich; Johanna, Queen of Bohemia; Margaret, Duchess of Burgundy; William VI, Count of Holland; Albert II, Duke of Lower Bavaria; Joanna Sophia, Duchess of Austria; John, Duke of Lower Bavaria
- House: House of Wittelsbach
- Father: Louis IV, Holy Roman Emperor
- Mother: Margaret II, Countess of Holland

Albert I, Duke of Lower Bavaria (German: Albrecht; 25 July 1336 – 13 December 1404) was a feudal ruler of the counties of Holland, Hainaut, and Zeeland in the Low Countries. Additionally, he held a portion of the Bavarian province of Straubing, his Bavarian ducal line's appanage and seat, Lower Bavaria.

== Biography ==
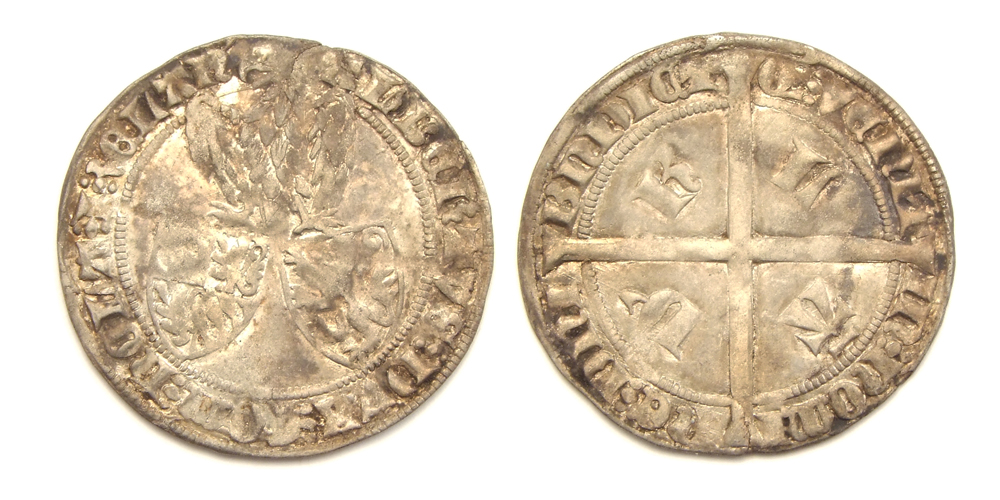
Silver groat or 'voetdrager', struck under Albert of Bavaria. Mintplace: Dordrecht 1389-1404.

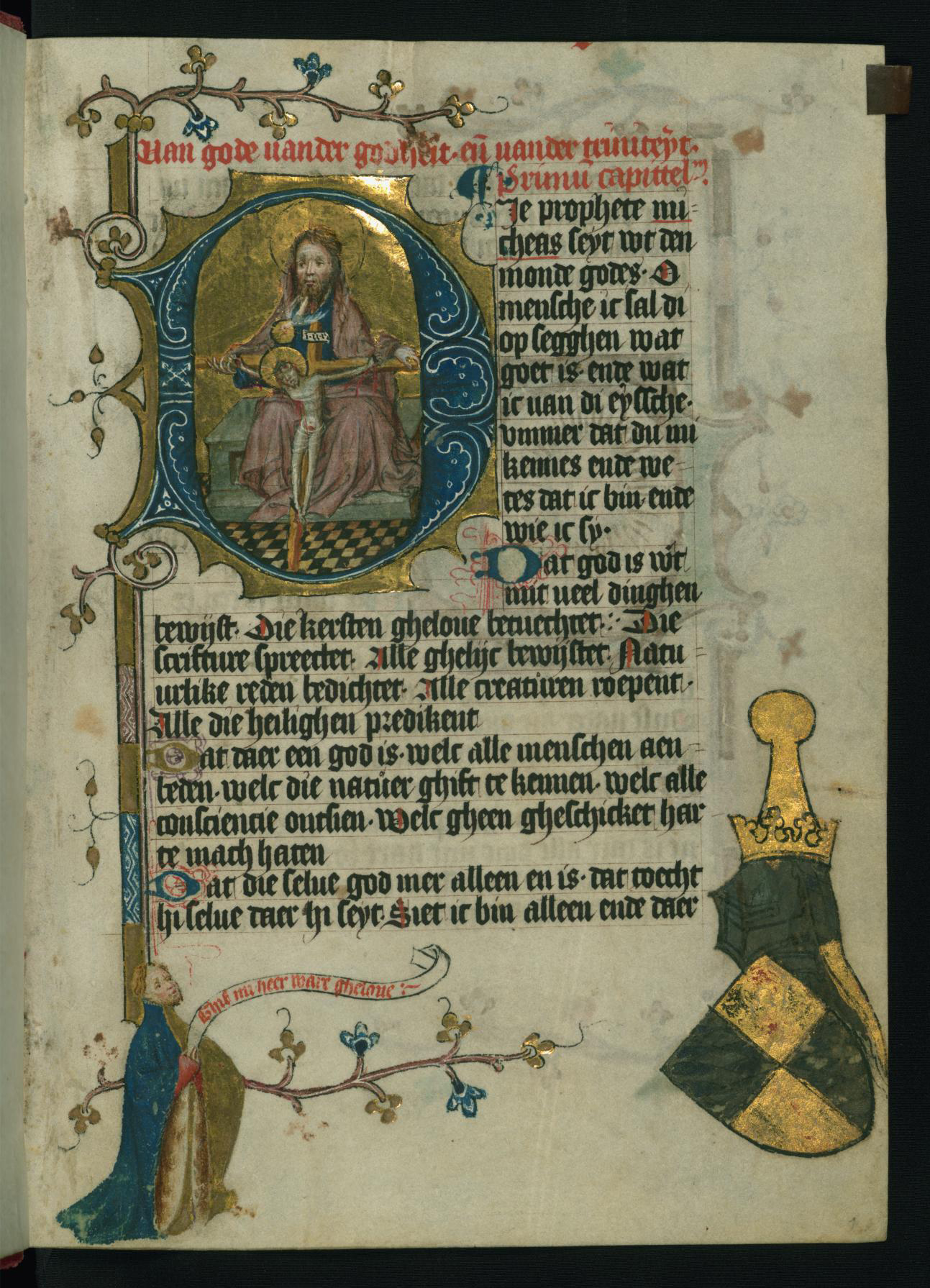
The Trinity with Albrecht of Bavaria (1400–1404).

=== Early years ===
Albert was born in Munich, the third son of Louis IV, Holy Roman Emperor, by his second wife Margaret II, Countess of Hainaut and Holland. Albert was originally a younger son, apportioned at best an appanage. He was only 10 years old when his father died, leaving most of his Bavarian inheritance to his eldest half-brother, Louis V, Duke of Bavaria, but also some appanages to the younger sons.

His elder brother, William V, Count of Holland, had engaged in a long struggle with their mother, obtaining Holland and Zeeland from her in 1354, and Hainaut on her death in 1356. William was supported by the party of burghers of the cities. They were opposed in this by the Hook faction, the party of disaffected nobles who were supporters of Empress Margaret. Margaret had resigned her sovereignty in favour of her son William V, but the result was a period of great upheavals and chaos which gave rise to the formation of these two opposing parties.

=== Regent of Holland ===
William's insanity resulted in the appointment of the then 22-year-old Albert as governor (or regent or ruwaard) of his brother's territories from 1358 onwards. During Albert's regency, affairs ran smoothly and trade improved. Troubles between the two political parties, the Hoeks ("Hooks") and Kabeljauws ("Cods"), remained barely beneath the surface. William lived for another thirty years. Albert did not formally succeed him until his death in 1388, by which time he had already arranged the marriage of his daughters to a number of Imperial princes and other nobles. The eldest daughter to have children was Margaret; her son Philip III, Duke of Burgundy would ultimately inherit Albert's territories.

=== Count of Holland ===
In Albert's own reign, troubles erupted between the Hoeks and the Kabeljauws because of a woman. Albert always had mistresses, but this time his attentions were drawn to Aleid van Poelgeest, a member of the Kabeljauw party. She was considered very beautiful and was able to gain political influence which was resented. A plot was hatched among the Hoeks as well as members of Albert's household. On 22 September 1392 Aleid was murdered in The Hague by Hoek nobles.

In his rage Albert persecuted the Hoeks, by sword and fire, conquering one castle after the other. Even his own son and heir, William, did not feel safe and went to live in Hainault. During his last years, Albert fought the Frisians. They were beaten time and time again, but were never completely conquered.

On Albert's death in 1404, he was succeeded by his eldest son, William. A younger son, John III, became Bishop of Liège. However, on William's death in 1417, a war of succession broke out between John and William's daughter Jacqueline of Hainaut. This would be the last episode of the Hook and Cod wars and would lead to the counties being placed into Burgundian hands.

== Family and children ==
Coats of arms of the counts of Hainaut and Holland of the Wittelsbach family

Albert married in Passau after 19 July 1353, Margaret of Brieg from Silesia (1342/43 – 1386), and had seven children, all of whom lived to adulthood:

1. Katherine of Bavaria (c. 1361 – 1400, Hattem), married in Geertruidenberg in 1379 William I of Gelders and Jülich.
2. Joanna of Bavaria (c. 1362 – 31 December 1386), married Wenceslaus, King of the Romans.
3. Margaret of Bavaria (1363 – 23 January 1423, Dijon), married in Cambrai in 1385 John the Fearless.
4. William II, Duke of Bavaria (5 April 1365 – 31 May 1417) married also in 1385, Margeret, sister of John the Fearless. Father of Jacqueline of Hainault.
5. Albert II, Duke of Bavaria (1369 – 21 January 1397, Kelheim).
6. Joanna Sophia (c. 1373 – 15 November 1410, Vienna), married on 15 June 1395 Albert IV, Duke of Austria.
7. John, Count of Holland (1374/76 – 6 January 1425), Bishop of Liège.

He also had several illegitimate children.

Albert contracted a second marriage in 1394 in Heusden with Margaret of Cleves (c. 1375 – 1412), sister of Adolph I, Duke of Cleves, but they had no children. He died in The Hague, aged 68.

== Sources ==
- van Oostrom, F. P. (1992). Court and Culture: Dutch Literature, 1350-1450. Translated by Pomerans, Arnold J. University of California Press.
- Wavrin, Jean de (2012). Hardy, William (ed.). Recueil Des Chroniques Et Anchiennes Istories de la Grant Bretaigne, A Present Nomme Engleterre: From 1422-1431 (in French). Vol. 3. Cambridge University Press.

== See also ==
- Counts of Hainaut family tree

Albert I of Bavaria House of Wittelsbach Born: 25 July 1336 Died: 13 December 1404
Preceded by Louis IV	Duke of Bavaria; 1347–1349 with Louis V, Stephen II, Louis VI, William I, Otto V	Partitioned
New title	Duke of Lower Bavaria; 1349–1353 with Stephen II and William I	Partitioned
New title	Duke of Bavaria-Straubing; 1353–1404 with William I and Albert II	Succeeded by William II of Bavaria
Preceded by William I of Bavaria	Count of Holland, Hainaut and Zeeland; 1388–1404	Succeeded by William II of Bavaria
