= Margaret of Bavaria =

Duchess consort of Burgundy (1363–1424)

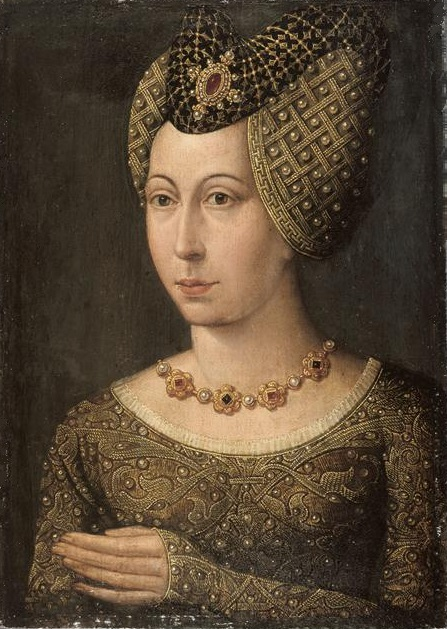
- 16th-century anonymous painting of Margaret

Duchess consort of Burgundy
- Tenure: 1404–1419
- Born: 1363
- Died: 23 January 1424 (aged 60–61); Dijon
- Spouse: John the Fearless, Duke of Burgundy (m. 1385; died 1419)
- Issue: Catherine; Marie, Duchess of Cleves; Margaret, Duchess of Brittany; Philip III, Duke of Burgundy; Isabelle, Countess of Penthièvre and Périgord; Anne, Duchess of Bedford; Agnes, Duchess of Bourbon
- House: Wittelsbach
- Father: Albert I, Duke of Bavaria
- Mother: Margaret of Brieg

Margaret of Bavaria (1363 – 23 January 1424) was Duchess of Burgundy by marriage to John the Fearless. She was the regent of the Burgundian Low Countries during the absence of her husband in 1404–1419 and the regent in French Burgundy during the absence of her son in 1419–1423. She became most known for her successful defense of the Duchy of Burgundy against Count John IV of Armagnac in 1419.

== Life ==
Margaret was the fifth child of Albert I, Duke of Bavaria, Count of Hainault, Holland, and Zeeland and Lord of Frisia, and Margaret of Brieg.

=== Marriage ===
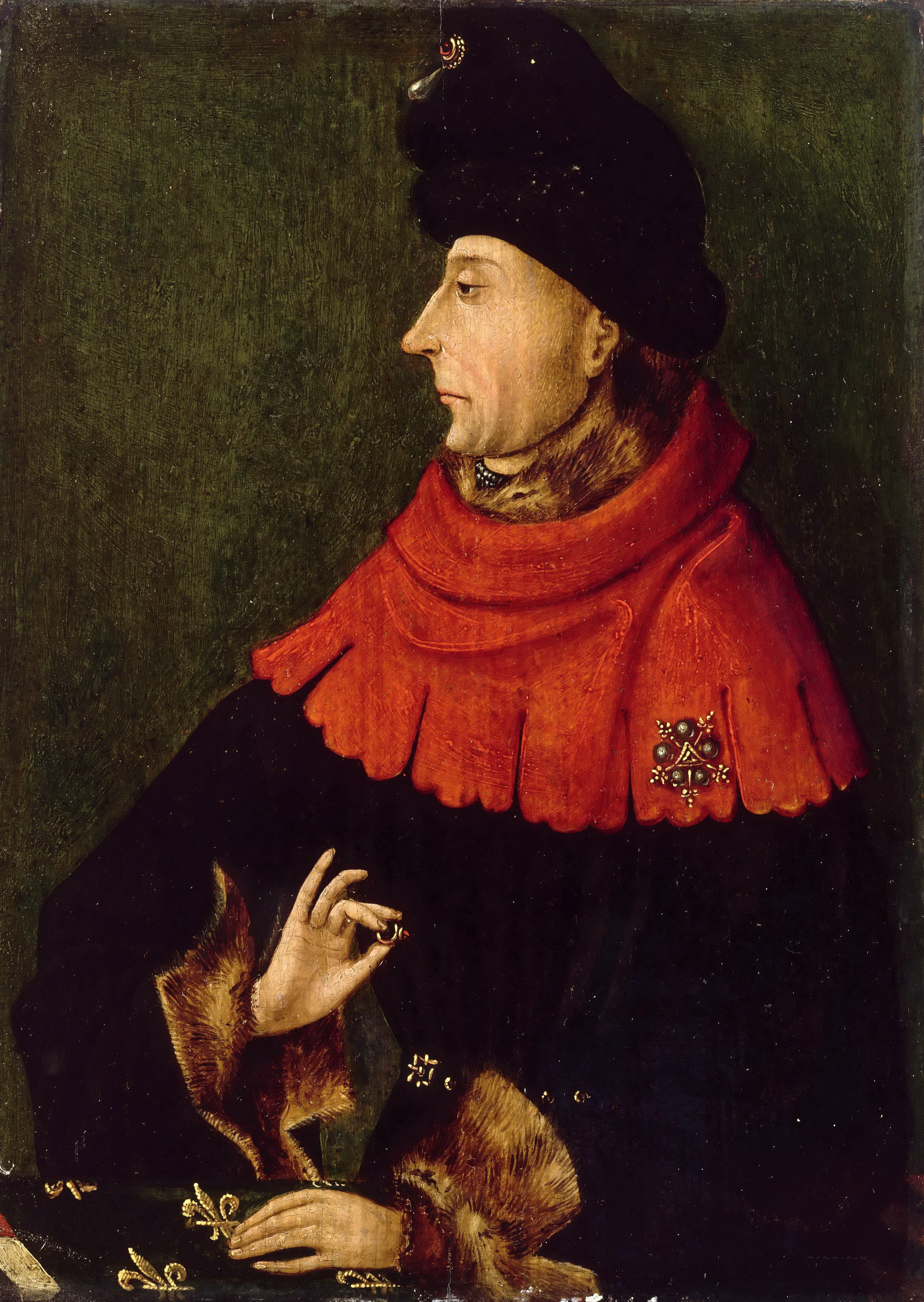
John the Fearless, Margaret's husband

On 12 April 1385, at the Burgundian double wedding in Cambrai, Margaret married John, Count of Nevers, the son and heir of Philip the Bold, Duke of Burgundy, and Margaret of Dampierre, Countess of Flanders, Artois and Burgundy; at the same time her brother, William II, Duke of Bavaria, married Margaret of Burgundy.

=== Duchess regent ===
With the death of Philip the Bold in 1404, and Margaret of Dampierre in 1405, John inherited his parents' territories, and Margaret became duchess. In 1409, she was named deputy regent of the Duchy of Burgundy to rule whenever her husband was absent from the Duchy to attend to other parts of his realm. In 1419, Margaret became a widow. Her son confirmed his father's appointment of Margaret as deputy regent of Burgundy, and she ruled Burgundy during the absence of her son in 1419–1423.

== Children ==
Margaret and John had:

- Margaret, Countess of Gien and Montargis (1393–2 February 1442, Paris), married, on 30 August 1404, Louis, Dauphin of France, then, on 10 October 1422, Arthur de Richemont, Constable of France, the future Duke of Brittany
- Catherine (d. 1414, Ghent)
- Mary (d. 30 October 1463, Monterberg bei Kalkar), married Adolph I, Duke of Cleves
- Philip the Good (1396–1467), Duke of Burgundy, Count of Flanders
- Isabella, Countess of Penthièvre (d. 18 September 1412, Rouvres), married at Arras on 22 July 1406 to Olivier de Châtillon-Blois, Count of Penthièvre and Périgord
- Joan (b. 1399, Bouvres), d. young
- Anne (1404 – 14 November 1432, Paris), married John, Duke of Bedford
- Agnes (1407 – 1 December 1476, Château de Moulins), married Charles I, Duke of Bourbon

== Sources ==
- Stein, Robert (2017). Magnanimous Dukes and Rising States: The Unification of the Burgundian. Oxford University Press.
- Vaughan, Richard (2005). Philip the Bold: The Formation of the Burgundian State. The Boydell Press.
- Vaughan, Richard (2010). John the Fearless: The Growth of Burgundian Power. The Boydell Press.
- Ward, A.W.; Prothero, G.W.; Leathes, Stanley, eds. (1934). The Cambridge Modern History. Vol. XIII. Cambridge at the University Press.

Margaret of Bavaria House of Wittelsbach Born: 1363 Died: 23 January 1424
Royal titles
Preceded by Margaret III of Flanders	Duchess consort of Burgundy; 27 April 1404 – 10 September 1419	Succeeded by Michelle of Valois
