= Margaret of Burgundy, Duchess of Bavaria =

Margaret of Burgundy
- Duchess consort of Bavaria-Straubing; Countess consort of Mortain, Hainaut, Holland, and Zeeland
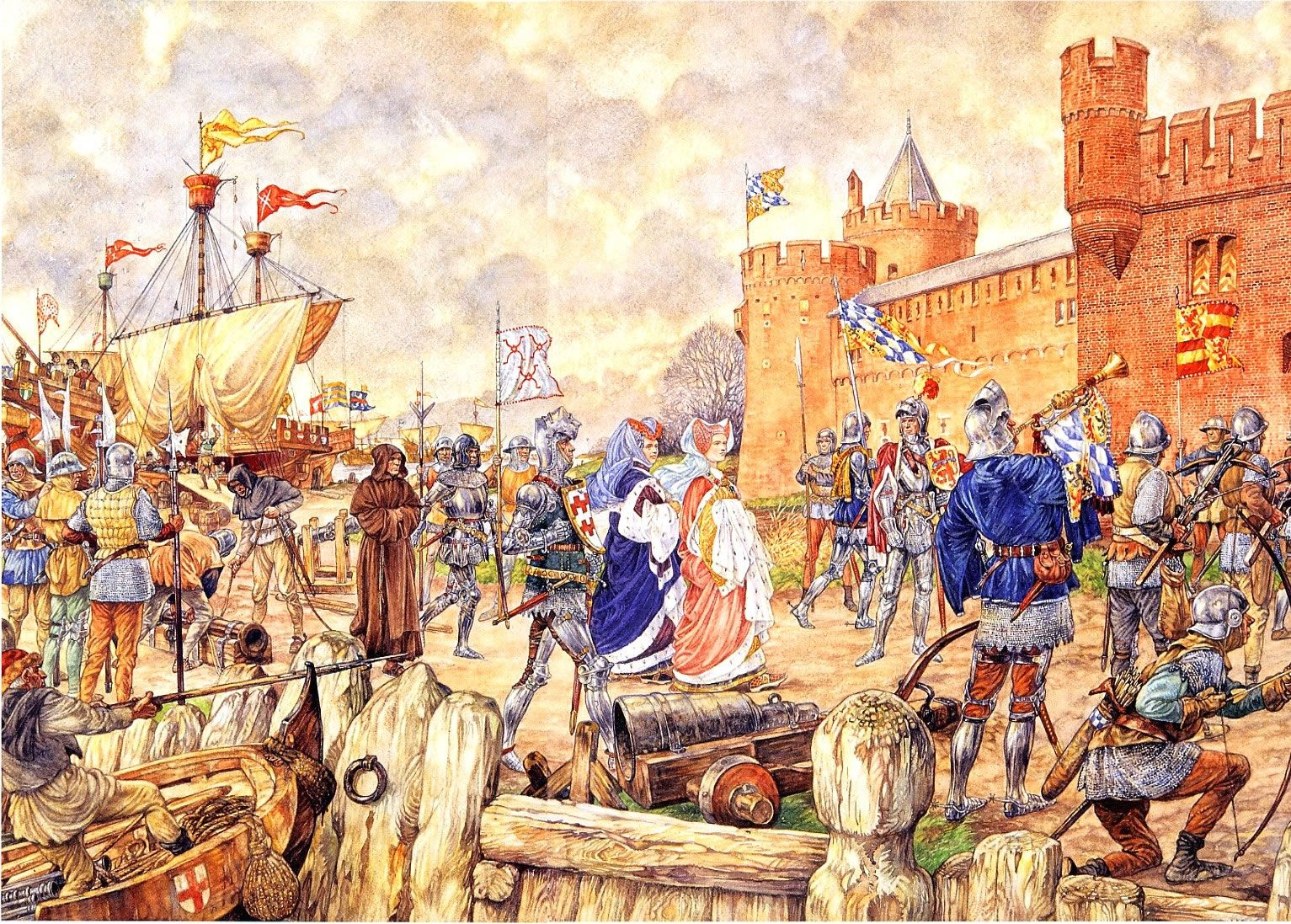
- Margaret of Burgundy, with her daughter, Jacqueline, at the Siege of Gorkum in 1417, during the Third Phase of the Hook and Cod wars
- Born: October 1374
- Died: 8 March 1441 (aged 66); Le Quesnoy
- Spouse: William II, Duke of Bavaria
- Issue: Jacqueline, Countess of Hainaut
- House: Valois-Burgundy
- Father: Philip II, Duke of Burgundy
- Mother: Margaret III, Countess of Flanders

Margaret of Burgundy (October 1374 – 8 March 1441) was Duchess of Bavaria as the wife of Duke William II. She acted as regent in Hainaut in the absence of her husband between 1404 and 1417.

== Life ==
Margaret was the third child and first daughter out of nine children born to Philip II, Duke of Burgundy, and Margaret III, Countess of Flanders. Margaret's father used the marriages of his children to achieve far-sighted goals. In keeping with this strategy, Margaret and her brother John were wedded in a double marriage to William of Bavaria and his sister Margaret. This marriage, celebrated on 12 April 1385 in Cambrai, would later influence the union of Hainaut and Holland with Burgundy and Flanders, as carried out by Margaret's nephew Philip the Good.

Margaret exerted a lot of political influence during the reign of her spouse: William ruled both Holland and Hainaut, but preferred Holland and spent a lot of his reign there. Margaret thus governed Hainaut in his name.

After 16 years of childless marriage, Margaret gave birth to a daughter, Jacqueline, on 16 August 1401. Margaret's political position increased in the 1410s, as she was granted several towns and castles as her personal fiefs.

William died in 1417 from an infection which developed after he was bitten by a dog. Although he and Margaret attempted to ensure that their daughter would inherit all his lands, a war of succession broke out after his death. Jacqueline would eventually come to inherit Hainaut, Holland, and Zeeland, but not Bavaria. During the reign of her daughter, Margaret was involved in several political acts. She preferred the Le Quesnoy castle as her residence, which was also her personal fief. She died at Le Quesnoy on 8 March 1441, having outlived her childless daughter.

== Ancestry ==
Ancestors of Margaret of Burgundy, Duchess of Bavaria

8. Philip VI of France
4. John II of France
9. Joan the Lame
2. Philip the Bold
10. John of Bohemia
5. Bonne of Bohemia
11. Elizabeth of Bohemia
1. Margaret of Burgundy
12. Louis I, Count of Flanders
6. Louis II, Count of Flanders
13. Margaret I, Countess of Burgundy
3. Margaret III, Countess of Flanders
14. John III, Duke of Brabant
7. Margaret of Brabant
15. Marie of Évreux
