= Philip the Bold =

Duke of Burgundy from 1363 to 1404

Philip II the Bold
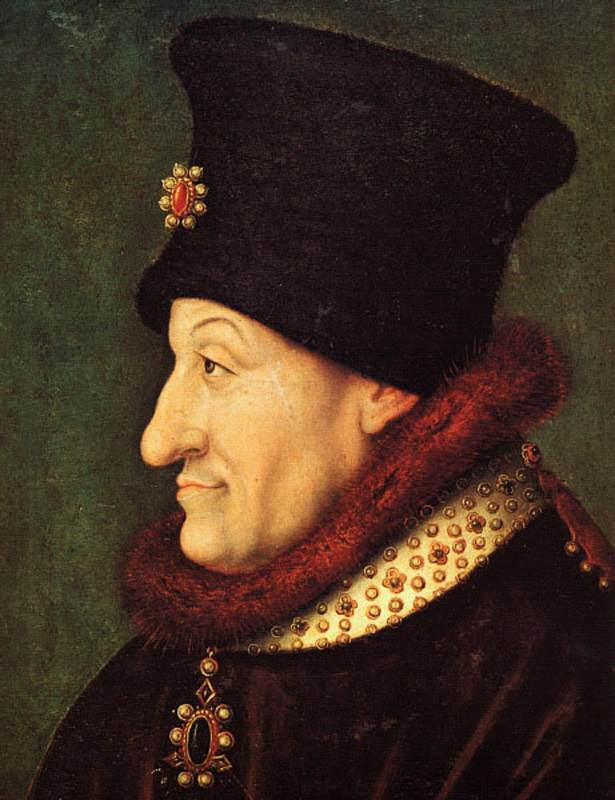
- Later copy of an early 15th-century portrait of Philip, possibly by Jean Malouel

Duke of Burgundy
- Reign: 6 September 1363 – 27 April 1404
- Predecessor: Philip I
- Successor: John the Fearless

Regent of France
- Regency: 1382–1388
- Monarch: Charles VI
- Co-Regent: John, Duke of Berry; Louis II, Duke of Bourbon
- Born: 17 January 1342; Pontoise, Kingdom of France
- Died: 27 April 1404 (aged 62); Halle, County of Hainaut
- Spouse: Margaret III of Flanders (m. 1369)
- Issue among others: John the Fearless; Margaret, Duchess of Bavaria; Mary, Duchess of Savoy; Anthony, Duke of Brabant; Philip II, Count of Nevers
- House: Valois-Burgundy
- Father: John II of France
- Mother: Bonne of Bohemia

Philip II the Bold (French: Philippe II le Hardi; Dutch: Filips de Stoute; 17 January 1342 – 27 April 1404) was Duke of Burgundy and jure uxoris Count of Flanders, Artois and Burgundy. He was the fourth and youngest son of King John II of France and Bonne of Luxembourg.

Philip was the founder of the Burgundian branch of the House of Valois. His vast collection of territories made him the undisputed premier peer of the Kingdom of France and made his successors formidable subjects, and later rivals, of the kings of France.

Philip played an important role in the development of gunpowder artillery in European warfare, making extensive and successful use of it in his military campaigns. By political marriage, from 1384 Philip gained control over Flanders, one of the wealthiest provinces of Europe in that time. He and his successors ruled it until 1482. This period is referred to as the Burgundian Netherlands.

== Early life ==
Philip was born in Pontoise in 1342 to John of Valois, the eldest son of King Philip VI of France, and Bonne of Luxembourg. His father became king of France in 1350. Philip became known as "the Bold" at the age of 14, when he fought beside his father at the Battle of Poitiers in 1356. They were captured during the battle by the English. Philip remained in custody with his father until the terms of their ransom were agreed to in the Treaty of Brétigny of 1360. He was created Duke of Touraine in 1360, but in 1363, he returned this duchy to the crown to receive instead the Duchy of Burgundy in apanage from his father as a reward for his courage at the Battle of Poitiers.

== Duke of Burgundy ==
Coat of arms (after 1363)

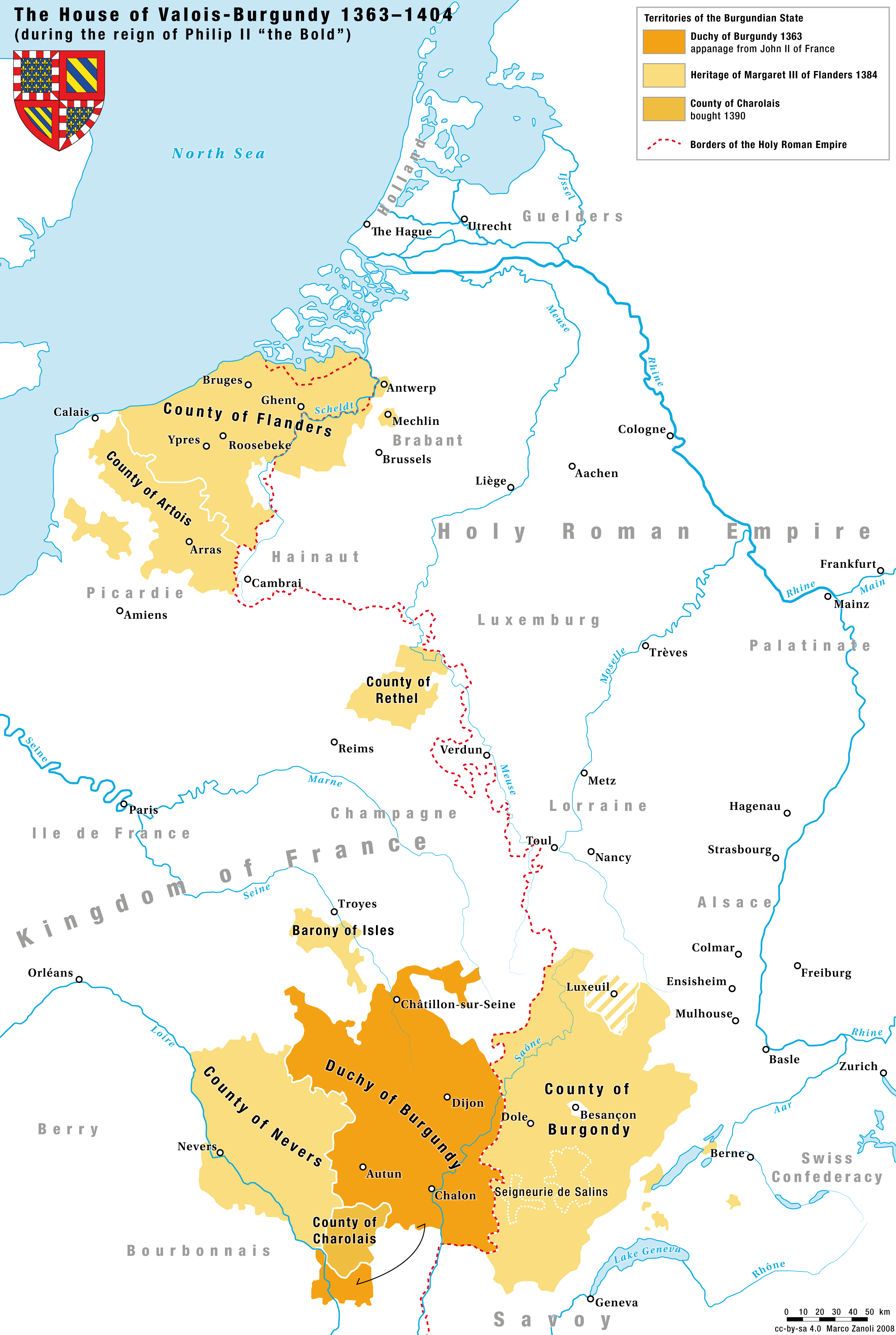
Map of the Burgundian state during the reign of Philip the Bold

On 19 June 1369, Philip married the 19-year-old Margaret, daughter of Count Louis II of Flanders, who in 1382 inherited the County of Flanders, the Duchy of Brabant, the County of Artois, and the Free County of Burgundy.

From 1379 to 1382, Philip helped his father-in-law Louis II put down revolts in Flanders, particularly in Ghent, by organising an army against Philip van Artevelde. The revolts were finally ended in 1385, following the death of Louis II, with the Peace of Tournai. As jure uxoris Count of Flanders, he would keep in mind the economic interests of the Flemish cities, which mainly made their money from weaving and spinning. He was aided in this by the expansion of the Three Members – a parliament consisting of representatives from the towns of Bruges, Ghent and Ypres – to the Four Members through the addition of the rural area Franc of Bruges.

In 1390, Philip also became the Count of Charolais, a title used by Philip the Good and Charles the Bold as the heirs of Burgundy.

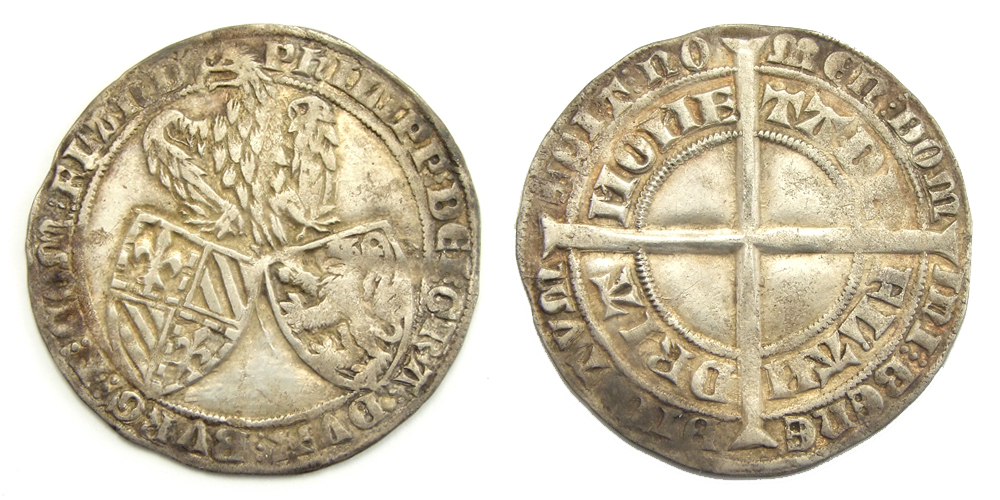
Flanders, double groat or jangelaar, struck in Ghent under Philip the Bold (1384–1404) with the arms of Burgundy and Flanders.

Philip was very active at the court of France, particularly after the death in 1380 of his brother King Charles V, whose successor Charles VI became king at the age of 11. During Charles' minority, a council of Regents was set up to govern France that was made up of four of his uncles: Louis, Duke of Anjou, John, Duke of Berry, and Philip himself from his father's side, and from his mother's side, Louis II, Duke of Bourbon. Among Philip's acts while regent was the suppression of a tax revolt in 1382 known as the Harelle. The regency lasted until 1388, always with Philip assuming the dominant role: Louis of Anjou spent much effort fighting for his claim to the Kingdom of Naples after 1382 and died in 1384, John of Berry was interested mainly in the Languedoc and not particularly interested in politics, and Louis II of Bourbon was largely an unimportant figure due to his personality (he showed signs of mental instability) and his status (since he was not the son of a king). However, Philip, along with John of Berry and Louis II of Bourbon, lost most of their power at court in 1388, when Charles VI chose to favour the advice of the Marmousets, his personal advisors, over that of his uncles when he attained his majority.

In 1392, events conspired to allow Philip to seize power once more in France. Charles VI's friend and advisor Olivier V de Clisson had recently been the target of an assassination attempt by agents of John IV, Duke of Brittany. The would-be assassin, Pierre de Craon, had taken refuge in Brittany. Charles, outraged at these events, determined to punish Craon, and on 1 July 1392 led an expedition against Brittany. While travelling to Brittany, the king, already overwrought by the slow progress, was shocked by a madman who spent half-an-hour following the procession to warn the king that he had been betrayed. When a page dropped a lance, the king reacted by killing several of his knights and had to be wrestled to the ground. Philip, who was present, immediately assumed command and appointed himself regent, dismissing Charles' advisors. He was the principal ruler of France until 1402.

His seizure of power, however, had disastrous consequences for the unity of the House of Valois and of France itself. The king's brother Louis I, Duke of Orléans, resented his uncle taking over as regent instead of himself; the result was a feud between Philip and Louis that continued after their deaths by their families. In particular, both quarreled over royal funds, which each desired to appropriate for his own ends: Louis to fund his extravagant lifestyle, Philip to further his expansionist ambitions in Burgundy and the Low Countries. This struggle only served to enhance the reputation of Philip, since he appeared to be a sober and honest reformer in comparison to the profligate and irresponsible Louis. Although Charles VI confirmed his brother as regent in 1402 in a rare moment of sanity, Louis's misrule allowed Philip to regain control of France as regent in 1404, shortly before his death.

In 1395, Philip the Bold outlawed cultivation of the Gamay grape in favour of Pinot Noir in an early example of agricultural regulation related to wine quality.

Philip died in Halle, County of Hainaut (modern Belgium), on 27 April 1404. His territories were bequeathed to his eldest son John the Fearless, who also inherited Philip's political position in France and the leadership of the Burgundian branch of the Valois family against the Orléans branch.

== Tomb ==
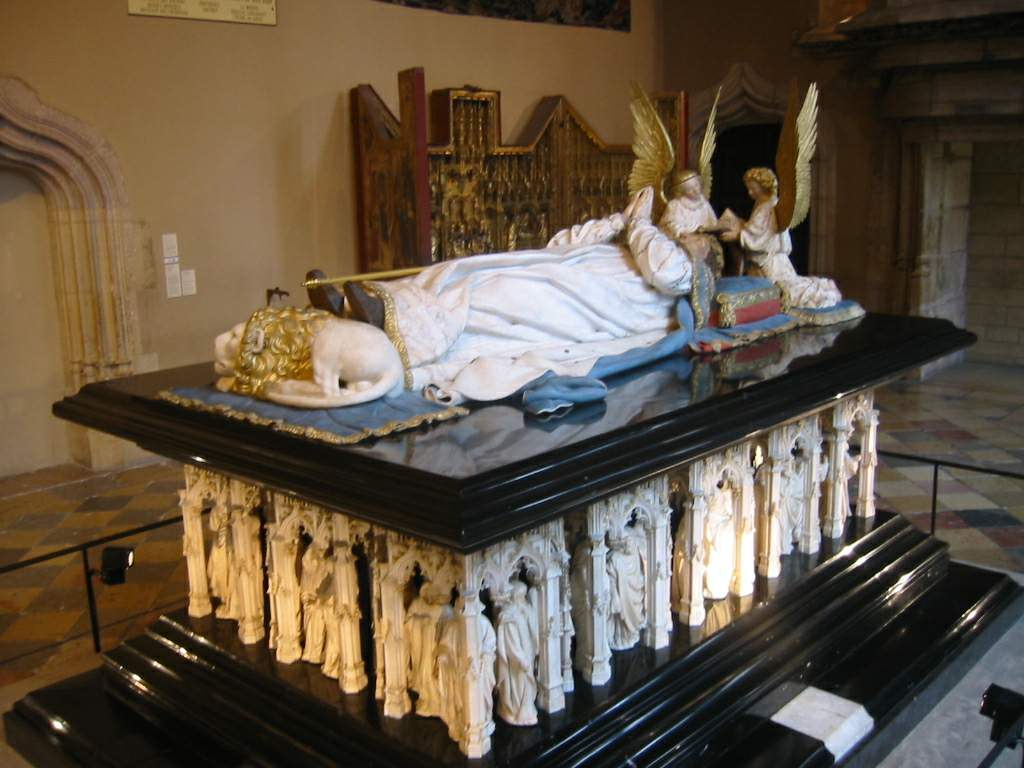
Tomb of Philip the Bold at the Palace of the Dukes of Burgundy at Dijon

In 1378, Philip the Bold acquired the domain of Champmol, just outside Dijon, to build the Chartreuse de Champmol (1383–1388), a Carthusian monastery ("Charterhouse"), which he intended to house the tombs of his dynasty. His tomb, with pleurants and his recumbent effigy, is an outstanding work of Burgundian sculpture. They were created by Jean de Marville (1381–1389), Claus Sluter (1389–1406) and Claus de Werve (1406–1410). Jean Malouel, official painter to the duke, was responsible for the polychrome and gilt decoration. After his death, the body of Philip the Bold was eviscerated and embalmed, then placed in a lead coffin. It was then deposited in the choir of Chartreuse de Champmol on 16 June 1404. His internal organs were sent to the church of Saint Martin at Halle. In 1792, his body was transferred to Dijon Cathedral, and in the following year, his tomb was damaged by revolutionaries and looters. It was restored in the first half of the 19th century and today it is in housed the former palace of the dukes, now part of the Musée des Beaux-Arts de Dijon.

== Marriage and issue ==
Philip the Bold married the future Countess Margaret III of Flanders on 19 June 1369, a marriage that would eventually reunite not only the Duchy of Burgundy with the Free County of Burgundy and the County of Artois, but also unite it to the rich County of Flanders. Philip and Margaret had the following children:

- John the Fearless (1371–1419, murdered at Montereau), his eldest son and successor as Duke of Burgundy
- Charles (1372–1373)
- Marguerite (October 1374 – 8 March 1441, Le Quesnoy), Countess of Mortain married William VI, Count of Holland and Duke of Bavaria-Straubing
- Louis (1377–1378)
- Catherine (April 1378, Montbard – 24 January 1425, Gray, Haute-Saône), married Leopold IV, Duke of Austria
- Bonne (1379–1399, Arras) betrothed to John I, Duke of Bourbon
- Antoine, Duke of Brabant (August 1384 – 25 October 1415, at Agincourt)
- Mary (September 1386, Dijon – 2 October 1422, Thonon-les-Bains), married Amadeus VIII, Duke of Savoy
- Philip II, Count of Nevers and Rethel (1389–1415, at Agincourt)

In arranging the marriages of his children, Philip followed an intelligent diplomatic and strategic design that would be followed by his successors in Burgundy as far as Emperor Maximilian I. For example, the double marriage in 1385 at Cambrai of his son, John the Fearless, and his daughter, Margaret, to Margaret of Bavaria and William of Bavaria, son and daughter of Albert, Count of Hainault and Holland, prepared the later union of Hainault and Holland with Burgundy and Flanders, as carried out by Philip's grandson, Philip the Good. The marriages also inserted the new Valois Burgundy dynasty into the Wittelsbach network of alliances: the other daughters of Count Albert married William I, Duke of Guelders and Wenceslaus, King of Bohemia; their cousin, Isabeau of Bavaria married Charles VI of France, and became Queen of France.

In addition to his alliance with the Netherlandish Bavarians, Philip also made links with the Dukes of Austria and of Savoy by marrying his daughter Catherine to Leopold IV of Austria and his daughter Mary to Amadeus VIII of Savoy.

== Residences ==
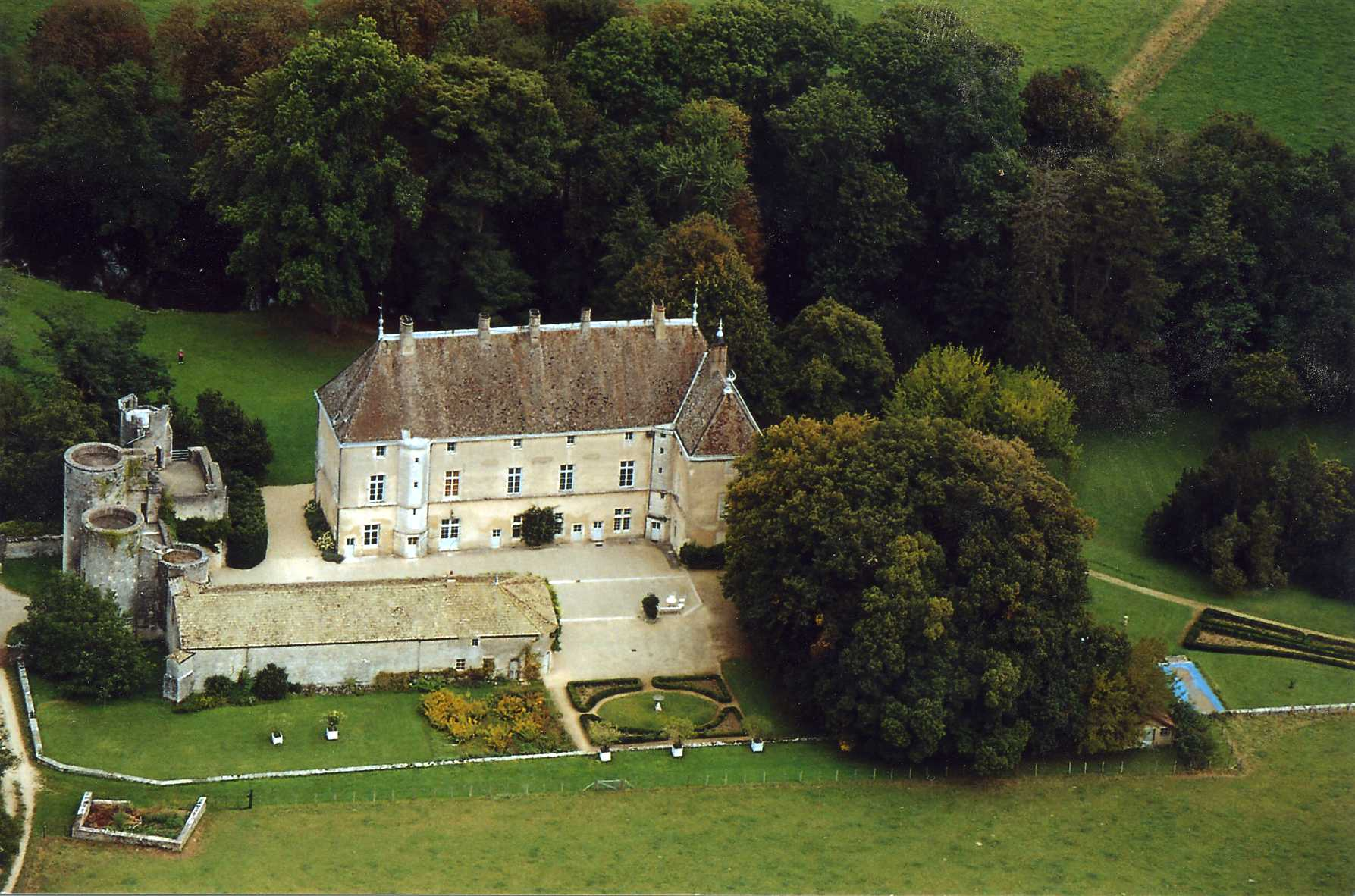
The Château de Germolles in Burgundy.

Few of Philip the Bold's residences are still extant. Apart from several elements of the ducal palace in Dijon (Tour de Bar), the Château de Germolles is largely preserved. This residence was offered to his wife, Margaret III, Countess of Flanders in 1381. The princess transformed the old fortress into a luxurious home with the help of artists from the Burgundian School Claus Sluter and Jean de Beaumetz.

== See also ==
- Duke of Burgundy#Family tree
- Guy II de Pontailler

== Sources ==
- Dominé, André (2000). Wine. Könemann.
- Hardy, Duncan (2017). "Burgundian clients in the south-western Holy Roman Empire, 1410-1477: Between international diplomacy and regional political culture". In Hennings, Jan; Sowerby, Tracey A. (eds.). Practices of Diplomacy in the Early Modern World C.1410-1800. Taylor & Francis. pp. 25–43. ISBN 9781351736916.
- Keane, Marguerite (2016). Material Culture and Queenship in 14th-century France: The Testament of Blanche of Navarre (1331–1398). Brill.
- Poupardin, René (1911). "Philip the Bold" . In Chisholm, Hugh (ed.). Encyclopædia Britannica. Vol. 21 (11th ed.). Cambridge University Press. p. 386.
- Rose, Susan (2013). The Wine Trade in Medieval Europe 1000-1500. Bloomsbury.
- Smith, Kay Douglas; Smith, Robert Douglas; DeVries, Kelly (2005). The Artillery of the Dukes of Burgundy, 1363-1477. Boydell Press. ISBN 978-1-84383-162-4.
- Vaughan, Richard (2009a). John the Fearless. The Boydell Press.
- Vaughan, Richard (2009b). Philip the Bold: The Formation of the Burgundian state. The Boydell Press.
- Vaughan, Richard (2010). Philip the Good: The Apogee of Burgundy. The Boydell Press.
- Villalon, Andrew; Kagay, Donald (2017). To Win and Lose a Medieval Battle: Nájera (April 3, 1367), A Pyrrhic Victory for the Black Prince. Brill.

- The Mourners: Tomb Sculptures from the Court of Burgundy

Philip the Bold House of Valois-Burgundy Cadet branch of the House of Valois Born: 15 January 1342 Died: 27 April 1404
Regnal titles
New title	Duke of Touraine; 1360–1363	Succeeded by Charles
Vacant Royal domain Title last held by Philip I	Duke of Burgundy; 1363–1404	Succeeded by John the Fearless
Preceded by Bernard	Count of Charolais; 1390–1404	Succeeded by John the Fearless
Preceded by Louis of Male	Count of Nevers; 1384 with Margaret	Succeeded by John the Fearless
Preceded by Louis of Male	Count Palatine of Burgundy; Count of Artois and Flanders; 1384–1404 with Margaret II & III	Succeeded by Margaret II & III as sole ruler
Preceded by Louis of Male	Count of Rethel; 1384–1402 with Margaret	Succeeded by Anthony
