= Margaret III of Flanders =

Countess of Flanders from 1384 to 1405

Margaret III
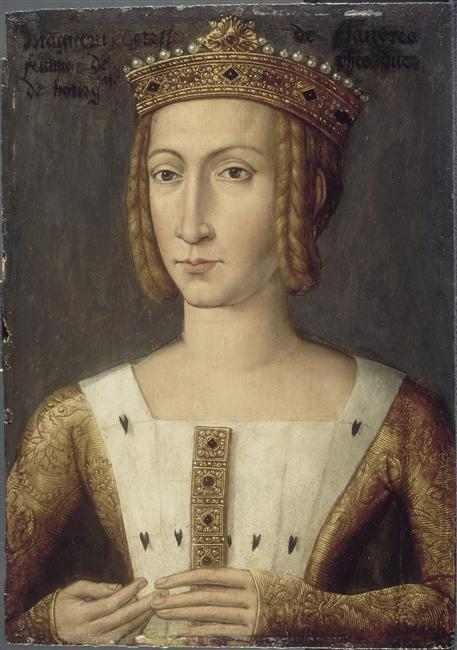
- 16th century anonymous painting of Margaret

Countess of Flanders
- Reign: 30 January 1384 – 16 March 1405
- Predecessor: Louis of Male
- Successor: John the Fearless

Duchess consort of Burgundy
- Tenure: 19 June 1369 – 27 April 1404
- Tenure: 14 May 1357 – 21 November 1361
- Born: 13 April 1350; Male Castle, West Flanders, Belgium
- Died: 16 March 1405 (aged 54); Arras, Artois, France.
- Spouses: Philip I, Duke of Burgundy (m. 1355; died 1361) Philip II, Duke of Burgundy (m. 1369; died 1404)
- Issue: John I, Duke of Burgundy; Margaret, Duchess of Bavaria; Catherine, Duchess of Austria; Bonne of Burgundy; Mary, Duchess of Savoy; Antoine, Duke of Brabant; Philip II, Count of Nevers
- House: Dampierre
- Father: Louis II, Count of Flanders
- Mother: Margaret of Brabant

Margaret III (13 April 1350 – 16/21 March 1405) was a ruling Countess of Flanders, Countess of Artois, and Countess of Auvergne and Boulogne between 1384 and 1405. She was the last ruler of Flanders of the House of Dampierre.

She was also Duchess consort of Burgundy by marriage to Dukes Philip I and Philip II of Burgundy.

== Biography ==
Margaret was the only surviving child and heir of Count Louis II of Flanders (1346–1384) and Margaret of Brabant.

=== First marriage ===
In 1355, Margaret of Flanders married Philip of Rouvres, grandson and heir of Odo IV, Duke of Burgundy. Philip was Count of Burgundy and Artois (1347–1361), Duke of Burgundy (1350–1361), and became Count of Auvergne and Boulogne (1360–1361).

=== Second marriage ===
Following Philip's death from a riding accident in 1361, Margaret was widowed and had no issue by him. King John II of France then claimed the Duchy of Burgundy for the Kingdom of France, by escheat. In 1363, Philip the Bold, King John's youngest son, was granted the duchy, and subsequently married Margaret. Margaret's second marriage to Philip the Bold took place in 1369.

=== Ruling Countess ===
When Margaret's father, the Count of Flanders, died in 1384, she and Philip inherited the counties of Artois, Burgundy, Flanders, Nevers, and Rethel. Philip died in 1404, and Margaret died the following year.

With her death, the House of Dampierre came to an end, and the County of Flanders lost its (relative) independence from Burgundy. It came under the rule of her son, John the Fearless (belongs to the House of Valois-Burgundy), and later to the House of Habsburg.

== Issue ==
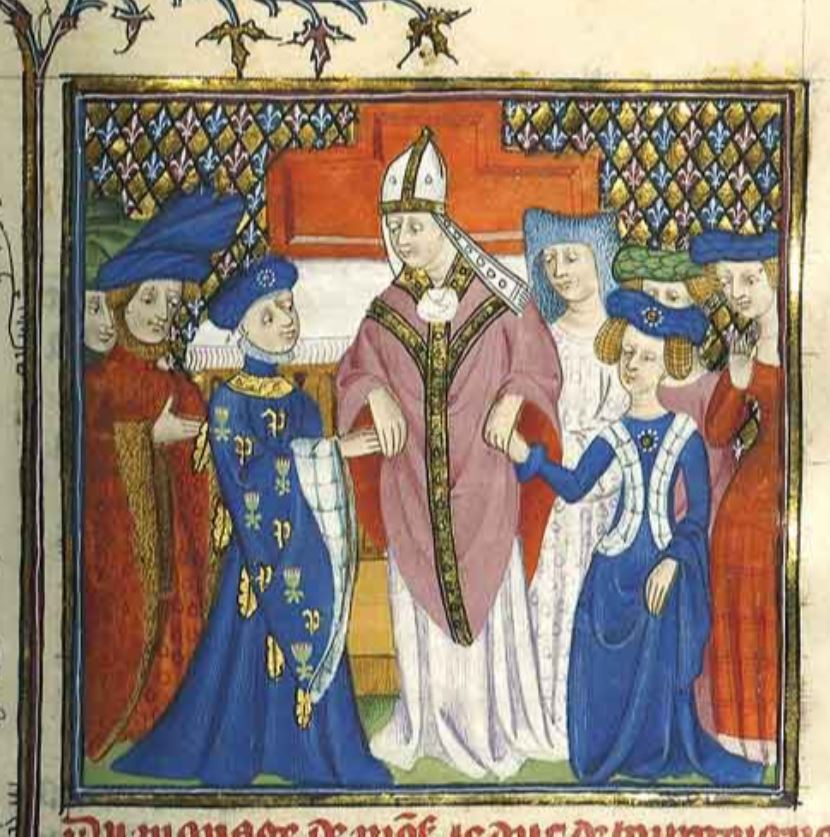
Miniature depicting the marriage of Philip and Margaret

Margaret and Philip had the following children:

- John I of Burgundy, Duke of Burgundy (1371, Palace of the Dukes of Burgundy, Dijon –1419, murdered at Montereau, Paris), her eldest son and successor in Flanders, Artois, and Burgundy.
- Charles of Burgundy (1372–1373)
- Margaret of Burgundy (October 1374 – March 8, 1441, Le Quesnoy), married William II, Duke of Bavaria.
- Louis of Burgundy (1377–1378)
- Catherine of Burgundy (April 1378, Montbard – January 24, 1425, Gray, Haute-Saône), married Leopold IV, Duke of Austria.
- Bonne of Burgundy (1379–1399, Arras)
- Mary of Burgundy (September 1380, Dijon – October 2, 1422, Thonon-les-Bains), married Amadeus VIII, Duke of Savoy
- Antoine of Burgundy, Duke of Brabant (August, 1384 – October 25, 1415, at the Battle of Agincourt.)
- Philip II, Count of Nevers and Rethel (1389–1415, at the Battle of Agincourt.), as "Philip II".

== Legacy ==
The main line of the House of Dampierre ended with Margaret III. The Dampierres, originally only counts of Flanders, had through a clever marriage policy managed to inherit the counties of Nevers (1280) and Rethel (1328). Through her grandmother, a daughter of King Philip V of France, the counties of Artois and Burgundy (the "Franche Comté") were added to this (1382). These lands were to provide the core of the dominions of the House of Valois-Burgundy, which were, together with the Duchy of Burgundy, to provide them with a power base to challenge the rule of their cousins, the Valois kings of France in the 15th century.

Her eldest son, John the Fearless, succeeded her father Louis as Count of Nevers in 1384, her husband in 1404 as Duke of Burgundy and as Count of Burgundy, Count of Artois, and Count of Flanders. In 1406 her younger son Anthony inherited Brabant and Limburg. Nevers and Rethel were at first, in her lifetime, given to her eldest sons John (Nevers) and Anthony (Rethel), but after John's accession to the duchy, Nevers went to her youngest son Philip. Rethel was given to Philip in 1402 when it became clear that Anthony would inherit Brabant.

== Residences ==
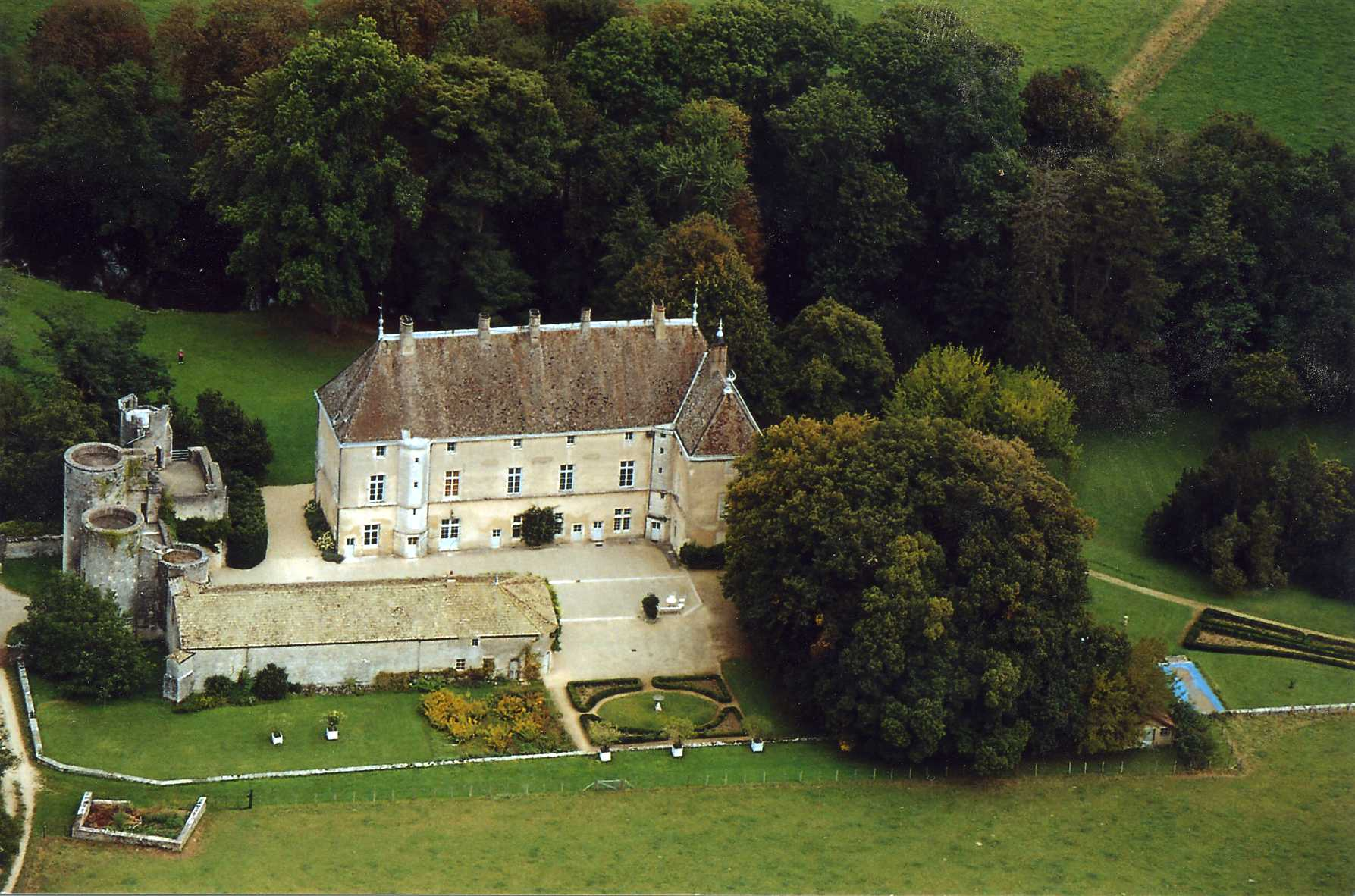
The Château de Germolles

In Burgundy, the Château de Germolles, offered to Margaret by Philip the Bold, was transformed by the Duchess consort of Burgundy into a sumptuous country estate. It was a large rectangular building, surrounded by a moat, that enclosed a courtyard. The south and east wings contained the living apartments, while the west wing held the reception rooms. Margaret, being energetic and a country lover, decided to develop at the estate some rustic activities that would create a pleasant environment around this favourite residence of hers, as well as developing local agriculture and providing some income for the maintenance of the domain. Thus, she planted a large rose garden, and the petals were sent to Flanders to be used to make rose water. In 1390, Margaret and Philip hosted King Charles VI of France at the Château.

Largely preserved, the Château is today one of the best examples of the princely residences in France at the end of the Middle Ages.

== Sources ==
- Bauer-Smith, Charlotte (2004). "Mapping Family Lines: A Late Fifteenth Century Example of Genealogical Display". In Biggs, Douglas L.; Michalove, Sharon D.; Reeves, Albert Compton (eds.). Reputation and Representation in Fifteenth Century Europe. Brill.
- Blockmans, Wim; Prevenier, Walter (1999). Peters, Edward (ed.). The Promised Lands: The Low Countries Under Burgundian Rule, 1369-1530. Translated by Fackelman, Elizabeth. University of Pennsylvania Press.
- Boffa, Sergio (2004). Warfare in Medieval Brabant, 1356-1406. Boydell & Brewer.
- Goehring, Margaret (2020). "The Politics of Space of the Burgundian Garden". In Enenkel, Karl A.E.; Melion, Walter (eds.). Landscape and the Visual Hermeneutics of Place, 1500–1700. Brill. pp. 326–366. ISBN 9789004440401.
- Nicholas, David M (1992). Medieval Flanders. Routledge.
- Nolan, Cathal J. (2006). "Duchy of Burgundy". The Age of Wars of Religion, 1000-1650: An Encyclopedia of Global Warfare and Civilization. Vol. 1. Greenwood Publishing.
- Normore, Christina (2015). A Feast for the Eyes: Art, Performance, and the Late Medieval Banquet. University of Chicago Press. ISBN 9780226242347.
- Ormrod, W. Mark (2011). Edward III. Yale University Press.
- Vaughan, Richard (2005). Philip the Bold: The Formation of the Burgundian State. The Boydell Press.

Margaret III of Flanders House of Dampierre Born: 13 April 1350 Died: 21 March 1405
Regnal titles
Preceded by Louis of Mâle	Countess of Flanders, Artois and Nevers; Countess Palatine of Burgundy; 1384–1405	Succeeded by John the Fearless
Preceded by Louis of Mâle	Countess of Rethel; 1384–1402	Succeeded by Anthony
