= Battle of Le Quesnoy =

Battle of Le Quesnoy may refer to:

- Battle of Le Quesnoy (1568), during the Eighty Years' War
- Capture of Le Quesnoy (1918), during the First World War

== See also ==
- Siege of Le Quesnoy (disambiguation)
