= Siege of Le Quesnoy =

Siege of Le Quesnoy or capture of Le Quesnoy may refer to:

- Siege of Le Quesnoy (1793), successful siege of a French city by the First Coalition
- Siege of Le Quesnoy (1794), successful siege of a Coalition-held city by the French
- Capture of Le Quesnoy (1918), successful capture of a German-held city by the Entente

== See also ==
- Battle of Le Quesnoy (disambiguation)
