= Le Quesnoy =

- Commune
- The town hall

- Coat of arms
- Location of Le Quesnoy
- Location within France Location within Hauts-de-France
- Coordinates: 50°14′59″N 3°38′18″E
- Country: France
- Region: Hauts-de-France
- Department: Nord
- Arrondissement: Avesnes-sur-Helpe
- Canton: Avesnes-sur-Helpe
- Intercommunality: Pays de Mormal

Government
  - Mayor (2020–2026): Marie-Sophie Lesne
- Area^{1}: 14.23 km^{2} (5.49 sq mi)
- Elevation: 125 m (410 ft)
- Highest elevation: 138 m (453 ft)
- Lowest elevation: 82 m (269 ft)
- Population (2023): 4,878
  - Density: 342.8/km^{2} (887.8/sq mi)
- Time zone: UTC+01:00 (CET)
  - Summer (DST): UTC+02:00 (CEST)
- INSEE/Postal code: 59481 /59530
- ^{1} French Land Register data, which excludes lakes, ponds, glaciers > 1 km^{2} (0.386 sq mi or 247 acres) and river estuaries.

Le Quesnoy (French pronunciation: [lə kenwa]; Picard: L' Kénoé) is a commune and small town in the east of the Nord department of northern France. It was part of the historical province of French Hainaut. It is known for its fortifications, dating from the 16th, 17th and 18th centuries. It had a significant shoemaking industry before the late 1940s, followed by a chemical factory and dairy, giving way to its weekly market, tourism, local commuting to elsewhere such as Valenciennes and local shops.

Le Quesnoy's inhabitants are known as Quercitains.

== Economy ==
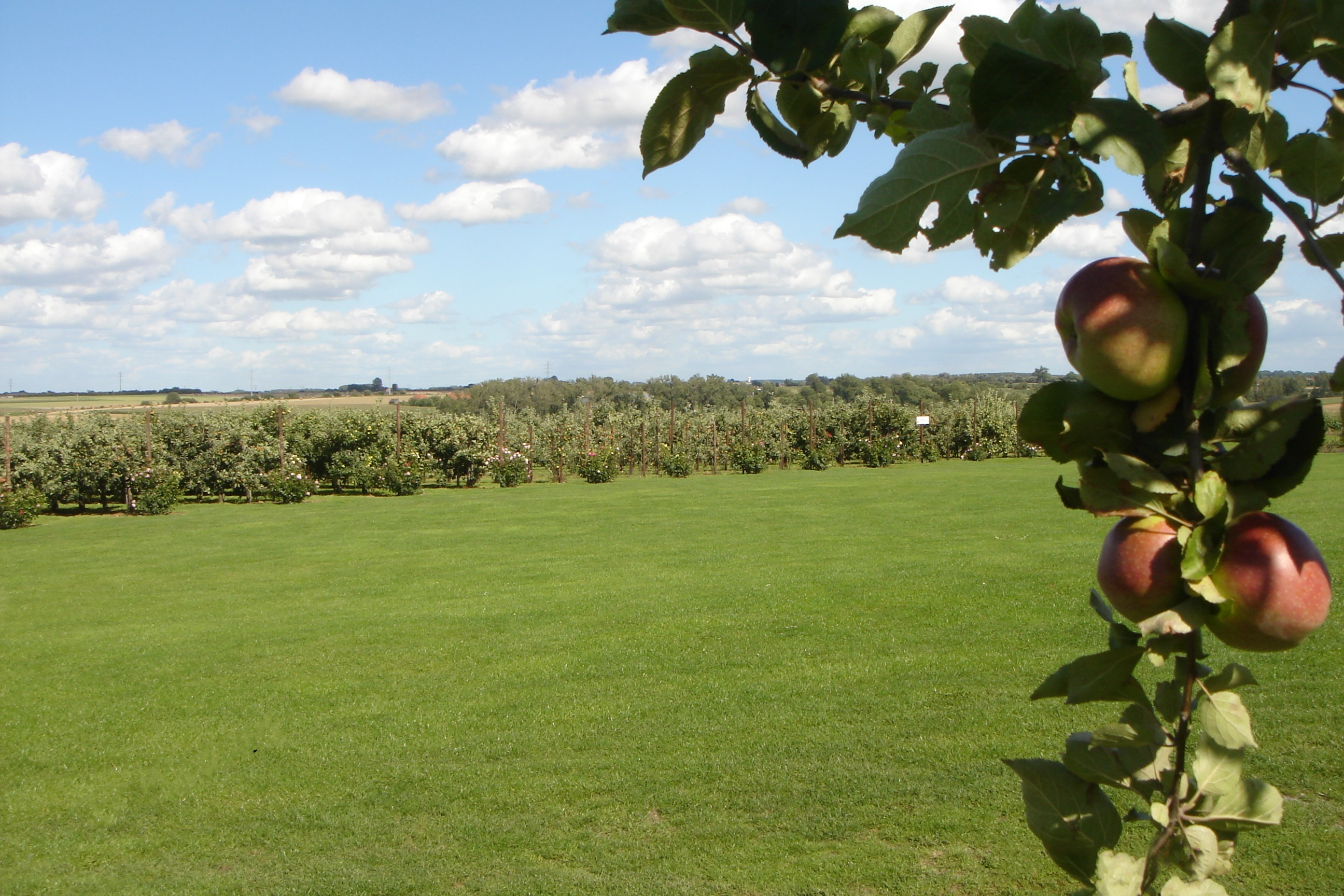
Orchard of Avesnois

The town of Le Quesnoy did not experience much change during the Industrial Revolution. Unlike the neighboring towns of Valenciennes or Maubeuge, iron/steel works did not take hold. The lack of wealth underground and of a major transportation route partly explains this. The authorities, however, took note of this weakness and proposed the Ecaillon canal from Sambre to Scheldt; considered but abandoned because of low water yield in the forest of Mormal.

Shoemaking was a major local industry until at least 1945, when a hundred shoemakers were still identifiable. Shoemakers worked at home for a local company (now Désiré Tanis) in rue du Petit Valenciennes in a kind of cottage industry. A glassmaking factory installed near the railway track on the site of the former Intermarché collapsed after World War I. In the Bellevue district, the remains of a factory attest to the presence of a former pottery factory.

The post-war boom or 'trentes glorieuses' saw industrial development on the outskirts of the town, including the chemical company (Cofradec) and food (Laiterie des 4 Cantons) inaugurated by Charles de Gaulle in 1959.

Today, economic activity is mainly based on tourism and local shops. The town with its ramparts, castle ponds and history (including the Revolutionary Armed bivouac and the New Zealanders Monument on the border of Valenciennes) are major attractions. Le Quesnoy is home to many small traders and has a trading area of more than respectable size for a town of less than 5,000 people. The closure of industrial enterprises (Cofradec, Duarte, dairy products) and services (transport) remains problematic, although there have been some new sources of work such as with the Emig company.

The town holds a weekly market on Friday mornings.

== Toponymy ==
Le Quesnoy is first attested in forms accompanied by the Latinized name of its alleged founder, called Haymon or Aymond: Haymon Quercitum (from the Latin quercus, "oak", a Latin term never imposed in Gaul). It appeared as Caisnetum in romanized charters to try to match the Picard language of the 11th to 14th century and as Haismont-Caisnoit, Le Kaisnoit, Le Caisnoy, Caisnoit and Quesnoyt in property titles of the same period (surveys of Hainaut of Cambrai, and Condé).

Quenoy is the Picard equivalent of existing alternate French chênaie. Picard, to the north of the northern Joret line, the group / ca-/ Latin has not evolved as in French quena, formerly Caisne, then Duquesne, "oak", came from the Latin cassinus and may be linked to Fraxinus ("ash") of Gallic origin*Cassano. The suffix -oy is the form taken by the Latin suffix -etu(m) in Picard dialect which covers some of northern France and Belgium a few instances elsewhere in the Langue d'oïl etu-(m). This suffix is used to denote a set of trees belonging to the same species.

== Population ==
Historical population

Year	Pop.	±% p.a.
1793	3,200	—
1800	2,960	−1.11%
1806	3,624	+3.43%
1821	3,320	−0.58%
1831	3,191	−0.40%
1836	3,281	+0.56%
1841	3,922	+3.63%
1846	3,551	−1.97%
1851	3,531	−0.11%
1856	3,948	+2.26%
1861	3,758	−0.98%
1866	3,346	−2.30%
1872	3,569	+1.08%
1876	3,692	+0.85%
1881	4,030	+1.77%
1886	3,765	−1.35%
1891	3,844	+0.42%
1896	3,872	+0.15%
1901	3,880	+0.04%

Year	Pop.	±% p.a.
1906	3,941	+0.31%
1911	3,857	−0.43%
1921	3,223	−1.78%
1926	3,346	+0.75%
1931	3,268	−0.47%
1936	3,500	+1.38%
1946	3,229	−0.80%
1954	3,592	+1.34%
1962	4,570	+3.06%
1968	5,101	+1.85%
1975	5,127	+0.07%
1982	4,792	−0.96%
1990	4,890	+0.25%
1999	4,919	+0.07%
2007	5,061	+0.36%
2012	5,030	−0.12%
2017	4,934	−0.38%
2023	4,878	−0.19%

Source: EHESS and INSEE

== History ==
=== Middle Ages ===
==== The origin of the town walls ====
While not yet a town at the time of Julius Caesar, the region was occupied by the Nerviens.
Near the Fauroeulx gate of the town in 1933, Roman pottery was discovered. Under the Merovingian and Carolingian, we find no evidence of a major population centre in the vicinity. However, the historian Jacques de Guise, claims that at that time the town was founded by a brave knight named Aymond, who lived around the year 800: "This Aymond was Count of Faumars (Famars) and Ardennes, also by his loyalty to the king, he and all four sons tended the deep wood, where they made a fortress and a place called Carcetus, Le Quesnoy. The legendary story of the epic by Renaud of Montauban "the horse Bayard and the four Aymond sons" is still known today from the Ardennes forest to the forest of Orleans."

Despite this assertion, the historian Valenciennes d’Oultreman said he could be a character named Aymon: governor of Ponthieu? Furthermore, the historian Jules Duvivier would rather name an ancient Count of Hainaut: indeed, in the 8th century, portions of territories around the present town belonged to the Leudes, fellows of the Frankish kings to whom they were granted. In the 9th century, the region was occupied by the Vikings who settled there along rivers. Around the year 842 at the time of King Charles the Bald, they were blocked at Valenciennes, as the river became too narrow for their boats. Later, the land at Le Queroy became a freehold belonging to the Episcopal mass at Cambrai and by the name ofNoflus, latinized from Novem fluctibus. Finally, 1148, the freehold was sold by the Bishop of Cambrai, Nicolas de Chièvres to Count Baldwin IV of Hainaut.

==== Baldwin IV, Count of Hainaut ====
In the mid-twelfth century, Count of Hainaut Baldwin IV the builder surrounded the town of Quesnoy with ditches and ramparts and also built in 1150 the castle which became an important the center of the fortifications of the town (now the Centre Cernay and the fire station).
This castle had a tower which together with the rest make up a fortress. Alice of Namur, wife of Baldwin IV endowed the castle with a chapel dedicated to St. John the Baptist. The castle had a park called "Bois du Gard" in which encountered deer, fallow deer and wild game. The park extended to the southeast (to Beaudignies and the edge of it is met with a mill near wetlands known as "the Pond du Gard". Desiring to populate his new fortified town, the Count enacted in 1161 a charter granting privileges to many people: the town prospered and there embraced a ... Mayor, aldermen, men of fiefs, (lawyers), a hostel, a hospital and outside, a leper to accommodate lepers (the disease of leprosy had been reported by the Crusaders from the East). Baldwin and his wife were still living, according to the scrolls, in 1169 in Le Quesnoy. The son of the Count (later Baldwin V, Count of Hainaut) married the said year 1169 in Le Quesnoy Margaret of Alsace, sister of Thierry of Alsace Count of Flanders: the wedding was gorgeous and the Holy Roman Emperor Frederick Barbarossa was present in person.

==== Baldwin V, Count of Hainaut ====
Baldwin V of Hainaut inherited in 1171 the title of Count of Hainaut in the death of his father, he was nicknamed The Brave (he was also later Baldwin VIII of Flanders). The new count, however, preferred to remain in Valenciennes rather than Le Quesnoy. In 1184, the count had to struggle against a coalition from the sire of Avesnes, the Count of Brabant and his brother the Count of Flanders : the Hainaut was ravaged on all sides. Unable to defend Le Quesnoy, the Count of Hainaut, with the consent of the inhabitants, burned the town so the attackers could not occupy it: the Quercitains took refuge in their castle and victoriously resisted the assaults of the Count of Flanders.
During the siege, Baldwin V, Count of Hainaut was in Mons, collecting and concentrating his troops. The Count of Flanders then came to the ramparts of Mons to try to take the town: it resisted. It was the same for the town of Maubeuge.
Meanwhile, at Le Quesnoy, the Lord of Trazegnies who commanded the garrison made a sortie and surprised the Flemish in their camp at Viesly. Peace between the warring parties finally intervened. Le Quesnoy rose from its ruins and became the favorite residence of the Counts of Hainaut who indulged in hunting and maintained a brilliant court. From 1194, Count Baldwin V settled permanently in Le Quesnoy. That same year, Pierre Pitens, the Count's chaplain, founded a small hospital that was equipped with incomes of land: the hospital will be the source of the Abbey of St. Elizabeth, Le Quesnoy (in rue Achille-Carlier in the town) that occupant came from the Augustinian Abbey Prémy near Cambrai.

==== Baldwin VI, Count of Hainaut ====
Baldwin VI of Hainaut nicknamed of Constantinople (he was also Baudouin IX Count of Flanders) succeeded in 1195 the title of Count of Hainaut following the death of his father. Born in Valenciennes in 1171, he later married Marie of Champagne, niece of the King of France — at that time there were very close links with France. Philip II of France, King of France, married Isabella of Hainaut, sister of Baldwin VI. It also brought together in his hands the county of Flanders. In 1200, he took the cross (left on a Crusade) and left the regency of his dominions to his brother Philip of Namur, his uncle William and Bouchard IV of Avesnes (tutor to his youngest daughter Margaret II of Flanders). Later he was elected by the Crusaders Emperor of Constantinople, but was captured in 1205 by the Greek allies to the Bulgarians: he never reappeared. He left two daughters, Jeanne and Marguerite P. Abbot.

==== Joan, Countess of Flanders ====
With no trace of her father Baldwin VI since the year 1205 his eldest daughter, Joan of Flanders (also known as Joan de Constantinople), heiress of Flanders and Hainaut, took the reins of both states: in 1211 she married her cousin Ferdinand of Portugal (choice proposed by the King of France, her uncle) who became through her Count of Flanders. But Flanders was allied with the English and the Germans: there followed a war with the King of France and Joan's husband was taken prisoner until 1227. Joan, who lived in Le Quesnoy castle since her marriage, held various meetings with key figures in the town. However she left the town in 1225, as a minstrel-adventurer, Bertrand de Rays, living in the woods of Glançon, pretended to be her father and intended to retake his land. In 1233, she returned and did improve the hospital in the town founded by Peter Pitens, enlarged the castle (the high Watchtower). Under the castle, extended the cellars and passages that still exist today. Her husband died in 1233 and in 1237 she married a second husband, Thomas of Savoy, who became a benefactor of Le Quesnoy. This served incidentally to improve the breeds of the country by bringing in bulls of Savoy and of Messin. He also brought horses from Italy and Spain, sheep from Catalonia, which yielded fine highly regarded wool, imbuing the drapers of Le Quesnoy with great renown: they mixed them with silk to make fabrics called Sayette. The cloth industry, widespread in Flanders, was also located in the town of Le Quesnoy.

==== Margaret II of Flanders ====
In 1244, the death of her older sister who had no offspring, Marguerite of Hainaut and of Flanders (also known as Margaret of Constantinople as second daughter of Baldwin VI of Hainaut) inherited Flanders and Hainaut. She was nicknamed the Black for her dishonorable conduct. From her first marriage in Le Quesnoy in 1212, with Bouchard Avesnes, her teacher she had chosen herself, she had two surviving sons, John and Baldwin of Avesnes. She divorced, for reasons unknown (Bouchard belonged, however, to English stock) and married again in 1223, a knight of Champagne, Guillaume de Dampierre who gave her three sons, and she tried to help (them) by bequest and inheritance: what proved the origin of a quarrel that engulfed Hainaut and Flanders. Louis IX of France, King of France, was called to serve as arbitrator: the king, after taking advice, apportioned Flanders to the Dampierres and Hainaut to the Avesnes. However, despite this wise decision, fighting continued between members of two families. In Le Quesnoy and its environs Margaret Hainaut had, in addition to land, a wealth of manorial rights: duties on goods brought to the market, rights on meat and beer sold, rights over the entry and exit of goods; rights over the number of the mills and ovens, rights over products of rivers etc. She preferred to lease it all through an annual fee: between 1274 and 1277, a citizen of Le Quesnoy called Clarembault settled an annual fee of 2925 pounds. Also, a cartulary of the said Margaret tells us that in Le Quesnoy at that time there were about six hundred properties, and they measured up to 33m long and 13m wide on the road; there were nine bread ovens in the town that residents were subjected to forced labor, such as to provide firewood to the castle, but in return, they could collect dead wood; in case of war the call to Quercitains would be twenty-four hours after that to the Valenciennes.

==== John I of Avesnes ====
In 1279, John I of Hainaut (or John II of Avesnes), son of another John and Margaret of Holland, son and grandson of Margaret II of Flanders, acceded to the County of Hainaut following the death of his grandmother. He preferred to live in Mons rather than in Le Quesnoy. In perpetual struggle against the Dampierres, he could not so much as collect additional taxes on his middle classes, that they, in desperation, seeing their industries decline, appealed to the Count of Flanders, Dampierre. A truce was concluded on 14 October 1292 through the intervention of the Duke John I of Brabant who was given custody of Le Quesnoy castle, until the conclusion of a peace treaty: the treaty became effective in 1297. But John made the people who had previously dared to make an appeal against him to the Count of Flanders regret their behaviour: many citizens of Hainaut were imprisoned and died in the castle vaults of Le Quesnoy. Drapers and weavers of (with their jobs and know-how) started to flee Le Quesnoy even before 1292, we find some settled in the city of Reims in Champagne. John who did not like Le Quenoy, offered it in 1301 by will to his son Raoul de Clermont, Constable of France. He, however, was killed in 1302 in battle of Courtrai. He then left the town in appanage to Gauthier, lord of Enghien and to Jacques de Verchain Seneschal of Hainaut, provided that if his wife Philippa of Luxembourg survived him, the town and its revenues should revert to him, she was widowed in 1304 and it actually reverted to John that year.

==== William I, Count of Hainaut ====
In 1304, William I, the second son of John Avesnes, succeeded his father and took the title of Count of Hainaut: he was nicknamed the Good and married, on 19 May 1305, Joan of Valois (1294-1352), sister of the king of France, Philip VI of France: The couple lived in Le Quesnoy frequently. The count in 1314, improved and strengthened the fortifications and, in 1318, in order to promote trade, he allowed wealthy Lombard bankers to settle in the town. In 1327 Philippa of Hainault, his was asked for her hand in marriage by King Edward III of England: the marriage was celebrated in 1328 in York, (England). At that time, William of Hainault had an excellent relationship with Flanders, England and France.

==== William II, Count of Hainaut ====
In 1337, William II the Hardy, succeeded his father as Count of Hainault. The Hundred Years War began and being a vassal state of the Holy Roman Empire, the Count was led to take sides with the Flemish and the King of England against France, despite the family ties binding it to the latter. Therefore, 22 May 1340, Le Quesnoy was besieged by John, Duke of Normandy (son of Philip VI of France with the royal troops; the Duke and his father did not accept that Count of Hainaut had rallied to the English. The inhabitants of the town defended themselves. Fortunately, they were well equipped with soldiers, weapons and artillery they had previously equipped the town walls with cannon ("batons of fire"), machinery and small cannons mounted on carriages which were used against the French attackers led by Marshal Mirepoix. The "Chronicles of Jean Froissart" mention the siege as follows: "(1340) .. Those of the town (= the besieged Le Quesnoy) unleashed against them (= the French troops) guns and machinery that threw large paving tiles. These tiles were generally made of iron, but could also be made of stone and tourniquets fire as they could find at very short notice in places under siege. The horses of the attackers were scared by the noise of the artillery which scattered iron and stone projectiles against them that could cause serious injury (equally to the riders), so they in this case against such weapons had no choice but to withdraw. The French, angry at having been repulsed by the artillery of the town, moved out of spite on the surrounding villages, which they then burned such as Gommegnies, Frasnoy, Château de Potelle, Wargnies-le-Grand, Wargnies-le-Petit.. (Notes 1.) Historians speak of the war machines without surprise, because they were more embarrassing than effective, and that no one foresaw the revolution that would make the discovery of gunpowder. In Europe around the year 1326 in Italy the first weapons loaded with powder were encountered. 2.) This siege is also interesting by the fact that there was no hand to hand combat and a new conception of the war by means of firearms was about to emerge : Artillery will quickly become indispensable to all wars and/or sieges.)"

==== Margaret II, Countess of Hainault ====
Margaret, in 1345, succeeded following the death in Friesland of her brother William II. In 1345, she granted to foreigners, of whichever countries they might be, the faculty to enjoy the same rights as residents of Le Quesnoy provided that they fix their residence in the town. She married Louis IV, Holy Roman Emperor became a widow of her husband in 1347: when she moved to Le Quesnoy where she stayed until the end of her life, and made the castle her preferred home. The cloth industry flourished there at that time: indeed, when the cloth industry of Mons was reorganized in 1352 it called upon clothmaking specialists of Le Quesnoy and a fuller was even called to settle in Mons with his working material.

==== William I, Duke of Bavaria and the regent Albert of Holland ====
On the death of his mother Margaret in 1356, William became Count William III of Hainault and William V of Holland. But returning from a trip to England in 1358, he was suffering from madness and initially to prevent harm, was imprisoned in The Hague, then in the tower of the Castle of Le Quesnoy, in which he remained for more than twenty years. His brother, Albert, Duke of Bavaria, secured the regency of his States, pending the majority of his son William VI, Count of Holland. Albert of Bavaria did not entertain good relations with particular subjects of Hainaut, he arrested Sir Sohier of Enghien at a banquet and locked him in Le Quesnoy, for causing him umbrage. The peers of Hainaut protested and petitioned the lord of Ligne: in reply, the Duke beheaded the lord of Enghien and seized his lands. In 1365, civil war sparked in Hainaut, which was ended in 1376, by the promise of Albert of Bavaria to found a mass in the church of Le Quesnoy dedicated to the repose of the soul of the lord executed, as well as providing monetary compensation for his orphans.

==== William II, Duke of Bavaria-Straubing and Margaret of Burgundy ====
The good relationship between the young William II (Count William IV of Hainault) and the bourgeois is Le Quesnoy resulted in the rapid construction of beautiful round towers surrounding the town (partially destroyed in the 16th Century on the construction of the new walls). In 1405 he reached his majority and was nicknamed the Good. He was married first wife, Mary, daughter of the King of France, Charles V. His marriage was barren so he contracted a new alliance (12 April 1385) with Margaret, daughter of Philip the Bold, known for this reason, in the history of Le Quesnoy by the name of Margaret of Burgundy. Margaret stood out throughout her life by her good works, and moreover, she had to take an important role in the town. During his reign, William IV granted many privileges including to the bowmen of Le Quesnoy. Le Quesnoy reached its peak of power and fame. The town was well protected and supplied, and was able to sell to the towns of the Somme and others darts, crossbows and guns.

==== Jacqueline, Countess of Hainaut ====
In 1417, Jacqueline, born in Le Quesnoy in 1401, succeeded to the title of Countess of Hainaut, following the death of her father William IV. She was nicknamed The Woman with four husbands as she had an eventful life: the cause of much pain for the town, Hainaut and the other states under her authority. Betrothed at 22 months and at five years to John, Dauphin of France (1398-1417), second son of King Charles VI of France, she would become widowed in 1417. From that time, Jacqueline lived with her mother in the castle. A year later, she married her cousin John IV, Duke of Brabant: the couple did not get along. In 1421, under the pretext of a trip to Bouchain she went to England whose court received her with respect and without waiting for the annulment by the Pope of her marriage to the Duke of Brabant, married Humphrey, Duke of Gloucester, brother of King Henry V of England. This was the beginning of a new war: Gloucester and Brabant each claiming their right to rule the territories of Jacqueline. One misfortune often leads to another; and in 1423, the towns of the provost of Le Quesnoy were not spared by the battles between the Armagnacs and the Burgundians: and were spoiled by bands such as "thieves de Guise", and "thieves and brigands of all kinds". In 1424, the town, which since 1420 had lost some of its rights, such as the hereditary bailiwick of the Vénerie stood up against the Duke of Brabant, permitting Humphrey, Duke of Gloucester to occupy the country. Jacqueline directed her governance of Le Quesnoy until 1425. Given the extent of the events caused by her third marriage, she left Le Quesnoy and took refuge in Mons, where she was captured and taken to the home of her cousin Philip the Good, Duke of Burgundy in Ghent, which again she escaped. She continued the fight and became victorious: the Duke of Brabant (her second husband) died in 1427. However, her territories declared allegiance to her cousin Philip the Good. In the Treaty of Delft in 1428, she retired to Holland, where she married secretly Frans van Borsele, Stadhouder of Holland, tasked with guarding her (she was 27 years old). On hearing this, her heir and cousin Philip the Good, decided on killing the fourth husband: to save him, Jacqueline gave up her rights over her lands. On the death of Jacqueline in 1436 without issue, Hainaut including Le Quesnoy became, by law, Burgundian possessions. That same year, one of the bands of "routiers" across France, who had fought the British but now being laid off, commanded by Chabannes and other leaders fought against Hainaut, where it gained a justified nickname of "the Skinners". The nearby Mormal forest served as a refuge to the inhabitants of the villages of Le Quesnoy, who were not too perturbed; although an expeditionary force formed by Jean de Croy had been beaten by the Skinners, who fortunately withdrew after their victory to Champagne.

==== Philip the Good Duke of Burgundy ====
In the 15th Century Le Quesnoy was the ideal holiday resort of the Dukes of Burgundy: they organized lavish parties, and in their moments of relaxation in the country they hunted, their favorite sport, in the nearby Mormal forest which happened to be the specific domain of the Counts of Hainaut. During these hunts, deer were hunted (for their meat of choice, their fur and antlers used for decoration), wolves (due to attacking the sheep), wild dogs (as carriers of rabies) and badgers (as their fur was in great demand). From this forest were also taken the best wild foals (although made quite docile by the presence of man over time) which later would take part in parades to honour the combat of the troops of the Count of Hainaut.

Under the Treaty of Delft in 1428 with Jacqueline, Philip the Good of Burgundy became the heir of Hainaut: he officially took possession in 1436 becoming the new Count of Hainault. However he left his aunt, Margaret of Burgundy, the mother of the late Jacqueline, the enjoyment of manors, the income, and the castle of the castle of Le Quesnoy dubbed the "Castle of Margaret of Burgundy". She set up a perpetual foundation for the poor of the town which at that time stood at 300 gold florins as irrevocable annuity: This annuity endured the centuries, since in 1960 the office of Beneficence of Le Quesnoy continued to manage the donation. Upon her death in 1441, the castle became the residence of successive lords representing the Duke. These lords later became captain-governors then governors. With the advent of these lords, the provost's primarily judicial function was reassigned in their favor. The role of provost dates from 1181 in the reign of Baldwin V. The provost chaired a meeting of 32 "jurors of peace", of which 16 were selected from prominent citizens of Le Quesnoy and the rest were selected from within the jurisdiction of the provost and had to have land to be eligible. For a decision to be valid 16 jurors had to be present. From 1440, the function of the lord took considerable importance: he was to govern, keep guard of the town (watches day and night), maintain the town's rights, monitor the stipends granted to various officers of the town, and finally account to the Duke of Burgundy he represented. Many parchments of that time are in the departmental archives in Lille mentioning the lords appointed: Jean de Mons, followed in 1446 by Jean Parding; in 1451, the Lord de Haubourdin, in 1459, Guillaume Delcourt/De Le Court, in 1465, François d’Est as the first captain-governor in 1469, Jean de Rosembos, Lord of Fromelles. This role continued until the French Revolution In 1442 a fire devastated the town: most homes up to that time were built of wood. In 1444, Philip the Good came to Quesnoy, after defending the town against bands of robbers who operated regularly since 1441 in the region and called "skinners, house-robbers and shearers." He also fixed a weekly market on Tuesday and two annual fairs (on the second Monday of Lent and on 25 October, Saint Crispin's day). In 1449 a new fire destroyed Le Quesnoy: Duke donated 356 oak trees from the nearby forest or Mormal and also established a hospice in the town called "Les Chartrières".

=== Le Quesnoy in the Renaissance ===
According to a survey for the Dukes of Burgundy dated1466 for areas of, the town of Quesnoy was also the seat of a district led by a Provost in the County of Hainaut comprising the following settlements (simply called "villes"): Amfroipret, Batiches, Beaudignies, Beaurain, Berlaimont, Bermerain, Bousies, Briastre, Bry, Busegnies, Caudry, la Chapelle, Croix-Caluyau, Englefontaine, Escarmain, Eth, Fontaine-au-Bois, Forest(-en-Cambresis), Frasnoy, Ghissignies, Gommegnies, Harbegnies (Herbignies : a hamlet situated by the gate of the forest de Mormal), Haveluy, Haussy, Hecq, Jenlain, Le Quesnoy, Louvignies-Quesnoy, Malmaison, Maresches, Marbaix, Maroilles, Molaing, Neuville, Noyelles-sur-Sambre, Orsinval, Poix(-du-Nord), Potelle, Preux-au-Bois, Preux-au-Sart, Raucourt, Robersart, Romeries, Ruesnes, Salesches, St.-Martin, St.-Python, Sassegnies, Sepmeries, Solesmes, Sommaing, Taisnières-en-Thiérache, Vendegies-au-Bois, Vendegies-sur-Ecaillon, Vertain, Villereau, Villers-Pol, Wagnonville (hamlet), Wargnies-le-Grand, Wargnies-le-Petit.

==== Charles the Bold ====
On 5 June 1467 Charles, born Comte de Charolois, who was later called (French: Charles le Téméraire) usually translated as "the Bold" succeeded his father as the Duke of Burgundy and the Burgundian Netherlands including Count of Hainaut. In 1468, he came in the town of Le Quesnoy who greeted him with great fanfare. He had lived there from the age of seven, after the death of his mother, with his aunt Beatrice of Portugal. In 1454, he even gave a grand banquet at Le Quesnoy after his wedding with Isabella of Bourbon his second wife. In 1463, he also intervened in the town concerning a case of witchcraft difficult to resolve: he arrested a man named Charles de Noyers in the service of the Comte d'Estampes. The beguiling King of France, Louis XI, was apparently not entirely innocent in this matter: the powerful Duke of Burgundy took umbrage upon him. During his reign, Charles the Bold did nothing but make war: his desire was to recreate a single realm, as the former Lotharingia (from which Lorraine is named), between Burgundy and the Netherlands (he envisaged a Burgundian domination from the North Sea to Sicily).

==== Mary of Burgundy and Maximilian Archduke of Austria, later Maximilian I, Holy Roman Emperor ====
In 1477, Charles the Bold died at the Battle of Nancy. Immediately Louis XI entered Hainaut with 7000 men at arms and a powerful artillery. He stood before Le Quesnoy on 23 May 1477 but was repelled. He returned some time later and succeeded after intense bombardment (nearly 900 balls thrown) to take the town, leaving his fair archers to rush through the open breach, but torrential rain halted the fighting. However, the town surrendered the next day and preferred to pay 900 gold crowns to prevent looting: the King of France had lost 500 men at arms in the venture. The same year the young duchess Mary of Burgundy married Maximilian of Austria, head of the house of Habsburg, and in 1478 his troops drove the French out of the county of Hainaut. Antoine de Chabannes, who had been given custody of the town in 1477 by Louis XI, found himself in a hurry to get away.

The town and province of Quesnoy were also given in dowry to Margaret of York, the third wife of Charles the Bold of Burgundy upon marriage in Damme, Flanders, 1468. She was also the sister of Kings Edward IV and Richard III of England. A conscientious noblewoman and aware of her duchess status as a political contract (cementing the politico-economic links of Burgundy-Netherlands-England), she was an informed advisor to her husband, and after his death, to Mary of Burgundy and Maximilian of Austria, the new sovereigns of the Netherlands and Hainaut. At that time, several men of fiefs and legal representatives of the Duke and Duchess of Burgundy officiated at Le Quesnoy in the administration of Hainaut, such as Jehan de Longchamp, Jacquemart du Parc, Jacquemart de Surie, Enguerrand le Jeune. This feudal organization was superimposed on the manorial organization that was the foundation, which called these men of fiefs to preside over the complexity and tangle of fiefs and under-fiefs and their rights and changes over time: the seals of those "notaires" appended to the deeds they passed conferred full authority and exempted the use of the seal of the Bailiwick (of the municipal administration, today).

==== Philip the Handsome ====
On his wife Mary of Burgundy's demise in 1482, Maximilian of Austria gave to his son Philip the Handsome, still a child, his mother's inheritance, thus Hainaut passed to Austria. As to Le Quesnoy, it no longer served as favorite home to the new princes: the remoteness of the court was detrimental to the town. In 1492, the population which had previously more than 800 heads of families was reduced to a quarter of its former size. The Court had moved to Mons with many middle-class families and many trades following. Le Quesnoy from this time was seen as a stronghold under the authority of lords and captains-governors: in 1478, The Lord de Maingoval, Count of Chimay took this role. In 1493, we find Robert de Melun, in 1499, John of Luxembourg, in 1511, Philippe de Belleforière, Lord of Romeries and of Caudry. Maximilian of Austria kept a considerable bastion in Le Quesnoy to withstand the incessant incursions of the French settled in Cambrai. At that time, the religious communities in the town, already very numerous, developed in peace yet appointments of the heads of these establishments had to be made with the consent of the central government. Philip the Handsome (French: Philippe le Beau), the ruler upon attaining the age of majority, married Joanna of Castile and Aragon. In 1500 Philip gave the castle of Le Quesnoy to his sister Margaret of Austria (later regent of the Netherlands under her godson Charles V). Philip, the local prince born, raised and loved by people in the Netherlands died in 1506, leaving two infant sons: Charles of Luxembourg, later Charles V of Spain and Ferdinand I, Holy Roman Emperor, the succession of the nations.

==== Charles V of Spain ====
Charles was born in Ghent in 1500, educated and advised by the Hainaut tutor Guillaume de Croÿ, Lord of Chièvres in whom he gave his full confidence upon succeeding his father in 1515. Upon the death of his maternal grandfather in 1516, he became undisputed King of Spain and its rich colonies. He became, in 1520 elected the new Emperor of the Holy Roman Empire. Amassing so much power in the hands of one man whose states surrounded France led to the inevitable: Francis I of France and Charles V of Spain were in perpetual strife and wars during their respective reigns. At that time, the garrison of Quesnoy composed of a Walloon company 200 soldiers, commanded by a governor named by Antoine de Croÿ, Lord of Thour and Sempy. The company had to increase the bourgeois ranks of artillery (created in 1517), archers (existing since 1379) and officers, enjoying special privileges. In 1521, the King of France made his raids in Hainaut and ravaged Ostrevant. In 1523, Charles V came to Le Quesnoy to fight the French raids and strengthened the fortifications of the town which had not been changed since 1314. It was then that the walls of the ramparts, still currently existing, were built on the foundations of the original enclosure. A new design of fortifications had been born at the end of the 15th century developed by the Italians. It was to divide the angles of the fortifications, the towers, which, projecting from the enclosure while remaining attached to them, allowed defenders to fire at all angles against the attackers (also allowing the use of artillery). The invention of these bastions offered shooting in all directions and the stronghold of Quesnoy did not escape this rule hence in 1534, Charles V's engineer, Frate da Modena (Jacopo Seghizzi) drew plans for the refortification and to replace the medieval walls. To defend Le Quesnoy now were new towers (bastion Impérial, bastion César, bastion Soyez, bastion Saint-Martin et bastion Vert) and four gates (Porte de la Flamengerie, porte de Valenciennes, porte Saint-Martin, porte Fauroeulx) and the work took nearly 20 years. The last tower of the few preserved earlier towers was demolished in 1885. In 1540, Charles returned to Le Quesnoy accompanied by the Dauphin of France and the Duke Orleans (both sons of Francis) as a 10-year truce was signed in 1538 between the belligerents. He returned in 1543 also to check the progress of the work to the town and its fortifications. At this time he ordered the closure of the Gate of Flamengerie to allow flooding around the ramparts. These great works monopolized the activity of town residents who took full advantage of this period of relative calm for entertainment with major feasts and festivals of jubilation: we saw for a time here various companies promoted and sponsored by local lords and monasteries with rich costumes and playing drums and trumpets. Also in 1543, Francis reappeared with an army of 40,000 men and captured Landrecies, Maubeuge and D’Aymeries and Berlaimont castles: establishing his headquarters at the Abbey of Maroilles: these gains were ceded to Charles V under the Treaty of Crépy in 1544. In 1554 Henri II of France fought against Charles V and took Le Quesnoy, but could not hold it: famine prevailed in the town, as the province had been devastated by the rekindled war.

==== Philip II of Spain ====
After the abdication in 1555, of free will, of Charles V, his son Philip II of Spain succeeded to Spain and its rich American colonies, Italy and the Spanish Netherlands (including Hainaut). The reign of the new sovereign was characterized by the struggle against reformed religion harshly repressed by the Inquisition. The rebels, the Huguenots called "beggars" or "image breakers" began their campaign in 1566, attacking churches and desecrating any object of worship: on 24 August that year, all the churches in the town of Valenciennes were occupied and ransacked by a thousand of these rebels. Faced with this threat, the garrison of Quesnoy attacked on 24 November with 80 guns and the Huguenots entrenched themselves in Valenciennes. On 23 March 1567 the Huguenots surrendered their arms and the repression by Spanish was too severe, which displeased the people. In the Battle of Le Quesnoy, 12 November 1568, the Prince of Orange, the spiritual leader of the Reformed Church, attacked a body of Spanish soldiers under the walls of Le Quesnoy and then captured the town. The Duke of Alba, Governor of the Netherlands, acting on behalf of Spain the same year retook the town as the Prince of Orange withdrew into France. In 1569, it was decided to top the watchtower of the castle with an octagonal belvedere 17 metres (56 ft) (the tower existed until 1768: it was destroyed on that date by a hurricane). From 1572, the Protestants supported by the French pillaged the area for several years, because of these facts Sieur Guillaume de Hornes Heze (who realigned with the nobility and the people of Hainaut in dissatisfaction with the Spanish military presence) was executed in 1580 in Le Quesnoy for having attended the Bishop of Cambrai. The result was a growing hatred of the population vis-à-vis Spain and its king. At that time, the abbot of the Benedictine abbey of Maroilles, Frederick d’Yve (born in Bavai) became councilor of state and played a key role as intermediary in negotiations between the warring parties in the Netherlands : the representatives of the Protestants led by the Prince of Orange; and the representatives of the Catholic King Philip II of Spain. In 1581 seven northern provinces of the Spanish Netherlands, however, joined a Protestant secession and declared their independence under the name "United Provinces". In 1583, the Magistrate (a Mayeur, four aldermen, a treasurer and a prosecutor) decided to build a town hall and a belfry. Meanwhile, and until 1593, the rebels were fought: only after this date did calm recover in the Le Quesnoy province.

==== Philip III of Spain ====
Another Philip succeeded as head of the Spanish Empire in 1598. He made peace with all the old enemies: the Spanish Netherlands were administered by the Archduke Albert and his wife the Infanta Isabella under the tutelage of Spain. The region bathed in a period of peace in the first third of the 17th Century. The garrison of Le Quesnoy was increased at that time to station 3000 armed men. As there was not enough room in the barracks of the town, use was made to lodge some of the men with the citizens but protests ensued from the population. In 1616 the convent of Récollets was founded at a place called "L’Hermitage," near the town walls east of the Rue du Gard: its mission was to assist the clergy.

==== Philip IV of Spain ====
Another Philip succeeded as head of the Spanish Empire in 1621. In his time the castle's restoration was completed in 1625 and the town in 1631 gave 50,000 florins to borrow to pay off its debts. In 1635, France under the influence of Richelieu allied to the United Provinces (Dutch Protestant) and sent its heralds to the Grand Sablon Square in Brussels for a declaration of war against Spain dragging the southern Spanish Netherlands (including Hainaut) into the turmoil of the fourth phase so-called " French phase" of the Thirty Years War, between the French and Dutch versus a Hispano-Austrian-German alliance. Hainaut at that time was criss-crossed by all troops and vehicles of war and requisitions impoverished rural areas. This misfortune led to another ... in 1639, an epidemic became widespread throughout the region and many people perished in Le Quesnoy. In 1648, the Prince of Ligne came to Le Quesnoy with 4,000 men equipped with artillery and prepared to defense operations, which were needed to counter the advance of French troops. The following year, the property belonging to the French in the town was confiscated. On 31 August 1651 the Hispanic-Hainaut garrison at Le Quesnoy won one last success in the walls of the town. But on 4 September 1654 the Vicomte de Turenne, at the head of the French army, stood before Le Quesnoy with a powerful artillery: he seized the town whilst the Spanish before leaving tried to render useless the fortifications by damaging the most out of walls. Turenne became master, cleverly foiled the plans of Condé (the Great Condé, Duc d'Enghien, then in the service of Spain).

=== Le Quesnoy becomes French ===
At the end of the Fronde in 1654, the town was taken by the French royal army of Turenne. The town that was never French becomes it to the great pleasure of the court. The young King Louis XIV received the town as a sacred gift.

The town was then put in the hands of a man from Mazarin, Talon nicknamed 'of Le Quesnoy' administered the town that officially became French in 1659 under the Treaty of the Pyrenees. During this transitional period, many properties of the bourgeois came under the control of war profiteers who were local and French.

=== Le Quesnoy transformed ===
An advanced bastion of France until 1678 when Valenciennes became French, the fortifications of Quesnoy were modified and reinforced by the very young Vauban who made in some way his classes. The existing five bastions were amended or supplemented to create a body eight strong. The northern areas (Royal bastion) and south (Gard stronghold) are most representative of the action of Vauban. However, in the old regime of France where clientele took precedence over skills or even economy, the work was not awarded to local contractors.

Despite the good reputation of the fortification work begun under the direction of Louvois and Vauban, the fortification was quickly outdated and the town was taken in 1712 by the imperialists in 6 days. The governor of the town of Mr. de la Badie, was made to explain his alleged "mediocre" resistance. He was quickly released because the French besieged the town under Claude Louis Hector de Villars, in the hands of the Austrians, could only resist one day or seven days more under the orders of the old French military.

The experience of easy capture of the town led the authorities to strengthen the sector of the fortifications by which had the Imperials had attacked in 1712. A huge hornwork, unique in the world, was then built to protect the vicinity called Fauroeulx and the gate of the same name. The work in question divided the supply ponds into two, known today under the names of The Red Bridge Pond and The Blessed Pond. These two ponds supplying water to flood the ditches in case of siege, were supplemented by two other ponds no longer exist (the pond d’Aulnoye and that of L’Ecaillon in the forest of Mormal).

The 18th century, during the reign of Louis XV and the beginning of the reign of Louis XVI, was relatively peaceful for the northern border. In fact, travelers passing by the town were astonished at the friendliness of Quercitains who gained a reputation, as flattering as it was, as "pretty people," that is to say, polite people.

=== Le Quesnoy during the Revolution ===
It was the chief town of the District of Quesnoy from 1790 to 1795.

The city on the border of the young republic was taken by the Austrians and then again in July 1794 by the troops of Scherer after a severe siege in a downpour. 3000 Austrians were taken prisoner on this occasion. The news of the capture of the city was sent within hours by telegraph Chappe, a world first, at the delegation of the Parisian public that greeted it.

In late imperial times, the city was taken without much resistance by the Dutch during a mock siege. At the end of Congress of Vienna in 1815, it was decided that the city was to be occupied by Russian troops for three years. Relations between Quercitains and Russians are friendly to the point that many marriages are between Russian officers and the local ladies. This relationship, although one officer left his wife to return Russia, between the town and empire of the Tsars, is also recalled when the Franco-Russian accord became the cornerstone of the alliance system of Third Republic on the eve of the Great War.

However, the city exhausted by that time, would never regain the prestige that made it the second largest city in French Hainaut.

=== Le Quesnoy in World War I ===
The New Zealand monument commemorating the liberation of Le Quesnoy.

The town was taken on 23 August 1914 by German troops and suffered a harsh occupation for four years. The mayor of the town, Achille Carlier, was condemned for hiding wounded French and British on the arrival of German troops. Carlier was tried by a German military court in June 1915, convicted and sentenced to five years at hard labor. On appeal, he was defended by Friedrich Grimm, a German lawyer, had his sentence reduced and was released in June 1916.

After a difficult approach through the valley of the Ecaillon, the city was relieved on 4 November 1918 by New Zealand troops. In a major movement of British troops who had distinguished themselves in Ghissignies, Louvignies, Jolimetz and Orsinval, taking the old fortress was given to the New Zealand troops encircling the city, who followed from the west a railway track (now dismantled) and bypassed the Red Bridge Pond near Potelle. A garrison of 1,000 German soldiers, including many defenders beaten in Tournai, was ordered to withstand whatever happened. Civilians in the city were ordered to evacuate on 27 October but some remained in cellars. On the third refusal to surrender, including one sent by an aircraft, the New Zealand troops launched an assault on the town while preserving it. In the late afternoon, the New Zealand artillery and British artillery aimed at the top of the walls and confused the defenders through the use of "oil bombs". Some men led by 2Lt Leslie Cecil Lloyd Averill reached the ramparts of the southern sector where the remains of the sluicegate of the mill in the town and used a ladder to scale the walls. The New Zealanders took the town after street fighting in the early evening of 4 November 1918. Taking Le Quesnoy and neighbouring communities opened the door to the Sambre Gap, that is: the way to Belgium and Germany which precipitated the defeat of Germany.

The New Zealanders' action in November 1918 was memorialized in Aotearoa. Constructed to honor the excellence of preparation which remains in the memories of the New Zealand Artillery, for the courage of the soldiers recognized by numerous military citations (over 50 recorded in the London Gazette), and the preservation of the city.

On 10 November 1918 the President Raymond Poincaré visited the town that re-entered history by its sacrifice. A military parade was then held.

On 15 July 1923 the New Zealanders' monument was inaugurated. Mayor Daniel Vincent welcomed Marshal Joffre, Lord Milner (a signatory of the Treaty of Versailles), and Sir James Allen, the New Zealand High Commissioner in London as honored guests.

Many New Zealanders traveled to Le Quesnoy to join the French on 4 November 2018 to celebrate the centenary of the liberation of Le Quesnoy. Many events were held that day including the unveiling of a plan to construct a New Zealand War Memorial Museum. In October 2023, this original plan was actualized when the New Zealand Liberation Museum - Te Arawhata in Le Quesnoy was opened to the public. This newer museum is in addition to four memorials previously constructed in Aotearoa.

The big or Bourdon bell of the carillon at Le Quesnoy is dedicated to New Zealanders. After the abandonment the Germans set fire to the belfry, the big bell was melted. The bronze was recovered and used to make a new bell to continue the tradition. A bell in the Wellington National war memorial carillon is named Le Quesnoy and is dedicated to the New Zealand Rifle Brigade.

=== Le Quesnoy in World War II ===
During the Battle of France, Generalleutnant Max von Hartlieb-Walsporn ordered his 5th Panzer Division to invade Le Quesnoy on 18 May 1940. The town was defended by a small force which included a battalion of Moroccan Tirailleurs. The result was a four-day siege which kept von Hartlieb-Walsporn's force in place at a time when other German armoured formations were making rapid progress. Von Hartlieb-Walsporn eventually took Le Quesnoy, but was relieved of his command soon after.

== Sites and monuments ==
- The ramparts, built in the Spanish period and modified by Vauban and his successors until 1914.
- The bastion Verde Hospital siege. The bastion Green is the smallest but the most interesting of bastions of Quesnoy. Its doors, the oldest, attributed to Charles V, date from about 1540. The work was then modified, enhanced and refined several times. In 1759, the top sides were removed thereby increasing the capacity of the structure and the surface of the bastion. The interior space thus created allowed the addition of four underground rooms accessible only by a courtyard. The superstructure was modified in 1882.
- The belfry of the Town Hall, solid and chunky, which was destroyed many times, in 1794, 1918 and 1940. The first tower was built in 1583. It now houses a belfry of 48 bells. Directly adjacent to the belfry, the town hall built in 1700, offers a fine example of classical building. The grand staircase in the lobby is a classified architectural work.
- The memorial of the town, near the town hall, is a work created by Valenciennes sculptor Félix Desruelles.
- On the ramparts, another work by Desruelles commemorates the liberation of the city (World War I) by ANZAC troops from New Zealand. This monument of the New Zealand fixed on a curtain wall between the two bastions of the Gard and Saint-Martin, is dated 1922. Like many memorials of the Great War, it was opened on Sunday 15 July 1923 in the presence of Marshal Joffre, Lord Milner and Sir James Allen (NZ). The New Zealand government decided in 1920 to include its lost youth in stone. Thus, the "jack of all trades" New Zealand architect, Samuel Hurst Seager was appointed official architect of the Great War memorials of New Zealand. His work was noticed by a traveling exhibition for "improving the aesthetic standards of memorials" had seduced the local authorities. Hurst Seager thus received the task of designing the memorials of Longueval and Le Quesnoy in France, Mesen in Belgium and Chunuk Bair in Gallipoli – the four foremost places of the New Zealand Expeditionary Force during the Great War. In addition to designing, S. Hurst Seager had to find the ideal location of the memorial. So it was he who oversaw the erection of the monument whose implementation was provided by the artist Felix Desruelles the creator of the monument to the dead of the town. The plan of the New Zealanders monument in itself was the work of a designer of the British Flying Corps from Scotland, Robert Henry Fraser, a specialist in plastering and founder of the Art War Memorial Tablet in 1918.
- The New Zealand Liberation Museum - Te Arawhata is housed in the mansion house originally built by Achille Carlier Snr as the mayoral home for Le Quesnoy. It is located on a four-hectare site in the centre of Le Quesnoy. Carlier would later become deputy mayor of Le Quesnoy and a member of parliament. A local Le Quesnoy architect, Véronique Coupet, and a New Zealand architect based in London, Robert Hanson, worked together to transform the three-story mansion house into the museum. Wētā Workshop, best known for cinematic special effects work on Lord of the Rings, Avatar, and Dune, created an immersive visitor experience. This includes a large-scale, hyper-realistic soldier and the piece that gave the museum its name: Te Arawhata (The Ladder). This artwork is a 7.4m structure that extends up through the museum stairwell.
- In the Cemetery, a marble sculpture given by the state: Les deux douleurs or the two pains, by Théodore Rivière.
- The castle, built in the twelfth century by Baldwin IV of Hainaut, it was the home of the Counts of Hainaut, who at some point were also Counts of Holland and Zeeland. Jacqueline of Hinault was born at the castle in 1401. Charles the Bold and his daughter were the last sovereigns to live there. It was later neglected and almost abandoned in the sixteenth century. Of the prestigious medieval castle there are few vestiges: a gateway and a set of remarkable Romanesque cellars. The current large building at the site is called Cernay and was mostly built in 1681.
- The Tower of Baldwin the Builder. This tower is one of the oldest parts of the fortification. Vulnerable at its top to artillery, this was razed. However, it is home to a beautiful vaulted room, allowing the reception of fifty men.
- The Fauroeulx gate. It is the only gate that has not suffered in Le Quesnoy from World War II. It connects the city with the horn work of Faulroeux.
- The bastion Caesar, which was built under Louis XIV from a structure built by Charles V, one hundred and thirty years before. The restoration of the right flank of the bastion in 1991 helped find the artillery embrasures arranged in the sixteenth century, masked by the brick veneer created by Vauban in the seventeenth century.
- The chapel of the hospital building curiously built in latticed soft stone, gothic style, is actually a nineteenth-century structure and a fine example of neo-gothic architecture of the period.
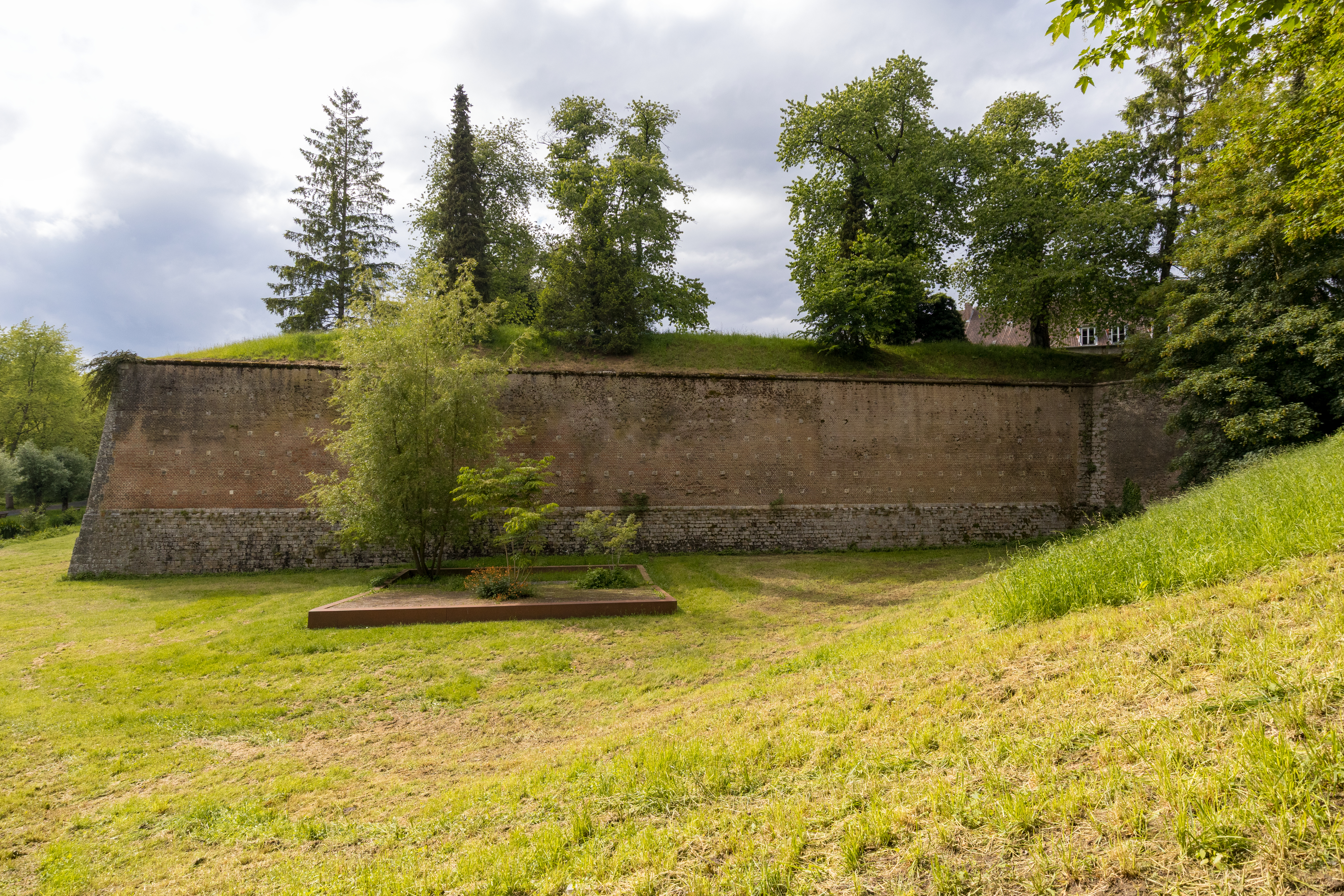
Ramparts

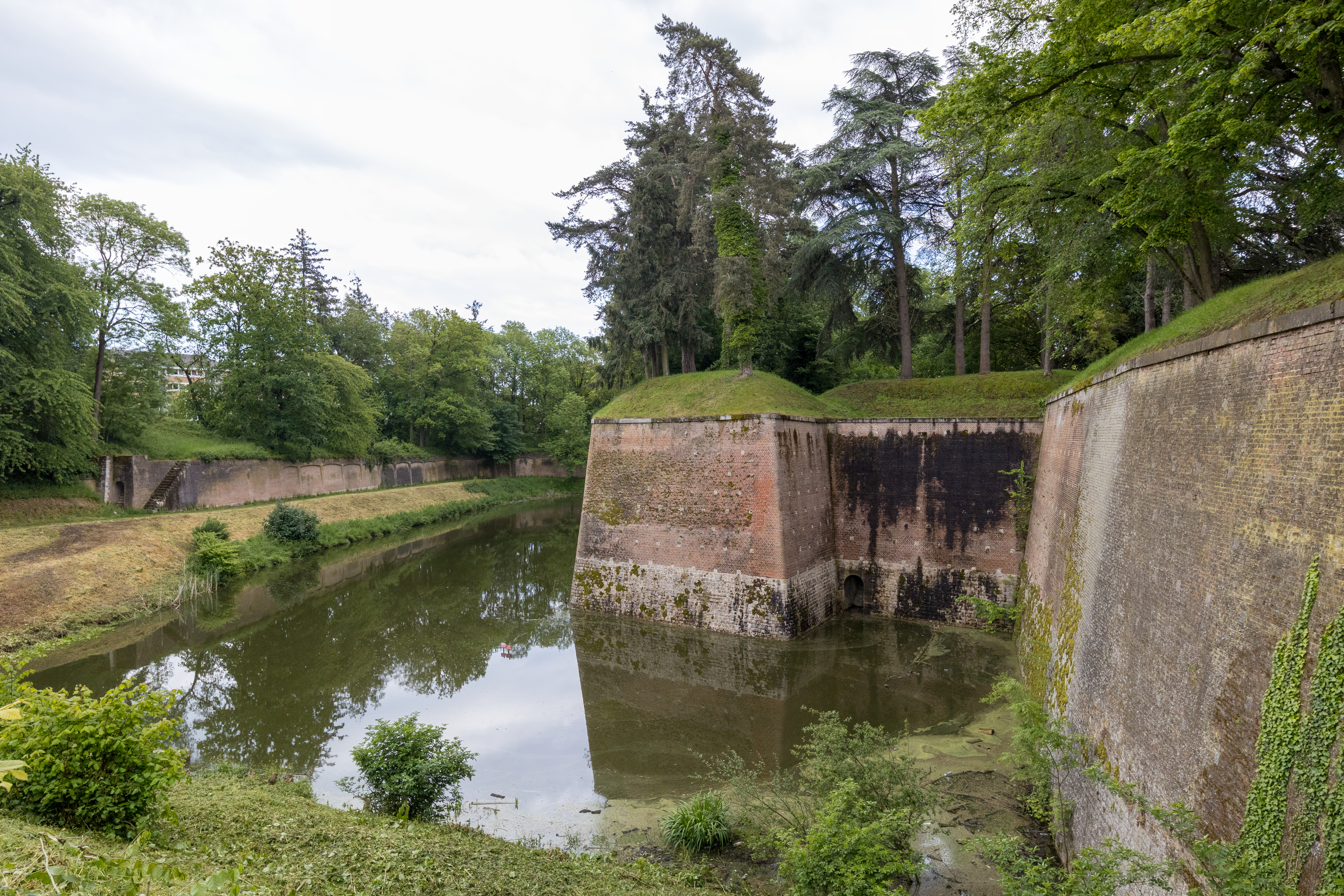

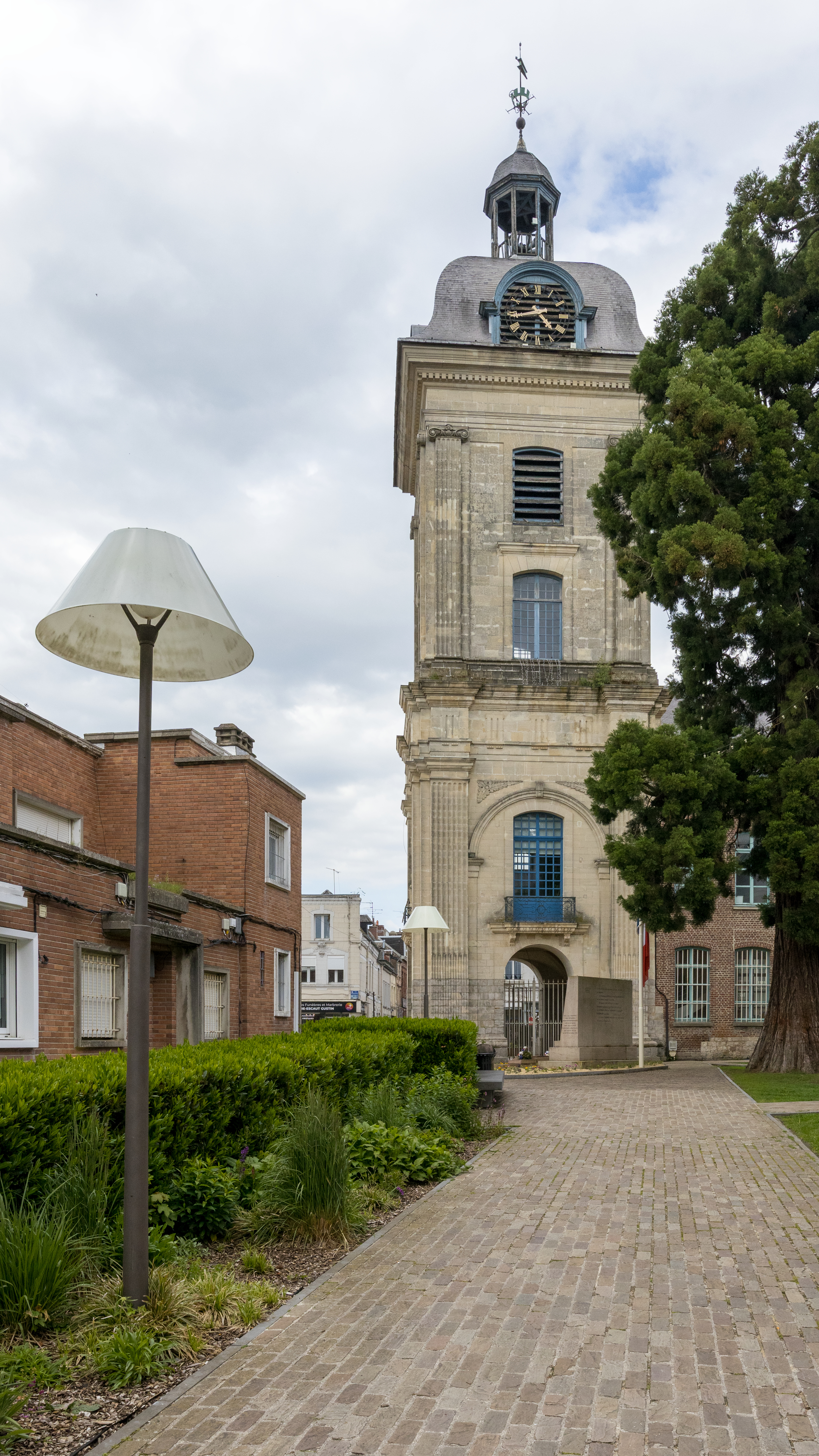
Tower

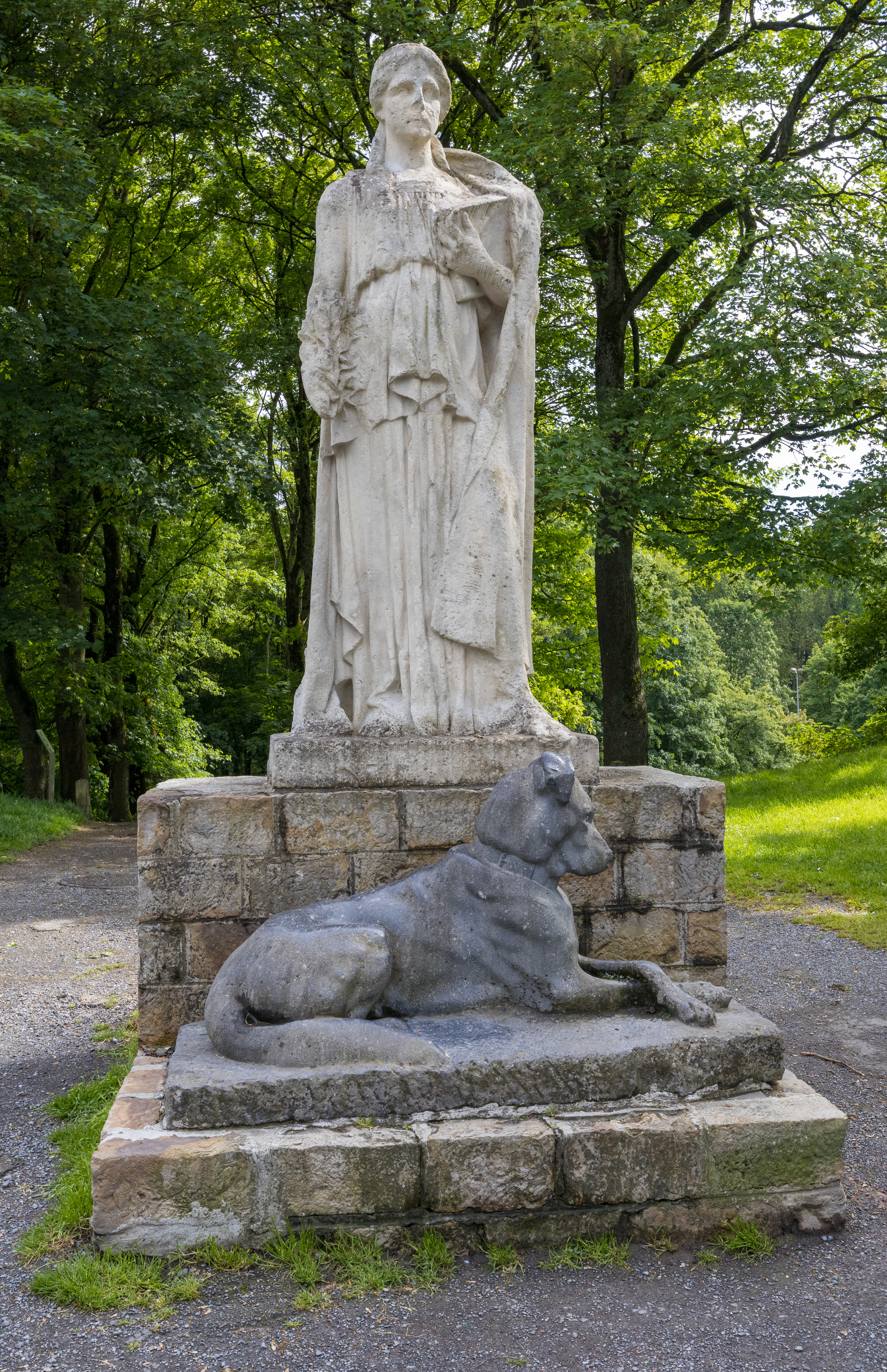
Statue of the Lady with the Dog, symbolizing wisdom

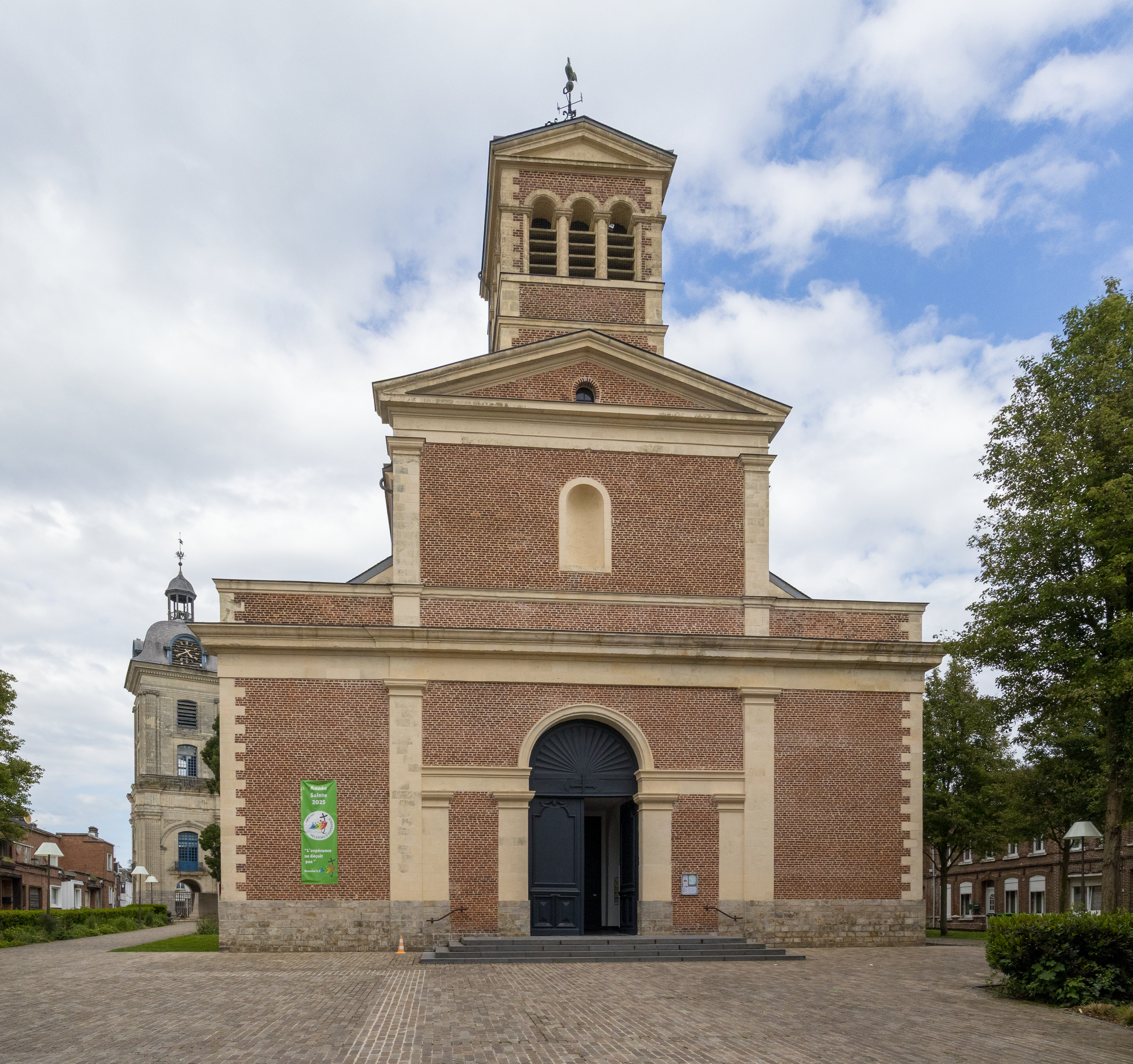
Church Our Lady of the Assumption

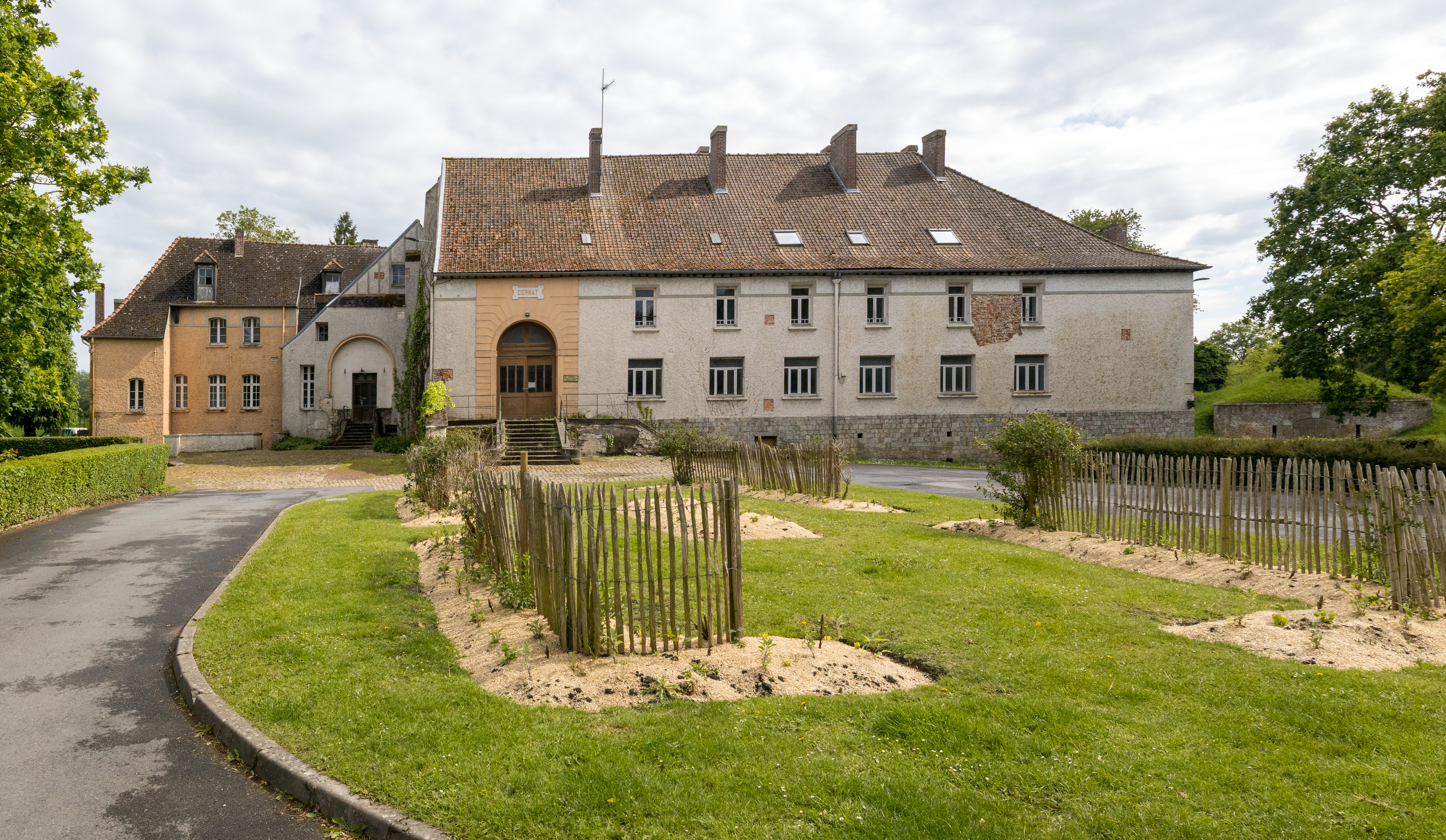
Castle, residence of Margaret of Burgundy

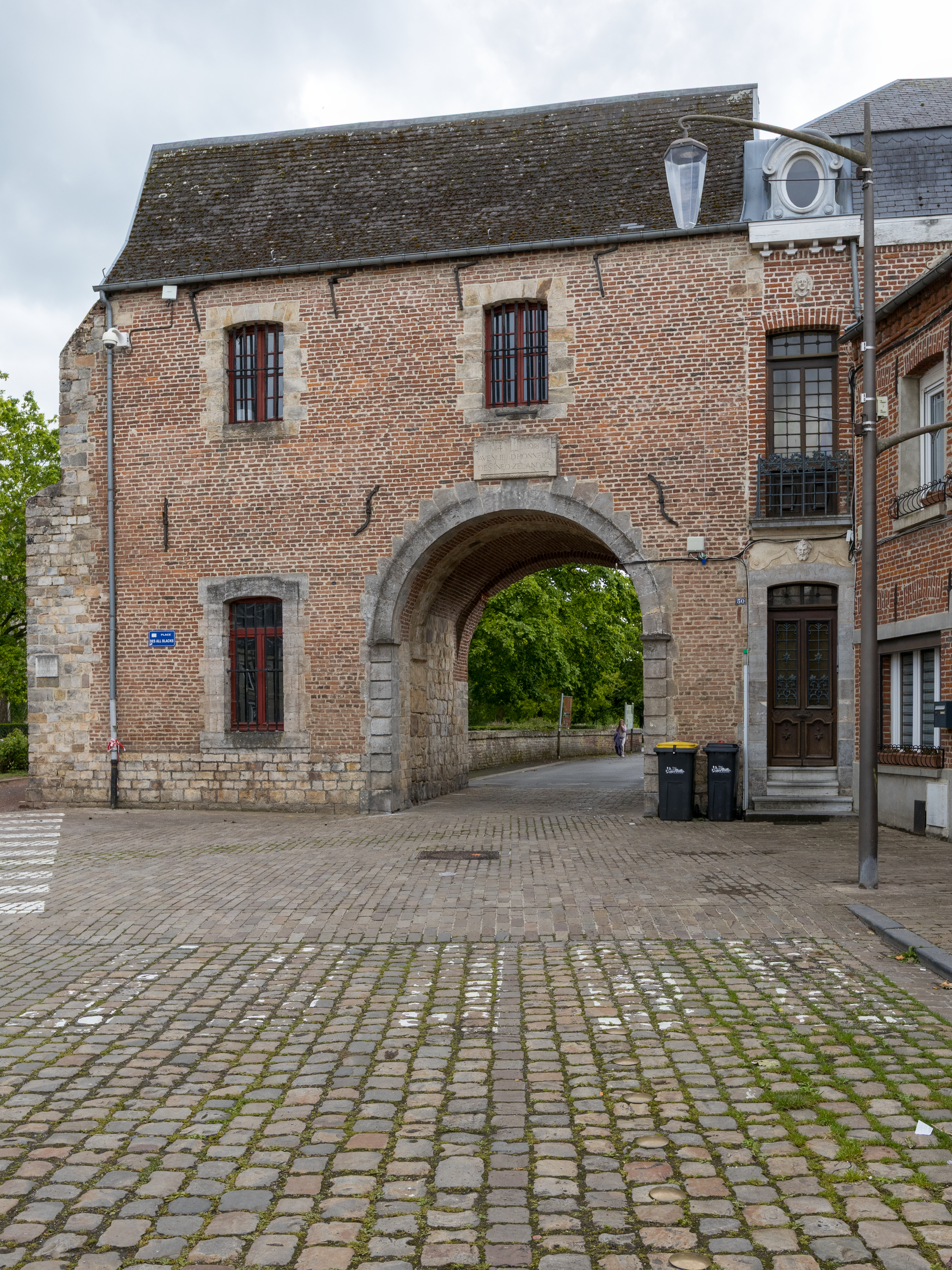
Gateway to the Count's Castle

=== Born in Le Quesnoy ===
Margaret of Burgundy (1374-1441)
Olivier Bonnaire, cyclist
Philip of Cleves, Lord of Ravenstein
Julien Auguste Joseph Mermet, French Army General
Jacqueline, Countess of Hainaut.
Ludovic Leroy, footballer

=== Deaths in Le Quesnoy ===
Margaret II of Hainaut
William III of Hainaut
Baldwin of Avesnes

=== School ===
Eugène Thomas, Mayor of Le Quesnoy (1945–1947, 1953–69). The town's main school bears his name.

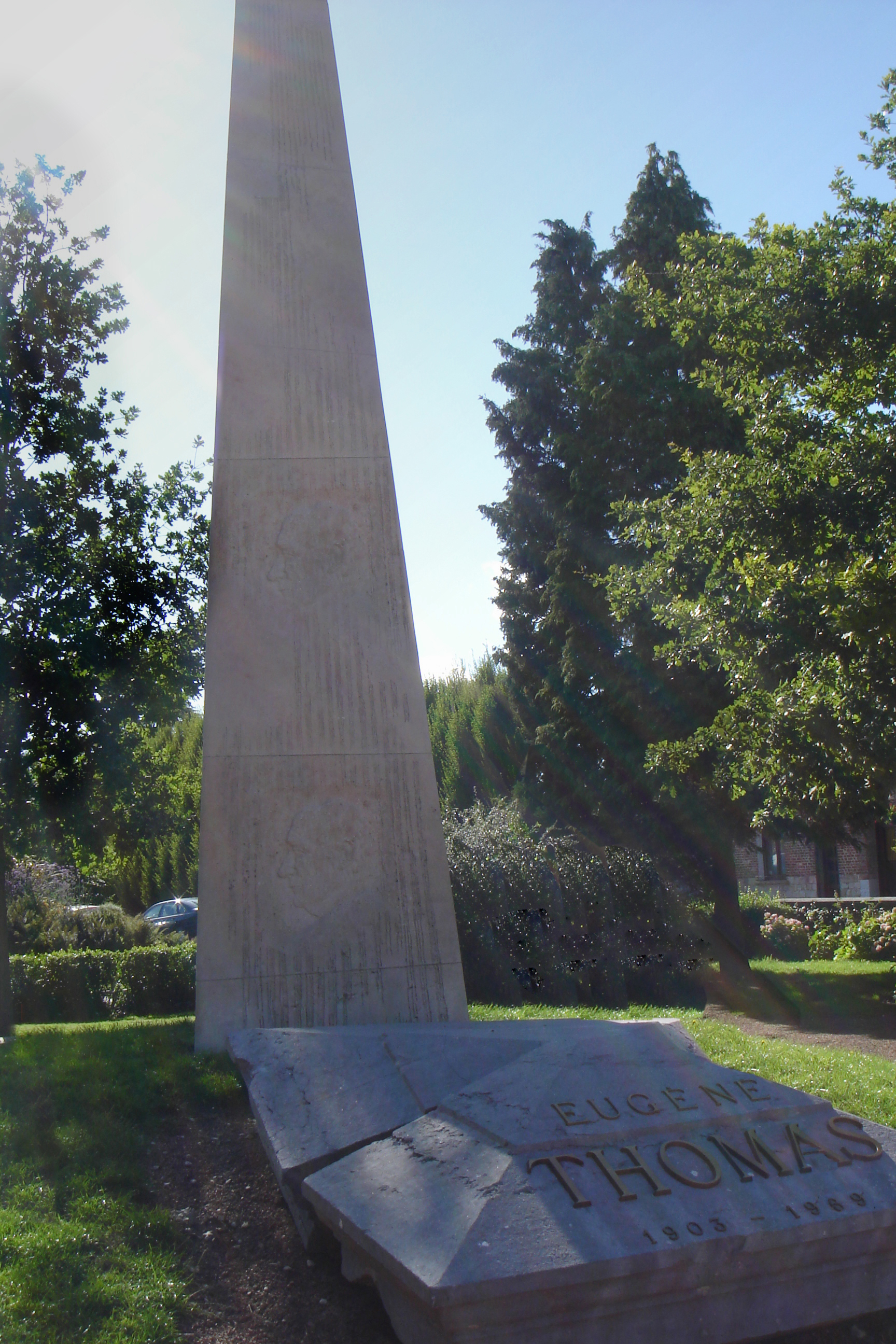
Monument to Eugène Thomas

== Folklore ==
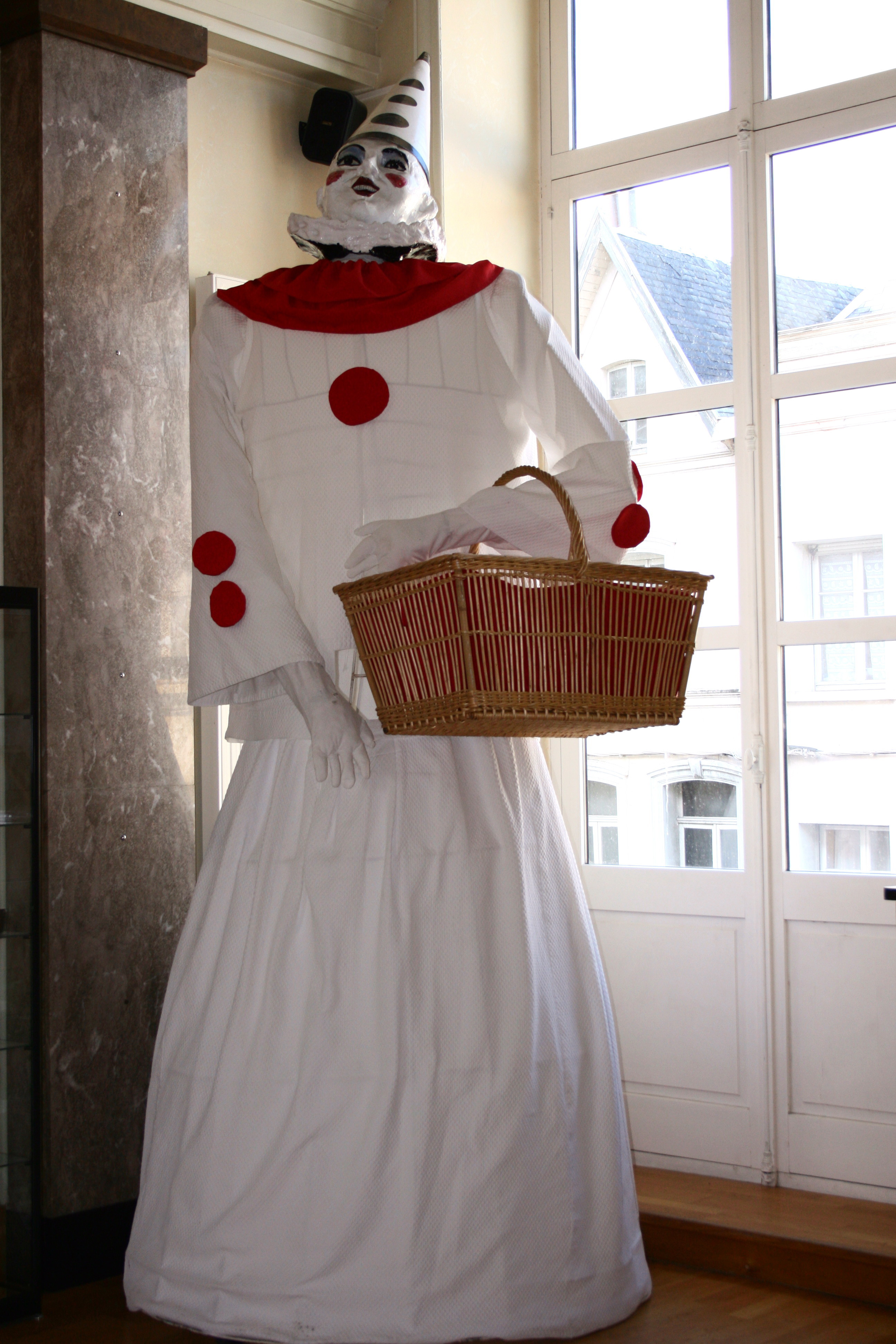
Pierrot Bimberlot

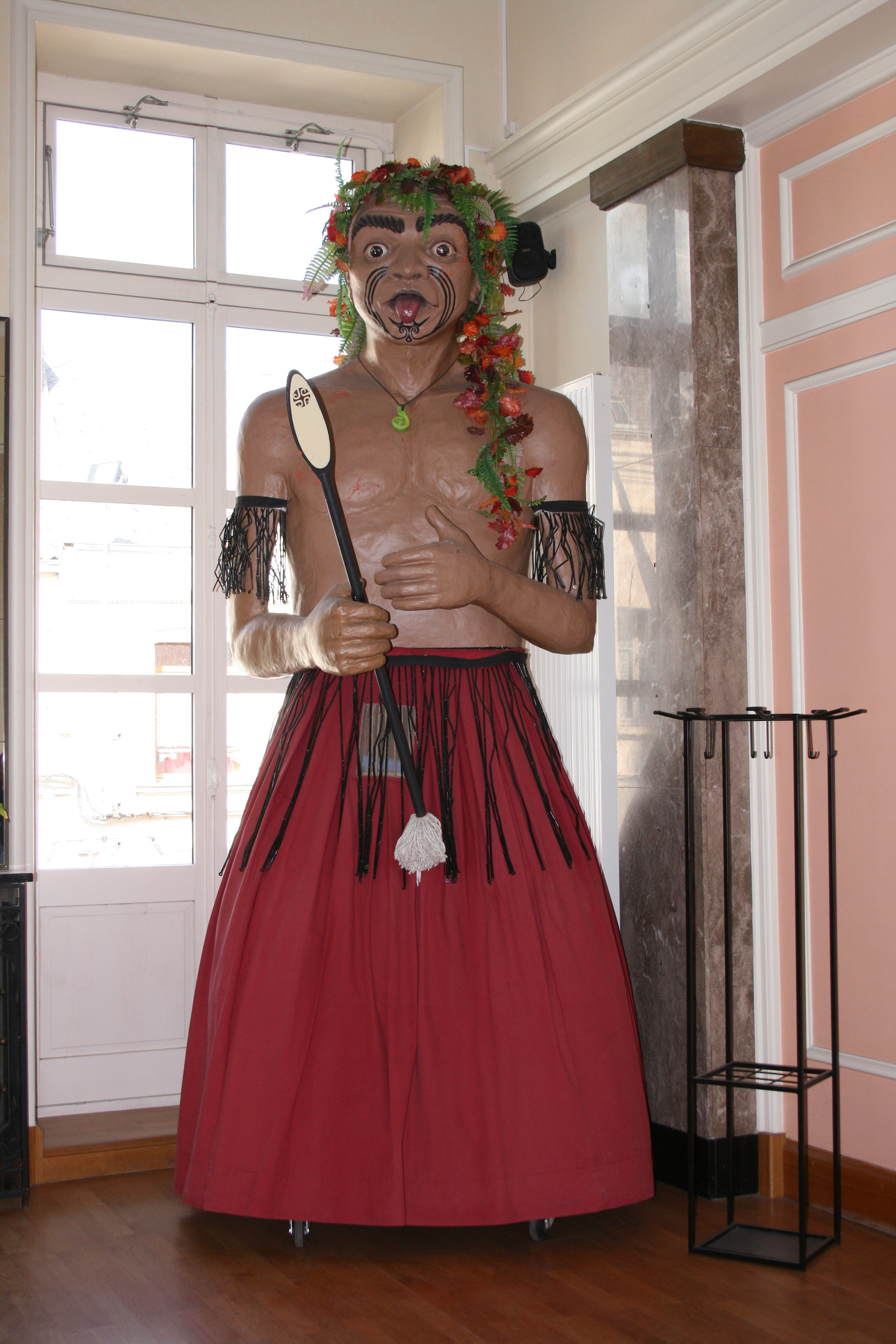
Giant Maori

Le Quesnoy has two of the giant statues of Nord (Géants du Nord), kept on the first floor of the town hall: Pierre Bimberlot, created in 1904, and Giant Maori, created in 2004. On the first Sunday in August, Pierrot Bimberlot tours the town distributing sweets to onlookers.

The New Zealand troops who liberated the town in 1918 formed from their ranks an entertainment group the digger pierrots in which the actors were made up as Pierrot. The coincidence appears to have gone unnoticed in history.

=== Bibliography ===
- Bruno Carpentier, Le Quesnoy, l'archétype du Hainaut (2005). Éditions SOPAIC.

Study of

- The castral politics of Baldwin IV Builder and son Baldwin V le Courageux;
- The social emancipation of the 13th to 15th centuries (Publication of the accounts of the prévôté of Le Quesnoy – 13th Century)
- The fortifications from the 16th to 20th centuries
- Bernard Debrabant (2008). Invenit (ed.). Vauban et la fortification du Quesnoy au XVIIe siècle.

== Heraldry ==
The arms of Le Quesnoy are blazoned "Silver, one oak between two smaller ones, on a green base." In 1918, the municipality wanted to add a New Zealand Silver Fern to the crest (The Times and The Grey River Argus report the visit of General Hart in November 1918) in gratitude for liberation, but the rules of heraldry have prevented the plan.

== Twin towns – sister cities ==
Le Quesnoy is twinned with:

- Ratingen, Germany
- Morlanwelz, Belgium
- Dej, Romania
- Cambridge, New Zealand

== See also ==
- Treaty of the Pyrenees
- Communes of the Nord department
