= New Zealand Liberation Museum =

Art museum in Auckland, New Zealand

- Musée Néo-Zélandais de la Libération
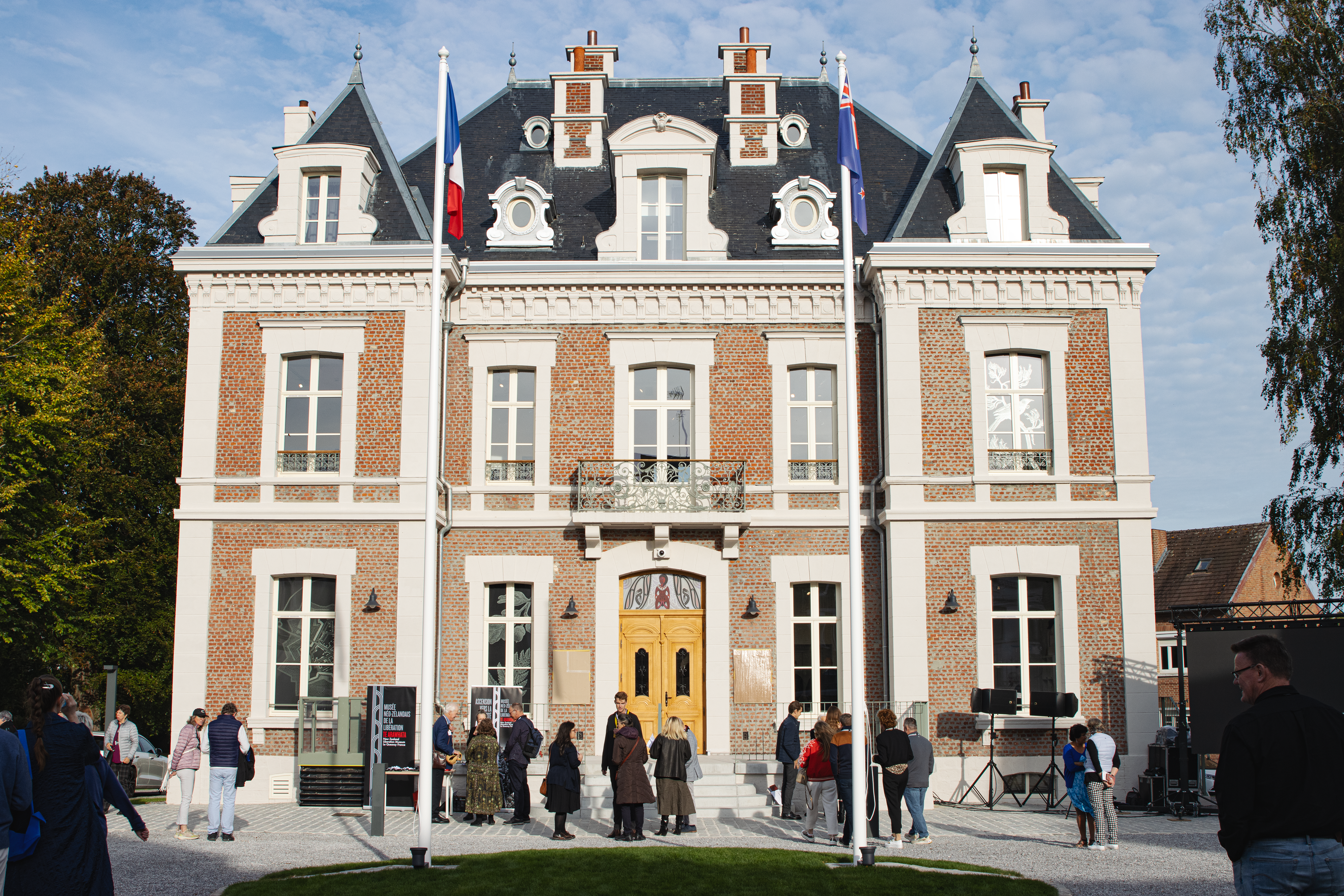
- Front of New Zealand Liberation Museum
- Interactive map of the New Zealand Liberation Museum area

General information
- Location: 18 Rue Achille Carlier, 59530 Le Quesnoy,France, Le Quesnoy
- Coordinates: 50°14′54″N 3°38′07″E

Website
- https://nzliberationmuseum.com/

New Zealand Liberation Museum (French: Musée Néo-Zélandais de la Libération, Le Quesnoy France) (Māori: Te Arawhata) is a museum located in Le Quesnoy, France. The Museum was made to preserve the stories and legacy of the New Zealand soldiers who liberated Le Quesnoy in 1918.

== History ==
Le Quesnoy is a fortress town in the Northeast of France. The town and its citizens were under German occupation from August 1914 to November 1918. On 4 November 1918, as part of the Battle of Sambre, the New Zealand Division arrived at the walls of Le Quesnoy.

New Zealand troops chose not to fire over the town's fortification in order to preserve civilian life. Instead, creating a smoke screen, New Zealand troops were able to climb, using ladders, over the town's fortifications and successfully enter Le Quesnoy undetected. The New Zealand troops outflanked German troops, who eventually surrendered. The town and its 1,600 civilians were liberated with no civilian fatalities; however, 130 New Zealanders died.

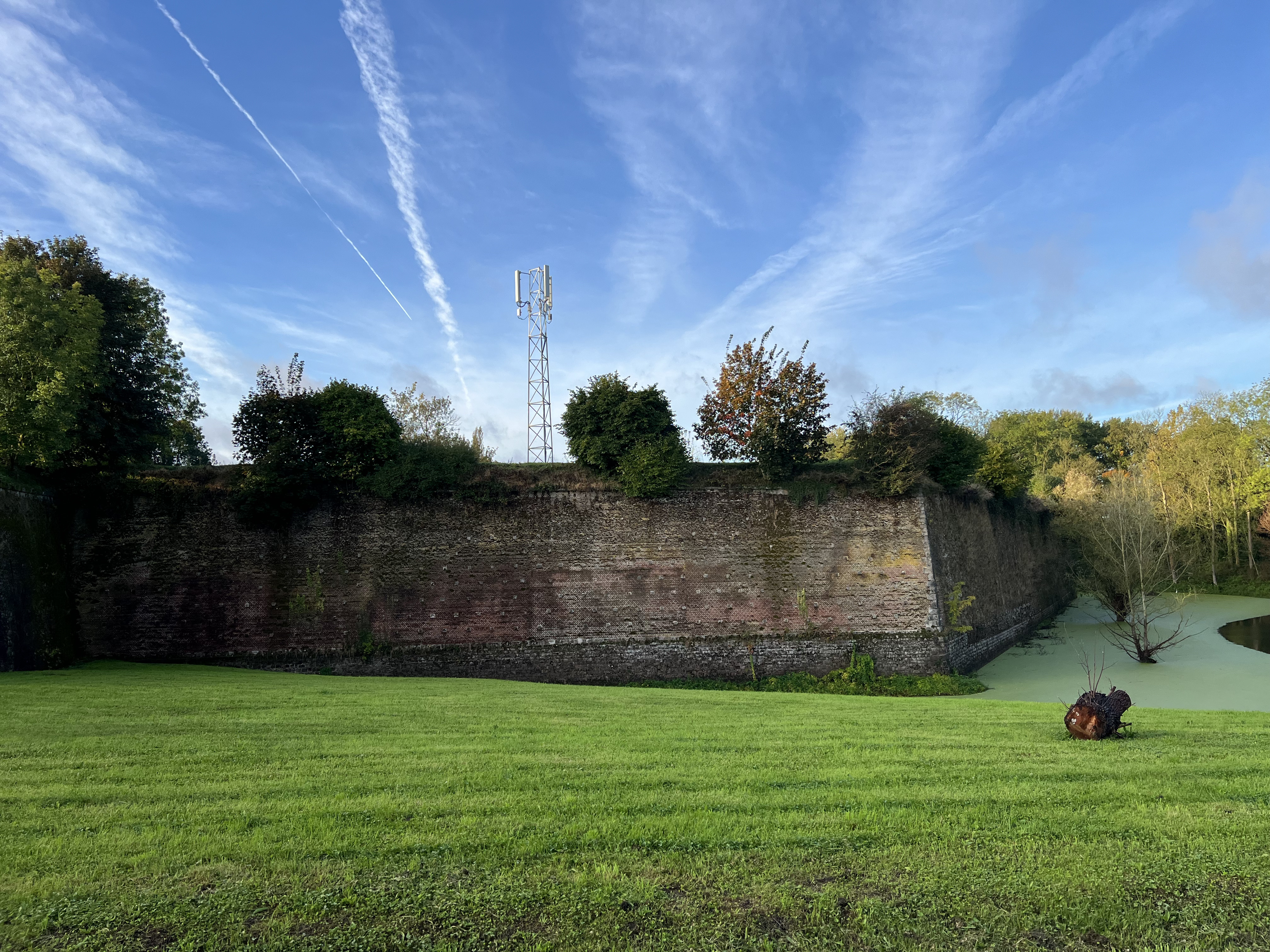
Ramparts of Le Quesnoy, France

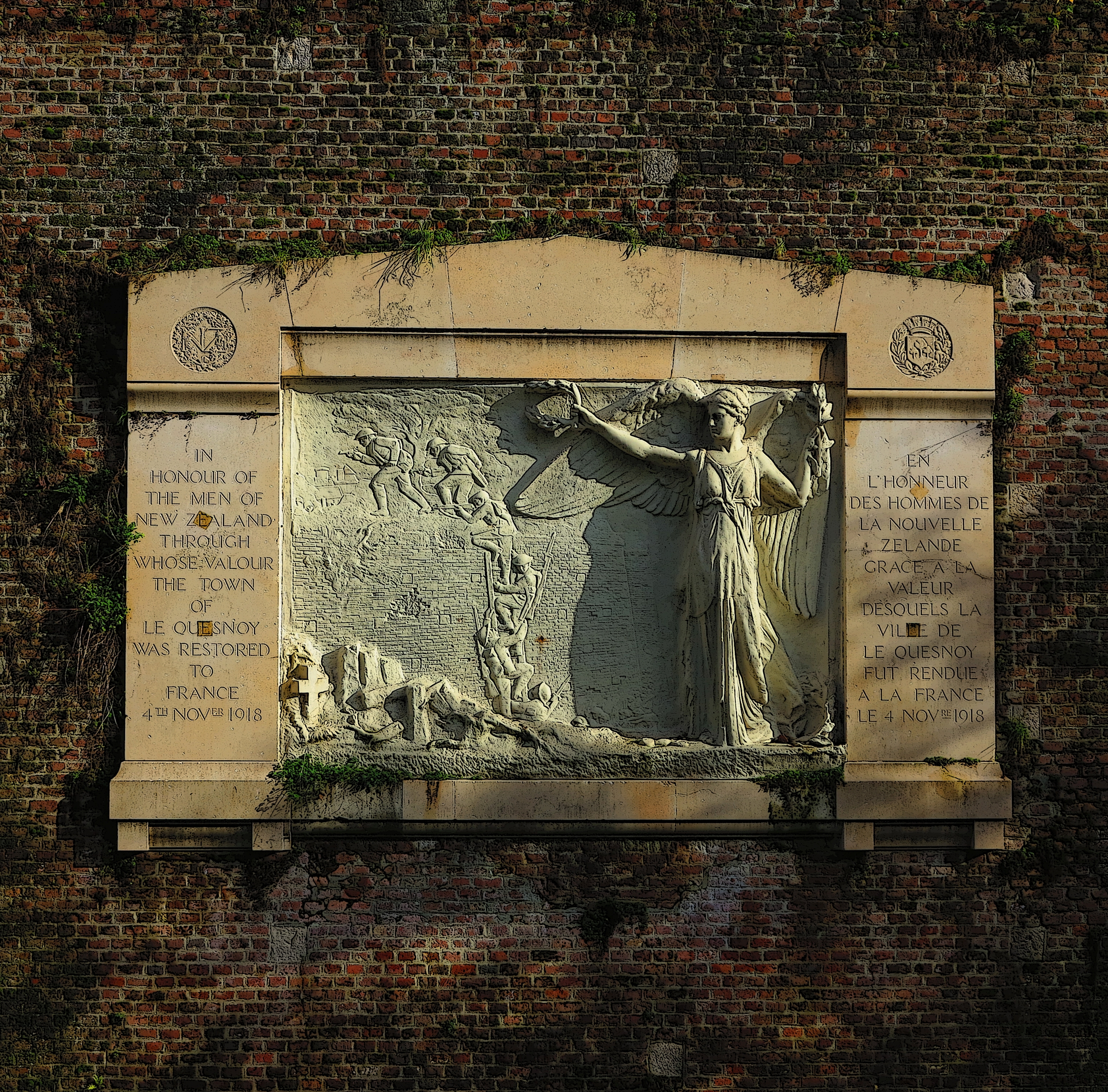
New Zealand Monument in Le Quesnoy, France.

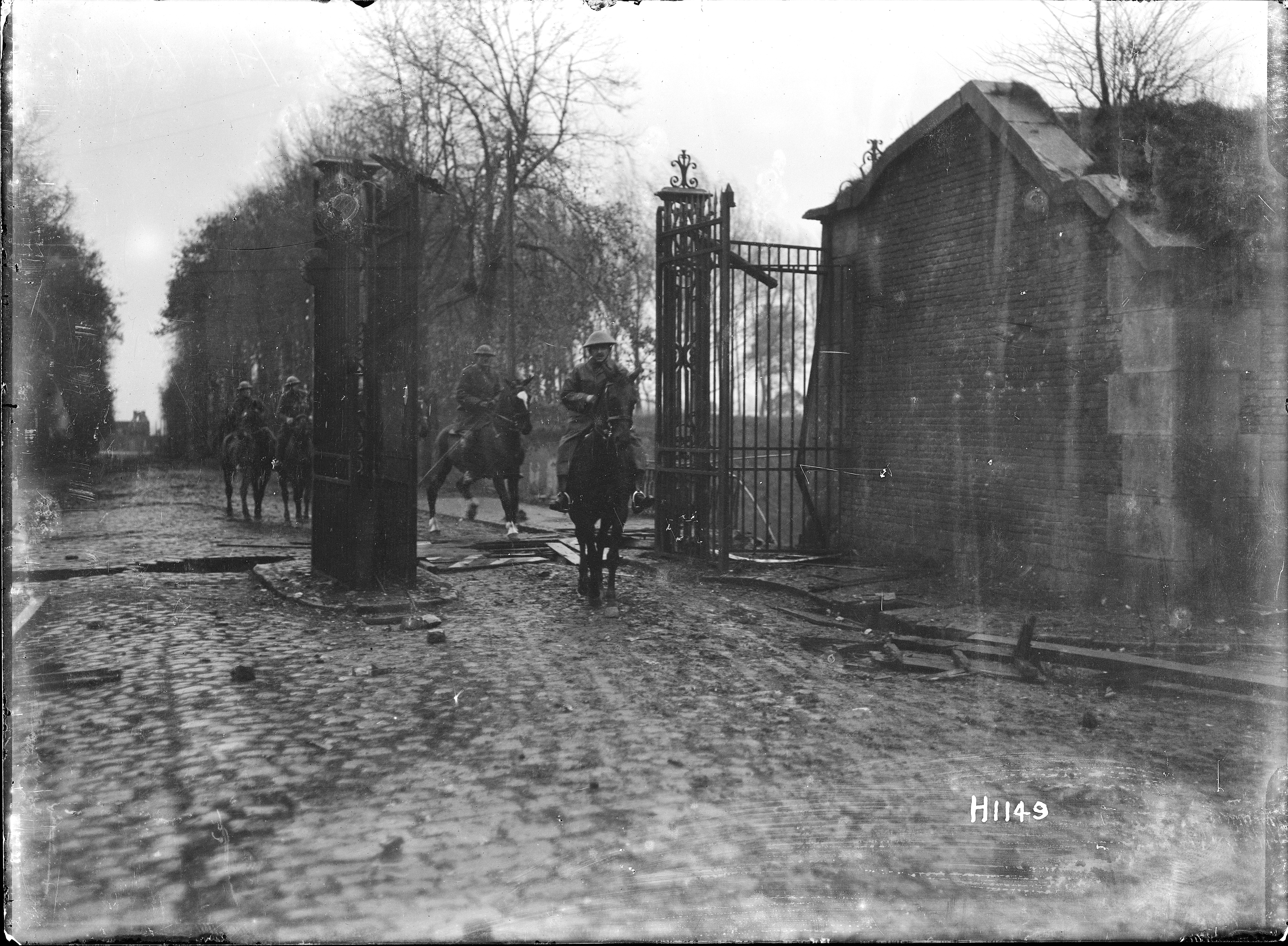
New Zealand Divisional Commander, Major General Russell, entering Le Quesnoy, France, on horseback, in the early morning after its capture during the First World War.

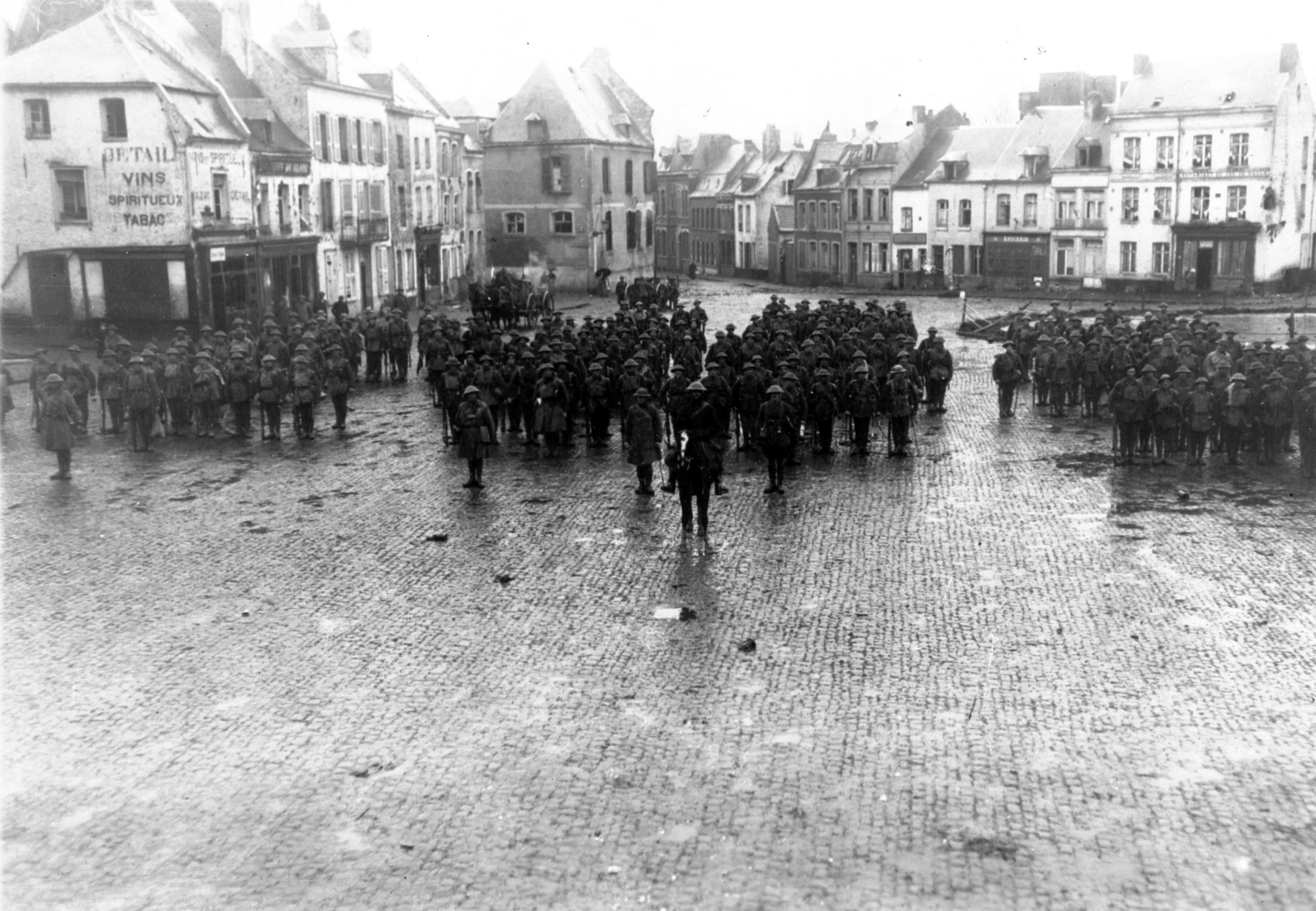
New Zealand soldiers of the 4th Battalion of the New Zealand Rifle Brigade, gathered in the market square of Le Quesnoy the day after the recapture of the town during the First World War.

The actions of the New Zealand Division are noted as the most successful day on the Western Front during the First World War.

Local appreciation is evident in streets being named after New Zealanders and soldiers such as Lieutenant Leslie Averill who climbed the ladder and first set foot in Le Quesnoy. Averill opened the public memorial in 1923, located near where he entered the town, which honours the New Zealand troops. There is also a pre-school, Ecole Maternelle du Dr Averill, in his namesake.

== New Zealand Liberation Museum ==
=== Building & restoration ===
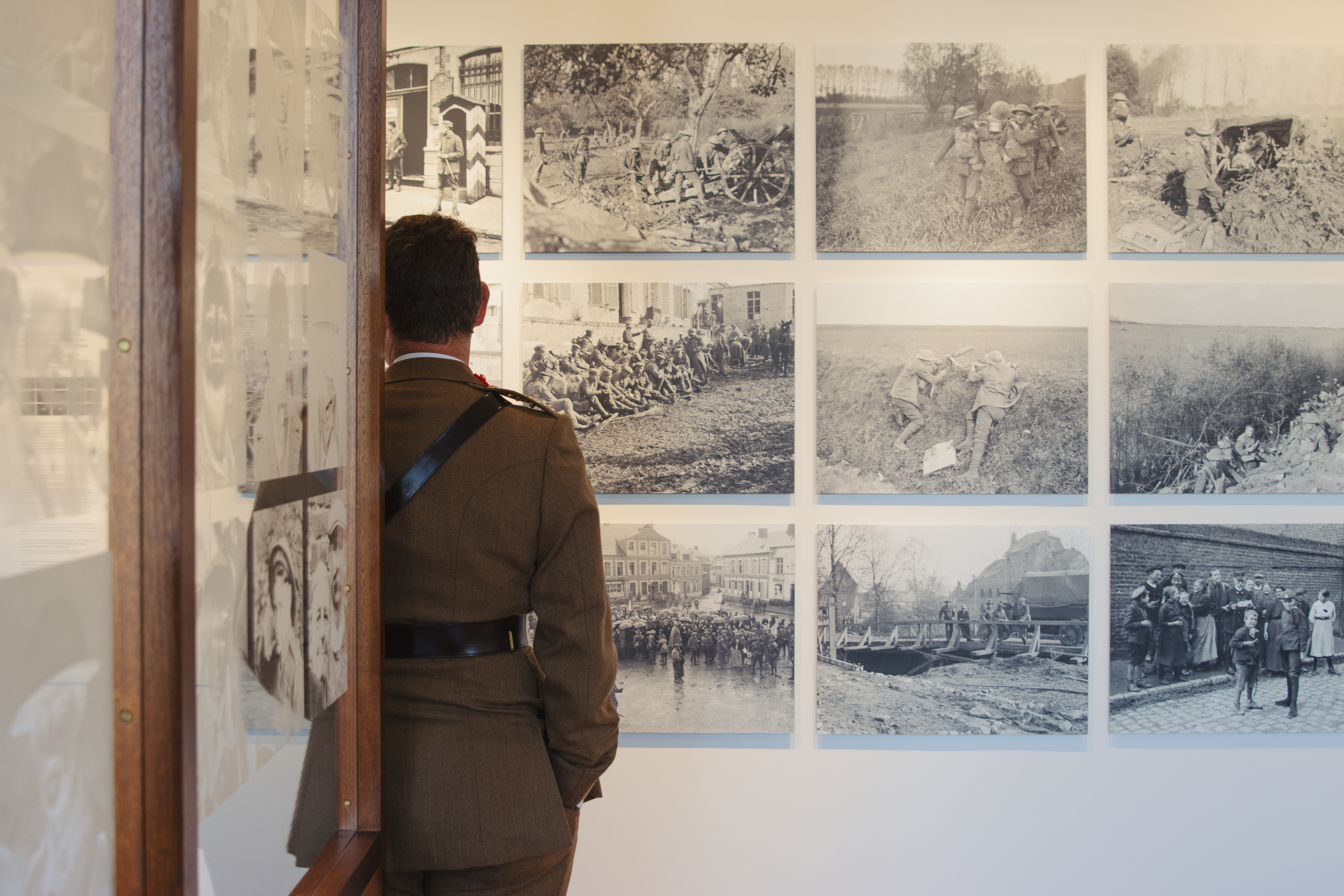
The Room of Views, showcasing wartime photography

The New Zealand Museum Memorial Trust- Le Quesnoy bought the building in 2017. The museum is housed in a restored and refurbished nineteenth century building which was once the Mayor's residence. The museum's architecture utilises modern design alongside traditional elements reflective of the towns historic fortress. This work was done by local architect, Véronique Coupet and New Zealand architect, Robert Hanson, who were in charge of developing the three-storey mansion into a museum. Financial support from philanthropist Andrew Barnes allowed the museum to continue developing. The development of the museum was project managed by Luke van Velthooven.

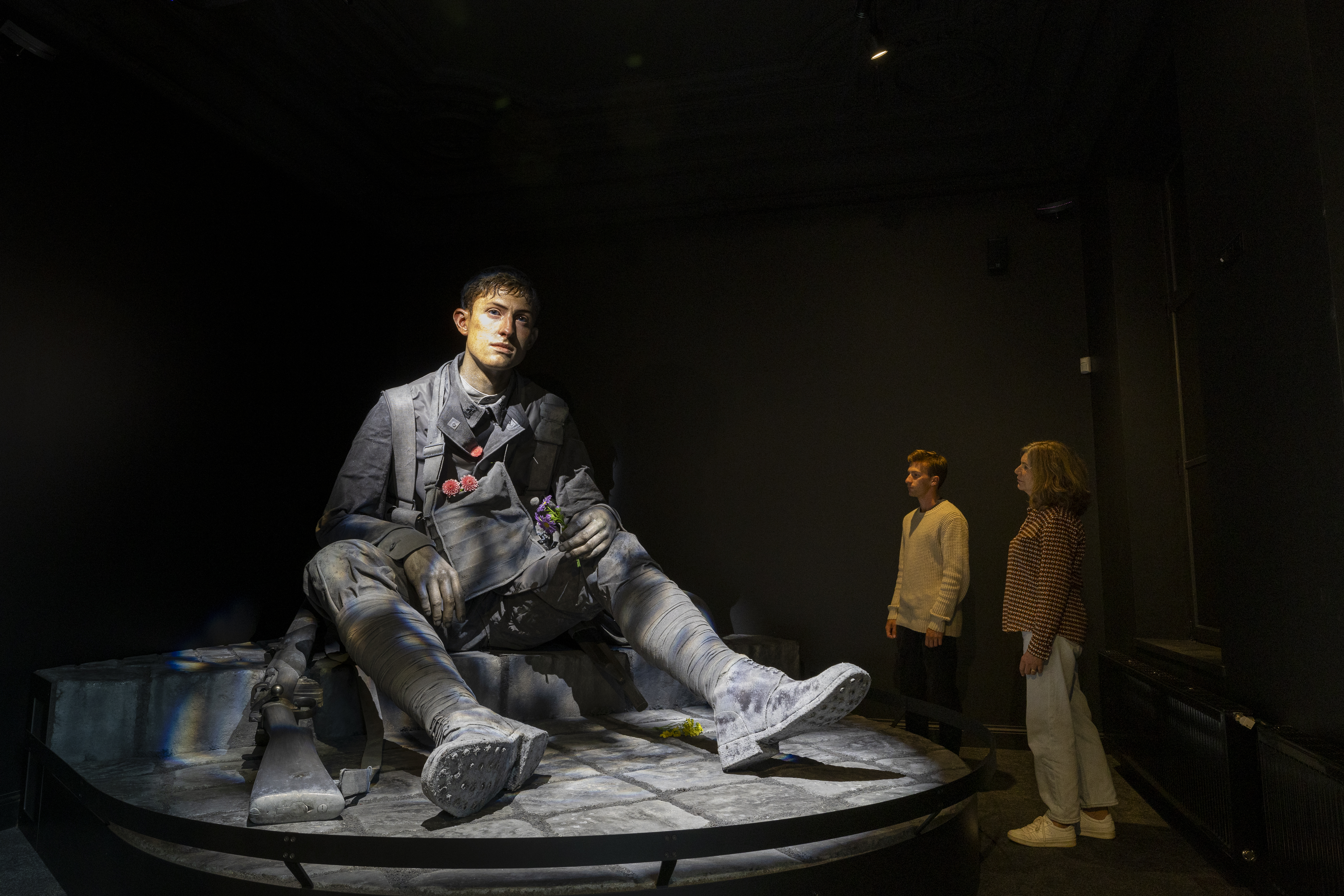
New Zealand Soldier statue at the New Zealand Liberation Museum

=== Opening ===
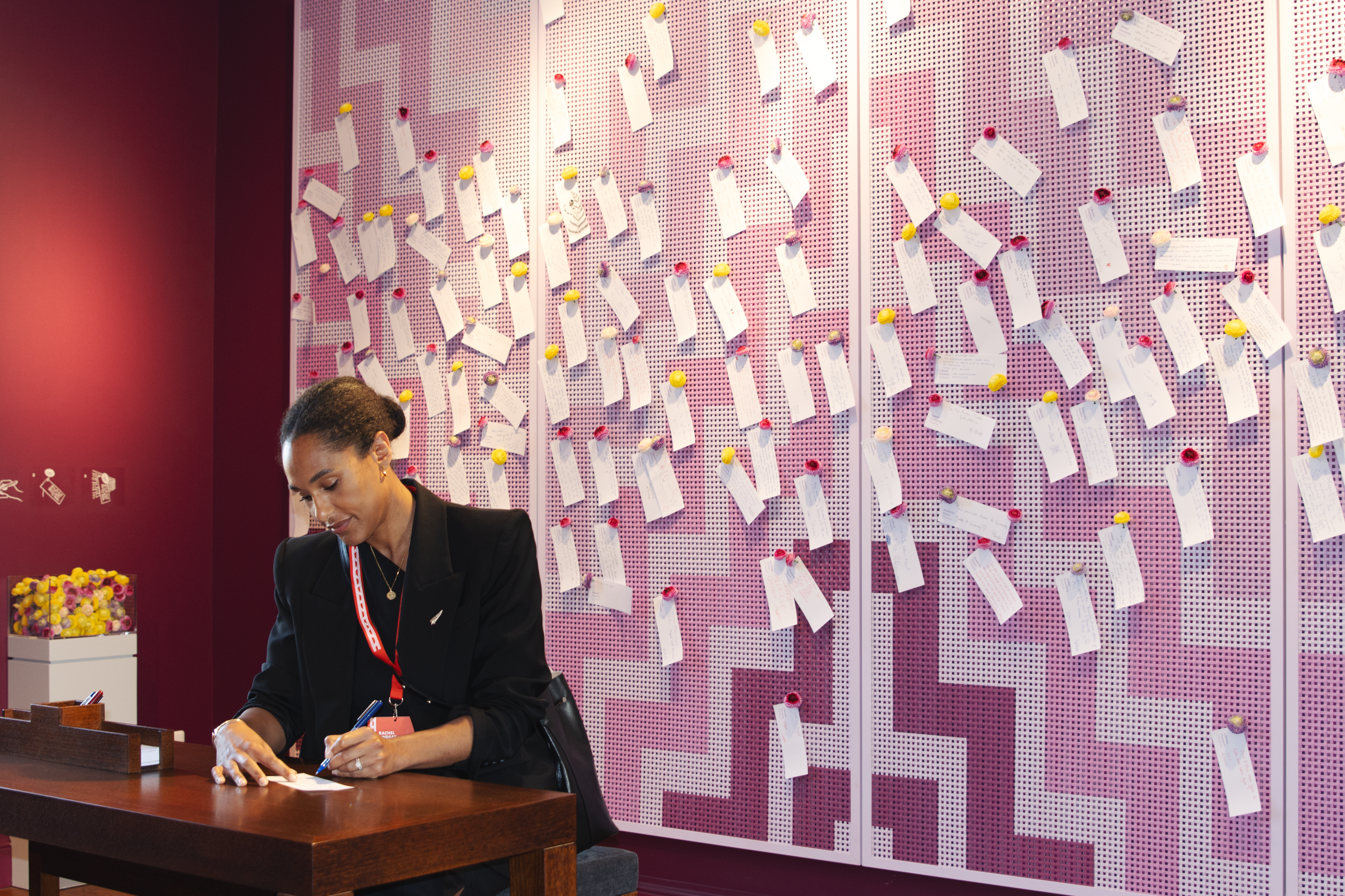
Te Ara Tuku Room, where visitors can leave messages under the themes of Friendship, Freedom and Future

The New Zealand Liberation Museum opened in October 2023, 105 years after New Zealand troops freed Le Quesnoy, near the end of the First World War. The name Te Arawhata means 'the ladder' in Māori, referring to the method New Zealand soldiers took to enter the town. This is also marked in the inclusion of a large ladder sculpture in the centre of the building, designed by Senior Creative Director at Wētā Workshop, Andrew Thomas and New Zealand designer Rehua Wilson.

=== Story & exhibitions ===
The museum tells the story of the capture of Le Quesnoy and New Zealand's involvement in liberating the town through immersive sensory experiences. It also delves into New Zealanders wider involvement in serving in the Western front in The First World War. As well as displaying the realities of life for Le Quesnoy civilians during German occupation. A large-scale and hyper realistic figure of a soldier is exhibited which was created by New Zealand special effects company, Wētā Workshop.
