= Frans Ackerman =

Flemish politician and military leader

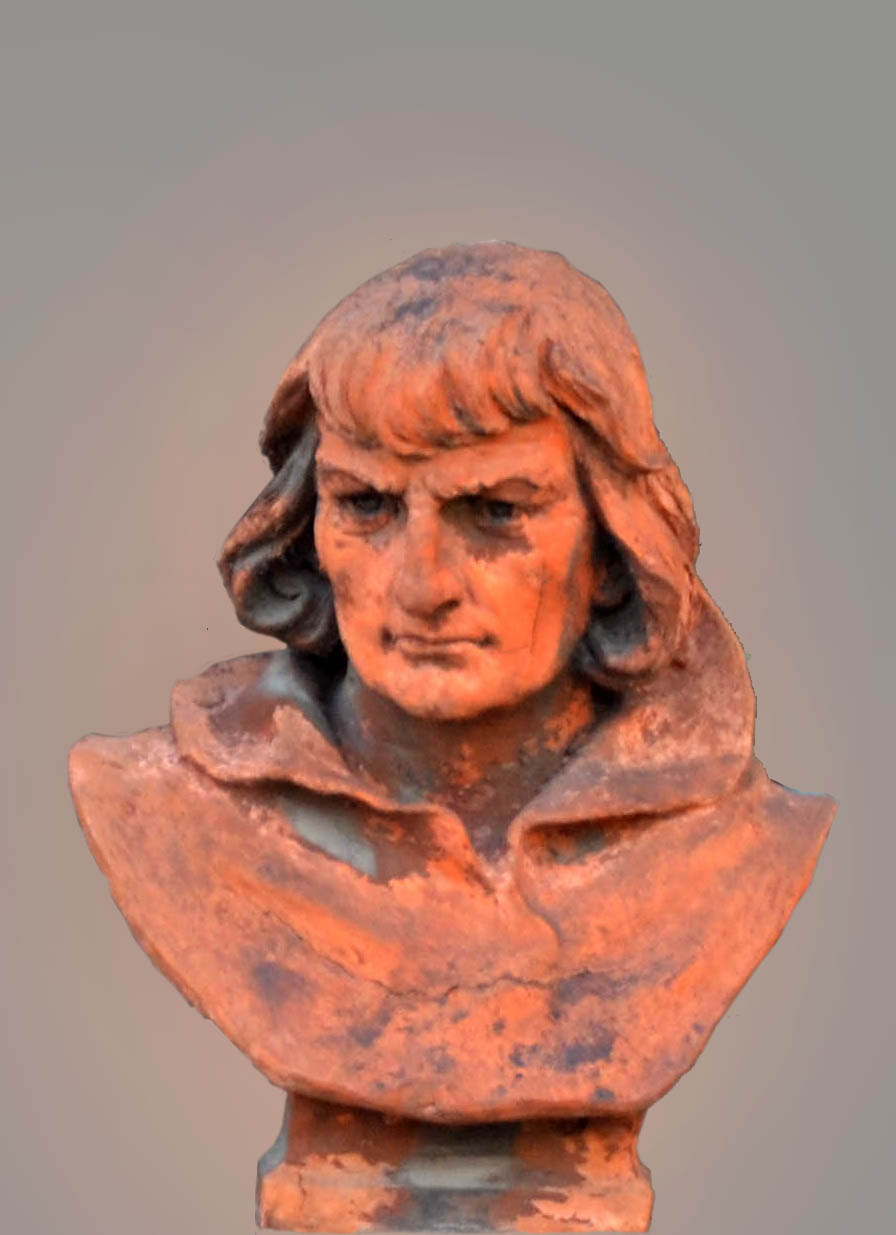
Franz Ackerman

Frans Ackerman (c. 1330–1387), Latinised as Franciscus Agricola, was one of the most famous Flemish statesmen and military leaders of the 14th century.

== Life ==
Ackerman was born in Ghent. Rallying to Philip van Artevelde in the Ghent Revolt of 1379 against Louis II, Count of Flanders, Ackerman was placed in command of the Reisers, a mobile force of 3,000 men responsible for securing the city's supply-lines with Liège, Brussels and Leuven. He distinguished himself in the Battle of Beverhoutsveld (3 May 1382), which led to the taking of Bruges and put almost all of Flanders under the control of Ghent. At the head of some troops, he scoured the surrounding country for provisions and thus saved Ghent from being starved into submission.

With the king of France lending support to the count of Flanders, Ackerman undertook an embassy to England to seek the intervention of King Richard II. During his absence, the rebels suffered a serious defeat in the Battle of Roosebeke (27 November 1382), where Van Artevelde himself was slain. The count regained control of all of Flanders except the city of Ghent, where Ackerman became the rebel leader.

The English launched Despenser's Crusade in 1383, intervening in Flanders under the pretext of enforcing obedience to Pope Urban VI. Ackerman took Aardenburg from a French garrison, sacking the town and carrying the plunder to Ghent, and made an unsuccessful attempt on Bruges. Together with his English allies he was victorious at the Battle of Dunkirk (25 May 1383). He then took Oudenaarde by stratagem.

When the count died in 1384, he was succeeded by Philip the Bold, Duke of Burgundy, who had married the count's daughter, Margaret III, Countess of Flanders. Duke Philip continued the war. Ackerman took the town of Damme in a surprise attack, but was soon besieged within it by the army of Charles VI of France. The expected help from the English not arriving, his force broke out and returned to Ghent.

On 18 December 1385, the war ended with the Peace of Tournai between Ghent and Philip the Bold. Ackerman was a prominent member of the Ghent delegation who agreed the terms, but afterwards declined to serve the duke either at court or in the field.

On 22 July 1387, while on his way to Saint Peter's Abbey, Ghent, Ackerman was murdered by a son of the Lord of Herzele who blamed him for his father's death.
