= Despenser's Crusade =

14th-century military campaign

- Part of the Hundred Years' War and the Western Schism
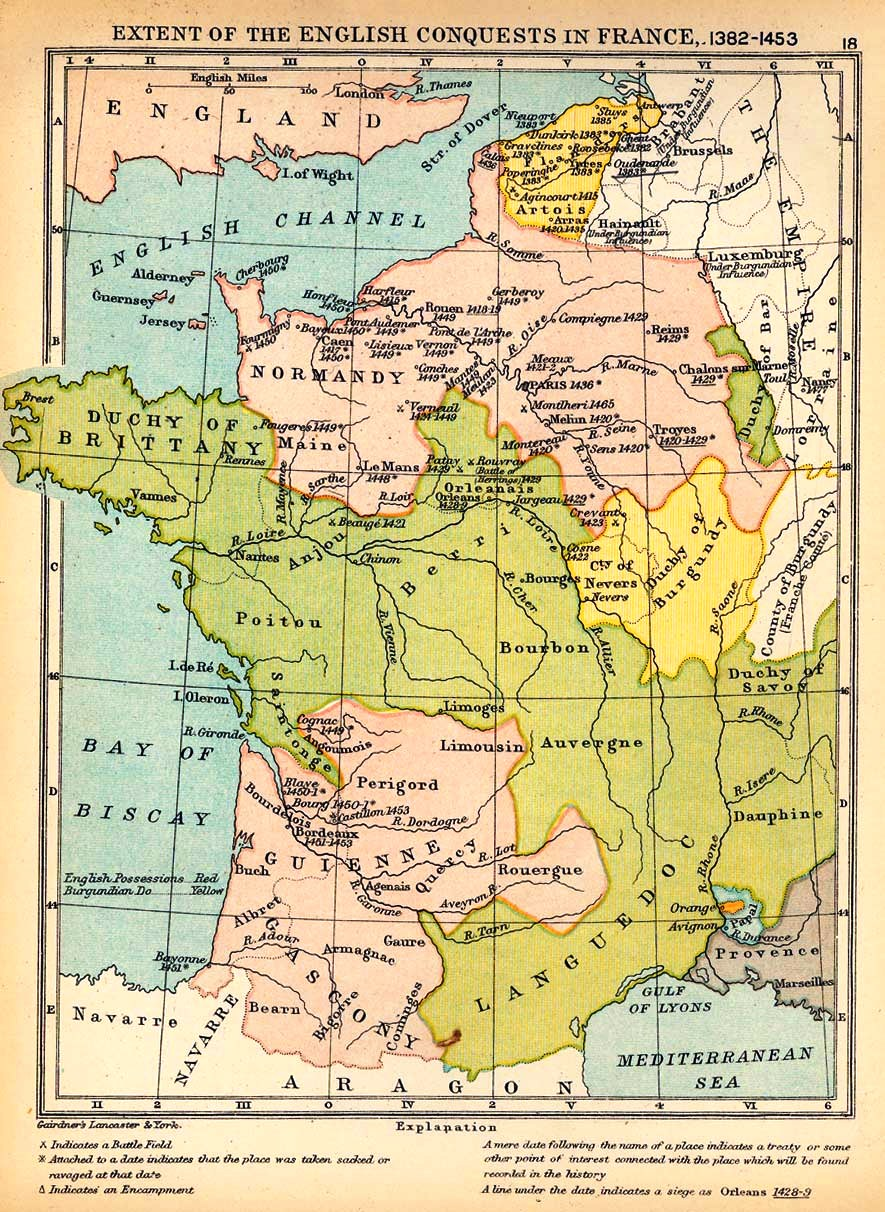
- Map of English conquests in France from 1360 to 1453, shown in pink and in yellow in Flanders
| Date | December 1382 – September 1383 |
| Location | Western Flanders |
| Result | Franco-Flemish victory |

Belligerents
| Kingdom of England; Ghent rebels; Papal States | Kingdom of France; County of Flanders; Avignon Papacy |

Commanders and leaders
| Bishop Henry le Despenser; Frans Ackerman; Pope Urban VI | King Charles VI; Count Louis of Flanders; Antipope Clement VII |

Despenser's Crusade (or the Bishop of Norwich's Crusade, sometimes just Norwich Crusade) was a military expedition led by the English bishop Henry le Despenser in 1383 that aimed to assist the city of Ghent in its struggle against the supporters of Antipope Clement VII. It took place during the great Papal schism and the Hundred Years' War between England and France. While France supported Clement, whose court was based in Avignon, the English supported Pope Urban VI in Rome.

Popular at the time among the lower and middle classes, Despenser's Crusade "was only widely criticised in hindsight", and "for all its canonical propriety, was the Hundred Years' War thinly disguised". Among contemporary critics of the crusade were John Wycliffe and the chronicler Jean Froissart, who charged its leaders with hypocrisy.

== Background ==
=== Flemish revolt ===
The County of Flanders, in which Ghent lay, was an ally of France (part of its territory was in France and part in the Holy Roman Empire). A revolt first broke out in Flanders in September 1379, and the English parliament of 1380, the last to convene at Northampton, recorded that no wool subsidy had been received because of the "present riot" in Flanders. Wool was a major English export to the Flemish looms, and between the fiscal years of 1381–82 and 1382–83 total exports dropped from 18,000 to 11,000 sacks. In 1382–83, only 2,192 sacks passed through the main English staple port of Calais, leading to the rise of Middelburg in competition.

When the citizens of Ghent rebelled against the count, Louis de Male, in January 1382, they requested English assistance. Louis attempted to block English imports. Under the leadership of Philip van Artevelde the Flemings expelled Louis from Flanders at the Battle of Beverhoutsveld and took Bruges. Louis soon procured a French army to relieve him, and the militia of Ghent was decisively defeated at the Battle of Roosebeke on 27 November, where Philip was killed. The city was forced to accept Louis's terms, to acknowledge Clement as the legitimate pope and to aid in the fight against the English. The fleet of Ghent escaped to England, where it kept up the war, while the rebel commander Frans Ackerman sought to negotiate English support for their cause. Charles VI of France entered Bruges and confiscated all the English merchants' goods.

Coat of arms of John of Gaunt, demonstrating his claim to rule Castile (denoted by the castles) and León (denoted by the purple lions). He championed a crusade to Spain in opposition to Despenser's crusade.

=== Parliamentary debate ===
In October 1383, Parliament convened to debate the financing of a crusade. One side, led by John of Gaunt, put forward a crusade to establish him on the throne of Castile, and gained the support of the upper chamber, the later House of Lords. The other side, led by the Courtenays, the Earl of Arundel and the Earl of Buckingham, argued for a campaign to relieve Ghent and was supported by the lower chamber—the later House of Commons. These were "two noble ways" (deux noble chymyns) to aid the king's friends (the Flemish communes, and the Portuguese in the midst of a succession crisis) against his enemies.

The former option, the way of Portugal (chemin de Portyngale), was a pet project of John of Gaunt's. He had formally claimed the throne of Castile since at least 30 January 1372, when he received royal permission to include the arms of Castile and León on his own coat of arms. Edmund of Langley, John's brother, led a disastrous military campaign in Portugal in favour of John's claim in 1379. In January or February 1380, Ferdinand I of Portugal declared for Clement, but then on 29 August 1381 he went over to Urban's camp. Then, in March 1382, Urban issued the bull Regimini sacrosancte, condemning the Castilian king, Henry II, as a schismatic. During the parliamentary debate, John Gilbert, Bishop of Hereford, pointed out that while France remained within the Catholic fold, formally, Despenser's crusade would have to be a general effort against the Clementists, while John of Gaunt's could proceed against the excommunicated king of Castile, specifically.

The latter option, the "way of Flanders", was cheaper and of more immediate military value, for it could relieve the pressure on the English-held port of Calais. Parliament approved funding and appointed Henry le Despenser, the Bishop of Norwich, as leader of the crusade, although it appears the crusade was initially to be led by John of Gaunt or another of the king's uncles. The bishop refused to accept Arundel as his lieutenant and secular leader of the expedition. Some peers criticised the crusade as threatening Richard II's claim on France, citing the way in which Urban VI had tried to control Naples after its successful defence against the Clementist Louis of Anjou's expedition in 1381.

== Planning and organisation ==
=== Papal and ecclesiastical ===
As early as 1378, the Cardinal Pietro Pileo di Prata expressed hope that through Richard II's marriage to Anne of Bohemia, an anti-French alliance between England and the Holy Roman Empire could be forged. The Bohemians, however, refused to go to war with France unless the nation was excommunicated, a measure Urban found too extreme.

In 1379 Despenser published the bull Nuper cum vinea (6 November 1378) of Urban VI offering plenary indulgences to both the living and the dead in return for contributions proportional to or consistent with the donor's wealth to the general crusade against the Clementists. (Women generally gave jewellery and household effects.) In March 1381, by two bulls, Urban appointed Despenser in charge of the anti-Clementist crusade in England, and gave him the power to grant indulgences and to dispense priests to participate. This was probably a result of the diplomatic work of his clerk, Henry Bowet, who had gone to Rome on royal business in February 1380. The two bulls he delivered to Despenser, Dudum cum vinea Dei (23 March) and Dudum cum filii Belial (25 March), survive in several copies. A further bull, Dignum censemus, of 15 May empowered Despenser to preach the crusade in both archdioceses of England, Canterbury and York, and to take action against opponents of his message.

These three bulls reached England in August 1381, and copies were distributed to the English episcopate on 17 September. Despenser "at once", according to Ranulf Higden's Polychronicon, sent out his collectors to receive donations in return for the granting of indulgences. They were wildly successful, especially among commoners, perhaps because of the economic benefit of restoring order to Flanders, with which England had extensive trade. On 21 December 1382, in Old St Paul's Cathedral in London, the bishop of Norwich took the cross and formally vowed to go on the crusade.

While the crusade was preached by friars, false confessors went about extorting money, while some legitimate priests refused to hand over their collections to the war chest. The corruption inspired a series of denunciations from the reformer John Wyclif. Despenser, however, promised that the crusade would only attack the supporters of the "schismatic" antipope, and:

if within the year it should happen that the realm of France was converted to the faith of the true Pope Urban, the bishop should be bound to fold up and put away the banner of the crusade, and thenceforth to serve our lord the king under his [the king's] own colours [in some other theatre].

=== Royal and parliamentary ===
The exchequer saw to the procurement of bows and arrows. The public finances were overseen by Despenser's treasurer, Robert Foulmere, and by a London merchant, Sir John Philpot, who also acted as the expedition's banker. With his private money he funded some recruits and their transport across the Channel. The ceremony whereat Despenser took the cross was characterised by the standard pageantry, "the cross and the crusade banner, and the sermons, masses, processions, and confessions".

Despenser appointed as captains of the crusade Hugh Calveley, William Elmham, Thomas Tryvet, John Ferris, Hugh Despenser, William Ferinton and Matthew Reedman. The crusade attracted a large number of recruits, but it also attracted undesirable (and uninvited, according to the Westminster Chronicle) volunteers: bored monks with no fighting ability, youthful apprentices of the London guilds and outright criminals. The crusaders who had taken the proper vows wore red crosses, which symbol was already being transformed into the English national banner. At the last moment, according to the historian Thomas of Walsingham, there was an effort to prevent the crusade's departure. King Richard II, who was advocating peace with France, ordered Despenser to await the arrival of William de Beauchamp, an experienced general, but the bishop ignored him.

== Campaign ==
The crusade was mustered at Sandwich on 27 April, and sailed for Calais on 16 May 1383. The chronology of the crusade from the sailing until 25 May is provided in a letter Despenser wrote to another prelate. The first crusaders to arrive at Calais stayed only a few days, before the entire force had crossed the channel. The bishop led them in a successful attack on Gravelines. That month (May 1383), on the home front, one Thomas Depham of Norfolk was imprisoned for casting doubt on an official report from Flanders.

=== Siege of Ypres ===
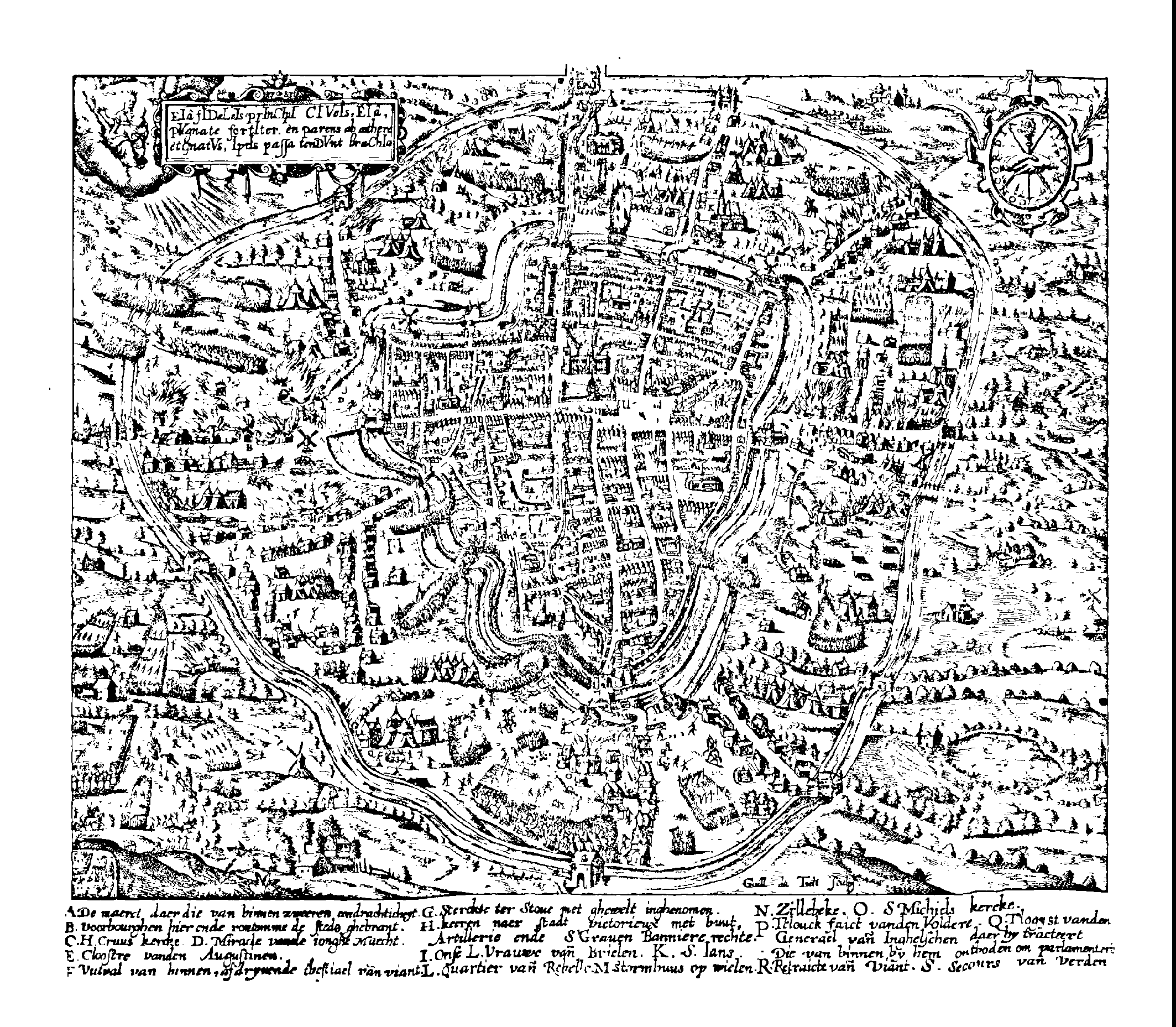
Ypres during the Bishop of Norwich's siege. The illustration, a reproduction of an engraving published in 1610, shows the siege in progress.

The crusade joined the militia of Ghent in June. There was some debate over whether to attack Bruges or Ypres in Flanders, or to invade France, "the worst schimastic", as one historian puts it. The army decided to besiege Ypres, which was in fact an Urbanist city. Walsingham nevertheless describes the crusaders using typical but entirely misplaced rhetoric:

Having the banner of the Holy Cross before them [they] thought that victory in this cause was glory but death reward... [T]hose who suffered death would be martyrs ... and thus the blessing of the cross was achieved, and the crucesignati [cross-signed] gloriously captured the town and there destroyed the enemies of the cross so that not one of them remained alive.

At Ypres the problem of the unpaid "volunteers" was exacerbated under siege conditions. In June Despenser ordered "all who are not in receipt of official wages" to return to England. These undisciplined elements had only joined the host for the opportunity of plunder, according to Walsingham.

From Flanders, some of the captains wrote to the king that the campaign was falling apart "for lack of a lieutenant and of the good government of [the bishop]." According to the transcript of the bishop's later trial, the king negotiated for Arundel to gather a group of men-at-arms and archers and go to Flanders, but the "ambiguously written" letters of Despenser, and reports of speeches he had made, indicated that he would not accept a lieutenant. When a French relieving force approached the town, Despenser decided to abandon the siege on 8 August, after eight weeks of effort. Calveley suggested turning towards Clementist France, but the leadership of the crusade then split. Despenser, who claimed at his trial to have supported an attack on France only to be opposed by the majority of his captains, took his forces to Gravelines, while the remaining captains were bribed to surrender the land they had conquered and go home.

=== Truce ===
After burning Gravelines, which he had wanted to hold, Despenser made a deal with the French and sailed his army home by September. He later claimed that the restlessness of the 6,000–7,000 evacuees from the other surrendered towns and his lack of provisions, with the truce set to expire in a few days, forced his hand. He had in fact received royal permission to evacuate if he was short of victuals. At the time of the truce, the king:

had appointed his uncle of Spain [John of Gaunt] to come quickly to [Despenser's] aid and support. And none the less, [Despenser] departed from there, leaving the same town to the enemy, contrary to the form of [his] indenture.

The truce, so it was alleged by Despenser's opponents, was due "to the coming of our lord the king and my lord of Lancaster [John of Gaunt], who was by the sea, ready to cross" at the time.

== Aftermath ==
Upon returning, Despenser and his captains were summoned by the chancellor, Michael de la Pole, at the insistence of parliament, which opened on 26 October.

=== Impeachment of Despenser ===
At the end of the proceedings, which took place before king and parliament, the bishop was impeached, deprived of his temporalities for two years, on the basis "of several matters, but especially of four articles". These four articles were the main allegations put against him by de la Pole. The first two alleged that although he was pledged "to serve the king in his wars of France" with 2,500 men-at-arms and an equal number of archers mustered at Calais for the period of a year, his force did not meet that quota, there was no muster of the whole at Calais and the force had returned and been disbanded after less than six months. The other two articles accused Despenser of refusing to abide by the condition that he take with him "the best and most sufficient captains of the realm, after royalties"—a condition he got around by refusing to name his captains until after permission for his expedition was already granted, and by deceiving the king through "beaux promesses" in order to retain complete control of military matters (and avoiding taking Arundel with him).

Despenser defended himself by claiming that the siege of Ypres was advised by the men of Ghent, that losses to both his own forces and those of Ghent (an "act of God", aventure de Dieux) had forced his lifting the siege, and the truce with the French might be preliminary to a lasting peace. He further claimed that he had more than quota of forces at Ypres, even though they had not all assembled at Calais; and that although Lord Neville had offered to go in the king's very presence Richard had refused permission. He admitted to having received in Flanders royal letters asking him to accept a lieutenant, to which he claimed to have replied asking king and council to appoint one. After being found guilty, Despenser asked the king for a hearing before parliament to present his defence without interruption, which was granted for 24 November. In his final defence, the bishop attempted to place some blame on his captains, but Michael de la Pole was given another opportunity to rebut him. His guilt was confirmed, and although he had acted "contrary to the common custom of the estate of [a] prelate of England", Richard II offered to treat him as an ecclesiastic. His temporalities were suspended and he was fined for the entire public cost of the expedition, to be paid for out of the francs he had received in France.

=== Punishment of the captains ===
The captains of the crusade were asked to answer allegations of receiving bribes totalling 18,000 gold francs. The leaders did not deny the allegations, but argued that because they had been forced to leave behind valuable horses the money was compensation. The treasurer, Foulmere, and five of the captains (notably, not Calveley) were imprisoned and fined 14,600 gold francs. On 9 January 1384, the exchequer recorded the receipt of £287 9s. 4d. of money captured during the Flemish expedition, paid by one Henry Bowet on Foulmere's behalf, and the further receipt of £770 16s. 8d. for 5,000 francs "illicitly received" overseas.
