= Siege of Ypres (1383) =

Military action in 1383

- Part of Despenser's Crusade and the Revolt of Ghent (1379–1385)
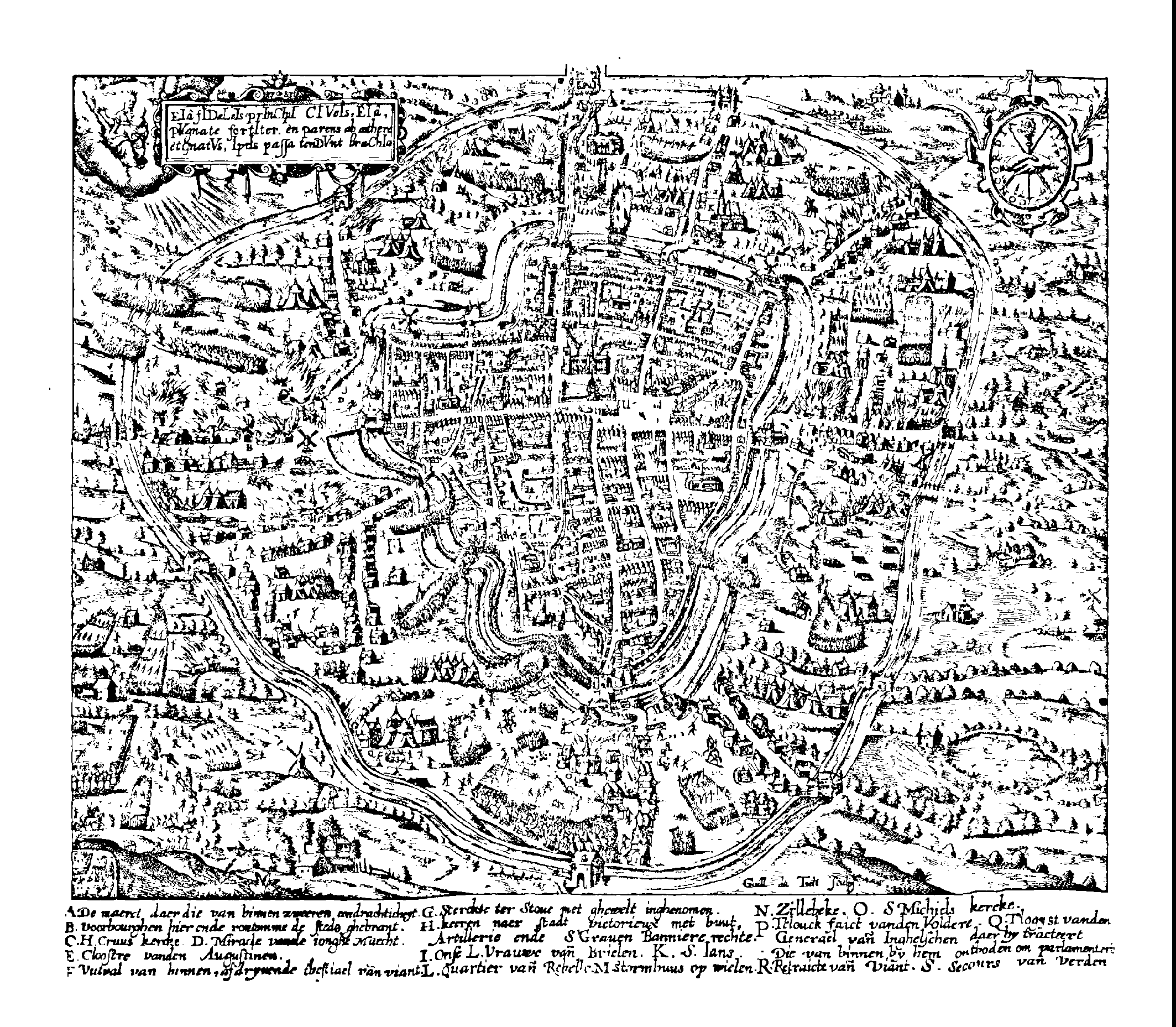
- Ypres during the Bishop of Norwich's siege. The illustration, a reproduction of an engraving published in 1610, shows the siege in progress
Date	8 June–8 August 1383
Location	Ypres (Ieper), Flanders 50°51′00″N 2°53′00″E
Result	Ypres successfully defends

Belligerents
City of Ypres; County of Flanders; Kingdom of France	Kingdom of England; Ghent rebels

Commanders and leaders
John d'Oultre; Louis II of Flanders	Henry le Despenser

Strength
~20,000	Unknown

Casualties and losses
Unknown	Unknown

The siege of Ypres occurred between 8 June and 8 August 1383 as part of Despenser's Crusade and the Revolt of Ghent (1379–1385). It was conducted by English forces and forces from the Flemish city of Ghent. The siege was a failure.

== Prelude ==
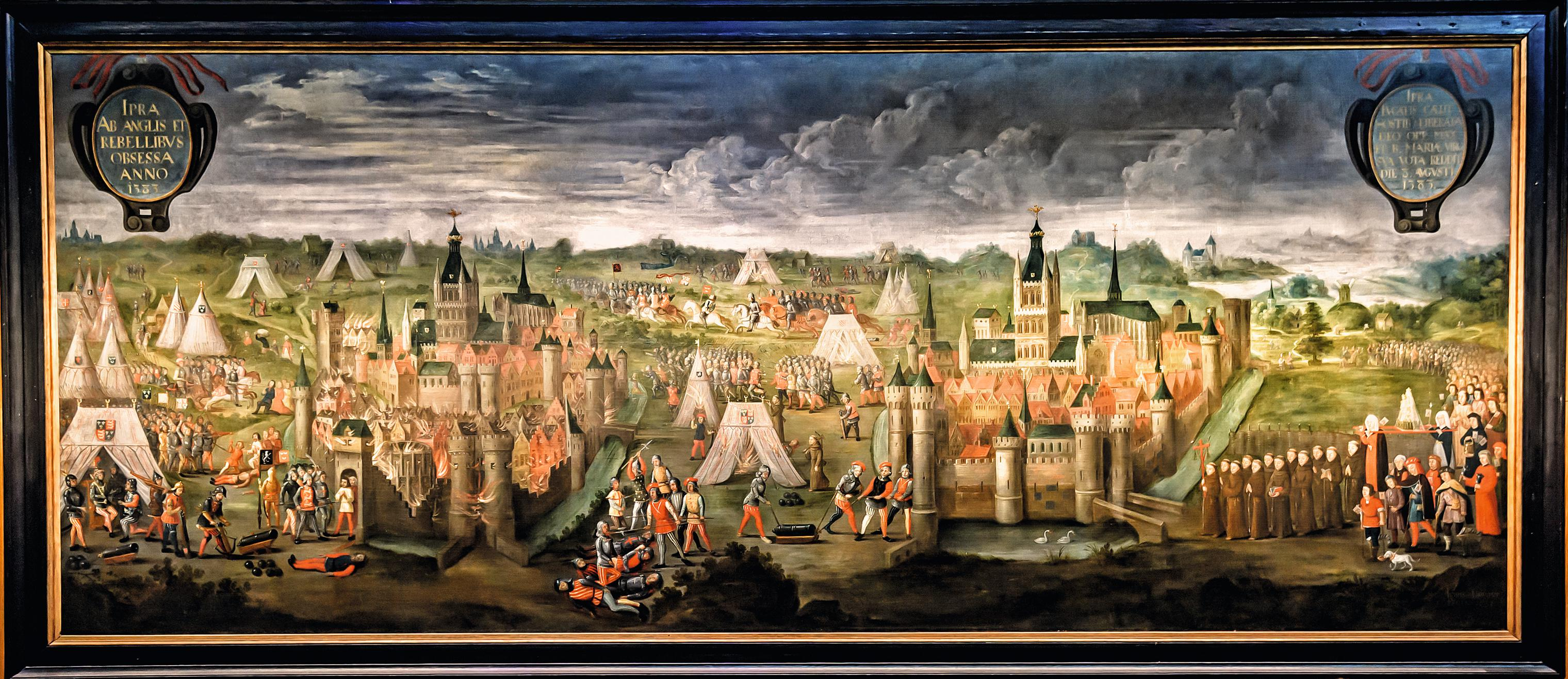
Siege of Ypres (Joris Liebaert)

The city of Ghent in the County of Flanders rebelled in September 1379 against its count Louis of Male, who supported France against England in the Hundred Years' War, which was against the economic interests of Flanders. After their defeat at the Battle of Roosebeke in November 1382, the citizens of Ghent requested English assistance, and the English sent a force under Henry le Despenser, the Bishop of Norwich.

The English landed at Calais in May 1383 and took Gravelines, Dunkirk, Poperinge, and Nieuwpoort. On 25 May the crusaders put to flight a Franco-Flemish army, under the command of Louis of Male, in a pitched battle fought near Dunkirk. Despenser was then persuaded by his Ghent allies and some of his officers to besiege Ypres, which had remained loyal to the count and to France.

== Siege ==
The inhabitants of Ypres were well prepared for a siege by the time the English and their allies arrived and attacked the city on 8 June 1383. Dwellings in the outlying suburbs had been abandoned; the timber from them was used to strengthen the earth ramparts and the stone gates of the city. A mission had been dispatched to Paris to replace artillery powder stocks. The city was well-organised under the command of the Castellan of Ypres, John d'Oultre, and had been divided into different defensive sectors. Although the ramparts were low, they were well protected with a double wet ditch, a high thorny hedge reinforced with stakes, and a wooden stockade and fire-step.

The English attacked the Temple Gate on the first day but were beaten off. Over the next three days the city gates were attacked simultaneously, without success. Before the end of the first week of the siege, reinforcements arrived to completely encircle the city walls and the outer ditch was breached using soil. On the eighth day (15 June) Despenser attacked the defences with artillery, firing on the Messines Gate and damaging it, but not enough to cause the city defences to be breached. Over the following days of the siege, sustained artillery attacks had little overall effect and the assaults of Despenser's troops were all beaten off. An attempt to drain the ditches seriously threatened the citizens of Ypres, but the attempt was unsuccessful and the besieged managed to communicate with the Duke of Burgundy through Louis of Male, who was able to raise a large French army to come to the aid of the city. On 8 August, after nine weeks of effort, Despenser abruptly decided to abandon the siege, as did his Ghent allies on September 10.

In Ypres, the victory was attributed to the intervention of Our Lady of the Enclosure, in whose honour an annual procession has since been held on the first Sunday in August.

== Aftermath ==
After the débâcle at Ypres, the bishop and Sir Hugh Calveley wished to advance into France, but Sir William Elmham, Trivet and some of the other commanders refused to go. The bishop was obliged by the approaching French army to fall back upon Gravelines. The demoralised and disease-ridden English forces were bribed to evacuate Gravelines and Despenser ordered it to be sacked. By the end of October the remaining crusaders had returned across the English Channel.

Ghent continued its revolt, until it concluded the Peace of Tournai in 1385 with Philip the Bold, the successor of Louis of Male.

Ypres never really recovered from this siege. The entire hinterland of the city had been destroyed and the trade with England was seriously compromised. The decline of the city continued further and the population of the city dropped from 20,000 in 1383 to only 7,600 by the end of the 15th century.
