= Hundred Years' War, 1369–1389 =

Second phase of the Hundred Years' War

Caroline War (1369–1389)
- Part of the Hundred Years' War
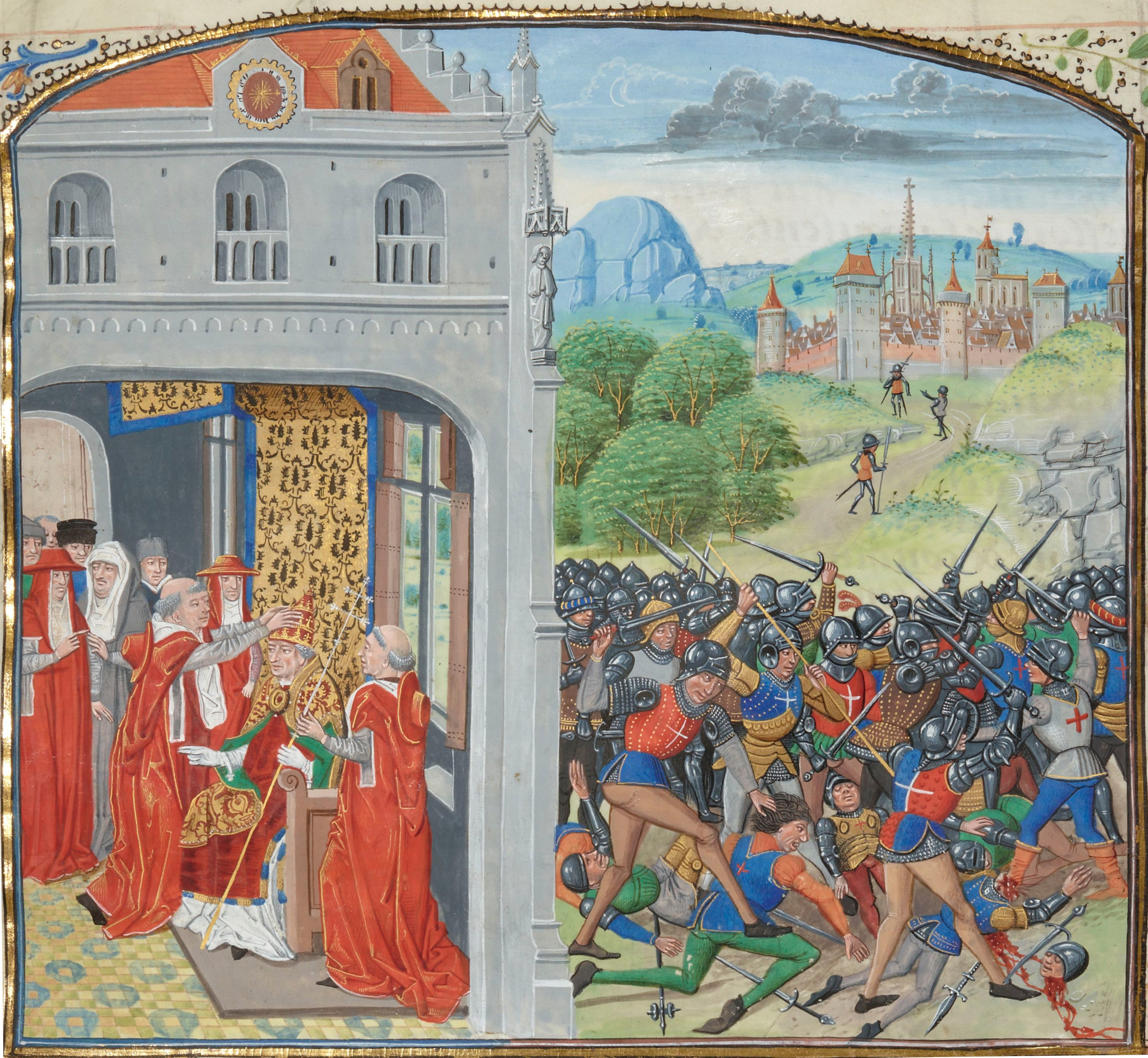
- The Battle of Pontvallain
Date	1369–1389
Location	France
Result	French victory: Truce of Leulinghem in 1389; War resumes in 1415

Belligerents
Kingdom of France: County of Flanders; Duchy of Burgundy; Kingdom of Scotland Duchy of Brittany Crown of Castile	Kingdom of England: Principality of Wales; Duchy of Gascony; Duchy of Aquitaine; Kingdom of Navarre; Kingdom of Portugal (1381–1382, 1383 –1385) Ghent rebels (1383–85)	Ghent rebels (1379–1383)

Commanders and leaders
Charles V # Charles VI; Bertrand du Guesclin # Olivier de Clisson; Jean de Vienne; Philip the Bold; Robert II; Louis de Sancerre Ambrosio Boccanegra #	Edward III # Richard II; The Black Prince # John of Gaunt; Edmund of Langley; John Hastings # Jean III de Grailly (surrendered) # Robert Knolles; Ferdinand I of Portugal; João Afonso Telo, 6th Count of Barcelos; Nuno Álvares Pereira John, Grandmaster of Avis	Philip van Artevelde †; Frans Ackerman Jan Hyoens

The Caroline War was the second phase of the Hundred Years' War between France and England, following the Edwardian War. It was named after Charles V of France, who resumed the war nine years after the Treaty of Brétigny (1360). In this part of the conflict, the Crown of Castile emerges as a supporter of France. The Kingdom of France dominated this phase of the war.

The Black Prince, eldest son and heir of Edward III of England, spent a huge sum of money in order to restore Peter the Cruel to the throne of Castile. The Castilian King was unable to repay him, however, so the Black Prince raised taxes in his domains in Aquitaine. The people's complaints were unheeded, so they appealed to the French King Charles V. In May 1369, the Black Prince received summons from the French king demanding his presence in Paris. The prince refused, and Charles responded by declaring war. He immediately set out to reverse the territorial losses imposed at Brétigny and he was largely successful in his lifetime. His successor, Charles VI, made peace with the son of the Black Prince, Richard II, in 1389. This truce was extended many times until the war was resumed in 1415.

== Background ==
In the Treaty of Brétigny, Edward III renounced his claim to the French throne in exchange for the duchy of Aquitaine in full sovereignty. During the nine years of formal peace between the two kingdoms, the English and French clashed in Brittany and Castile.

In the War of the Breton Succession, the English backed the heir male, the House of Montfort (a cadet of the House of Dreux, itself a cadet of the Capetian dynasty) while the French backed the heir general, the House of Blois. Since Brittany allowed female succession, the French considered the Blois side to be the rightful heir. The war began in 1341, but the English continued backing the Montforts even after the Peace of Brétigny. The English-supported claimant John of Montfort defeated and killed the French claimant, Charles of Blois, at the Battle of Auray in 1364. By that time, however, Edward III no longer had a claim to the throne of France, so John had to accept the suzerainty of the French king in order to hold his duchy in peace. Thus, the English derived no benefit from their victory. In fact, the French received the benefit of improved generalship in the person of the Breton commander Bertrand du Guesclin, who, leaving Brittany, entered the service of Charles and became one of his most successful generals.

With peace in France, the mercenaries and soldiers lately employed in the war became unemployed, and turned to plundering. Charles V also had a score to settle with Pedro the Cruel, King of Castile, who married his sister-in-law, Blanche of Bourbon, and had her poisoned. Charles V ordered Du Guesclin to lead these bands to Castile to depose Pedro the Cruel. The Castilian Civil War ensued. Du Guesclin succeeded in his object; Henry of Trastámara was placed on the Castilian throne.

Having been opposed by the French, Pedro appealed to the Black Prince for aid, promising rewards. The Black Prince succeeded in restoring Pedro following the Battle of Nájera. But Pedro refused to make payments, to the chagrin of his English and Navarrese allies. Without them, Pedro was once more deposed, and lost his life. Again the English gained nothing from their intervention, except the enmity of the new king of Castile, who allied himself with France. The English merchant community that had been established in Seville was massacred on Henry's order. Between 1372 and 1380, Castilian corsairs raided the southern coasts of England with relative impunity, turning the tide in the Hundred Years' War decisively in France's favour.

The Black Prince's intervention in the Castilian Civil War, and the failure of Pedro to reward his services, depleted the prince's treasury. He resolved to recover his losses by raising the taxes in Aquitaine. The Gascons, unaccustomed to such taxes, complained. Unheeded, they turned to the King of France as their feudal overlord. But by the Treaty of Brétigny the King of France had lost his suzerainty over Aquitaine. After reflecting on the matter, it was asserted that Edward III's renunciation of France had been imperfect. In consequence, the King of France retained his suzerainty over Aquitaine. Charles V summoned the Black Prince to answer the complaints of his vassals, but Edward refused. The Caroline phase of the Hundred Years' War began.

== French recovery ==
French recovery of lost territories

When Charles V resumed the war, the balance had shifted in his favour; France remained the largest and most powerful state in Western Europe, and England had lost its most capable military leaders. Edward III was too old and the Black Prince an invalid, while in December 1370, John Chandos, the vastly experienced seneschal of Poitou, was killed in a skirmish near Lussac-les-Châteaux. On the advice of Bertrand du Guesclin, appointed Constable of France in November 1370, the French adopted an attritional strategy. Rather than seeking battle, the English were worn down by an incremental approach whereby the areas ceded at Bretigny were retaken piece by piece, including Poitiers in 1372.

In August 1372, the English suffered a disastrous naval defeat at La Rochelle, when a supply convoy carrying reinforcements for Aquitaine, along with £20,000 to pay the troops, was intercepted and sunk by a Castilian fleet. This exposed the English coast to French and Spanish raids, isolated Gascony, and increased public opposition to the war. In addition, Jean III de Grailly, Captal de Buch, a Gascon fighting for the English who had filled the gap left by Chandos, was captured in the fighting around La Rochelle. Despite pleas from his own knights, Charles refused to ransom the Captal, arguing he was too dangerous to release, and kept him in prison where he died in 1376.

The English responded with a series of destructive military expeditions into French territory called chevauchées, hoping to bring du Guesclin to battle. The most significant of these was led by John of Gaunt in 1373; launched between two bouts of the Black Death in 1369 and 1375, the plague had a devastating economic impact, making it difficult for him to fund the campaign. According to chronicler Jean Froissart, the Chevauchée had been planned for three years. The English were known for their capability in this type of warfare. The English plan involved marching from Calais through Champagne and Burgundy into Aquitaine, a journey of over 1,000 miles lasting five months.

By burning manors, mills and villages, they hoped to destroy the French tax base and demonstrate Charles's inability to protect his subjects, moving at speed to allow them strike and withdraw before the enemy could respond. On this occasion, Charles issued strict instructions to avoid major combat and ordered farmers to take refuge in fortified towns. As they entered Burgundy, the English columns were tracked by one of du Guesclin's most effective subordinates, Olivier de Clisson, who killed over 600 and took many others prisoner. Most of their baggage and transport was lost crossing the Loire and Allier in October, leaving them short of supplies.

By the time they reached Bordeaux on Christmas Eve 1373, the English had been decimated by disease and starvation, with many of the knights on foot. Defeat caused great anger and resentment in England against John of Gaunt, who remained a powerful political player, but his unpopularity meant his efforts to agree peace with France were unsuccessful. By 1374, the Treaty of Bretigny had been nullified in fact as well as name; apart from Calais, England held no more territory than before their victory at Crécy in 1346.

== Treaty of Bruges ==
France following the truce of 1389

Instigated by Pope Gregory XI, the 1375 Treaty of Bruges agreed a 12-month truce between the two sides while they negotiated an end to the fighting. France was represented by Philip II, Duke of Burgundy, and England by John of Gaunt. Talks eventually broke down over the issue of Aquitaine; the English wanted full sovereignty, while the French insisted it be retained by the House of Valois. Despite attempts by the Pope to broker a compromise, agreement could not be reached and the war resumed in 1377.

The Black Prince died in 1376; in April 1377, Edward III sent his Lord Chancellor, Adam Houghton, to negotiate with Charles, who returned home when Edward himself died in June. He was succeeded on the throne of England by his ten-year-old grandson, Richard II. It was not until Richard had been deposed by his cousin Henry Bolingbroke that the English, under the House of Lancaster, could forcefully revive their claim to the French throne. The war nonetheless continued until the first of a series of truces was signed in 1389.

Charles V died in September 1380 and was succeeded by his underage son, Charles VI, who was placed under the joint regency of his three uncles. With his successes, Charles may have believed that the end of the war was at hand. On his deathbed, Charles V repealed the royal taxation necessary to fund the war effort. As the regents attempted to reimpose the taxation, a popular revolt known as the Harelle broke out in Rouen. As tax collectors arrived at other French cities, the revolt spread and violence broke out in Paris and most of France's other northern cities. The regency was forced to repeal the taxes to calm the situation.

== Military significance ==
French success in the war was largely driven by a professional standing army that Charles V had been able to create and finance in the aftermath of the disastrous experience with the mercenary routiers who had pillaged much of the country after the 1360 peace. This force, the first standing army in post-Roman western Europe, was eventually disbanded in the tumultuous regency period after 1380. Charles VII reestablished a permanent standing army in 1445 with the Compagnies d'ordonnance which would survive until eventually replaced by the gendarmerie system in the 17th century. The professional units gave the French a considerable strategic advantage as well as an edge in professionalism and discipline, being composed of paid full-time soldiers, at a time when levies could only be fielded for limited periods of time and the allegiances of the aristocratic knights could often shift to the opposing side. The standing armies of both Charles V and Charles VII had approximately 6,000 men, divided to many companies of cavalrymen.

== The Great Schism ==
In 1378 Charles V's support for the election of the Avignon Pope Clement VII started the Great Schism. This event split the Church for almost four decades and thwarted papal efforts to prevent or end the Hundred Years' War. The disputed papal succession resulted in several lines of popes competing for the support of national rulers, which exacerbated the political divisions of the war. Despite papal involvement in peace conferences throughout the 14th century, no settlement was ever reached, in part because the papacy was not influential enough to impose one.

== Sources ==
- Cannon, J. A. (2002). "Bruges, treaty of". The Oxford Companion to British History. Oxford: Oxford University Press. ISBN 97-8019-86051-40.
- Nicolle, David (2011). The Great Chevauchée: John of Gaunt's Raid on France 1373. Oxford: Osprey Publishing. ISBN 978-1849082471.
- Rogers, Clifford (2006). "Chevauchée". International Encyclopedia of Military History. London: Routledge. ISBN 978-0415936613.
- Wagner, John A (2006). Encyclopedia of the Hundred Years War. Westport CT: Greenwood Press. ISBN 0-313-32736-X.
- Williams, Glanmor (2004). "Houghton, Adam (d. 1389)". Oxford Dictionary of National Biography (online ed.). Oxford University Press. doi:10.1093/ref:odnb/13863. (Subscription, Wikipedia Library access or UK public library membership required.)
- Ormrod, W., (2002). "Edward III". History Today. Vol. 52(6), 20 pgs.
- Ayton, A., (1992). "War and the English Gentry under Edward III". History Today. Vol. 42(3), 17 pgs.
- Harari, Y., (2000). "Strategy and Supply in Fourteenth Century Western European Invasion" *Campaigns. Journal of Military History. Vol. 64(2), 37 pgs.
- Saul, N., (1999). "Richard II". History Today. Vol. 49(9), 5 pgs.
- Tuchman, Barbara W (1978). A Distant Mirror; the calamitous 14th century (2017 ed.). Penguin. ISBN 978-0241972977.
- Jones, W.R., (1979). "The English Church and Royal Propaganda during the Hundred Years' War". The Journal of British Studies, Vol. 19(1), 12 pages.
- Perroy, E., (1951). The Hundred Years' War. New York, New York: Oxford University Press.
- Preston, Richard; Wise, Sydney F.; Werner, Herman O. (1991). Men in arms: a history of warfare and its interrelationships with Western society. 5th Edition. Beverley MA: Wadsworth Publishing Co Inc. ISBN 0-03-033428-4.
