= Westrozebeke =

Coordinates: 50°55′58″N 3°00′50″E

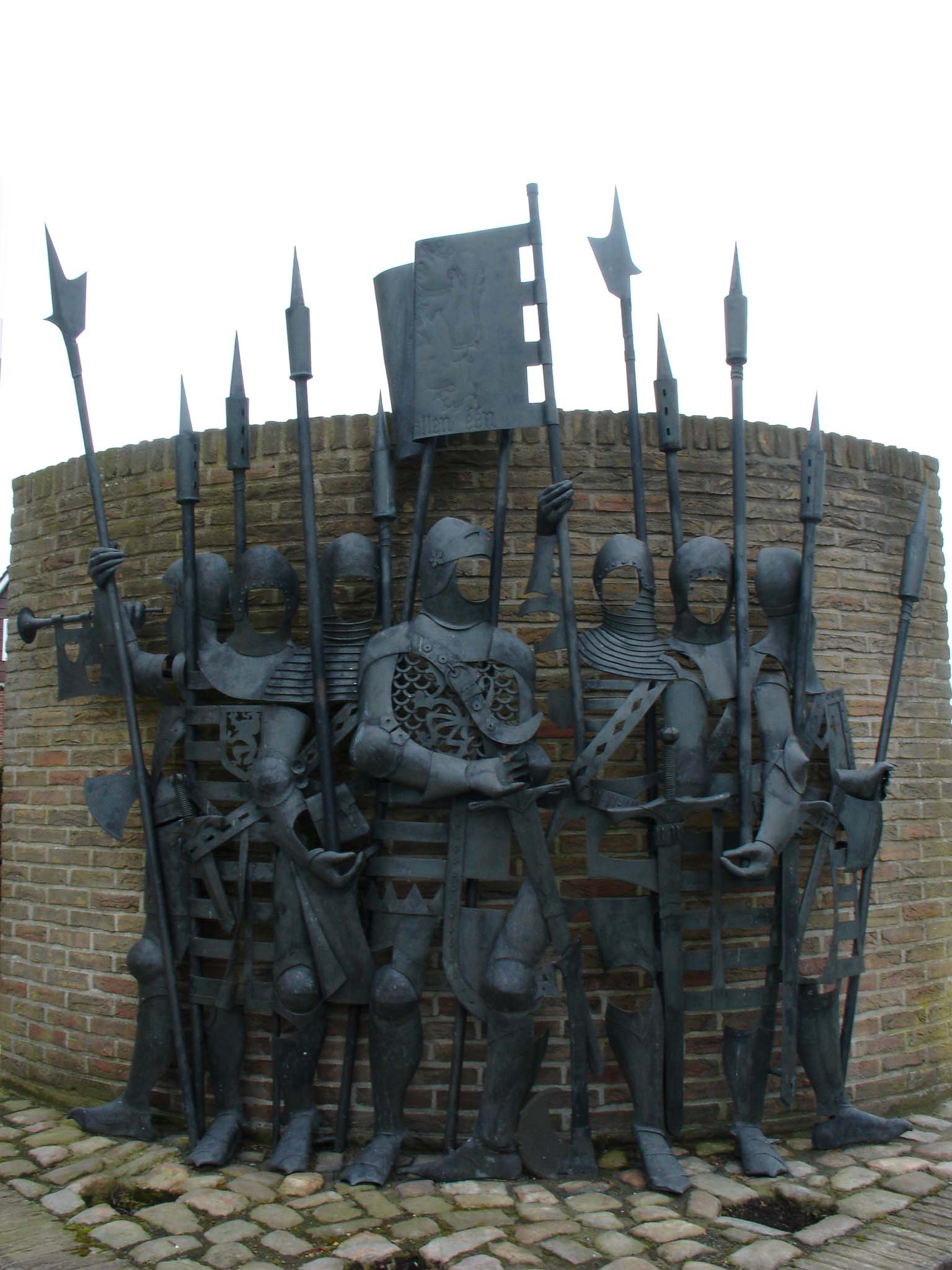
Monument on the town square as a remembrance of the battle that was held here

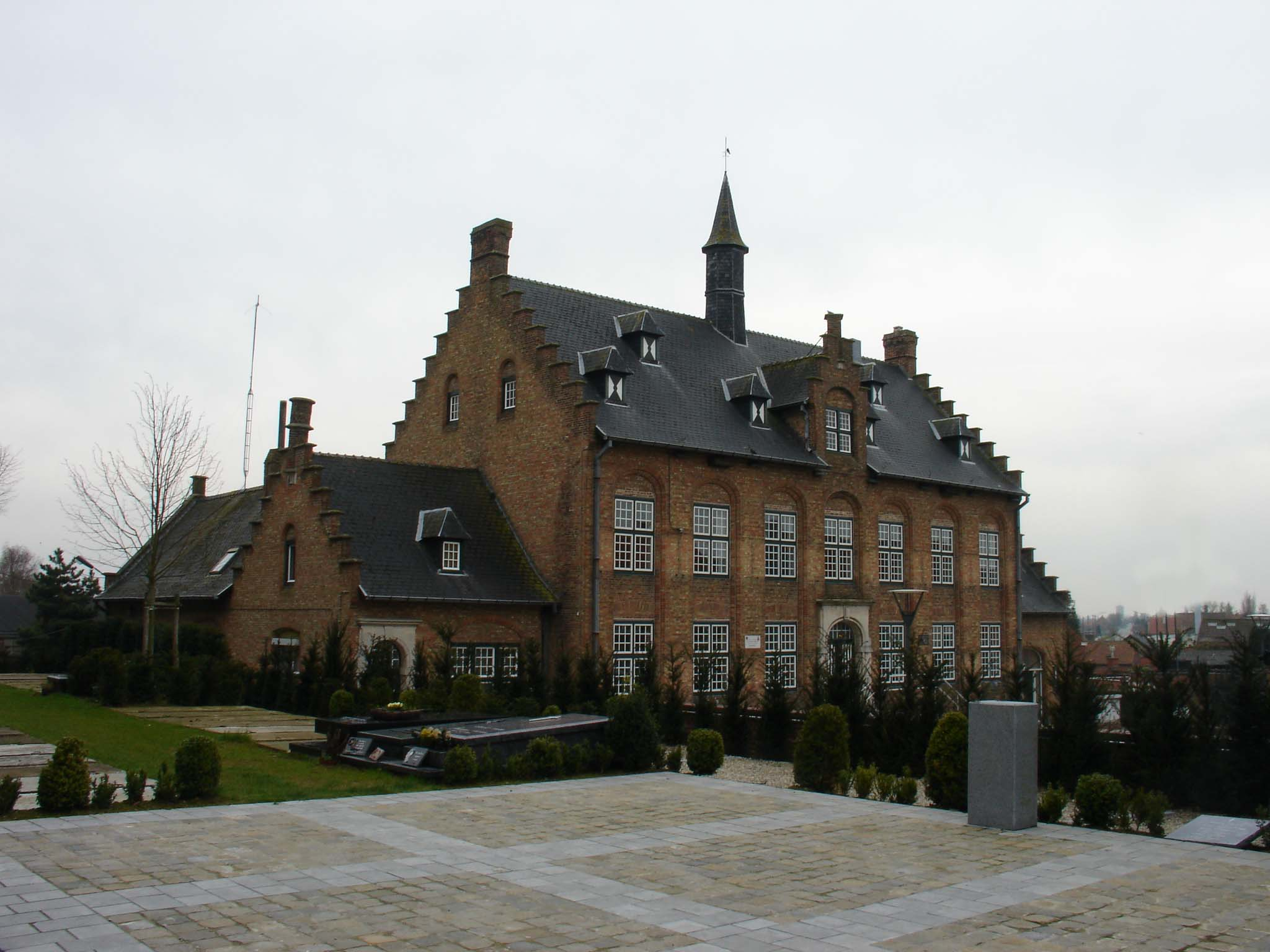
The old Town Hall of the village

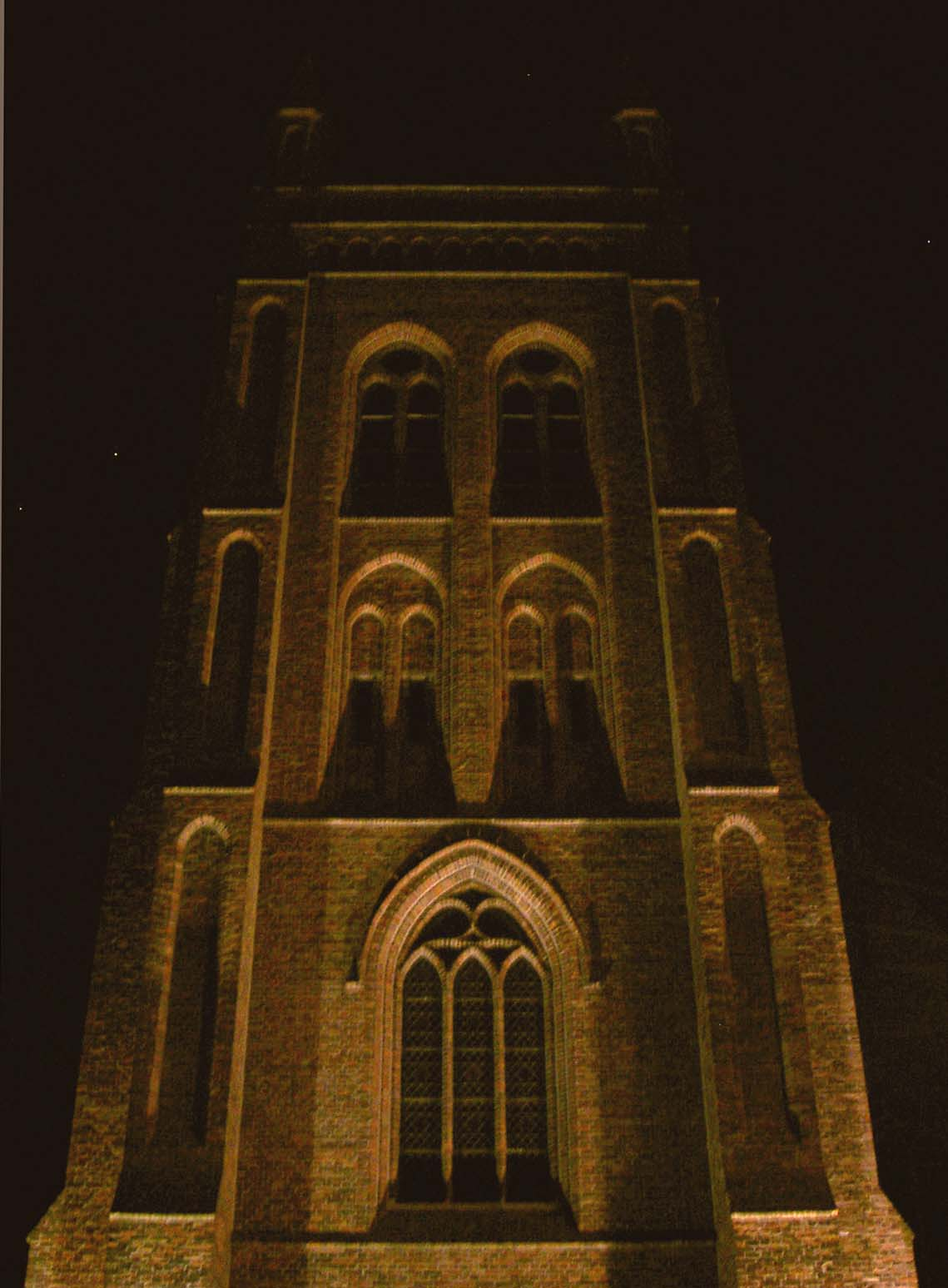
The church of Saint-Bavo at Westrozebeke

Westrozebeke is a village in the Belgian province of West Flanders. It is part of the municipality of Staden. It is located 6 miles (10 km) west of Roeselare and 9.5 miles (15 km) north-east of Ypres. It's a typical agricultural village with many farms.

The name Westrozebeke means 'west thatch brook'. The word 'roze' is also related to the 'roes' of the nearby city Roeselare.

It lies at the top of a hill, and has beautiful views, especially to the West. It has two football fields and a local youth mouvement, the Chiro.

The village is also famous because of the Battle of Roosebeke, where a Flemish army under the guidance of Philip van Artevelde (son of the famous Jacob van Artevelde, Flemish statesman and political leader of the city of Ghent) fought a French army under guidance of Lodewijk II van Male and Charles VI of France. The Flemish army was defeated and Artevelde died in battle.

Famous World War I spy Marthe Cnockaert was born and raised in the village. She died here as well.
