= Siege of Ypres =

Siege of Ypres may refer to:

- Siege of Ypres (1383), during Despenser's Crusade
- Siege of Ypres (1583–1584), during the Eighty Years' War
- Siege of Ypres (1648), during the Franco-Spanish War (1635–1659)
- Siege of Ypres (1658), after the Battle of the Dunes (1658)
- Siege of Ypres (1678), during the Franco-Dutch War
- Siege of Ypres (1709), before the Battle of Malplaquet
- Siege of Ypres (1744), during the War of the Austrian Succession
- Siege of Ypres (1794), during the Flanders Campaign

== See also ==
- Battle of Ypres, a list of battles from 1914–1918
