= Oriflamme =

Medieval battle standard of the King of France

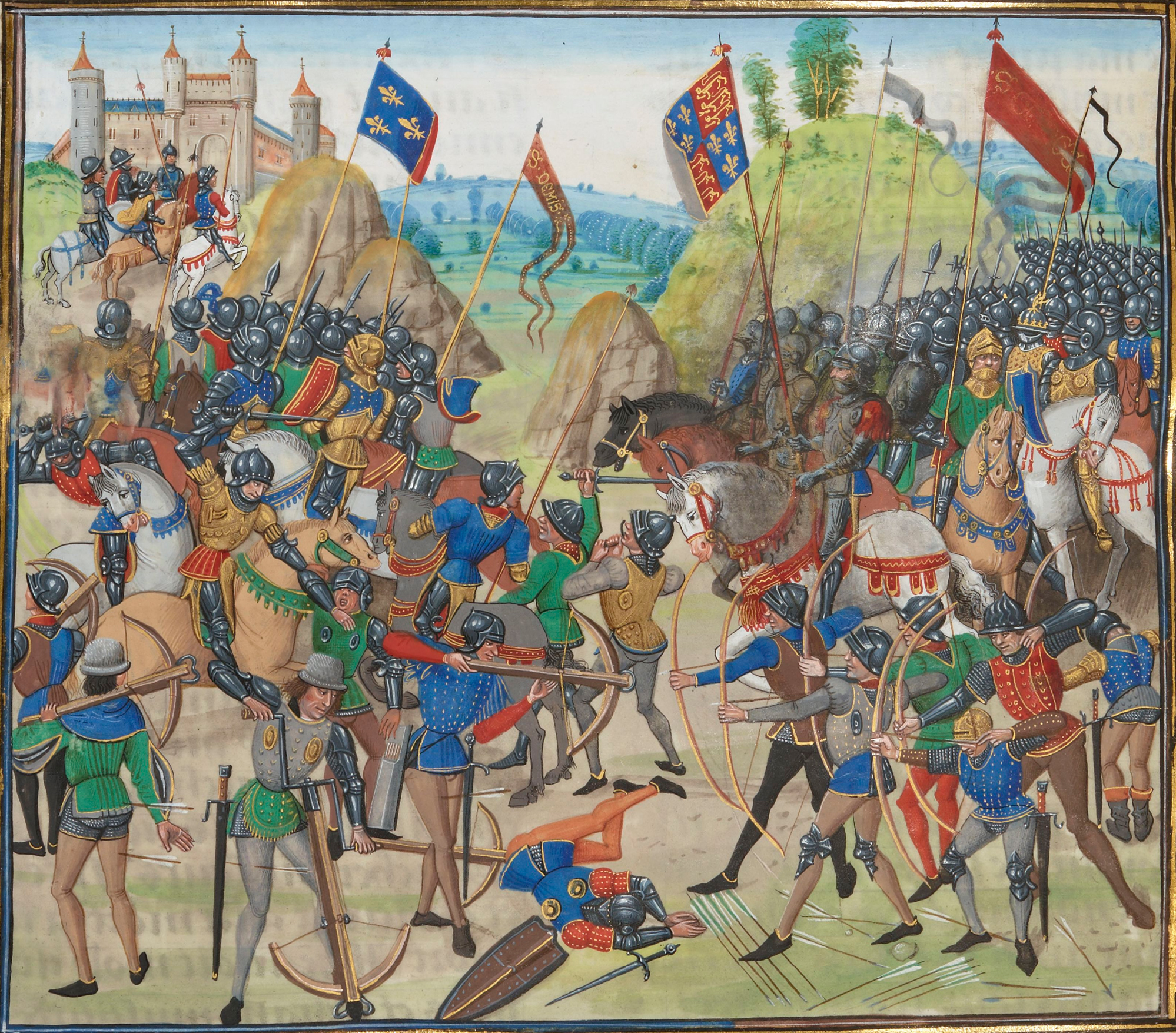
The Battle of Crecy 1346. A version of the oriflamme can be seen in the center between two other banners.

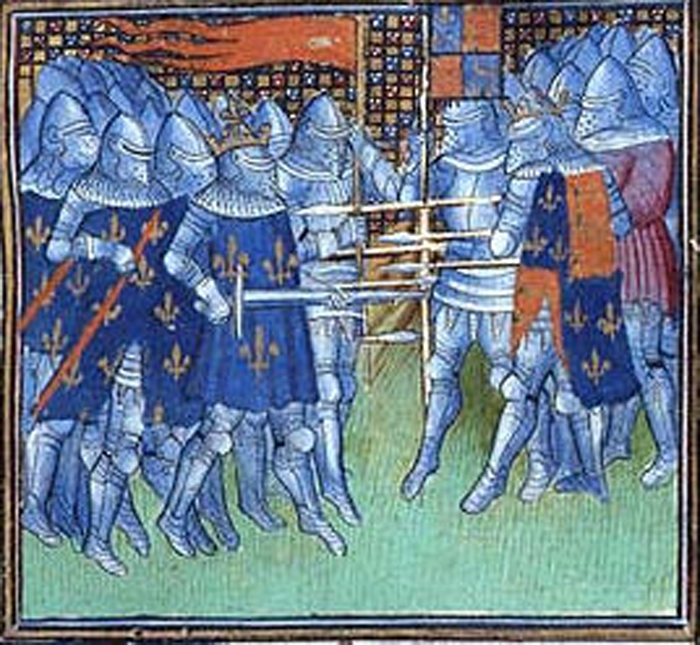
The Battle of Poitiers 1356. The oriflamme can be seen on the top left.

The Oriflamme (from Latin aurea flamma, "golden flame"), a pointed, blood-red banner flown from a gilded lance, was the sacred battle standard of the King of France and a symbol of divine intervention on the battlefield from God and Saint Denis in the Middle Ages. The oriflamme originated as the sacred banner of the Abbey of Saint-Denis, a monastery near Paris. When the oriflamme was raised in battle by the French royalty during the Middle Ages, most notably during the Hundred Years' War, no prisoners were to be taken until it was lowered. Through that tactic, they hoped to strike fear into the hearts of the enemy, especially the nobles, who otherwise could usually expect to be taken alive for ransom during such military encounters.

In French, the term oriflamme has come to mean any banner with pointed ends by association with the form of the original.

== Legendary origin ==
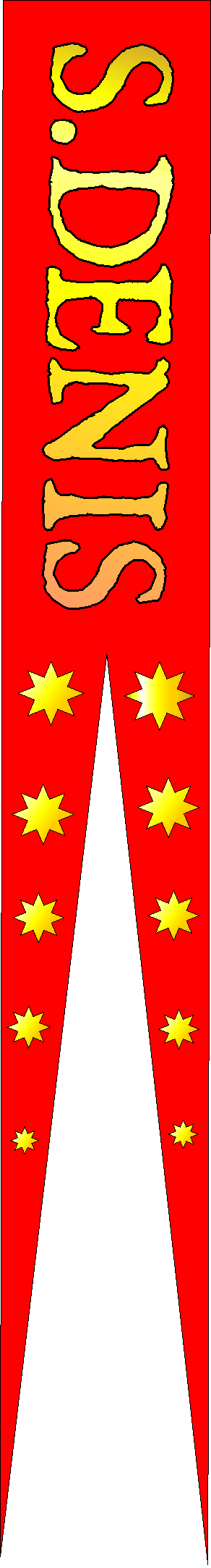
Reconstructions of two versions of the historical Oriflamme banner. Other descriptions have the banner as plain red.

The Oriflamme was mentioned in the 11th-century ballad the Chanson de Roland (vv. 3093–5) as a royal banner, first called Romaine and then Montjoie. According to legend, Charlemagne carried it to the Holy Land in response to a prophecy regarding a knight possessing a golden lance from which flames would burn and drive out the Saracens. That suggests that the lance was originally the important object, with the banner simply a decoration, but that changed over time.

== History ==
The Oriflamme was first used in 1124 by King Louis VI of France, but a version of it remained in the Abbey of Saint-Denis until the 18th century.

Louis VI replaced the earlier banner of Saint Martin with the oriflamme of the Abbey of St. Denis, which floated about the tomb of Saint Denis and was said to have been given to the abbey by Dagobert I, King of the Franks.

Until the 12th century, the standard-bearer was the Count of Vexin, who, as vowed to Saint Denis, was the temporal defender of the abbey. Louis VI, having acquired Vexin, became standard-bearer. As soon as war began, he received Communion at Saint-Denis and took the standard from the tomb of the saint to carry it into combat.

Although the azure ground (from the blue cope of St. Martin of Tours) strewn with gold fleur-de-lis remained the symbol of royalty until the 15th century, the Oriflamme became the royal battle standard of the King of France, and it was carried at the head of the king's forces when they met another army in battle. It is recorded as having been carried at the following battles/campaigns:

- Bouvines (1214).
- Seventh Crusade (1248).
- Mons-en-Pévèle (1304).
- Crécy (1346).
- Poitiers (1356).
- Roosebeke (1382).
- Agincourt (1415) (disputed; see below).

The Oriflamme was lost at least four times during its medieval history: Mons-en-Pévèle, Crécy, Poitiers, and during the campaigns of the Seventh Crusade under King Louis IX.

Although the Oriflamme has often been depicted as present at the battle of Agincourt, modern historians have disputed that. The banner was given to Guillaume de Martel by King Charles VI of France on September 10, 1415 and carried by Martel from Paris to Rouen. That was likely an attempt to raise French morale and to rally troops, but there is no evidence that the Oriflamme was then taken on campaign and unfurled at Agincourt. Modern historians agree that the Oriflamme was not carried by Guillaume de Martel at Agincourt, as the king was not present at the battle in person.

In the 15th century, the fleur-de-lis on the white flag of Joan of Arc became the new royal standard replacing both the symbol of royalty and the Oriflamme on the battle field.

== Appearance ==
The banner was red or orange-red silk and flown from a gilded lance. According to legend, its colour stemmed from it being dipped in the blood of the recently beheaded St. Denis.

The surviving descriptions of the Oriflamme are in Guillaume le Breton (13th century), in the "Chronicle of Flanders" (14th century), in the "Registra Delphinalia" (1456) and in the inventory of the treasury of Saint-Denis (1536). They show that the primitive Oriflamme was succeeded in the course of the centuries by newer Oriflammes, which bore little resemblance to one another except for their colour.

== On the battlefield ==
The Oriflamme, when displayed on the battlefield, indicated that no quarter was to be given: its red colour was symbolic of cruelty and ferocity.

The bearer of the standard, the porte-oriflamme, became an office, like that of the Marshal or Constable.

Froissart vividly describes porte-oriflamme Geoffroi de Charny's fall at the side of his king at the Battle of Poitiers in this passage:

There Sir Geoffroi de Charny fought gallantly near the king (note: and his fourteen-year-old son). The whole press and cry of battle were upon him because he was carrying the king’s sovereign banner [the Oriflamme]. He also had before him his own banner, gules, three escutcheons argent. So many English and Gascons came around him from all sides that they cracked open the king’s battle formation and smashed it; there were so many English and Gascons that at least five of these men at arms attacked one [French] gentleman. Sir Geoffroi de Charny was killed with the banner of France in his hand, as other French banners fell to earth.

=== Notable bearers ===
- Geoffroi de Charny – 14th-century knight and author of several works on chivalry. He first bore the Oriflamme during the failed attempt to relieve Calais in 1350.
- Arnoul d'Audrehem – 14th-century former Marshal of France. He held the office from 1368 to his death in 1370 but never carried the banner in action.
- Sir Pierre de Villiers carried the Oriflamme at the Battle of Roosebeke against the Flemish rebels of Ghent led by Philip van Artevelde in 1382.

== In literature ==
In Canto XXXI of Paradiso, Dante describes the Virgin Mary in the Empyrean as pacifica oriafiamma (Musa's translation, "oriflame of peace"):

so there, on high, that oriflame of peace
lit up its center while on either side
its glow was equally diminishing

The 19th-century poet Robert Southey refers to the Oriflamme and its reputation in his poem Joan of Arc:

"Dark-minded man!"
The Maid of Orleans answered, "to act well
Brings with itself an ample recompense.
I have not reared the oriflamme of death —
Now God forbid! The banner of the Lord
Is this; and, come what will, me it behooves,
Mindful of Him whose minister I am,
To spare the fallen foe: that gracious God
Sends me a messenger of mercy forth,
Sends me to save this ravaged realm of France,
To England friendly as to all the world;
Only to those an enemy, whose lust
Of sway makes them the enemies of man."

— Robert Southey, Joan of Arc. Book VIII

The 20th-century Martiniquais poet and politician, Aimé Césaire (1913–2008) invokes the Oriflamme in his poem "Your Hair" ("Chevelure"). By invoking the Oriflamme, Césaire also invokes the French colonial empire, war, and oppression. The poem is included in The Collected Poetry of Aimé Césaire. An excerpt reads:

Undulating innocent
all the juices rising in the lust of the earth
all the poisons distilled by the nocturnal alembics in the involucres of the Malvaceae
all the thundering of the Saponaria
are like these discordant words written by the flames of pyres
over the sublime oriflammes of your revolt

— Aimé Césaire, Solar Throat Slashed

The Oriflamme is depicted in season 2 episode 6 of the History Channel series Knightfall, being risen by Philip IV at the start of a siege on a Templar castle.

The Oriflamme is also raised in History Channel's Vikings during a 9th Century siege of Paris, predating the first mention of the banner by two centuries.

In the Discworld novel Small Gods by Terry Pratchett, the flag of the theocracy of Omnia is referred to as an Oriflamme.

== See also ==
- Montjoie Saint Denis!
