= Jan Hyoens =

Jan Hyoens was a citizen of Ghent and one of the city's key leaders in its six-year revolt against the Count of Flanders. His name appears in the Chronicles of Froissart–an account of the history and conflicts within the Low Countries.

== Account of his life ==
French poet and court historian Jean Froissart first mentioned Hyoens in his chronicles as a key member of a minor feud against a Ghentian rival family named Mayhuus, led by Gijsbrecht. According to Froissart, both the Hyoens and the Mayhuus clans were descendants of families originating from Damme. Their houses shared a kinship. Hyoens was also the leader of the White Hoods (Witte Kaproenen), a prominent feuding faction in Ghent. He was also the leader of Ghent's shippers guild. Under Hyoen's leadership, the White Hoods perpetrated crimes against the count including killing his bailiff assigned to arrest one of the guild members, and destroying Wondelgem, the count's castle near Ghent.

Froissart mentions Hyoens [for the final time] in 1382. The exact date of his death is uncertain however, Dutch historian Petrus Johannes Blok states in his own book History of the People of the Netherlands, that after Hyoens' death, fellow Ghentian Philip van Artevelde accepted the office of captain of Ghent in February 1381, while Froissart records Van Artevelde officially coming into command of the office the following year in January 1382.

== In fiction ==
A historically fictional account of Hyoens' life and family background appears in the novel "The City- Revenge" written by René Jean-Paul Dewil in 2015.
