= Revolt of Ghent (1379–1385) =

- Part of the Hundred Years' War
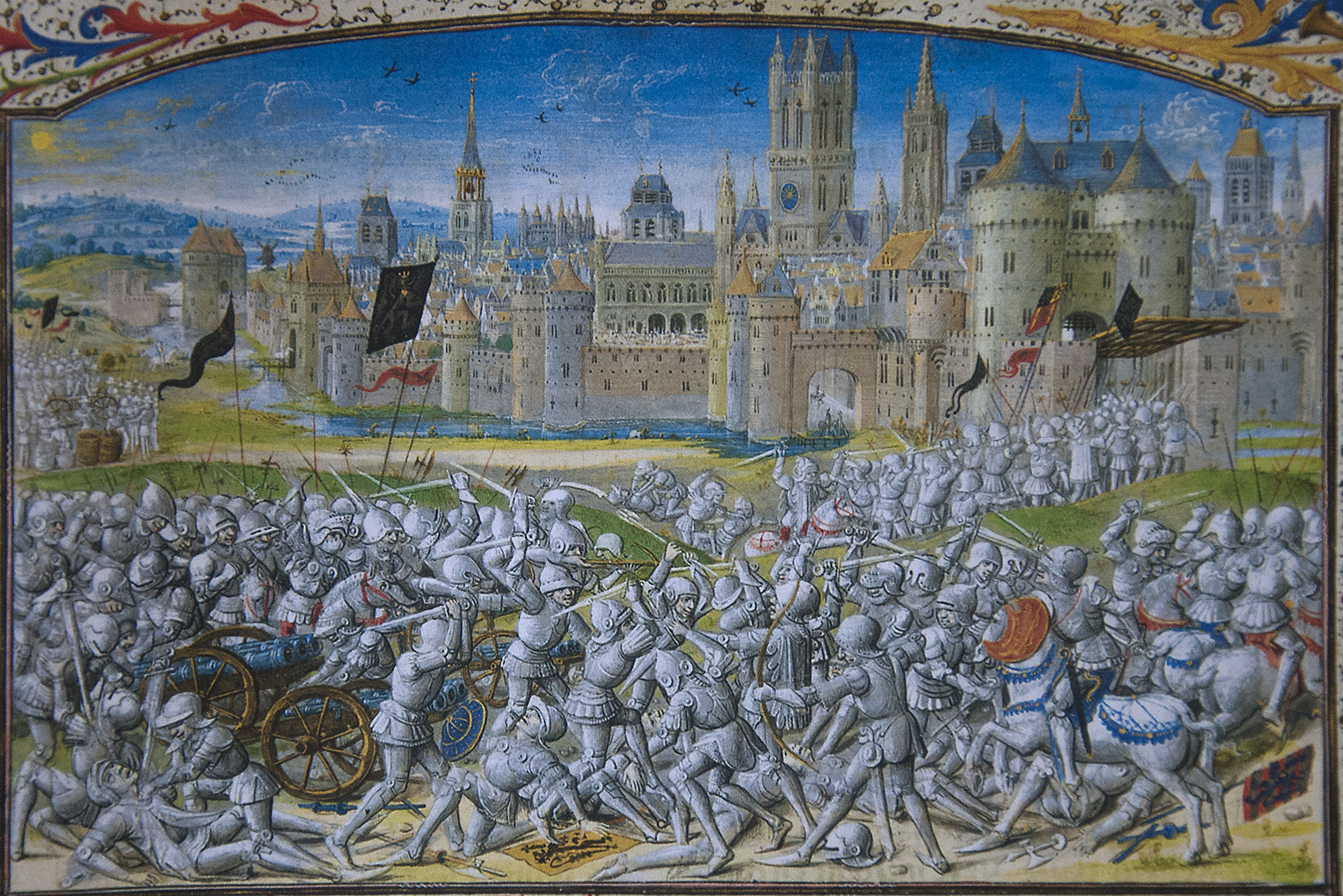
- Battle of Beverhoutsveld in the chronicles of Jean Froissart (Berlin Staatsbibliothek, Preußischer Kulturbesitz / 15th century) with the people of Ghent under the black flag with white lion
Date	1379 – 1385
Location	County of Flanders
Result	Franco–Burgundian victory; Peace of Tournai: Ghent recognizes authority of the French king and Burgundian duke; Ghent gets amnesty

Belligerents
France; Flanders; Burgundy (1384–5)	Rebels of Ghent; England (1383–5)

Commanders and leaders
Charles VI; Louis of Male; Philip the Bold	Jan Hyoens; Philip van Artevelde; Frans Ackerman

The Revolt of Ghent (1379-1385) was an uprising by the city of Ghent against the count of Flanders and the king of France. Under the leadership of successively Jan Hyoens, Philip van Artevelde and Frans Ackerman, Ghent rebelled against Count Louis II of Flanders, Duke Philip the Bold of Burgundy and King Charles VI of France. It was an expression of the growing power of the Third Estate and of economic ties with England that had been strained by the Hundred Years' War. After six years of war, Ghent submitted to the ducal authority while avoiding further punishment. The dream of an autonomous city-state failed, and the era of royal centralization continued.

== Outbreak of the Revolt ==
Count Louis of Flanders (also known as Louis of Male) had allowed the city of Bruges to dig a canal to the Lys in Deinze. Ghent was thus threatened to miss out on a lot of income from its staple port status. In May 1379, when the Bruges canal diggers had entered the Ghent area at Sint-Joris, they were attacked by the White Chaperons led by Hyoens (so-called because they wore white chaperons on their heads). Bailiff Rogier van Outrive arrested a White Chaperon. In reprisal, the citizens of Ghent killed the bailiff and burned down the count's new castle at Wondelgem. Other fortifications in the area were also pillaged. The weavers moved through Flemish towns and managed to provoke a general revolt against Louis of Male, except for Oudenaarde and Dendermonde. After this triumph Hyoens died on 1 October 1379. He was given a lordly funeral.

== Response from Count Louis of Flanders ==
Louis's son-in-law Philip the Bold, Duke of Burgundy, advanced to Flanders and was able to bring about a truce that required concessions from the count. Louis in vain sought support in Paris but he found support among noblemen from other Dutch regions. He unleashed a devastating war in the countryside, cut off river traffic to Ghent, and destroyed the windmills on which the urban food supply depended. Louis skillfully began to divide the coalition of towns opposing him. In May 1380 the Bruges weavers lost their power to smaller guilds, and Ypres surrendered in August. Louis had hundreds of rebels beheaded on the Grote Markt. Other cities now also gave up the fight, after which only Ghent kept the revolt going. On 2 September the Count laid siege to Ghent, but with winter approaching, he had to depart in October. Two further sieges also failed to capture the city, although in June 1381 Geraardsbergen, Ghent's last ally, was taken. The town was burned to the ground and its inhabitants massacred.

== Radicalization of the revolt under Philip van Artevelde and French intervention ==
The blockade of Ghent became more and more acute, despite help from Brussels, Leuven and Liège. Hunger started to lead to despair, and at a peace conference in Harelbeke a compromise was negotiated, to be ratified by a popular assembly. In the months that followed, the agreement became the subject of a bloody battle within the city walls, with the grain traders as the main proponents of peace and the weavers as opponents. On 24 January 1382 the people gathered at the Vrijdagmarkt to decide. The opponents came up with a surprising move: they put forward as the new leader Philip van Artevelde, the son of Jacob van Artevelde who led a revolt against the count of Flanders. Philip was narrowly proclaimed captain of Ghent and carried in triumph to the town hall.

With his right hand Peter van den Bossche he began to eliminate rivals and also had the sons of his father's murderers killed. Artevelde followed a pro-English course, but was unable to obtain military support from the English. Despite drastic measures, he too was forced to the negotiating table because of hunger. In Tournai the count made tough demands: the people of Ghent had to appear before him with a noose around their neck and hear his verdict. Artevelde refused, left the talks, and made a desperate stand a few days later. On 5 May 1382 he appeared at the head of 4000 Ghent rebels in Bruges, where they surprised the count's army during the annual Procession of the Holy Blood and defeated it in the Battle of Beverhoutsveld, partly because part of the Bruges militias defected during the battle. The count was driven into Bruges with his remaining troops and narrowly escaped the slaughter by swimming across the canal at night.

After this defeat, Louis of Male enlisted the help of King Charles VI of France. Despite his disdain for the count who supported the anti-French side in the Western Schism, the young French king agreed to help, on the advice of Duke Philip the Bold. The Ghent revolt could inspire similar revolts in France, England and even Italy, so that Charles VI was prepared to move north to nip in the bud the aspirations of the burghers. From Arras his 10,000-strong army marched through Comines into Flanders. It met the Flemish town militia under Artevelde in the Battle of Roosebeke. Count Louis was given a humiliating position in the rear and had to watch the French unfurl the oriflamme, because they viewed a fight against supporters of Pope Urban VI as a holy battle. The Ghent rebels were caught and crushed in barely two hours. Philip van Artevelde was slain in battle.

== The revolt continues under Frans Ackerman ==
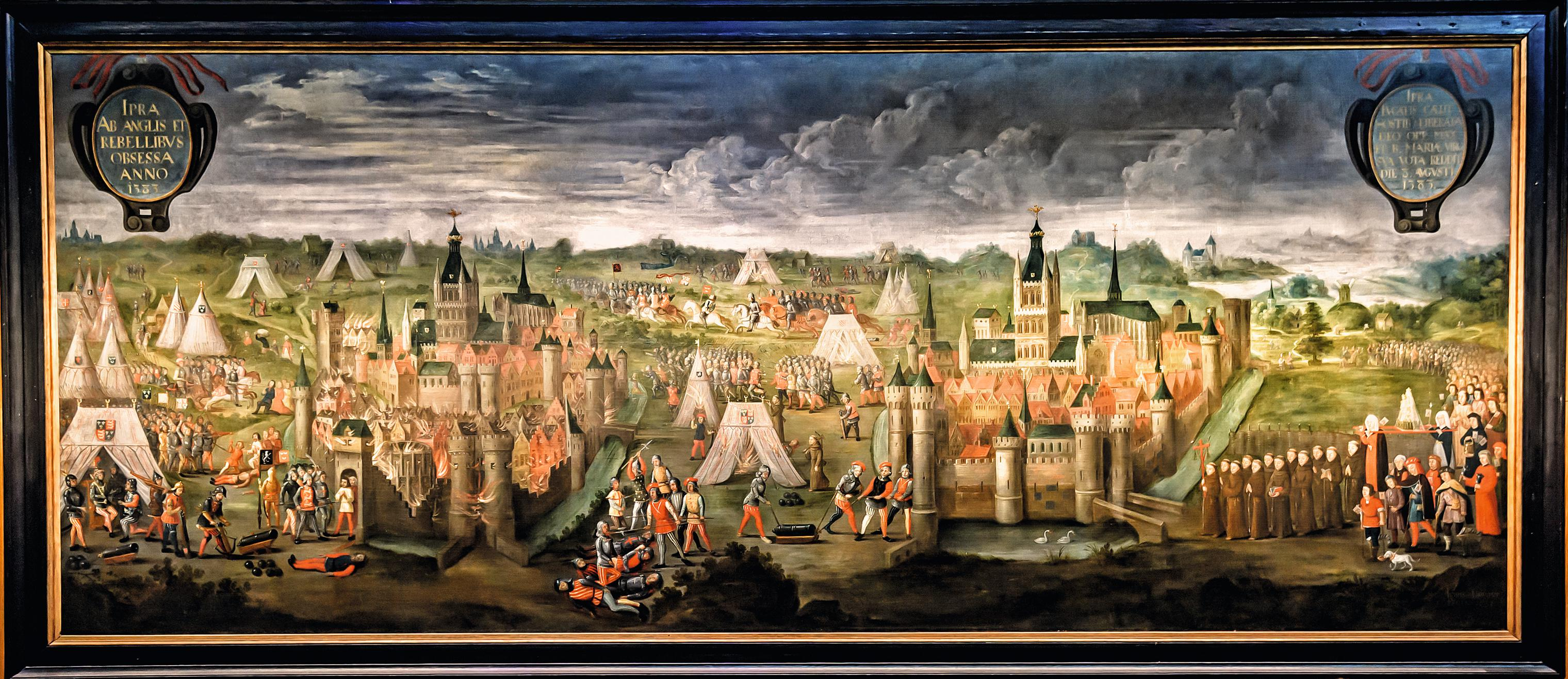
Joris Liebaert, The Siege of Ypres in 1383 (1657)

After their victory at Roosebeke the French failed to subdue Ghent. They first went to loot Courtrai and then had to rush back to France, when Paris and other cities had revolted. Frans Ackerman took over the leadership of the revolt together with Peter van den Bossche. By the end of 1382 the English decided to intervene. Bishop Henry Despenser of Norwich landed in Calais with his troops in the spring of 1383. With help from Ghent, he was victorious in the Battle of Dunkirk and then took Cassel, Nieuwpoort, Diksmuide and other Flemish cities. On the advice of his Ghent allies, Despenser launched a siege of Ypres on 8 June. The people of Ypres gave up their outer city walls, but defended themselves stubbornly in the inner city until a new Franco-Burgundian army came to relieve them at the beginning of August. The retreat of the English meant the worst for the people of Ghent, but they took Oudenaarde to gain control over the Scheldt. Meanwhile, the French and the English were conducting peace negotiations. To the dismay of Count Louis of Male, the people of Ghent were happy with the outcome: on 26 January 1384 a general truce was concluded. The death of the old count a few days later and his succession by Philip the Bold seemed to seal the peace, but the crackdown by his great bailiff Jean de Jumont kept the discontent smoldering.

Another turn in the Hundred Years' War brought new hostilities. 1,300 Ghent rebels led by Frans Ackerman took Damme in July 1385, in order to cut off the French king from his fleet in Sluys with which he intended to invade England. Charles VI and Philip the Bold advanced to retake the city, but Ackerman put up strong resistance with the help of English archers and a battery of cannons. Ackerman and his followers sneaked out of the besieged city on 16 August, perhaps because he had information that his authority in Ghent was being threatened. The troops left behind fought for their lives and also tried to break through the lines on 26 August, but they were discovered, followed and killed. The next day the city was stormed by the French and burned down. About 200 surviving rebels were taken to Bruges and beheaded.

For Philip the Bold, subjugating Ghent now took precedence over the invasion of England. With Charles VI in charge, he advanced to the rebellious city and established his headquarters in the castle of Ertvelde on 1 September. Like Louis of Male before, he noticed that the city was virtually impregnable. What followed was a relentless pillaging of the region of Quatre-Métiers until the besiegers departed with winter in sight. Hardly anyone wanted a continuation of the war the following summer. The Ghent citizens were exhausted, the French wanted to invade England, and the Burgundian duke could not continue to despoil his richest territory.

== Peace negotiations and outcome ==
Burgundian Chancellor Jean Canard advised Philip the Bold to be magnanimous. The duke followed his advice and in December surprised the Ghent envoy, Jan van Heyle, with the gentle peace terms he was prepared to grant. For a moment, intransigence on the part of the Ghent delegation still threatened to derail the talks, but in the end, the Peace of Tournai was signed on 18 December 1385. The citizens of Ghent committed themselves to obey the duke and to end the war and their alliance with the English. In return, the duke renounced any form of punishment and granted an amnesty that also extended to the Ghent-allied towns. The exiles were allowed to return, and the prisoners were released. All Ghent privileges were maintained and the city was even allowed to choose which pope they recognized (they remained faithful to the pope in Rome).

Philip's magnanimity did not undermine his authority. Until his death in 1404, there were no more revolts in Flanders. That was important for economic recovery because the six years of unrest had very negative consequences for trade and economic activity in Flanders.

The next great revolt of the guilds and the city was in 1449-1453 against Duke Philip the Good, who sought direct taxation and influence.

== "Gentse heren" ==
According to a legend, the delegation of Ghent, which proudly assumed the title of "gentlemen" (Heren), were not given seat cushions during the negotiations and had folded their preciously-decorated cloaks together as a cushion and then ostentatiously left in protest. The delegation's refusal to dismount from their horses to greet the duke and his retinue would have given the inhabitants of Ghent the mocking name and the irritating reputation of Seigneurs de Gand ("Lords of Ghent"), as they became known among the Burgundians. These stories are probably apocryphal.

== Bibliography ==
- Raymond Demuynck, De Gentse Oorlog (1379-1385), oorzaken en karakter, in Handelingen der Maatschappij voor Geschiedenis en Oudheidkunde te Gent, vol. V, 1951, p. 305-318
- Paul Rogghé, De politiek van Graaf Lodewijk van Male. Het Gents verzet en de Brugse Zuidleie, 1964
- Maurice Vandermaesen, Marc Ryckaert en Maurits Coornaert, De witte kaproenen. De Gentse opstand (1379-1385) en de geschiedenis van de Brugse Leie, 1979
- Andrée Holsters, Moord en politiek tijdens de Gentse opstand 1379-1385, in Handelingen der Maatschappij voor Geschiedenis en Oudheidkunde te Gent, 1983, p. 89-111
