= Romance Flanders =

Region now on the Franco-Belgian border

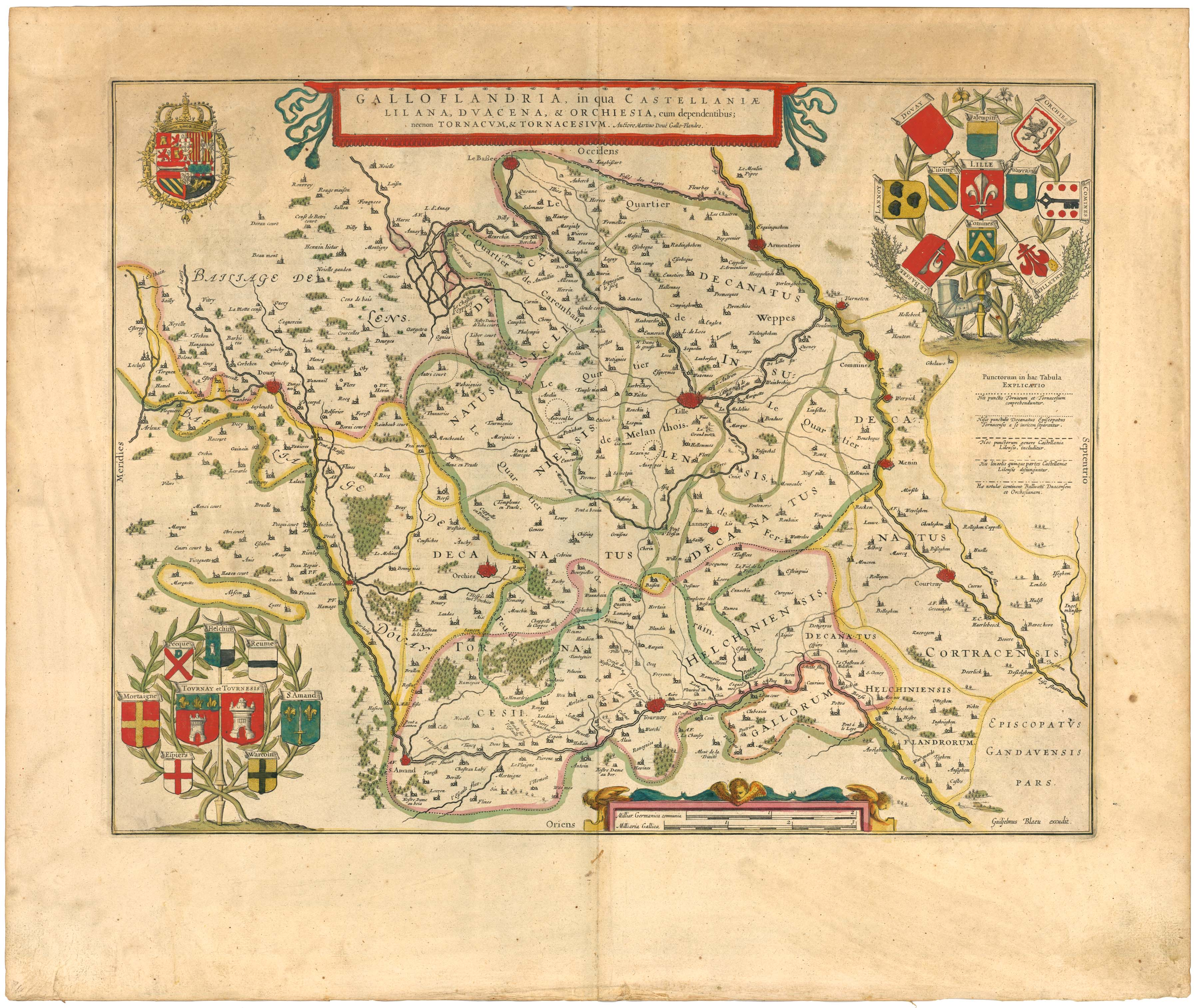
A map of Romance Flanders (1645)

Romance Flanders or Gallicant Flanders is a historical term for the part of the County of Flanders in which Romance languages were spoken, such as varieties of Picard. Today the region straddles the border of France and Belgium.

== Name ==
In Early Modern English, Romance Flanders was also known as Welch Flanders or Gallike Flanders. The original French name is Flandre Gallicane or Flandre Gallicante, derived from the Latin term Gallo Flandria or Flandria Gallica.

The term Walloon Flanders has also been used to designate the region although strictly this would be a political rather than a linguistic designation as the local Romance dialect is Picard and not Walloon. Part of Romance Flanders lies within the Belgian political region of Wallonia.

== Territory ==
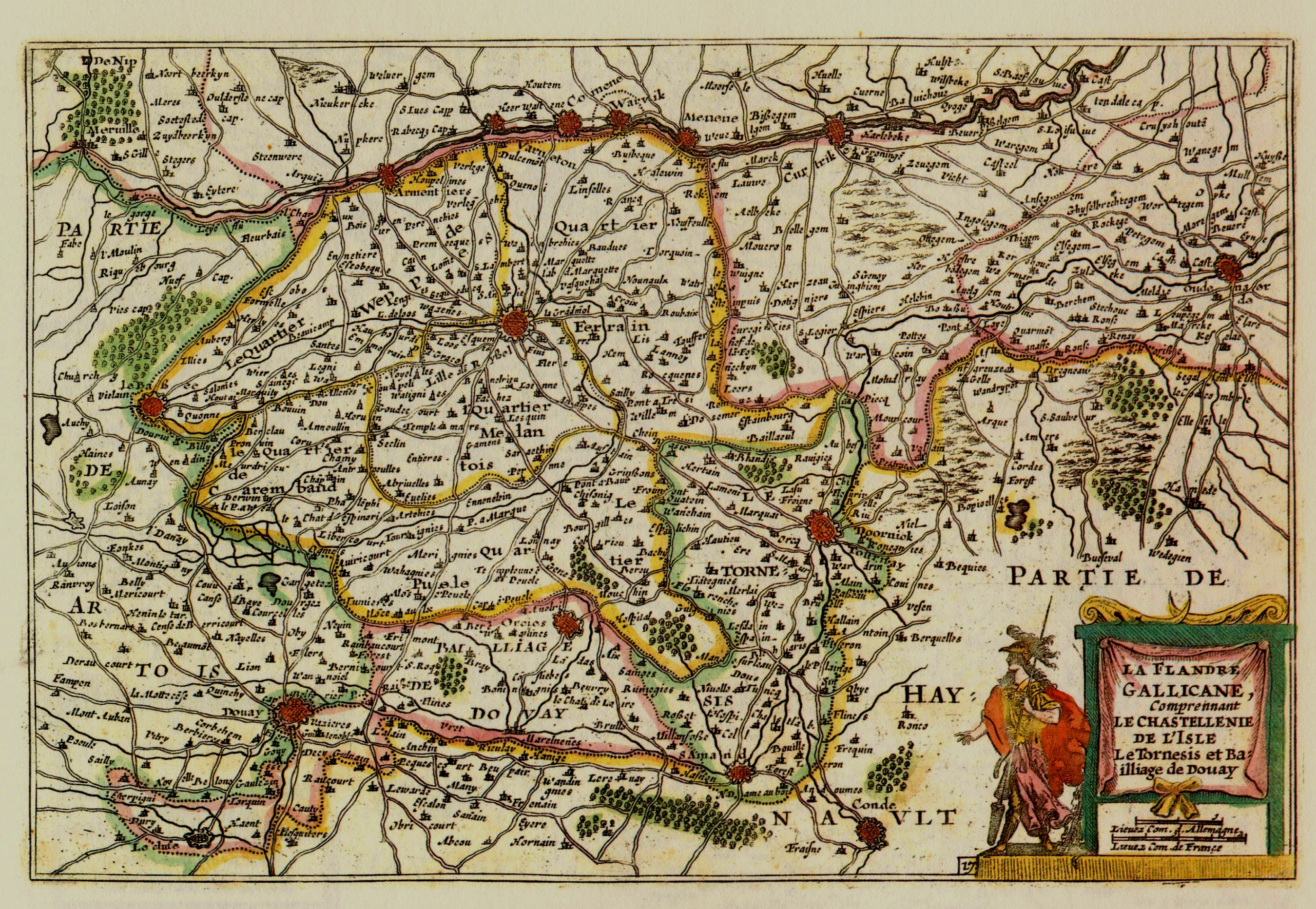
Map of Romance Flanders in the "De Vyerighe Colom" Atlas (1696)

In France:

- The Lilloise Flanders (in French Flandre Lilloise, in Dutch Rijsels-Vlaanderen). Historically this area made up the semi-autonomous region of the County of Flanders known as Lilloise Flanders. Other name includes Gallicant Flanders.
- The northern part of the Scarpe plain with the Pévèle and the bailiwick of Douai (Douaisis).

In Belgium:

- The historical Tournaisis (in Dutch: Doornikse);
- The regions of Mouscron and Comines, part of the old castellany of Kortrijk.
