= Battle of Roosebeke =

1382 battle in Europe

Coordinates: 50°55′48″N 3°0′49″E

- Part of the Ghent Rebellion (1379-1385) and the Hundred Years' War
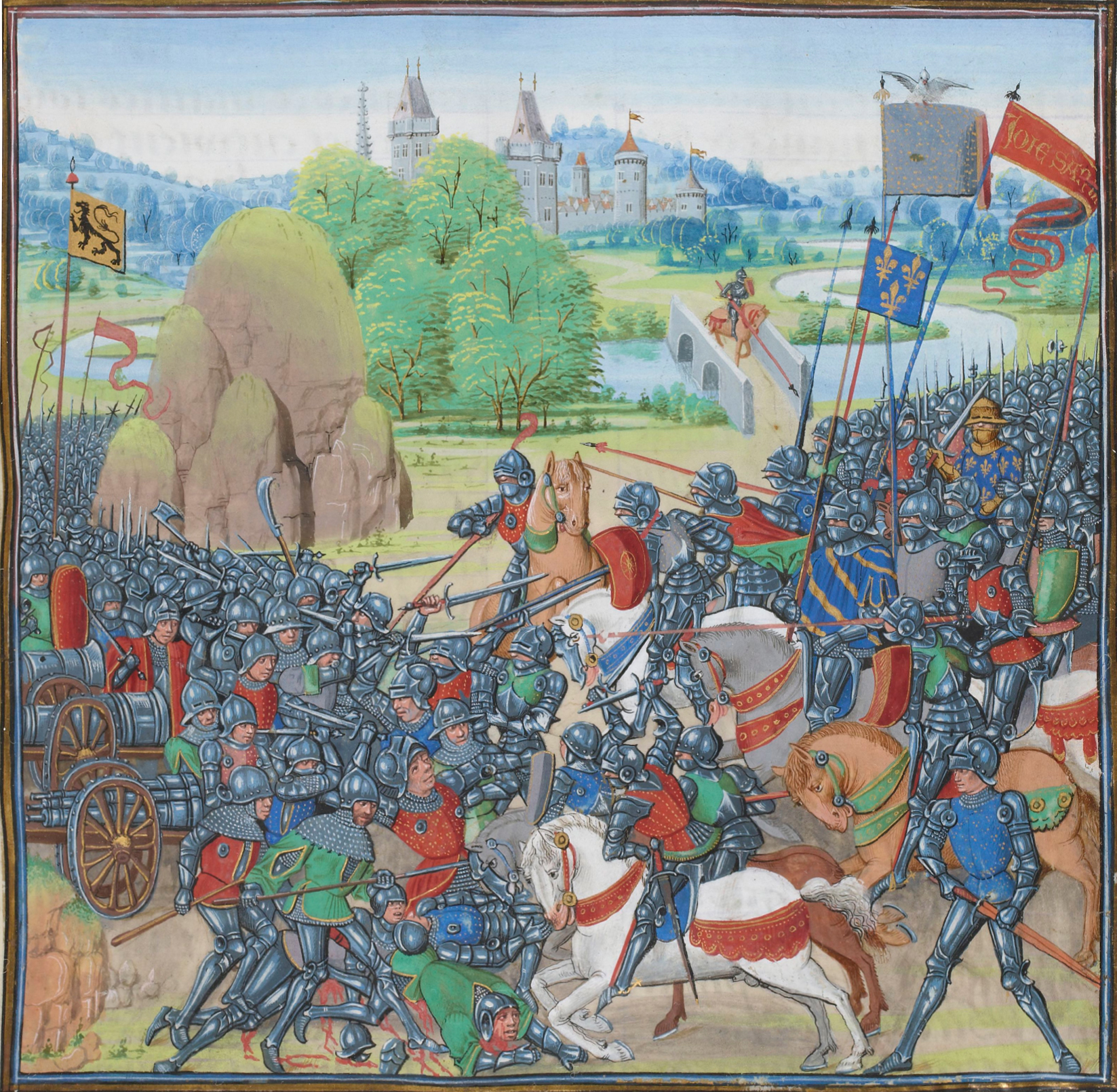
- Battle of Roosebeke (Jean Froissart, 1405)
Date	27 November 1382
Location	Roosebeke, Flanders (today Westrozebeke)
Result	French victory

Belligerents
Kingdom of France; Duchy of Burgundy; County of Flanders; County of Savoy	Flemish towns led by Ghent

Commanders and leaders
Charles VI of France; Philip the Bold, Duke of Burgundy; Olivier de Clisson; Louis de Sancerre; Mouton de Blainville; Amadeus VII, Count of Savoy	Philip van Artevelde †

Strength
10,000: 6,500 men-at-arms; 2,000 pikemen; 1,200 crossbowmen and archers	30,000–40,000

Casualties and losses
100 killed	27,500 killed

The Battle of Roosebeke (sometimes referred by its contemporary name as Battle of Westrozebeke) took place on 27 November 1382 on the Goudberg between a Flemish army under Philip van Artevelde and a French army under Louis II of Flanders who had called upon the help of the French king Charles VI after he had suffered a defeat during the Battle of Beverhoutsveld. The Flemish army was defeated, Philip van Artevelde was slain and his corpse was put on display.

== Prelude ==
Philip the Bold had ruled the council of regents from 1380 till 1388, and ruled France during the childhood years of Charles VI, who was Philip's nephew. He deployed the French army in Westrozebeke to suppress a Flemish rebellion led by Philip van Artevelde, who intended to dispose of Louis II of Flanders. Philip II was married to Margaret of Flanders, Louis' only surviving child and heiress.

=== Ghent ===
Ghent had rebelled against Count Louis II of Flanders. The Count surrounded the city, and when the citizens of Ghent asked for terms, Louis demanded that all men between the ages of 15 and 60 must present themselves with halters around their necks. The count would then decide whom he would pardon and whom he would execute. The men of Ghent determined to fight and on 3 May 1382, under the leadership of Philip Van Artevelde, they issued from their city and smashed Louis' overconfident army at the Battle of Beverhoutsveld.

=== Opposing forces ===
The French nobility, facing an incipient peasant revolt at home, felt forced to move against the upstart Flemish commoners. The French royal party patched up its differences with the unruly citizens of Paris and mounted an expedition on behalf of the Count of Flanders. The French assembled a force of 10,000 men south of Arras in early November. The force comprised 6,500 men-at-arms, 2,000 pikemen and 1,500 crossbowmen and archers. Philip the Bold financed and provided one fifth of the force. The army included King Charles VI and the dukes of Burgundy, Bourbon and Berry, lords Clisson, Sancerre, Coucy, and other notables. The Oriflamme was carried for the first time since the Battle of Poitiers in 1356. A second army, smaller than the first, was assembled to the north at Lille under Count Louis II.

Philip van Artevelde had 30,000–40,000 men, mostly urban levies. His army was besieging Daniel Halewyn's garrison at Oudenaarde. Artevelde left a skeleton force to continue the siege and deployed the main part of his force west of Lille.

=== Action at Comines ===
On 12 November, the French army began making its way to the north. At the river Lys near the town of Comines, the French army was held up by 900 Flemish soldiers commanded by Peter van den Bossche and Peter de Winter. Artevelde told the population of Ypres that the French would never cross the Lys. Since the only bridge was broken, Olivier de Clisson ferried a party of 400 French knights across the river. These volunteers spent an anxious night, then joined battle in the morning. Soon the bridge was rebuilt, the bulk of the French army crossed and the superior force quickly put the Flemish spearmen to flight. Van den Bossche was wounded in the struggle but managed to escape. After this skirmish, a number of Flemish towns sued for peace, paying a stiff ransom to the French king.

== Battle ==
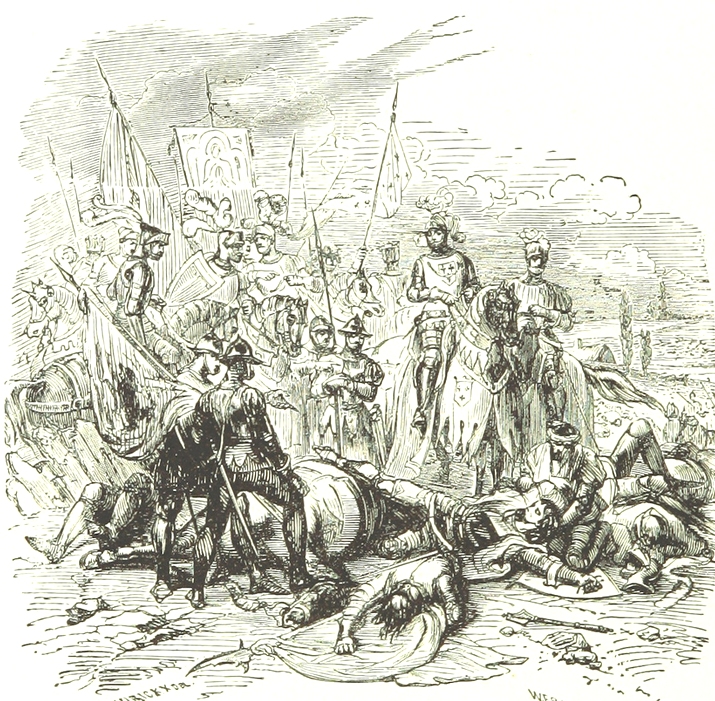
Dead body of Philip van Artevelde at the Battle of Roosebeke. Illustration from 1885.

Artevelde decided to make camp on a hill, the Goudberg, situated between Oostnieuwkerke and Passendale. The French troops lay on the other side of the hill. On the morning of 27 November, Artevelde planned to make use of the dense fog and attack the French. To prevent a breakthrough by enemy cavalry he ordered his men to advance in a tight square formation. The French had not forgotten the Battle of the Golden Spurs, and first engaged the Flemings with a wave of infantry. Artevelde managed to repel that attack and decided to attack the French. The French commander, Olivier de Clisson, reacted by attacking his opponent's unsecured flanks with heavy cavalry. This caused a panic in the Flemish rear which started to flee. The main body of Flemish troops had no other option than to form a circle. They were pushed back and eventually defeated and Philip van Artevelde was killed.

== Aftermath ==
Philip II could not gain any advantage from this victory. He would become Count of Flanders in late January 1384 and needed the economic power of rebellious Ghent. The rebellion lasted till 8 December 1385, when the Peace of Tournai was signed.
