= Battle of Beverhoutsveld =

1382 battle in Europe

Coordinates: 51°09′22.52″N 3°22′51.91″E

- Part of the Revolt of Ghent (1379–1385)
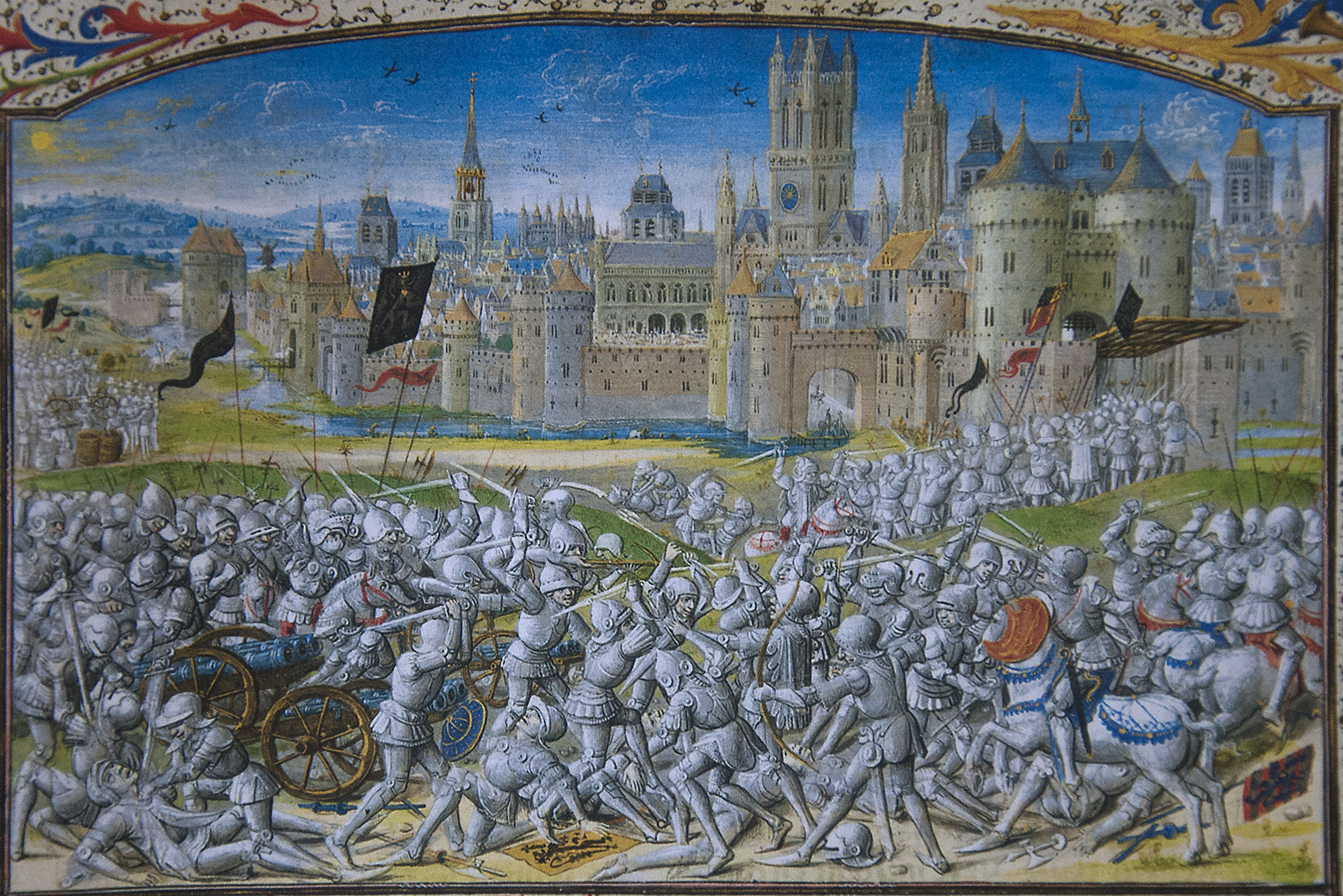
- Battle of Beverhoutsveld in Froissart's Chronicles
Date	3 May 1382
Location	Bruges
Result	Ghent victory Ghent-Bruges Canal cancelled

Belligerents
Bruges city militia County of Flanders	Ghent rebels

Commanders and leaders
Louis II of Flanders	Philip van Artevelde

Strength
"Greatly outnumbered the Ghent forces"	4,000–8,000 plus a large force of artillery

The Battle of Beverhoutsveld took place on 3 May 1382, on a field situated between the towns of Beernem, Oostkamp and Assebroek. It marked an important phase in the rebellion of Ghent (led by Philip van Artevelde) against Louis II, Count of Flanders.

== Background ==
The city of Ghent had rebelled against their lord, count Louis II of Flanders, in 1379. The powerful guilds in Ghent did not take kindly to his rule, and wanted more privileges and less interference from the count. The nearby city of Bruges was a loyal supporter of the count and this only served to fan the flames of the rivalry between the two cities, both commercial powerhouses.

The Gent-Oostende canal is one of the oldest shipping routes in Belgium. A natural watercourse between the towns of Bruges and Beernem was adapted for this shipping route. It was this piece of canal that caused the conflict between the Bruges and Ghent people.

To force Ghent to surrender, the Count of Flanders had blockaded the access roads to the city. Philip van Artevelde, the leader of the Ghent rebels, was attempting to negotiate with the Count in Doornik, but these negotiations failed and the only option was to assault the town of Bruges to force access to the sea.

== Battle ==
The army of Ghent did not immediately assault Bruges, but instead drew up in a defensive formation an hour's march outside the city. They placed their artillery on one flank to enfilade the approaching militia of Bruges.

The warriors of Bruges appeared on the battlefield after the annual Procession of the Holy Blood, a religious holiday in Bruges. The soldiers came straight from the various inns and taverns around the area, and many had stopped along the way to drink themselves into extra courage. Their discipline was poor.

As the Bruges army came in range, the Ghent artillery fired a volley of several hundred ribauldequins, a form of mobile light artillery. The Bruges army halted in confusion and the Ghent militia went over to the attack, quickly routing their opponents. The Ghent forces pursued and occupied the town of Bruges that same day. Count Louis II managed to escape and fled to the town of Rijssel.

Legend says the Ghent warriors removed the Dragon from St. Donatian's Cathedral in Bruges and transported it to Ghent to mount it on the Belfort tower there.

== Aftermath ==
Philip van Artevelde's victory caused uprisings all over Flanders; only Dendermonde and Oudenaarde remained loyal to the Count. This victory had repercussions abroad as well; uprisings and riots broke out in Holland, Leuven, Paris, Rouen and Amiens.

Philip van Artevelde died a few months later in a new battle with the Count in the Battle of Westrozebeke. Louis II of Flanders died in Saint-Omer (Sint-Omaars) in 1384.

It was only in 1613 that the cities managed to negotiate an agreement to dig the canal between Ghent and Bruges. The execution of the work was entrusted to the Dutch in the Republic of the 7 United Provinces, and the canal was opened in 1621.

A memorial plaque commemorating the battle can be found in the Bibliotheekstraat in Ghent.

== Significance in military history ==
Beverhoutsveld is recognised as one of the first battles in which gunpowder weaponry played a significant part.

== Sources ==
- Hall, Bert (1997). Weapons and Warfare in Renaissance Europe. Baltimore: Johns Hopkins. ISBN 0801855314.
- Smith, Robert; Kelly DeVries (2005). The Artillery of the Dukes of Burgundy 1363 - 1477. Woodbridge, Suffolk: Boydell & Brewer. pp. 150–1. ISBN 1843831627.
Coat of arms of the counts of Flanders.

The flag of Ghent
