= Peace of Tournai =

1385 agreement between Burgundy and Ghent

The Peace of Tournai (Vrede van Doornik in Dutch) was an agreement between the Burgundian Duke Philip II and the rebellious city of Ghent signed on 18 December 1385 which put an end to the Revolt of Ghent (1379–1385).

The treaty said that Ghent kept its privileges, that the rebels would be given amnesty and that, because it was the time of the Western Schism, Ghent would be free in recognizing the pope of its choice. However, Ghent was required to give up its treaty with kingdom of England and recognize the King of France.

== Bibliography ==
- Françoise Autrand, Charles VI le roi fou
