= Louis II of Flanders =

Count of Flanders from 1346 to 1384

- Count of Flanders, Count of Nevers, Count of Rethel, Count of Artois, Count of Burgundy
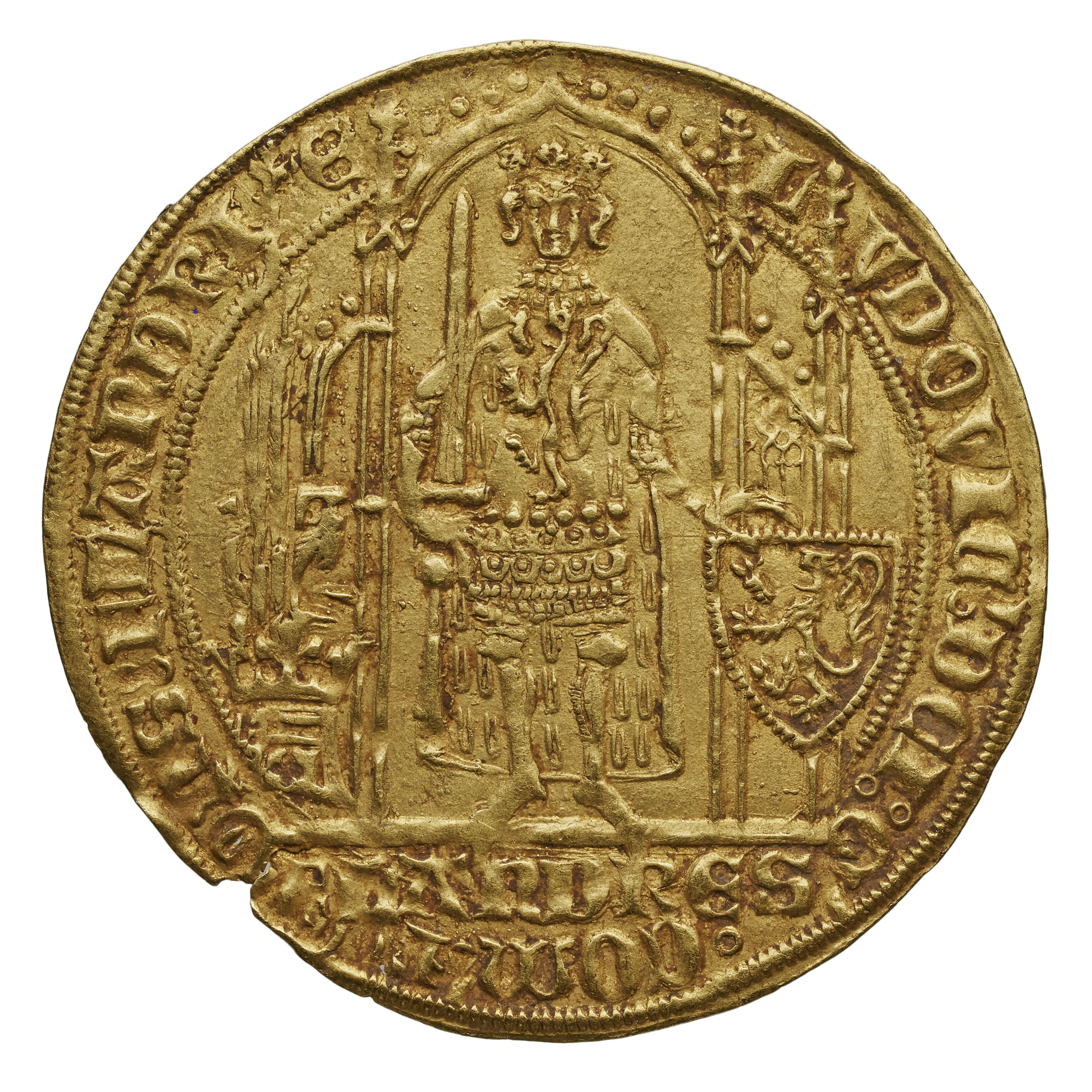
- Reign: Count of Flanders, Nevers, and Rethel (26 August 1346 – 30 January 1384); Count of Artois and Burgundy (9 May 1382 – 30 January 1384)
- Predecessor: Louis I of Flanders
- Successor: Margaret III, Countess of Flanders
- Born: 25 October 1330; Male Castle, Flanders, France
- Died: 30 January 1384 (aged 53); Saint-Omer, County of Artois, France
- Noble family: Dampierre
- Spouse: Margaret of Brabant
- Issue Detail: Margaret III, Countess of Flanders
- Father: Louis I, Count of Flanders
- Mother: Margaret I, Countess of Burgundy

Louis II (Dutch: Lodewijk; 25 October 1330 – 30 January 1384), also known as Louis of Male, a member of the House of Dampierre, was the count of Flanders, Nevers, and Rethel from 1346 to 1384, and also of Artois and Burgundy from 1382 until his death. He was the son and successor of Count Louis I of Flanders and Countess Margaret I of Burgundy, a daughter of King Philip V of France.

== Summary of his reign ==
Becoming count after his father was killed at the Battle of Crécy (26 August 1346), he broke with his father’s pro-French policies to adopt a stance closer to his subjects, skillfully navigating between the conflicting interests of the kings of France and England, who were in open war. Despite the Black Death (1348), he ensured Flanders thirty years of relative peace and economic recovery (1349–1379), a period framed by two major revolts led by the weavers of Ghent. With the support of Margaret of France, he prepared for the establishment of the House of Valois-Burgundy in the county of Flanders through his administrative reforms and the marriage of his only daughter, Margaret of Flanders. She later married Philip the Bold. This allowed for the return of Romance Flanders to the county.

== Early years: 1330–1346 ==
The son of Louis I of Flanders and Margaret I of Burgundy, he was baptized by the Bishop of Arras, Pierre Roger, who would become Pope Clement VI. As a child, he was married to Margaret of Brabant to seal the reconciliation between Duke John III of Brabant and his father. Injured but surviving the Battle of Crécy, where he witnessed his father's death, Louis of Male was knighted on the same day by Philip VI of Valois, who had taken refuge in Amiens (26 August 1346).

== Beginning of his reign: 1346–1349 ==
19th century depiction of Louis by Albrecht De Vriendt

By November, the new count was in Flanders, allowing the old comital dynasty to reconnect with the Flemings. However, the Ghent citizens, dominated by the powerful Weaver guild, sought to impose an English marriage on the count, ensuring a wool supply from the British Isles. Held under courteous guard in his capital, he used a falcon hunt as a pretext to flee to France, then to Brabant, where he married Margaret of Brabant, daughter of the French king’s ally (1347). Ghent revolted immediately (1347–1349).

But discontent in the small towns and the desire of Bruges, Lille, and Ypres to challenge Ghent's hegemony weakened the revolt, especially as the devastating Black Death epidemic struck Flanders in 1348. Unexpectedly, the count signed a neutrality treaty with the king of England (25 August 1348) and, supported by the smaller towns (Grammont, Termonde, Oudenaarde), regained control of Flanders. The Ghent weavers were eventually crushed by the fullers and other guilds (Goede Maandag, Tuesday 13 January 1349).

== A period of prosperity: 1349–1379 ==
This would be the count’s policy: constant balancing between France and England to ensure the county's neutrality. Louis of Male gained great popularity by refusing homage to the new French king John II in 1350, demanding the return of the Romance Flanders cities (Lille, Douai, Orchies) to the county, thereby reclaiming direct sovereignty over the lordship of Termonde.

Upon the death of Duke John III of Brabant, he demanded arrears from his successors Joan of Brabant and Wenceslas I of Luxembourg for the sale of Mechelen and the payment of his wife's dowry, which they refused. Louis invaded Brabant, captured Brussels (Battle of Scheut, 17 August 1356), and seized the duchy. The Brabançons revolted (October 24–29, 1356), but the count’s defensive strategy paid off: at the Peace of Ath (4 June 1357), he retained the title of Duke of Brabant for life and honor, along with his rights to succession, reclaimed Mechelen, and gained Antwerp for the county.

One of the major affairs of his reign was the marriage of his only daughter and heiress Margaret. Intense diplomatic activity surrounded the issue, as her inheritance was coveted by both the English and the French. Margaret was first married to Philip of Rouvres, son of the Queen of France Joan of Boulogne, Duke of Burgundy, Count of Burgundy, and Artois (14 May 1357), a union that heralded the return of Artois to the Flemish fold. The young duke’s death in 1361 unexpectedly returned Artois to Louis of Male, as his mother inherited it herself. With the promise of two new provinces (Artois and Franche-Comté), Margaret again became a target for suitors from both sides. Initially favoring an English marriage, Louis of Male, with the decisive support of his mother Margaret of France, ultimately arranged for her to marry the new Duke of Burgundy, Philip the Bold, younger brother of King Charles V of France, in exchange for the return of Romance Flanders (Lille, Douai, Orchies) to the county (19 June 1369). A long-standing Flemish claim was finally satisfied. Nevertheless, the count continued to pursue an independent policy, hosting allies of Edward III of England or taking a stand against the Avignon Papacy during the Western Schism, despite it being favored by the king of France.

In 1365, following the assassination of Siger II of Enghien, his men invaded Hainaut and defeated the troops of Albert I of Hainaut between Hove and Enghien.

== Political achievements ==
Louis of Male's administrative work was significant and laid the groundwork for future actions by the Burgundian rulers. To balance the power of the cities, he added a fourth entity representing the Franc of Bruges, the countryside surrounding the port, to the three traditional "members" of Flanders. He reorganized the Count’s Council (Curia) into specialized bodies (the future Council Chamber for overseeing the bailiffs' accounts, the Council Audience responsible for high jurisdiction, etc.), with the Council maintaining its role as the political affairs organ, separate from the person of the count. A sovereign bailiff, a general receiver, and a general prosecutor were also created. The count surrounded himself with recently ennobled legal experts. He also embarked on a grand construction policy, including the digging of a canal between Bruges, which he had made his principal residence, and the Lys.

== Private life ==
In his private life, Louis of Male acted as a prince of his time. He lived lavishly, maintained a zoo, surrounded himself with a court of acrobats and jugglers, organized tournaments, and spent lavishly. He is known to have fathered thirteen illegitimate children. Often short of money, he increasingly taxed the Flemish cities, which caused discontent, especially in Ypres, Bruges, and Ghent.

== The troubled end of his reign: 1379–1384 ==
His last years were marked by the bloody return of unrest. The Revolt of the White Hoods (so named due to the white hoods worn by the rebels from Ghent) broke out in 1379 and continued beyond Louis of Male’s death. The weavers regained power in Ghent (August 1379), then in the rest of northern Flanders. The count sought refuge in Lille, and after another revolt in Bruges, he managed a victory at Nevele (1381). He fled during the Battle of Beverhoutsveld (3 May 1382) when Bruges was attacked by the Ghent citizens led by Philip van Artevelde. Eventually, the royal army under Charles VI of France crushed the rebels at Battle of Roosebeke (27 November 1382). Louis II died less than two years after the rebellion which had caused great turmoil for his territories, without a legitimate male heir his holdings were passed onto his surviving daughter, Margaret III who became the last of the House of Dampierre to rule Flanders which she ruled jointly with her husband Philip II Duke of Burgundy.

== Descendants ==
From his marriage to Margaret of Brabant (6 June 1347), daughter of John III of Brabant and Marie of Évreux, he had only one daughter:

- Margaret of Male (13 April 1350 – 16 March 1405), widow of Philip of Rouvres in 1361, married Philip the Bold in 1369.

=== Illegitimate children ===
Louis of Male fathered numerous illegitimate children. Historians have identified at least thirteen by name:

- Louis, called "of Haze", married a daughter from the Landas house and was killed on 28 September 1396 in Nicopolis, Bulgaria.
- Louis, called "The Frisian", Lord of Woestyne, married Maria van Gistel and died in the same battle.
- John, called "Landless", married Wilhelmina van Nevele and also perished on the same day.
- Margaret, married a lord of Wavrin and received an annuity from Louis of Male.
- Margaret, became abbess of the Abbey of Petegem, receiving a pension.
- Peter, who died young on 3 March 1376, was buried with the Dominicans in Ghent.
- Robert, held lordships in Elverdinge and Vlamertinge. He married Anastasia d'Oultre, making him Viscount of Ypres. The marriage took place on 12 September 1419, attended by the Count of Charolais, future Duke Philip the Good, who was unaware at the time that his father, John the Fearless, had been assassinated two days earlier.
- Victor, born to Margaretha Haelshuuts, the only known mother of his illegitimate children by name, became Lord of Ursel and Wissegem. He married Jeanne of Gavre, who later remarried Simon VIII of Lalaing on 11 June 1441. He served as an admiral and a captain of Biervliet. In 1400, he was a leader of the fleet under John the Fearless but was temporarily exiled by the "four members" of Flanders. He also fathered two illegitimate children, and their mother provided them with gifts in 1427 and 1441, respectively.
- Margaret († 1415), who married Florent van Maldegem († 1374), Hector van Vuurhoute, and Zeger van Gent in succession.
- Joan († after 1420) married Théodoric, Lord of Hondschote.
- Beatrice, married Robert of Maarschalk, the chamberlain of the count of Flanders. He was a witness during the signing of Louis of Male's will.
- Catherine, married in 1390, although the identity of her spouse remains unrecorded.
- Catherine, who became a nun at the Thieuloye monastery near Arras.

Historians suggest that Louis of Male fathered at least thirteen illegitimate children by name. However, records from 1384 and later indicate there were more, whose names are unknown. That year, a record by Jonkheer Nicolaas Bonin detailed an inventory of the furnishings at the Gosnay castle at the time of Louis of Male’s death in Saint-Omer. The inventory mentioned eleven illegitimate children (four boys and seven girls) under the care of Elisabeth of Lichtervelde. Some of these children may overlap with those previously named, but several remain unidentified in historical documents.

Louis of Male took great care in arranging the education, marriages, or placements of his illegitimate children, many of whom achieved high ranks among the Flemish nobility. His legitimate daughter and the dukes of Burgundy also supported these illegitimate relatives, who proved to be loyal servants of the ducal family.

== The tomb of Louis of Male ==
Louis of Male had a chapel built next to the church of Notre-Dame de Courtrai as his intended burial site: the Chapel of the Counts. However, he was ultimately not buried there.

Instead, his remains were lavishly interred alongside his wife, Margaret of Brabant (who died in 1380), at the Saint Peter’s Collegiate Church in Lille on 1 March 1384. The tomb, made of gilded bronze, was located in the Notre-Dame-de-la-Treille chapel. Their daughter, Margaret III of Flanders, was also laid to rest there after her death on 16 March 1405 in Arras.

The tomb of Louis of Male, featuring three effigies, was visible in the Saint Peter’s Collegiate Church of Lille until the French Revolution. The church was completely destroyed in 1806, but the tomb escaped revolutionary destruction and was transported to the former town hall of Lille. However, it disappeared around 1830. Aubin-Louis Millin described the tomb, among others, in volume five of the Antiquités nationales, published in 1799.

Louis II of Flanders House of Dampierre Born: 25 October 1330 Died: 30 January 1384
Preceded by Louis I of Flanders	Count of Flanders, Nevers and Rethel; 1346–1384	Succeeded by Margaret III of Flanders; Philip the Bold
Preceded by Margaret I of Artois	Count of Artois and Burgundy; 1382–1384	Succeeded by Margaret III of Flanders; Philip the Bold

== Sources ==
- Blockmans, Wim; Prevenier, Walter (1999). Peters, Edward (ed.). The Promised Lands: The Low Countries Under Burgundian Rule, 1369-1530. Translated by Fackelman, Elizabeth. University of Pennsylvania Press.
- Bubenicek, Michelle (2002). Quand les femmes gouvernent: droit et politique au XIVe siècle:Yolande de Flandre, Droit et politique au XIV siecle (in French). Ecole des Chartes.
- Henneman, John Bell (1971). Royal Taxation in Fourteenth-Century France: The Development of War Financing, 1322-1359. Princeton University Press.
- Nicholas, David M (1992). Medieval Flanders. Routledge.
- Nicolle, David (2000). Crécy 1346: Triumph of the Longbow. Osprey.
- "Louis II, count of Flanders". Encyclopædia Britannica. Encyclopædia Britannica, inc.
