= Philip van Artevelde =

Flemish patriot

Philip van Artevelde (c. 1340 – 27 November 1382) was a Flemish patriot, the son of Jacob van Artevelde. Because of his father's prominence he was godson of English queen Philippa of Hainault, who held him in her arms during his baptism.

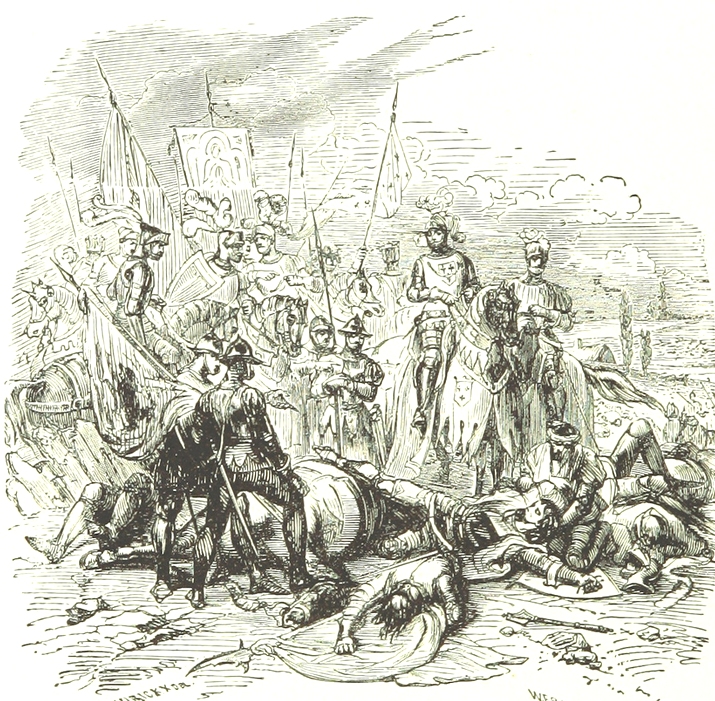
Dead body of Philip van Artevelde at the Battle of Roosebeke

Largely due to his father's name and the memory of his godmother, Philip was a leader of Ghent in 1381 at the head of the burgher's rebellion against Count Louis II of Flanders. Early success after the Battle of Beverhoutsveld, led to the capture of Bruges and most of Flanders by the rebels, but Philip perished in the crush of bodies at the Battle of Roosebeke in 1382.

His body was displayed before fourteen-years old French king Charles VI and then hanged from a tree. After his death the command of Ghent was taken up by Franz Ackerman.

His life was commemorated in a tragic play by Sir Henry Taylor in 1834.
