= List of territories of the Valois dukes of Burgundy =

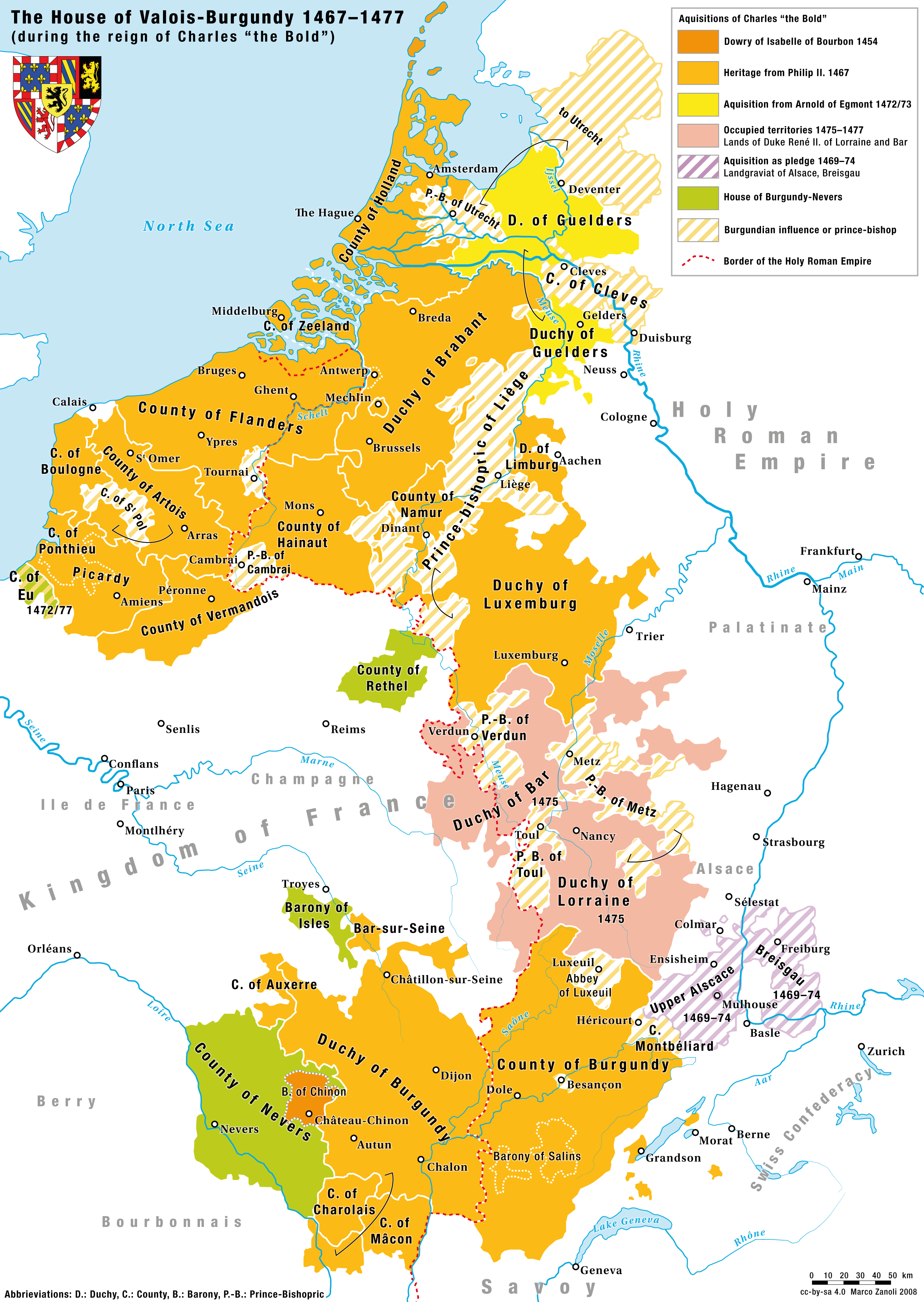
Valois Burgundy at its greatest extent under Charles the Bold

From 1363 to 1477, the Valois dukes of Burgundy, a cadet branch of the French royal House of Valois, ruled over a domain that ultimately encompassed much of eastern France and the Low Countries effectively as independent princes. Although sometimes referred to as the Burgundian state, it was in fact a composite monarchy, comprising an array of duchies, counties and lordships acquired by the dukes over time by a number of means and joined in personal union.

== Development ==
The Duchy of Burgundy itself was granted to the dynasty's founder Philip the Bold in 1363 by his father the French king, John II. The dynasty's domains were then substantially added to, mainly by Philip himself and his grandson, Philip the Good.

Philip the Bold married Margaret of Flanders, and when her father died in 1384, he acquired through her inheritance not only the adjacent County of Burgundy and other lands in eastern France, but also Flanders in the Low Countries, with its concentration of wealthy urban areas. The next period of major expansion was in the 1420s and 1430s when Philip the Good added further extensive domains by purchase, diplomacy and inheritance. These were in eastern and north eastern France, but more significantly, in the Low Countries as well. The Brabantine inheritance of 1430 and the cession of Jacqueline of Hainaut's lands in 1433, when added to Flanders, meant that Philip's territories would include a powerful contiguous domain covering most of the Low Countries and referred to as the Burgundian Netherlands.

Finally, the last Valois duke, Charles the Bold, through almost continuous warfare after his accession in 1467, briefly extended the domains further but was killed in battle in 1477 without a male heir, the last of the dynasty being his daughter Mary of Burgundy. The Duchy of Burgundy itself was then absorbed back into France and most of the remaining territories, as a result of Mary's marriage to Maximilian of Habsburg, passed to the House of Habsburg, forming part of a much larger empire.

== Territories of the Valois dukes of Burgundy ==
The dukes' lands straddled the border areas between the Kingdom of France and the Holy Roman Empire and were divided into two groups of possessions. In the south was the Duchy of Burgundy itself, and the neighbouring County of Burgundy (the modern Franche-Comté), a fief of the Empire. These possessions were separated from the Burgundian Netherlands in the north, where the dukes derived most of their wealth, power and prestige. (Note: The two groups of domains were referred to as "our lands over here" and "our lands over there" (pays de par-delà and pays de par-deçà), originally from the perspective of where the duke happened to be when the reference was made. However, reflecting the changing focus of the Burgundian state, the Low Countries territories came to be permanently called the "lands over here" and the southern domains the "lands over there". Nevertheless, Burgundy, as the dukes' original domain, continued to be at the heart of the polity's identity and, for example, the duke's subjects in the Low Countries even began referring to themselves as "Burgundians".) Charles the Bold briefly united the southern and northern domains through conquest but these gains were lost with his death in 1477.

The following is a list of territories held, at any time, by a Valois duke of Burgundy, either in their own right or jure uxoris. (Note: Not included are territories held by other members of the House of Valois-Burgundy, such as the Prince-Bishopric of Cambrai where Philip the Good had his half-brother, John, appointed as bishop or the County of Eu which a descendant of Philip the Bold, John of Nevers, inherited through his mother. Also excluded are territories where the duke of Burgundy effectively exercised political control but was not the ruler, such as the Prince-Bishopric of Liège or the Prince-Bishopric of Utrecht.)

Territory	Acquired by	Date acquired	Means of acquisition	Subsequent history
Duchy of Burgundy	Philip the Bold	1363	Granted to Philip as an appanage by his father John II of France.	Following the death of the last Valois duke, Charles the Bold at the Battle of Nancy, 1477, the Duchy returned to the French crown.
Lordship of Jaucourt	Philip the Bold	1367	Purchased by Philip from Jeanne de Jaucourt.	On Philip's death, passed to Philip of Nevers and his descendants.
Castellanies in Champagne	Philip the Bold	1382	Beaufort, Nogent-l'Artaud, Lassicourt, and Soulaines granted to Philip by Charles VI.	On Philip's death in 1404, returned to the French crown.
County of Burgundy	Philip the Bold	1384	The territories were inherited by Philip's wife, Margaret of Flanders, from her father Louis of Male, Count of Flanders who died in 1384. Philip then took control of the territories and assumed the various comital and other titles. Margaret died in 1405, a year after Philip, and the territories were inherited by the next duke, John the Fearless, except Nevers, Rethel, Isle, Chaource, Villemaur and Donzy.	Seized by Louis XI after Charles the Bold's death but returned to Charles's heirs, the House of Habsburg, by the Treaty of Senlis, 1493.
Lordship of Salins	Philip the Bold	1384	The territories were inherited by Philip's wife, Margaret of Flanders, from her father Louis of Male, Count of Flanders who died in 1384. Philip then took control of the territories and assumed the various comital and other titles. Margaret died in 1405, a year after Philip, and the territories were inherited by the next duke, John the Fearless, except Nevers, Rethel, Isle, Chaource, Villemaur and Donzy.	Seized by Louis XI after Charles the Bold's death but returned to Charles's heirs, the House of Habsburg, by the Treaty of Senlis, 1493.
County of Artois	Philip the Bold	1384	The territories were inherited by Philip's wife, Margaret of Flanders, from her father Louis of Male, Count of Flanders who died in 1384. Philip then took control of the territories and assumed the various comital and other titles. Margaret died in 1405, a year after Philip, and the territories were inherited by the next duke, John the Fearless, except Nevers, Rethel, Isle, Chaource, Villemaur and Donzy.	Seized by Louis XI after Charles the Bold's death but returned to Charles's heirs, the House of Habsburg, by the Treaty of Senlis, 1493.
Lordship of Mechelen	Philip the Bold	1384	The territories were inherited by Philip's wife, Margaret of Flanders, from her father Louis of Male, Count of Flanders who died in 1384. Philip then took control of the territories and assumed the various comital and other titles. Margaret died in 1405, a year after Philip, and the territories were inherited by the next duke, John the Fearless, except Nevers, Rethel, Isle, Chaource, Villemaur and Donzy.	Following Charles the Bold's death in 1477, Flanders passed to the House of Habsburg through marriage to Charles's daughter and heir, Mary, as did Mechelen.
Walloon Flanders	Philip the Bold	1384	The territories were inherited by Philip's wife, Margaret of Flanders, from her father Louis of Male, Count of Flanders who died in 1384. Philip then took control of the territories and assumed the various comital and other titles. Margaret died in 1405, a year after Philip, and the territories were inherited by the next duke, John the Fearless, except Nevers, Rethel, Isle, Chaource, Villemaur and Donzy.	Following Charles the Bold's death in 1477, Flanders passed to the House of Habsburg through marriage to Charles's daughter and heir, Mary, as did Mechelen.
County of Flanders	Philip the Bold	1384	The territories were inherited by Philip's wife, Margaret of Flanders, from her father Louis of Male, Count of Flanders who died in 1384. Philip then took control of the territories and assumed the various comital and other titles. Margaret died in 1405, a year after Philip, and the territories were inherited by the next duke, John the Fearless, except Nevers, Rethel, Isle, Chaource, Villemaur and Donzy.	Following Charles the Bold's death in 1477, Flanders passed to the House of Habsburg through marriage to Charles's daughter and heir, Mary, as did Mechelen.
Isle, Chaource and Villemaur	Philip the Bold	1384	The territories were inherited by Philip's wife, Margaret of Flanders, from her father Louis of Male, Count of Flanders who died in 1384. Philip then took control of the territories and assumed the various comital and other titles. Margaret died in 1405, a year after Philip, and the territories were inherited by the next duke, John the Fearless, except Nevers, Rethel, Isle, Chaource, Villemaur and Donzy.	By 1407, Nevers, Rethel, Isle, Chaource, Villemaur and Donzy had been vested in Philip's youngest son, Philip of Nevers and his descendants.
Barony of Donzy	Philip the Bold	1384	The territories were inherited by Philip's wife, Margaret of Flanders, from her father Louis of Male, Count of Flanders who died in 1384. Philip then took control of the territories and assumed the various comital and other titles. Margaret died in 1405, a year after Philip, and the territories were inherited by the next duke, John the Fearless, except Nevers, Rethel, Isle, Chaource, Villemaur and Donzy.	By 1407, Nevers, Rethel, Isle, Chaource, Villemaur and Donzy had been vested in Philip's youngest son, Philip of Nevers and his descendants.
County of Rethel	Philip the Bold	1384	The territories were inherited by Philip's wife, Margaret of Flanders, from her father Louis of Male, Count of Flanders who died in 1384. Philip then took control of the territories and assumed the various comital and other titles. Margaret died in 1405, a year after Philip, and the territories were inherited by the next duke, John the Fearless, except Nevers, Rethel, Isle, Chaource, Villemaur and Donzy.	By 1407, Nevers, Rethel, Isle, Chaource, Villemaur and Donzy had been vested in Philip's youngest son, Philip of Nevers and his descendants.
County of Nevers	Philip the Bold	1384	The territories were inherited by Philip's wife, Margaret of Flanders, from her father Louis of Male, Count of Flanders who died in 1384. Philip then took control of the territories and assumed the various comital and other titles. Margaret died in 1405, a year after Philip, and the territories were inherited by the next duke, John the Fearless, except Nevers, Rethel, Isle, Chaource, Villemaur and Donzy.	By 1407, Nevers, Rethel, Isle, Chaource, Villemaur and Donzy had been vested in Philip's youngest son, Philip of Nevers and his descendants.
County of Charolais	Philip the Bold	1390	Purchased by Philip for 60,000 francs from John III, Count of Armagnac.	Seized by France in 1477, but returned to Charles the Bold's Habsburg heirs in 1493.
Bailiwick of Mâcon	John the Fearless	1417	Seized by force from the French crown, confirmed by Treaty of Arras 1435.	Annexed by Louis XI in 1477.
County of Tonnerre	John the Fearless	1419	Conquest from Louis de Chalons confirmed by royal grant in 1419.	Confirmed by Treaty of Arras 1435 as a royal enclave with the duke having administration rights.
Péronne, Roye and Montdidier	Philip the Good	1420	Ceded by Charles VII and confirmed by the Treaty of Arras 1435.	In 1477, Louis XI of France annexed Boulogne, Auxerre, Bar-sur-Seine, Péronne, Roye and Montdidier.
County of Boulogne	Philip the Good	1423	Seized in 1423 and confirmed by the Treaty of Arras 1435.	In 1477, Louis XI of France annexed Boulogne, Auxerre, Bar-sur-Seine, Péronne, Roye and Montdidier.
County of Auxerre	Philip the Good	1424	Transferred by Henry VI, confirmed by Treaty of Arras 1435.	In 1477, Louis XI of France annexed Boulogne, Auxerre, Bar-sur-Seine, Péronne, Roye and Montdidier.
Castellany of Bar-sur-Seine	Philip the Good	1424	Transferred by Henry VI, confirmed by Treaty of Arras 1435.	In 1477, Louis XI of France annexed Boulogne, Auxerre, Bar-sur-Seine, Péronne, Roye and Montdidier.
County of Namur	Philip the Good	1429	Bequeathed by John of Namur who had been paid 132,000 crowns.	Following Charles the Bold's death in 1477, the territories passed to the House of Habsburg through marriage to Charles's daughter and heir, Mary.
Duchy of Limburg	Philip the Good	1430	Philip's uncle, Anthony, inherited Brabant from his great aunt in 1406. Anthony's son, Philip of St. Pol, bequeathed it to Philip on his death in 1430. Antwerp was a dependency of Brabant, as was Limburg and the Lands of Overmaas.	Following Charles the Bold's death in 1477, the territories passed to the House of Habsburg through marriage to Charles's daughter and heir, Mary.
Lands of Overmaas	Philip the Good	1430	Philip's uncle, Anthony, inherited Brabant from his great aunt in 1406. Anthony's son, Philip of St. Pol, bequeathed it to Philip on his death in 1430. Antwerp was a dependency of Brabant, as was Limburg and the Lands of Overmaas.	Following Charles the Bold's death in 1477, the territories passed to the House of Habsburg through marriage to Charles's daughter and heir, Mary.
Margraviate of Antwerp (Note: In fact, the margraviate of Antwerp first came into Burgundian hands when Philip the Bold acquired it as part of Margaret of Flanders' inheritance in 1384. After Philip's death in 1404, Antwerp did not pass to the next duke, John the Fearless, but instead was vested in his younger brother, Anthony who also acquired Brabant. It again became a possession of a duke of Burgundy when Philip the Good inherited the margraviate on the death of Anthony's son, Philip of St. Pol, in 1430.)	Philip the Good	1430	Philip's uncle, Anthony, inherited Brabant from his great aunt in 1406. Anthony's son, Philip of St. Pol, bequeathed it to Philip on his death in 1430. Antwerp was a dependency of Brabant, as was Limburg and the Lands of Overmaas.	Following Charles the Bold's death in 1477, the territories passed to the House of Habsburg through marriage to Charles's daughter and heir, Mary.
Duchy of Brabant (Note: The Duke of Brabant was also "Duke of Lothier" (that is, of Lower Lorraine). This was a titular honorific only, without any territory attached to it.)	Philip the Good	1430	Philip's uncle, Anthony, inherited Brabant from his great aunt in 1406. Anthony's son, Philip of St. Pol, bequeathed it to Philip on his death in 1430. Antwerp was a dependency of Brabant, as was Limburg and the Lands of Overmaas.	Following Charles the Bold's death in 1477, the territories passed to the House of Habsburg through marriage to Charles's daughter and heir, Mary.
County of Holland (Note: The Count of Holland was also "Lord of Friesland". This was a titular lordship only, without political reality, but the title had, nevertheless, been used by the Counts of Holland since the 13th century. In fact, unusually, feudalism did not exist in medieval Friesland and it had no lord (the Frisian freedom). Although the Emperor Maximilian I had attempted to impose Albert of Saxony as imperial lord over the area, it was not until Charles V's annexation in 1524 that the Lordship of Friesland or Frisia was created.)	Philip the Good	1433	In personal union since the 13th century. Philip increased his influence over the counties leading the ruler, Jacqueline of Hainaut, to cede her rights to him in 1433.	Following Charles the Bold's death in 1477, the territories passed to the House of Habsburg through marriage to Charles's daughter and heir, Mary.
County of Zeeland	Philip the Good	1433	In personal union since the 13th century. Philip increased his influence over the counties leading the ruler, Jacqueline of Hainaut, to cede her rights to him in 1433.	Following Charles the Bold's death in 1477, the territories passed to the House of Habsburg through marriage to Charles's daughter and heir, Mary.
County of Hainaut	Philip the Good	1433	In personal union since the 13th century. Philip increased his influence over the counties leading the ruler, Jacqueline of Hainaut, to cede her rights to him in 1433.	Following Charles the Bold's death in 1477, the territories passed to the House of Habsburg through marriage to Charles's daughter and heir, Mary.
County of Ponthieu	Philip the Good	1435	Transferred to Philip by the Treaty of Arras, 1435	In 1477, Louis XI of France annexed the Somme towns, Ponthieu and Vermandois.
County of Vermandois	Philip the Good	1435	Transferred to Philip by the Treaty of Arras, 1435	In 1477, Louis XI of France annexed the Somme towns, Ponthieu and Vermandois.
The Somme towns	Philip the Good	1435	Transferred to Philip by the Treaty of Arras, 1435	In 1477, Louis XI of France annexed the Somme towns, Ponthieu and Vermandois.
Duchy of Luxembourg	Philip the Good	1443	Seized in 1443. Philip paid the ruler, Elizabeth of Görlitz, a pension of 7,000 florins per year for inheritance rights. Succeeded on her death in 1451.	Following Charles the Bold's death in 1477, the duchy passed to the House of Habsburg through marriage to Charles's daughter and heir, Mary.
Lordship of Château-Chinon	Charles the Bold	1454	Through Charles's marriage with Isabella of Bourbon	Passed to Charles's Habsburg heirs by Treaty of Senlis 1493
County of Ferrette	Charles the Bold	1469	Acquired by Treaty of Saint-Omer from Sigismund of Habsburg as security for a loan of 50,000 Rhenish florins.	Lost in 1474 as a result of rebellion in Alsace.
Breisgau	Charles the Bold	1469	Acquired by Treaty of Saint-Omer from Sigismund of Habsburg as security for a loan of 50,000 Rhenish florins.	Lost in 1474 as a result of rebellion in Alsace.
Landgraviate of Upper Alsace (Note: The legal rights acquired in the territories were relatively limited. In addition to Sigismund being able to recover the domains on repayment of the loan, much of the lands were already mortgaged with the creditors having significant pre-existing rights. The attempt to enforce full Burgundian control, despite this, led to a rebellion and loss of the territories in 1474.)	Charles the Bold	1469	Acquired by Treaty of Saint-Omer from Sigismund of Habsburg as security for a loan of 50,000 Rhenish florins.	Lost in 1474 as a result of rebellion in Alsace.
County of Zutphen	Charles the Bold	1473	Charles seized the Duchy by force in 1473. Shortly before Charles's invasion Arnold, Duke of Guelders died and left the Duchy to him in his will. The County of Zutphen was a dependency.	Guelders re-asserted its independence on Charles's death 1477. His Habsburg heirs attempted to recover the Duchy. Achieved by his great-grandson, Charles V, in 1543.
Duchy of Guelders	Charles the Bold	1473	Charles seized the Duchy by force in 1473. Shortly before Charles's invasion Arnold, Duke of Guelders died and left the Duchy to him in his will. The County of Zutphen was a dependency.	Guelders re-asserted its independence on Charles's death 1477. His Habsburg heirs attempted to recover the Duchy. Achieved by his great-grandson, Charles V, in 1543.
Duchy of Bar	Charles the Bold	1475	In 1475, Charles seized Lorraine by force from René II, Duke of Lorraine and had himself installed as Duke in December of that year. Bar, a dependency of Lorraine, was occupied as well.	With Charles's defeat and death at the Battle of Nancy, January 1477, René II recovered the Duchies.
Duchy of Lorraine	Charles the Bold	1475	In 1475, Charles seized Lorraine by force from René II, Duke of Lorraine and had himself installed as Duke in December of that year. Bar, a dependency of Lorraine, was occupied as well.	With Charles's defeat and death at the Battle of Nancy, January 1477, René II recovered the Duchies.

== Bibliography ==
- Arnade, Peter (2018). Realms of Ritual: Burgundian Ceremony and Civic Life in Late Medieval Ghent. Cornell University Press. ISBN 978-1-5017-2067-3.
- Beik, William (2009). A Social and Cultural History of Early Modern France. Cambridge University Press. ISBN 978-0-521-88309-2.
- Bicheno, Hugh (2016). Blood Royal: The Wars of Lancaster and York, 1462-1485. Bloomsbury. ISBN 978-1-78185-967-4.
- Bloch, Marc (2014) [1st published 1961]. Feudal Society. Taylor & Francis. ISBN 978-1-317-67756-7.
- Blockmans, Wim; Prevenier, Walter (1999). The Promised Lands: The Low Countries Under Burgundian Rule, 1369-1530. University of Pennsylvania Press. ISBN 978-0-8122-1382-9.
- Blockmans, Wim (2006). "The formation of a political union, 1300-1588". In Blom, J.C.H.; Lamberts, E. (eds.). History of the Low Countries. Berghahn Books. ISBN 978-1-84545-272-8.
- Douglas Smith, Robert T.; DeVries, Kelly (2005). The Artillery of the Dukes of Burgundy, 1363-1477. Boydell Press. ISBN 978-1-84383-162-4.
- Duteil, Jean-Pierre (2024). Les ducs de Bourgogne (in French). Editions Ellipses. ISBN 978-2-340-09706-3.
- Edmundson, George (2018) [1st published 1922]. History of Holland. Outlook Verlag. ISBN 978-3-7340-5543-0.
- Emery, Anthony (2015). Seats of Power in Europe during the Hundred Years War: An Architectural Study from 1330 to 1480. Oxbow Books. ISBN 978-1-78570-104-7.
- Gaussen, Alfred (1861). Portefeuille archéologique de la Champagne (in French). Jardeaux-Ray.
- Gauvard, Claude (2019). La France au Moyen Âge du Ve au XVe siècle (in French). Humensis. ISBN 978-2-13-081800-7.
- Greenfeld, Lisa (2009). The Spirit of Capitalism. Harvard University Press. ISBN 978-0-674-03792-2.
- Hay, Denys (2016). Europe in the Fourteenth and Fifteenth Centuries. Taylor & Francis. ISBN 978-1-317-87191-0.
- Kekewich, Margaret L. (2008). The Good King: René of Anjou and Fifteenth Century Europe. Palgrave Macmillan UK. ISBN 978-0-230-58221-7.
- Kennedy, James C. (2017). A Concise History of the Netherlands. Cambridge University Press. ISBN 978-0-521-87588-2.
- Knecht, Robert (2007). The Valois: Kings of France 1328-1589. Bloomsbury Academic. ISBN 978-1-85285-522-2.
- Kooi, Christine (2022). Reformation in the Low Countries, 1500-1620. Cambridge University Press. ISBN 978-1-316-51352-1.
- Krahn, Cornelius (2012). Dutch Anabaptism: Origin, Spread, Life and Thought (1450–1600). Springer Netherlands. ISBN 978-94-015-0609-0.
- Lalanne, Ludovic (1877). Dictionnaire historique de la France (in French). Hachette.
- Le Bas, Philippe (1863). "Jaucourt". France: dictionnaire encyclopédique. Vol. 9. Firmin Didot frères.
- Lecuppre-Desjardin, Élodie (2022). The Illusion of the Burgundian State. Manchester University Press. ISBN 978-1-5261-4433-1.
- McDonald, R. Thomas (1995). "Boulogne-sur-Mer". In Kibler, William W.; Zinn, Grover A. (eds.). Medieval France: An Encyclopedia. Garland. ISBN 978-0-8240-4444-2.
- Monter, E. William (2007). A Bewitched Duchy: Lorraine and Its Dukes, 1477-1736. Libr. Droz. ISBN 978-2-600-01165-5.
- Munro, J.H. (2015). Money in the Pre-Industrial World: Bullion, Debasements and Coin Substitutes. Taylor & Francis. ISBN 978-1-317-32191-0.
- Potter, David (2003). War and Government in the French Provinces. Cambridge University Press. ISBN 978-0-521-89300-8.
- Prak, Maarten (2023). The Dutch Republic in the Seventeenth Century. Cambridge University Press. ISBN 978-1-009-24059-8.
- Remy, Andreas (2011). "Battles in Fifteenth Century Urban Chronicles". In Curry, A.; Bell, A.R. (eds.). Journal of Medieval Military History: Soldiers, Weapons and Armies in the Fifteenth Century. Vol. IX. Boydell Press. ISBN 978-1-84383-668-1.
- Scordia, Lydwine (2016). "The Wolf, the Shepherd and the Whale: Critiquing the King through metaphor in the reign of Louis XI". In Brown-Grant, Rosalind; Hedeman, Anne D.; Ribémont, Bernard (eds.). Textual and Visual Representations of Power and Justice in Medieval France: Manuscripts and Early Printed Books. Taylor & Francis. ISBN 978-1-351-89545-3.
- Small, Graeme (1997). George Chastelain and the Shaping of Valois Burgundy: Political and Historical Culture at Court in the Fifteenth Century. Boydell Press. ISBN 978-0-86193-237-5.
- Stein, Robert (2010). "Introduction". In Stein, R.; Pollmann, J. (eds.). Networks, Regions and Nations: Shaping Identities in the Low Countries, 1300-1650. Brill. ISBN 978-90-04-18024-6.
- Stein, Robert (2017). Magnanimous Dukes and Rising States: The Unification of the Burgundian Netherlands, 1380-1480. Oxford University Press. ISBN 978-0-19-875710-8.
- Tervoort, Ad (2004). The iter italicum and the Northern Netherlands: Dutch Students at Italian Universities and Their Role in the Netherlands' Society (1426-1575). Brill. ISBN 978-90-474-0651-8.
- Vanderjagt, Arjo (2003). "The Princely Culture of the Valois Dukes of Burgundy". In Gosman, M.; MacDonald, A. A.; Vanderjagt, A. J. (eds.). Princes and Princely Culture 1450-1650. Vol. 1. Brill. ISBN 978-90-04-25352-0.
- Vanthemsche, Guy; De Peuter, Roger (2023). A Concise History of Belgium. Cambridge University Press. ISBN 978-0-521-19241-5.
- Vaughan, Richard (2002a) [1st published 1962]. Philip the Bold: The Formation of the Burgundian State. Boydell Press. ISBN 978-0-85115-915-7.
- Vaughan, Richard (2002b) [1st published 1966]. John the Fearless: The Growth of Burgundian Power. Boydell Press. ISBN 978-0-85115-916-4.
- Vaughan, Richard (2002c) [1st published 1970]. Philip the Good: The Apogee of Burgundy. Boydell Press. ISBN 978-0-85115-917-1.
- Vaughan, Richard (2002d) [1st published 1973]. Charles the Bold: The Last Valois Duke of Burgundy. Boydell Press. ISBN 978-0-85115-918-8.
- Wagner, John A. (2001). "Burgundy". Encyclopedia of the Wars of the Roses. Bloomsbury. ISBN 978-1-57607-575-3.
