= Jean de Bourgogne =

Jean de Bourgogne may refer to:

- John II, Count of Nevers (1415–1491), French nobility
- John IV, Duke of Brabant (1403–1427), Flemish nobility
- John the Fearless (1371–1419), Burgundian nobility
- John Mandeville, supposed medieval travel writer
- John of Burgundy, Bishop of Cambrai (1404–1479)
- Juan de Borgoña (c. 1470–1534), Spanish painter
