= Burgundian State =

Territories of the Dukes of Burgundy

States of the Duke of Burgundy États du duc de Bourgogne (French)
- 1384–1482
- Above: Ducal banner Below: Cross of Burgundy Coat of arms

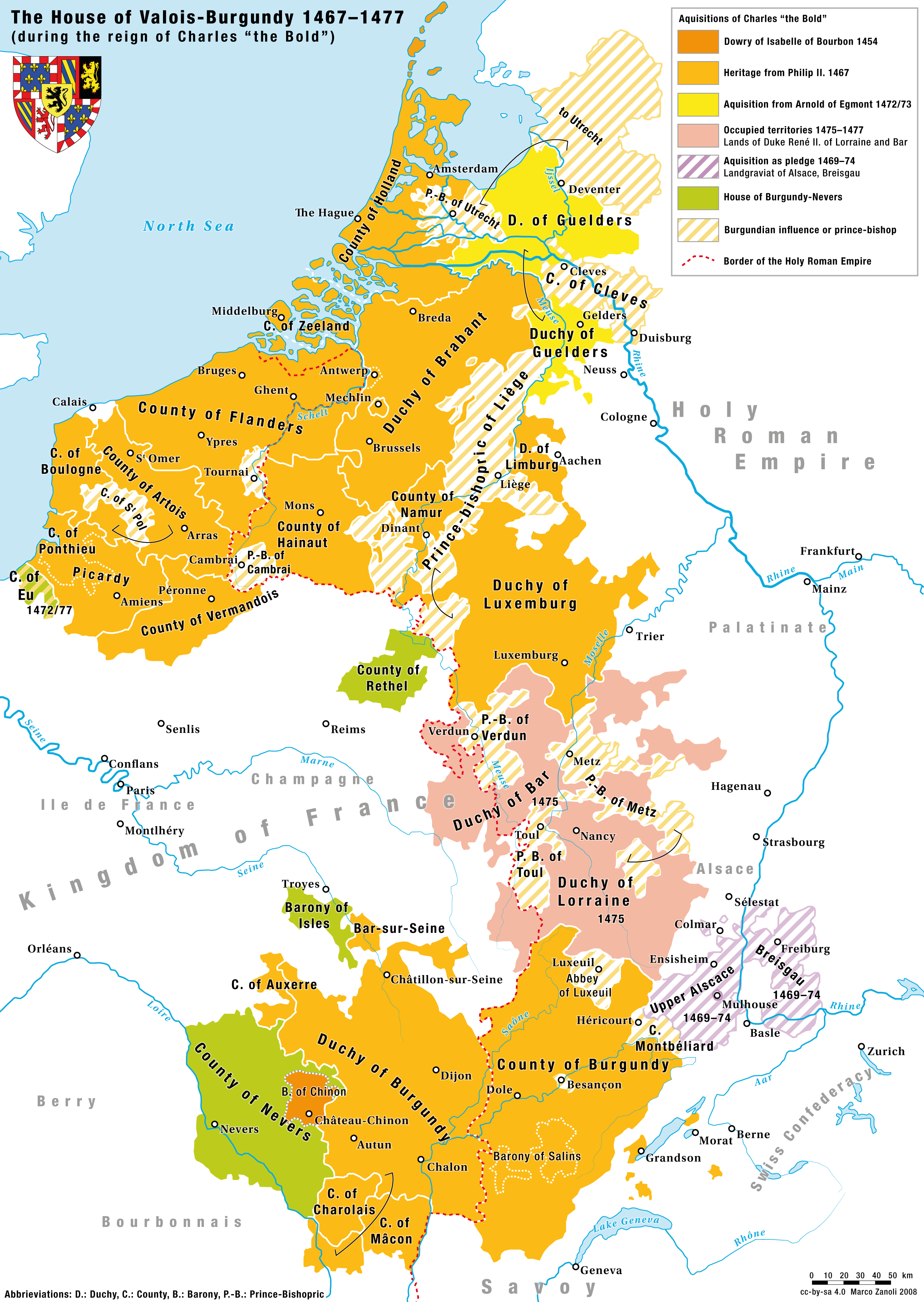
- The Burgundian State at its greatest extent, under Charles the Bold
- Status: Personal union
- Common languages: Latin, Middle French, Middle Dutch
- Religion: Roman Catholicism
- Government: Monarchy
- Duke of Burgundy
  - 1363–1404: Philip the Bold
  - 1404–1419: John the Fearless
  - 1419–1467: Philip the Good
  - 1467–1477: Charles the Bold
  - 1477–1482: Mary of Burgundy
- Legislature: States General of the Netherlands and Estates of Burgundy
- Historical era: Late Middle Ages
  - Accession to County of Flanders: 30 January 1384
  - First Treaty of Arras: 21 September 1435
  - Battle of Nancy: 5 January 1477
  - Mary's death: 27 March 1482
  - Second Treaty of Arras: 23 December 1482
Succeeded by
| Habsburg Monarchy |
| Kingdom of France |
| Holy Roman Empire |
| Habsburg Netherlands |

The Burgundian State (French: État bourguignon [eta buʁɡiɲɔ̃]; Dutch: Bourgondische Rijk [burˈɣɔndisə ˈrɛik]) was a composite monarchy ruled by the Dukes of Burgundy from the late 14th to the late 15th centuries, and which ultimately comprised not only the Duchy and County of Burgundy but also the Burgundian Netherlands. The latter, acquired piecemeal over time and largely through inheritance, became substantial and a principal source of wealth for the state. The Dukes were members of the House of Valois-Burgundy, a cadet branch of the French royal House of Valois, and the complex of territories they ruled is sometimes referred to as Valois Burgundy. The term "Burgundian State" was coined by historians and was not in contemporary use; the polity remained a collection of separate duchies and counties in personal union under the Duke of Burgundy.

It is regarded as one of the major powers in Europe of the 15th century. The Dukes of Burgundy were among the wealthiest and the most powerful princes in Europe and were sometimes called "Grand Dukes of the West". Including the thriving regions of Flanders and Brabant, the Burgundian State was a major centre of trade and commerce and a focal point of courtly culture that set the fashion for European royal houses and their courts. It nearly turned into a kingdom in its own right, but Charles the Bold's early death at the Battle of Nancy put an end to his Lotharingian dream and his legacy passed to the House of Habsburg through the marriage of his daughter Mary to Maximilian of Austria. Meanwhile Picardy and the Duchy of Burgundy were conquered by the King of France.

The partition of the Burgundian heritage marked the beginning of the centuries-long French–Habsburg rivalry and played a pivotal role in European politics long after Burgundy had lost its role as an independent political identity. With the abdication of Emperor Charles V in 1555, the Burgundian Netherlands passed to the Spanish Empire of King Philip II. During the Dutch Revolt, or the Eighty Years' War (1568–1648), the northern provinces of the Low Countries gained their independence from Spanish rule and formed the Dutch Republic (now the Netherlands). The southern provinces remained under Spanish rule until the 18th century and became known as the Spanish Netherlands, or Southern Netherlands (corresponding roughly to present day Belgium, Luxembourg and northern Hauts-de-France).

== Historical concept ==
The notion of a "Burgundian State" was coined in the 19th century by the Belgian historian Henri Pirenne in his Histoire de Belgique to describe what he saw as the precursor of the Belgian state. In his nationalist view, the Dukes of Burgundy were the creators of a Burgundian or Belgian nation. The Dutch historian Johan Huizinga reused the concept out of convenience at the beginning of the 20th century. In 1999, Bertrand Schnerb popularised the expression in France with a monograph named The Burgundian State.

That use is, however, controversial among historians. Though he used it, Huizinga noted that the "Burgundian State" was a creation of modern historiography and was not an entity that its contemporaries recognised. Many historians, especially historians of law, Belgian and Dutch historians, argue that legally speaking, the lands of the dukes formed a collection of princely estates, rather than an actual state. As such, they call those lands "Valois Burgundy", "Burgundian states", "Great Principality of Burgundy", "Burgundian Union" or "Burgundian Commonwealth".

Indeed, the Burgundian State remained a personal union of territories constituting a "composite monarchy" rather than a state. The provinces shared no common legislation, although the dukes created common institutions. At the time, there was no name to describe the territorial complex otherwise than "the lands and estates of the duke of Burgundy". The last dukes of the Valois dynasty, however, tried to rally the various populations around symbols such as the Cross of Burgundy and the Order of the Golden Fleece. Under Charles the Bold, who wanted to create a kingdom of his own, propaganda insisted that the Belgae were the common ancestors for all of his lands. The Leo Belgicus appeared after that to symbolise the unity of the Low Countries.

Furthermore, the Burgundian State was not a de jure sovereign state. The dukes of Burgundy were nominal vassals of either the king of France or the Holy Roman Emperor, even if they acted as sovereigns. The authority of the emperor was highly hypothetical, but in most of their French fiefs, for instance, their judgements could be challenged before the Parlement of Paris. Charles the Bold created the Parliament of Mechelen to avoid this.

Following Johan Huizinga, Marc Boone and Wim Blockmans ironically concluded that a true Burgundian State existed only from the loss of the Duchy of Burgundy and the extinction of the Burgundian dynasty to the Dutch Revolt.

== History ==
=== Origins ===
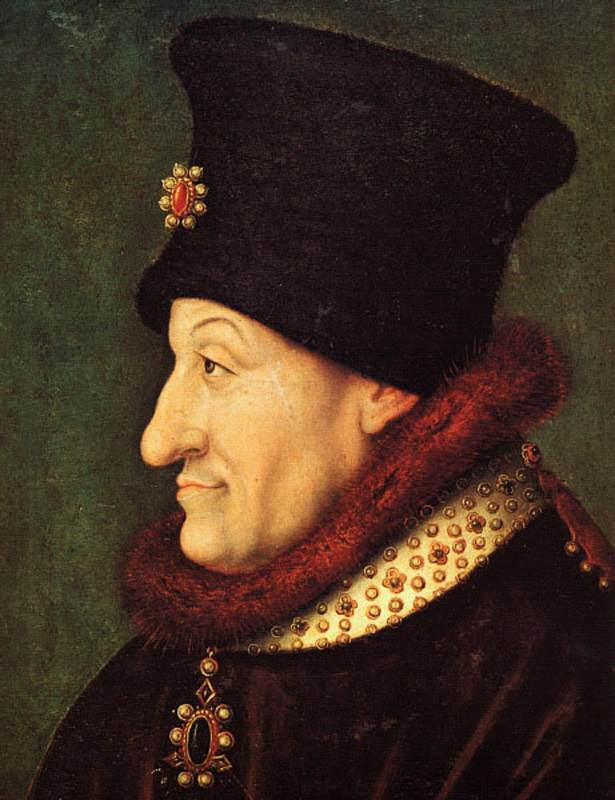
Anonymous portrait of Duke Philip the Bold

The Capetian House of Burgundy became extinct when Duke Philip I died in 1361, before he was able to consummate the marriage with Margaret of Dampierre, heiress of Count Louis II of Flanders. On 28 December 1361 John II of France, the second Valois king, successfully claimed the duchy. The duchy did not merge into the royal domain; it remained a distinct feudal entity, with the Burgundian estates firmly opposing annexation.

In January 1362, John II of France had appointed Henri of Bar, Lord of Pierrefort, as the initial governor, but as early as 25 January 1362, John appointed John of Melun, Count of Tancarville as governor of Burgundy. He later decided to give it as a fief to his youngest son, known as Philip the Bold, who was officially recognized as Duke of Burgundy and First Peer of France on 2 June 1364.

The same year, Edmund of Langley, son of Edward III of England, became engaged to Margaret of Flanders, daughter of the Count Louis II of Flanders and heiress to Flanders, Artois, Rethel, Nevers and the Free County of Burgundy. King Charles V of France could not let this marriage happen. Since Edmund and Margaret were cousins, they needed a papal dispensation to marry, which Pope Urban V refused them because of lobbying by Charles, who wanted to marry Margaret to his younger brother, Philip the Bold, Duke of Burgundy. The Count of Flanders, eager for an alliance, agreed to marry his daughter and heir presumptive to Philip.

The marriage took place on 19 June 1369 in Ghent, and from then Philip was closely associated to the reign of his father-in-law, helping him to crush the Flemish at the Battle of Roosebeke. Louis of Flanders died soon after, on 30 January 1384: Philip became Count consort of Flanders, Artois, Rethel, Nevers and Burgundy. Peace was officially restored in Flanders by the Peace of Tournai in 1385. Also in 1385, the offices of Chancellor of Burgundy and of Chancellor of Flanders were merged, and in 1386 two Chambers of Accounts were created: the first one in Lille for his northern possessions, the other one in Dijon for his southern possessions. These were the first step in the centralization of power.

Philip carried out an ambitious matrimonial policy that turned to the east: his first son John married Margaret of Bavaria, and his daughters Margaret and Catherine of Burgundy married, respectively, William, Count of Hainaut, Holland and Zeeland, and Leopold IV, Duke of Austria. His last son Anthony married Jeanne of Saint-Pol, daughter of Waleran III of Luxembourg.

=== From French vassals to rivals of the Valois Kings ===
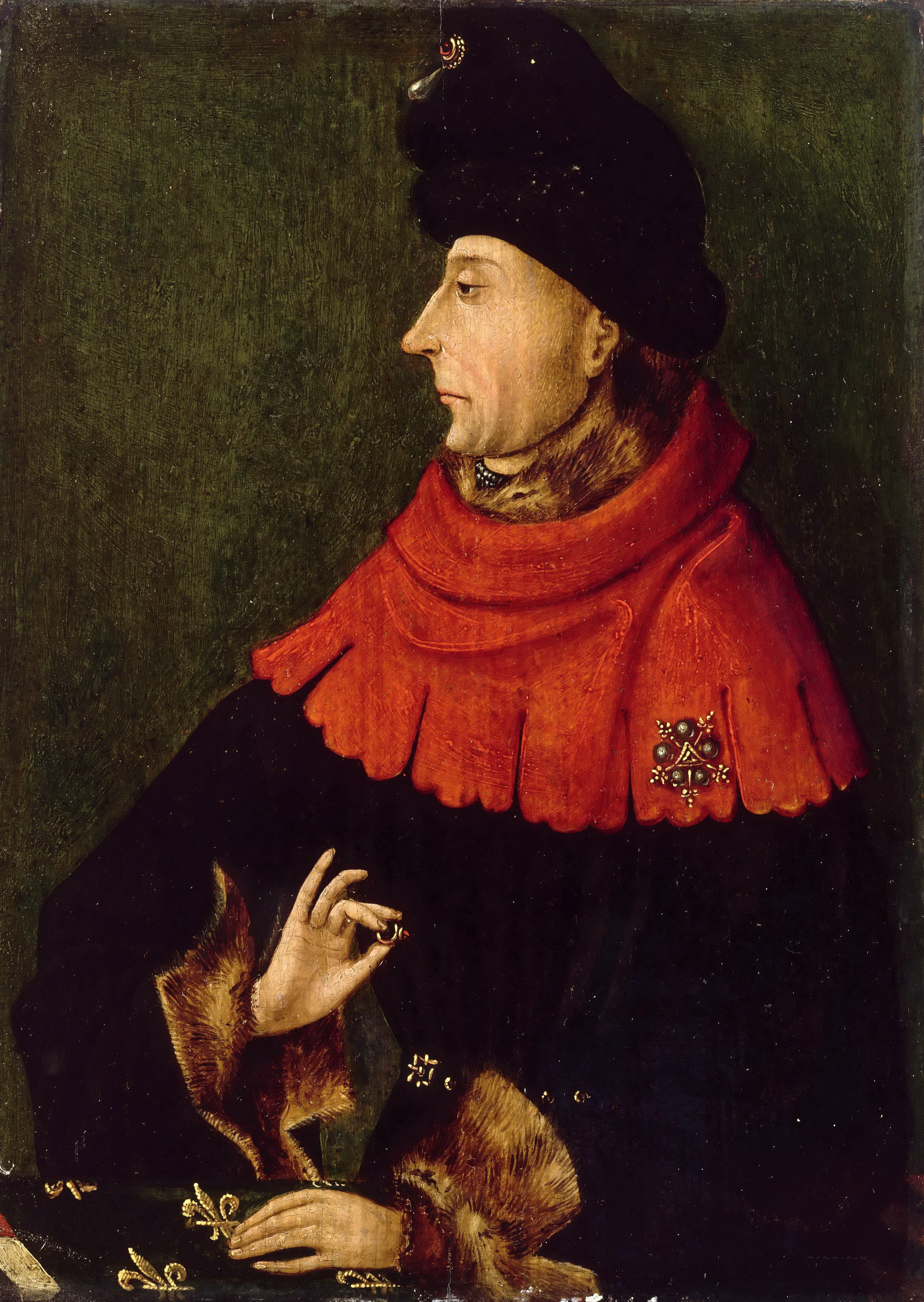
Portrait of Duke John the Fearless, after Jean Malouel

During the reigns of Philip the Bold and his son John the Fearless, loyalty to the king of France remained strong, and serving the kingdom was a significant duty. During the minority of his nephew, King Charles VI, Philip took part in the "government of the uncles": he was regent alongside his brothers Louis I, Duke of Anjou, and John, Duke of Berry, and Louis II, Duke of Bourbon. Charles VI took power for himself in 1388, aged 19, only to give it back four years later, when he showed his first signs of madness. From then, the King was considered mad and the Duke of Burgundy effectively had power, although Louis I, Duke of Orléans, gained more and more power and Philip's influence diminished.

Philip died in 1404 and John the Fearless succeeded him. His main goal was to regain power over the regency by excluding Louis of Orléans. Louis was very unpopular: he wanted to resume war with the English and was rumoured to have had an affair with Queen Isabeau. Both men were constantly hampering each other, until John finally decided to kill his enemy. Louis of Orléans was murdered on 23 November 1407 in the streets of Paris. It was the beginning of the Armagnac–Burgundian Civil War. The Duke of Burgundy was in power until 1413, when the Armagnacs took Paris. When Henry V of England resumed the war, John of Burgundy remained neutral and avoided the French defeat at Agincourt. He took Paris back in 1418 and had control over the King, but Charles, the Dauphin of France, an Armagnac partisan, escaped. He later took the lead of the Armagnac party. In 1419, parleys took place: the Armagnac and the Burgundian parties were close to find peace at last, but on 10 September 1419, during a parley between the Duke and the Dauphin on the bridge at Montereau, John the Fearless was murdered in turn.

Seeking revenge, the new 23-year-old duke of Burgundy, Philip, later known as Philip the Good, agreed to ally with the English. As regent, he made King Charles sign the Treaty of Troyes, which disinherited his son in favor of Henry V of England, who was to marry Catherine of Valois, uniting the Houses of France and England. But Henry died in August 1422, followed two months later by Charles. Henry VI, King of France and England, was just a baby, and the regency was assumed by John, Duke of Bedford. The Anglo-Burgundian alliance won many major victories, and controlled a large part of France. However, Joan of Arc came and changed the course of the war, allowing Charles VII of France to be crowned in Reims on July 1429. Joan of Arc was later captured by the Burgundians and handed over to the English.

In 1435, the Congress of Arras took place and ended in a reconciliation between Burgundy and France. Duke Philip the Good recognized Charles VII as King of France, and Charles recognized the Burgundian territorial acquisitions. Philip was personally exempted from pledging homage to the King.

=== Territorial expansion ===
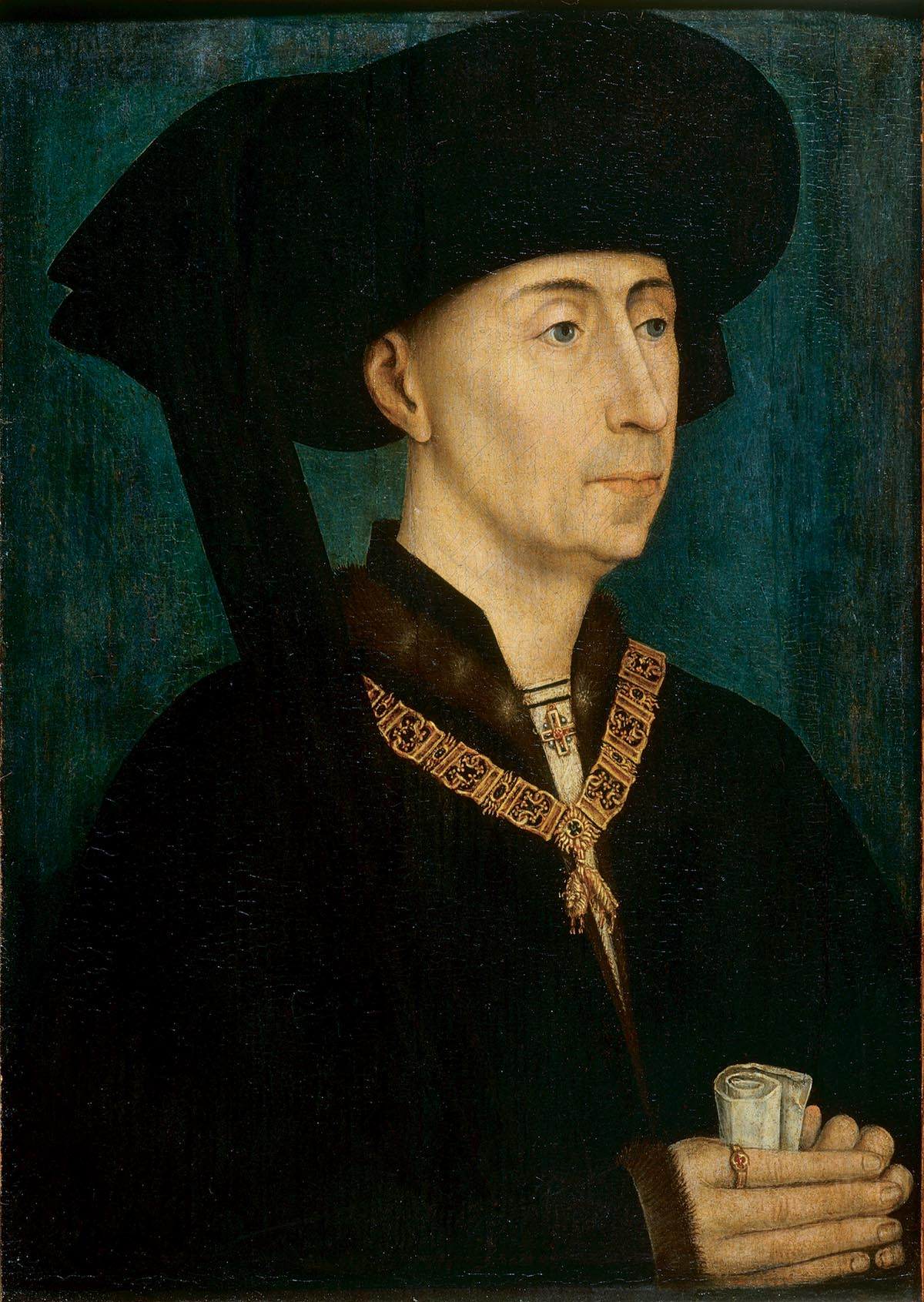
Portrait of Duke Philip the Good, after Rogier van der Weyden

After 1435, Philip the Good was no longer interested in the French affairs, and ruled his own territories as their sovereign.

Philip managed to considerably expand the Burgundian State in the Low Countries. In 1421, he bought the County of Namur from the impoverished Marquis of Namur, inheriting it outright in 1429. In 1430, he inherited the Margraviate of Antwerp and the Duchies of Brabant, Limburg and Luxembourg, succeeding his cousin Philip, son of Anthony of Burgundy. He also took advantage of a succession crisis to make himself the heir of Jacqueline of Hainaut — at the time of her death, in 1433, he seized her Counties of Hainaut, Holland and Zeeland. Finally, in 1441 he bought from his aunt Elizabeth of Görlitz the Duchy of Luxembourg. The Low Countries were at last united, becoming the Burgundian Netherlands.

Under his rule, the court of Burgundy found its apex. A great patron, he made it a major artistic center. Burgundian celebrations and banquets enjoyed an international reputation. Philip himself was a renowned prince within Christendom, especially for his repeated calls for a Crusade against the Ottoman Empire, such as during the Feast of the Pheasant. In 1430, he created the prestigious Order of the Golden Fleece.

However, the growing centralisation of power under the House of Burgundy did not please the Flemish cities, proud of their autonomy and liberties. Duke Philip had to suppress the Bruges Rebellion of 1436–1438, and then the Revolt of Ghent of 1449–1453. Both times, Burgundian forces were able to count on the support of the other Flemish towns. After those two events, urban liberties were severely compromised, and Burgundian domination only increased.

More opposition came in the Wars of Liège, a series of three rebellions led by the Principality of Liège, refusing the Burgundian protectorate and Louis de Bourbon, nephew of Philip the Good, as their Prince-Bishop. Three times the rebels were defeated, until Charles the Bold sacked and destroyed the town in 1468.

At the end of Philip's long reign, under the influence of the House of Croÿ, the Duke got closer to King Louis XI of France, whom he hosted when he was opposed to his father. Louis bought back the towns of Picardy, which displeased Charles, count of Charolais, the Duke's son and heir. He joined a noble revolt against the King, the League of the Public Weal, whereupon the King returned the towns to Burgundy.

=== The dream of a revived Burgundian kingdom ===
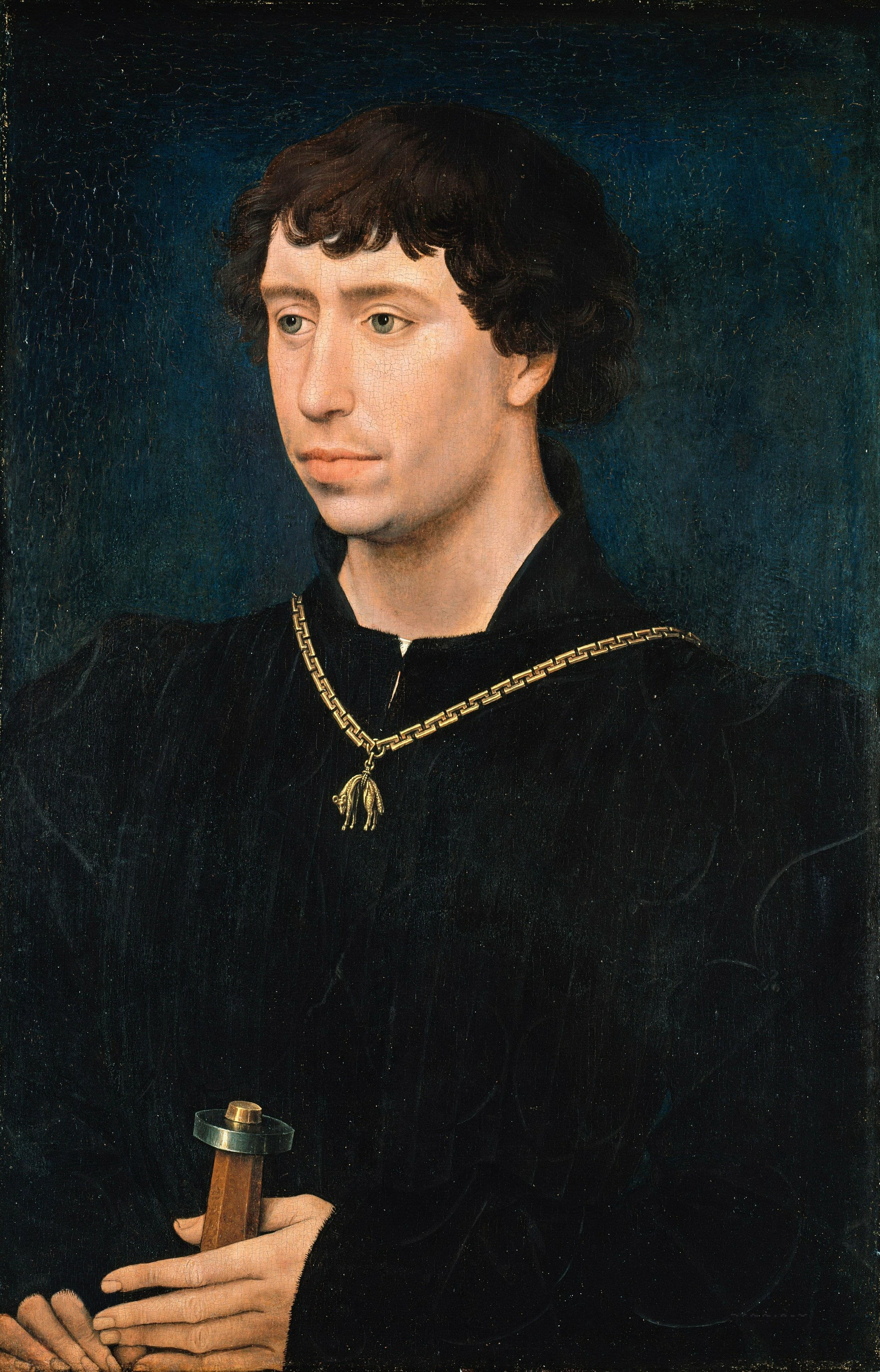
Portrait of Duke Charles the Bold by Rogier van der Weyden

Philip the Good nurtured the ambition to elevate the Burgundian State to the status of a sovereign kingdom within the framework of the Holy Roman Empire, which included a nominal Kingdom of Italy and a more substantial Kingdom of Bohemia, and in the past had also incorporated the ancient Kingdom of Burgundy that however had lost any materiality by the late 14th century. Philip viewed Burgundian kingship as a long-term aim which needed careful preparation. In 1447, he held talks to that effect with Holy Roman Emperor Frederick III, but the latter only proposed kingship on behalf of Brabant or Frisia, both options too narrow to suit Philip's vision. In 1454, Philip traveled to Regensburg with intent to negotiate Burgundy's status, but Frederick did not attend the meeting and no progress was made.

Charles, known as "Charles the Bold", (Note: In France, he is nowadays known as Charles le Téméraire, meaning "Charles the Rash".) succeeded his father Philip the Good in 1467, after having been his lieutenant for two years. An ambitious and ruthless character, he wished to rule over a territorially continuous and independent kingdom, reminiscent of the old Lotharingia, but also of the Kingdoms of Burgundy and of Gallia Belgica.

By the Treaty of Péronne of October 1468, Louis XI of France withdrew the French lands of the Duke of Burgundy from the jurisdiction of the Parlement of Paris. But he later opposed this agreement, and declared war on the duke in December 1470. According to the noncompliance clause of the treaty, Duke Charles declared himself and his lands forever freed of the French crown.

In the same time, he encouraged a resumption of the Hundred Years' War. He supported King Edward IV of York, marrying his sister, and had him land in Calais in the summer of 1475. Presenting himself without a whole army, he failed to convince Edward, who had to deal with the King of France, resulting in the Treaty of Picquigny.

Charles also got closer to the Holy Roman Emperor Frederick III of Habsburg. In November 1473, the two met at Trier and negotiated the marriage of Charles's daughter Marie to Frederick's son Maximilian. During that encounter, Frederick considered having Charles elected as King of the Romans and the next Emperor, then pivoted to reviving the Kingdom of Burgundy, which would have included all Burgundian State's lands within the Empire plus the Duchies of Lorraine, Savoy and Clèves and the Bishoprics of Utrecht, Liège, Toul and Verdun. The date of 25 November 1473 was set for Charles' coronation, and a crown and scepter were prepared. The Emperor, however, abruptly ended the negotiations by fleeing by night with his son.

Charles continued to expand the Burgundian State by buying Brisgau and Sundgau from Sigismund, Archduke of Austria in 1469, then conquering the Duchy of Guelders and the County of Zutphen. Finally, in 1475, he conquered the Duchy of Lorraine, ruling at last over a vast continuous territory going from Charolais to Friesland. He proclaimed his wish to make the Lorrainer city of Nancy the capital of his kingdom.

Charles was obsessed with kingship, which could have given his lands the unity they lacked. He always dressed very richly, and, faced with the King of France or the Emperor, presented himself as their equal. He made himself a golden hat, of which an Italian observer of the time said that "it seemed like a king's crown".

Valois Burgundy's territorial appetite frightened the Swiss Confederacy, leading to the Burgundian Wars (1474–1477). Charles the Bold's armies suffered two large defeats in 1476, at Grandson and Morat. The Duke of Lorraine took advantage of that and took Nancy back. With a weakened army, Duke Charles persevered and wanted to besiege Nancy as quickly as possible. The union of the Swiss and Lorrainer armies defeated the Burgundians during the battle of 5 January 1477, in which Charles the Bold was killed.

=== The House of Burgundy-Habsburg ===
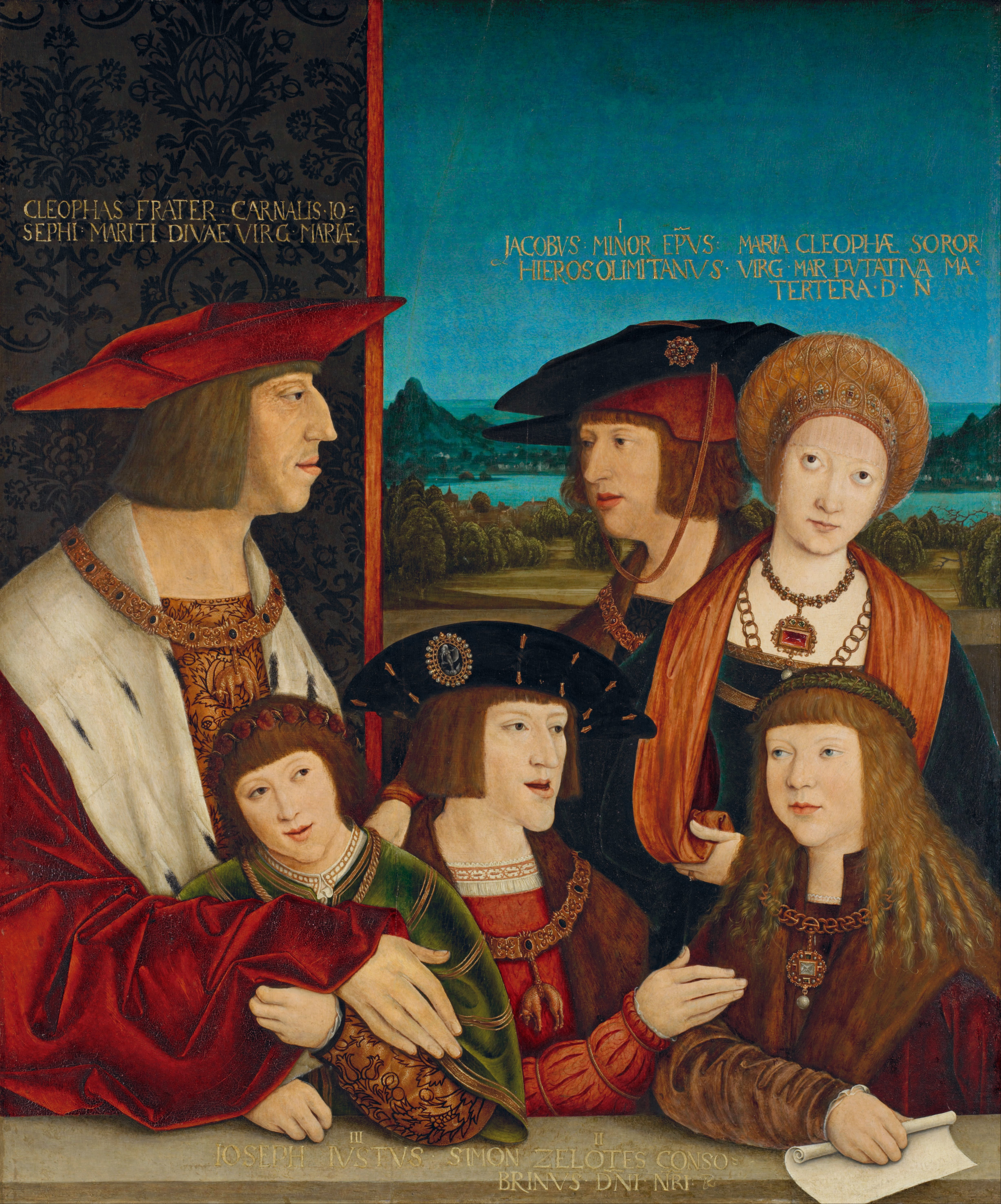
Maximilian of Austria and Mary of Burgundy with their son Philip the Handsome and his sons Ferdinand I and Charles V and his son-in-law Louis II of Hungary, by Bernhard Strigel

After Charles's death, Louis XI didn't wait long to invade Burgundy, Artois and Flanders. To protect herself, Mary, Charles's sole heir, summoned the States General of the Netherlands. Unhappy with the previous duke's actions, she had to grant them the Great Privilege, which suppressed several centralized institutions, reestablished many local and communal rights, and increased the power of the States General. They encouraged her to marry Maximilian of Austria. The marriage eventually took place in Ghent on 19 August 1477. The coming of Maximilian as duke cheered the troops, and turned the tables on the King of France who had been taking advantage of the death of his opponent. The French were defeated at the Battle of Guinegate (1479), after which they negotiated a truce. However, the unexpected death of Mary in 1482, from a horse riding accident, weakened Maximilian's position, as he had to cope with difficulties being accepted as the rightful regent for his son Philip, aged three.

The Treaty of Arras, signed on December 1482, planned to marry Mary and Maximilian's daughter, Margaret, to the Dauphin Charles, aged 12. The Burgundy-Habsburgs kept Flanders (and the rest of the Netherlands, which were imperial estates), while France won the Duchy of Burgundy, Artois and Picardy, and soon the County of Burgundy as the dowry of Margaret. But the Dauphin, after having been crowned as Charles VIII, instead married Anne of Brittany, who was already married by proxy to Maximilian. By the Treaty of Senlis of 1493, the French king gave back Artois, Charolais and the County of Burgundy. Later, by the Treaty of Cambrai of 1529, King Francis I of France definitively gave up French sovereignty over Artois and Flanders; in return, Emperor Charles V gave up on his claim to the Duchy of Burgundy.

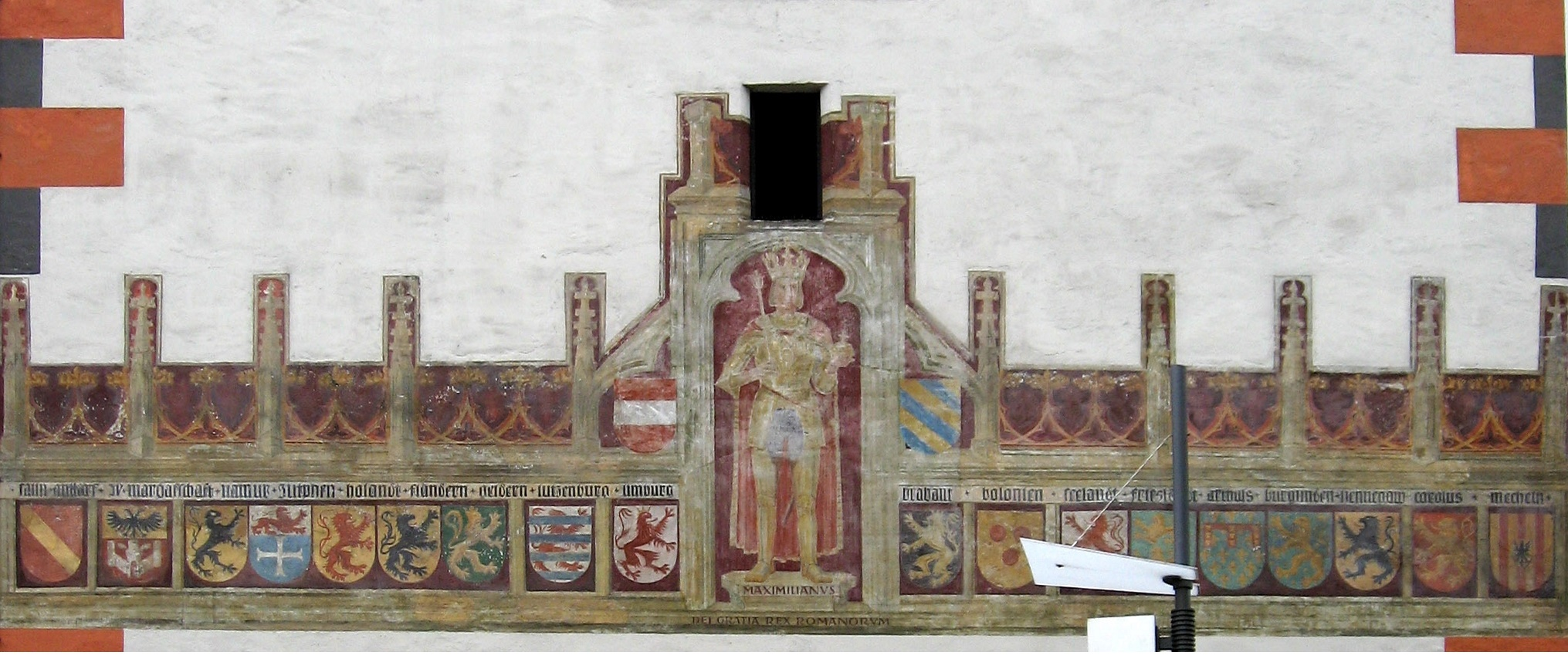
Maximilian I as King of the Romans, surrounded by the coat of arms of the Burgundian provinces, wall fresco at the Vöcklabruck City Tower, 1502

In 1512, the Burgundian Circle was created as an Imperial Circle of the Holy Roman Empire, bringing together Franche-Comté and the Habsburg Netherlands. During the Guelders Wars, the following territories were added to the Burgundian states: Friesland, and Frisia, Utrecht, Overijssel, Groningen, the County of Zutphen, and the Duchy of Guelders. In 1549, Charles V issued the Pragmatic Sanction and organized the Burgundian Low Countries in Seventeen Provinces. Following the Dutch Revolt, those territories were divided between the Spanish Netherlands and the United Provinces. Franche-Comté was ceded by Spain to France in the Treaty of Nijmegen (1678). Following the War of the Spanish Succession, the Habsburg Netherlands passed to Austria and remained in Austrian hands until the French conquest of the late 18th century. Following the Congress of Vienna, the former Burgundian territories remaining divided between France, the Netherlands and, following the Belgian Revolution, modern-day Belgium. Noble houses of the mid-sixteenth-century Habsburg Netherlands

== Institutions ==
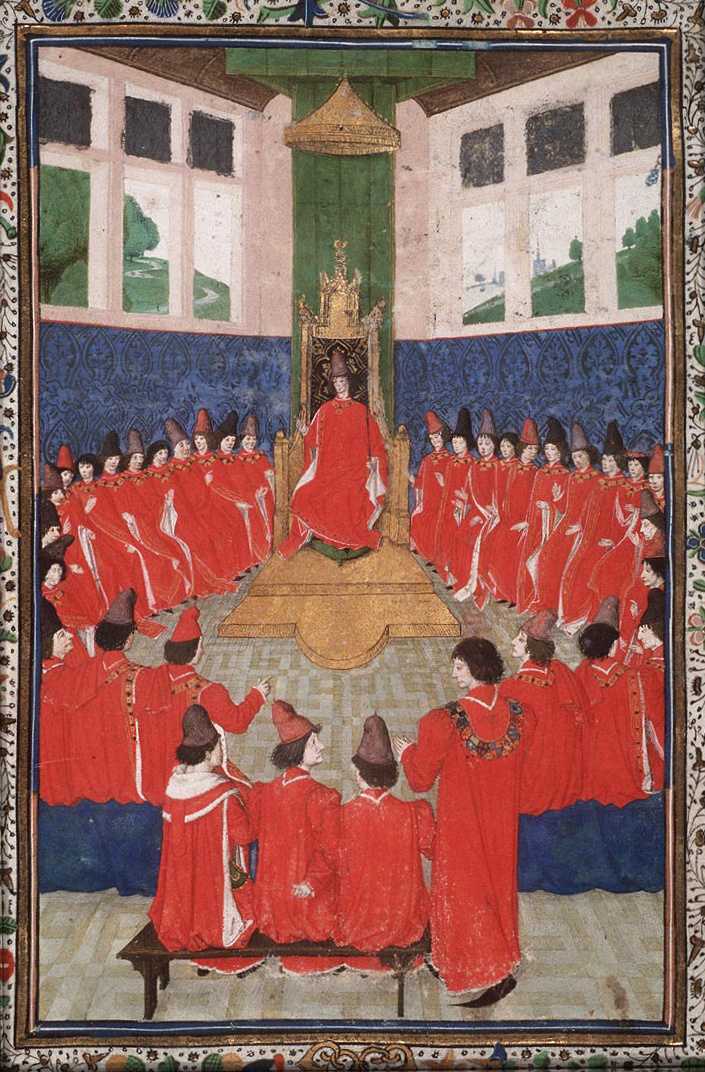
Chapter of the Order of the Golden Fleece presided over by Charles the Bold in Valenciennes, 1473

=== The Court ===
The Court of Burgundy was itinerant. There was no such thing as a capital, although some towns could have claimed it. Dijon was the traditional capital of the Dukes of Burgundy, and it was there Philip the Bold founded the Palace of the Dukes and the Chartreuse of Champmol, which was meant to be a burial place for the dynasty. But Philip the Good and his successors preferred to stay in the Netherlands, in towns such as Brussels, Ghent, Bruges, Lille, Arras and Hesdin.

Around the Duke was his hôtel, the household having in charge the daily life of the Court, following the French model.

The wealthy Court of Burgundy displayed unprecedented splendor, culminating in the sumptuous wedding of Charles the Bold and Margaret of York, "the wedding of the century", still celebrated in Bruges nowadays every five years.

Another time for celebrations were the chapters of the Order of the Golden Fleece, where members of the order reunited. The order, which promoted chivalry and Christianity, was very influential in Europe.

The Burgundian Court was also a major artistic center. The illustrated manuscripts of the dukes were well-renowned; their illuminators included Jean Miélot, Willem Vrelant, Loyset Liédet and Lieven van Lathem. Early Netherlandish painting appeared largely thanks to the patronage of the duke of Burgundy: among the most famous of those "Flemish primitives" were Robert Campin, Jan van Eyck, Rogier van der Weyden and Petrus Christus. In music, members of the Burgundian School were leading composers of mid-15th century Europe, amongst them musicians Guillaume Du Fay, Gilles Binchois and Antoine Busnois.

=== Politics ===
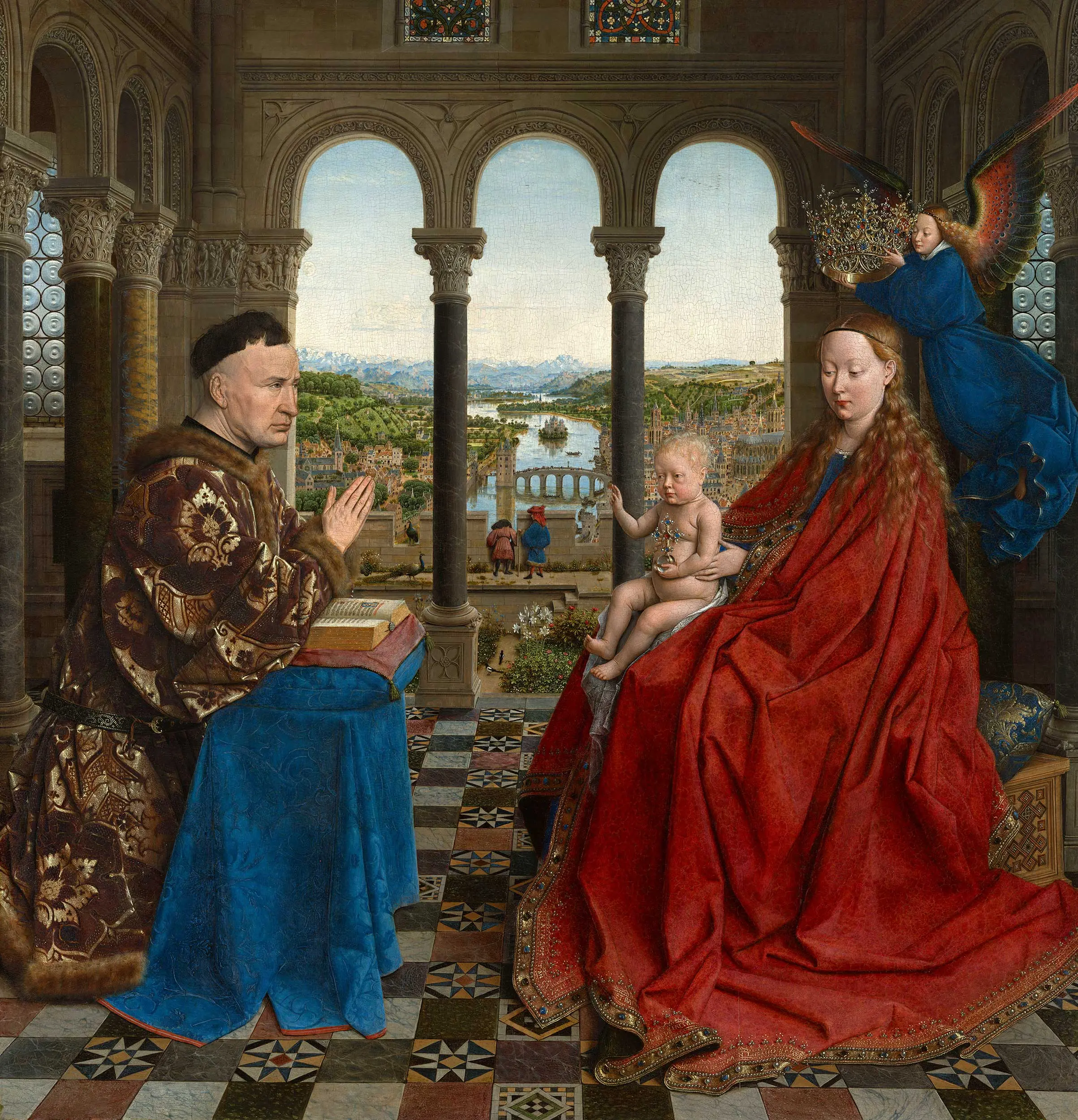
Jan van Eyck, The Virgin of Chancellor Rolin, c. 1435

Burgundian territories were roughly divided into two parts: Burgundy (Duchy and County) to the South; and the Netherlands to the North. The States General of the Netherlands were summoned for the first time on 9 January 1464 in Bruges, with representatives of the three estates from 16 or 17 provinces – giving its name to the Seventeen Provinces.

One institution was gaining power: the Chancery. The chancellor of Burgundy acquired during this time a political role, becoming something of a chief minister for the dukes. Nicolas Rolin was a well-known figure, a recognized patron and the right-hand man of Philip the Good for more than forty years. Guillaume Hugonet succeeded him, and was a spokesman for Charles the Bold: he would always express the Duke's political views (of himself as an absolute ruler) by addressing the towns or the States General.

=== Noble houses of the mid-sixteenth-century & power structure ===
Aristocratic wealth and political power in the Habsburg Netherlands of the 1520s–1560s were concentrated among a small number of interlinked noble houses. The House of Croÿ was, for much of the century's first half, considered the foremost family in the Low Countries, and was raised to the Dukedom of Aarschot in 1533, the only Netherlandish duchy outside Habsburg hands. The House of Nassau, through its Breda branch, rivaled and eventually surpassed Croÿ in influence: Henry III of Nassau-Breda succeeded Croÿ's Guillaume de Chièvres as Charles V's Upper Chamberlain in 1521 and served as stadtholder of Holland and Zeeland, while the barony of Breda remained by far the family's most important landholding in the Low Countries and a major source of its income. His son René of Chalon and his cousin William of Orange both succeeded as sovereign princes of Orange putting them somewhat above all the other nobles. They were also counselors of the Habsburgs and generals.

The House of Egmont, descended from the former sovereign Dukes of Guelders, was counted among the wealthiest and most powerful families of the Low Countries, with Lamoral, Count of Egmont, becoming stadtholder of Flanders and Artois after his victories at Saint-Quentin and Gravelines. A second tier of comparably prominent, closely intermarried houses included the Lalaing family, Counts of Hoogstraten, who accumulated successive stadtholderships of Holland-Zeeland-West Friesland, Guelders, and Jülich across three generations, and the Glymes family, Marquises of Bergen op Zoom. The Van Brederode family, seated at Vianen since 1418 as one of the most ancient Dutch noble houses, supplied political leadership to the opposition through Hendrik van Brederode, who led the 1566 Compromise of Nobles delegation from which the rebel epithet "Geuzen" derived.

=== Military ===
The Burgundian army assembled soldiers from all the provinces. It relied on feudal duties, until Charles the Bold decided to modernize it by creating compagnies d'ordonnance, i.e. a regular army, based on the French model.

=== Justice ===
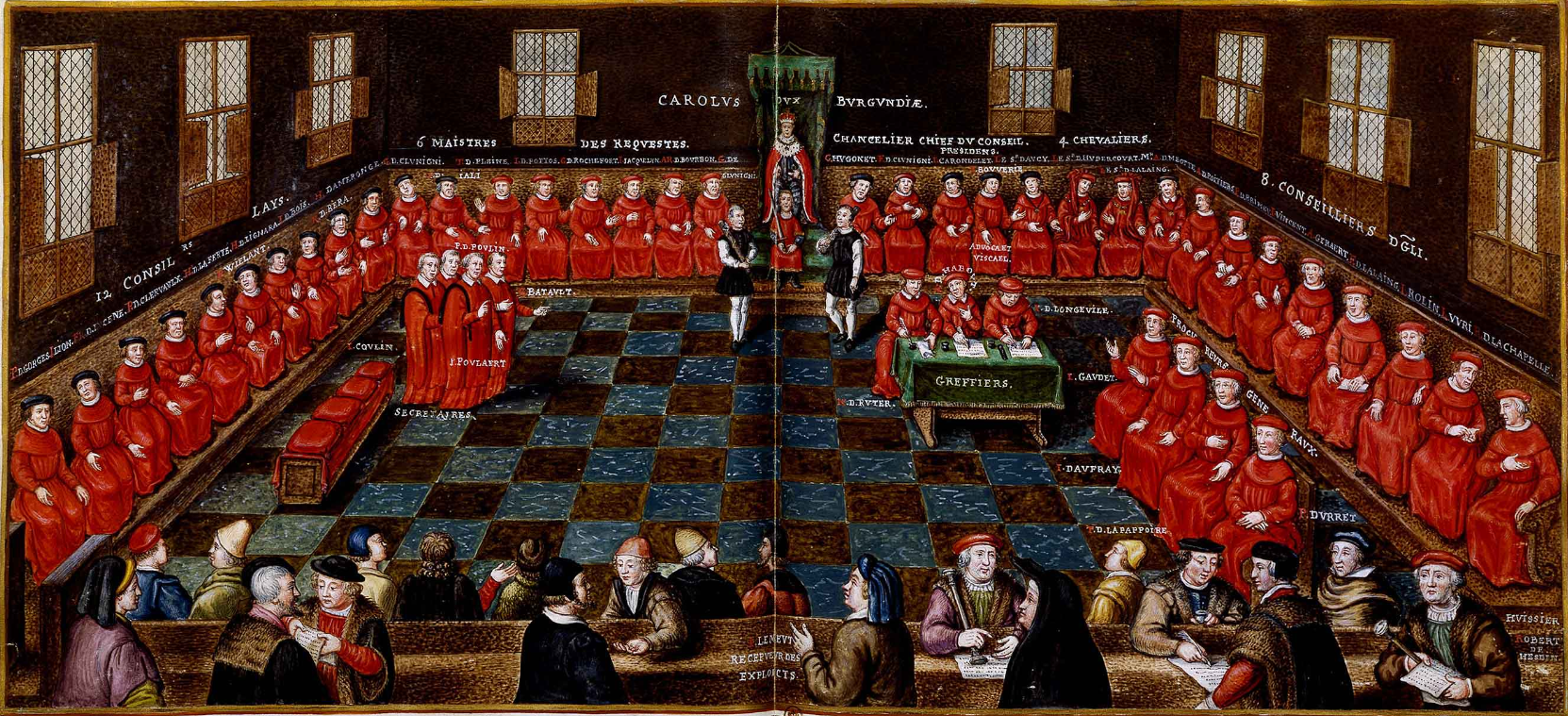
Session of the Parliament of Mechelen presided over by Charles the Bold. 17th century drawing after a 15th-century original

Philip the Bold created the first version of the Parliament in Beaune. Around the itinerant duke was a judicial Grand Conseil, also itinerant, and under the jurisdiction of the Parlement of Paris until 1471.

In December 1473, Charles the Bold created a new Parliament in Mechelen, being a sovereign court receiving appeals from subjects from all the Burgundian Netherlands. It was abolished by his successor Mary's compromise with the states, the Great Privilege of 1477, only to be reestablished by her son Philip the Handsome as the "Great Council of Mechelen".

=== Financial system ===
The Chambres des Comptes (Chambers of Accounts) were major elements of the centralization of power and of the modern financial system set up by the dukes. Philip the Bold created Chambers in Lille and Dijon; Philip the Good created two more in Brussels and The Hague. Charles the Bold created in 1474 a unique Chamber for the Burgundian Netherlands—in Mechelen, as was the newly sat Parliament. Mechelen became the capital of the Northern Burgundian administration. The city had the benefit of being an independent lordship, so neither Flanders, Brabant or Holland would be privileged by this choice.

The taxes were indirect. The towns refused direct taxes, but nonetheless the taxes only increased and were becoming more and more direct. Under Charles the Bold, the military campaigns were expensive and military aids were often demanded, until 1475 and the granting of an aid of 500,000 crowns by the States General of the Netherlands.

== Symbols of Valois Burgundy ==
A wooden Cross of Burgundy with firesteel, sparks and the Golden Fleece

- The arms of the duke were the arms of Burgundy quartered with Philip the Bold's old arms of Touraine. John the Fearless added the arms of Flanders; Philip the Good those of Brabant and Limburg.
- John the Fearless chose a plane (rabot) as his personal emblem.
- In John's war against the Armagnacs, he also chose to display a Cross of St. Andrew, meaning a diagonal cross, often red. Later it would be made of two wooden branches, making it a saw-toothed cross, the Cross of Burgundy.
- A firesteel (showing the letter B) was also one of the Burgundian symbols, often represented alongside sparks.
- The Golden Fleece was often shown as well, especially the whole collar of the Order's members, in heraldry.

== The dynasty ==
| Picture | Name | Birth | Reign | Notes | Arms |
|---|---|---|---|---|---|
| | John II of France (Jean II le Bon) (Jan II de Goede) | 26 April 1319 | 28 December 1361 – 6 September 1363 | First son of King Philip VI of France from the House of Valois and his wife Joan of Burgundy. Married Duchess Bonne of Luxembourg in 1332. | |
| | Philip the Bold (Philippe le Hardi) (Filips de Stoute) | 15 January 1342 | 6 September 1363 – 27 April 1404 | Younger son of John II of France. Appointed duke of Burgundy in 1363. Married Margaret of Flanders in 1369. | |
| | John the Fearless (Jean sans Peur) (Jan zonder Vrees) | 28 May 1371 | 27 April 1404 – 10 September 1419 | Eldest son of Philip the Bold. Murdered at Montereau in 1419. | |
| | Philip the Good (Philippe le Bon) (Filips de Goede) | 31 July 1396 | 10 September 1419 – 15 June 1467 | Eldest son of John the Fearless. | |
| | Charles the Bold (Charles le Téméraire) (Karel de Stoute) | 21 November 1433 | 15 June 1467 – 5 January 1477 | Only legitimate surviving son of Philip the Good. Killed at the battle of Nancy, leading to the War of the Burgundian Succession. | |
| | Mary of Burgundy (Marie de Bourgogne) (Maria van Bourgondië) | 13 February 1457 | 5 January 1477 – 27 March 1482 | Only child of Charles the Bold. Married Maximilian of Austria in 1477. | |
| | Philip the Handsome (Philippe le Beau) (Filips de Schone) | 22 July 1478 | 27 March 1482 – 25 September 1506 | Eldest son of Duchess Mary. His father Maximilian is regent until 1494 (the regency is disputed in Flanders). Married Joanna of Castille in 1496 and became King consort of Castille. | |
| | Charles V (Charles Quint) (Karel V) | 24 February 1500 | 25 September 1506 – 25 October 1555 | Eldest son of Philip the Handsome. His aunt Margaret is regent until 1515, by Emperor Maximilian's will. Elected Emperor of the Romans in 1519. Became King of Germany, of Spain and of Italy. | |
| | Philip II (Philip the Prudent) (Spanish: Felipe el Prudente) | 21 May 1527 | 6 January 1556 – 13 September 1598 | Eldest son of Charles V. Under his reign the Spanish Golden Age occurred. But, the Netherlands revolted and under William of Orange the northern half ultimately gained its independence as the Dutch Republic. | |

== Bibliography ==
- Lecuppre-Desjardin, Élodie (2016). Le Royaume inachevé des ducs de Bourgogne (XIVe–XVe siècles). Paris: Belin. ISBN 978-2-7011-9666-4.
- Van Loo, Bart (2021). The Burgundians: A Vanished Empire. Bloomsbury Publishing. ISBN 978-1-7895-4343-8.
- Pirenne, Henri (1909). "The Formation and Constitution of the Burgundian State (Fifteenth and Sixteenth Centuries)". American Historical Review. 14 (3): 477–502. doi:10.1086/ahr/14.3.477. hdl:2013/ULB-DIPOT:oai:dipot.ulb.ac.be:2013/391496. JSTOR 1836443.
- Schnerb, Bertrand (1999). L'État bourguignon 1363–1477. Paris: Perrin. ISBN 2-262-01126-5.
- Stein, Robert (2017). Magnanimous Dukes and Rising States: The Unification of the Burgundian Netherlands, 1380–1480. Oxford: Oxford University Press. ISBN 978-0198757108.
- Vaughan, Richard (1975). Valois Burgundy. London: Allen Lane. ISBN 0-7139-0924-2.
- Vaughan, Richard (2002a) [1962]. Philip the Bold: The Formation of the Burgundian State (new ed.). Woodbridge: Boydell Press. ISBN 0-85115-915-X.
- Vaughan, Richard (2002b) [1966]. John the Fearless: The Growth of Burgundian Power (new ed.). Woodbridge: Boydell Press. ISBN 0-85115-916-8.
- Vaughan, Richard (2002c) [1970]. Philip the Good: The Apogee of Burgundy (new ed.). Woodbridge: Boydell Press. ISBN 0-85115-917-6.
- Vaughan, Richard (2002d) [1973]. Charles the Bold: The Last Valois Duke of Burgundy (new ed.). Woodbridge: Boydell Press. ISBN 0-85115-918-4.
