= Philip of Saint-Pol =

Philip
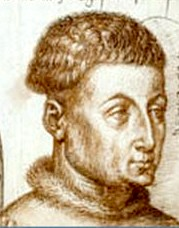
- Early 17th century portrait by Antoine de Succa

Count of Ligny and Saint-Pol
- Reign: 25 October 1415 – 4 August 1430
- Predecessor: Waleran III
- Successor: Joan

Duke of Brabant, Lothier and Limburg
- Reign: 1427 – 4 August 1430
- Predecessor: John IV
- Successor: Philip III
- Born: 25 July 1404
- Died: 4 August 1430 (aged 26); Leuven
- Burial: Saint John the Evangelist Church, Tervuren
- Spouse: Yolande of Anjou
- House: House of Valois-Burgundy
- Father: Anthony of Brabant
- Mother: Joan of Saint-Pol

Philip of Saint-Pol (25 July 1404 – Leuven, 4 August 1430) was the younger son of Duke Anthony of Brabant and Joan of Saint-Pol. He succeeded his brother John IV as duke of Brabant in 1427, while he had inherited Saint-Pol and Ligny as an appanage on the death of his maternal grandfather, Waleran III of Luxembourg, Count of Ligny, in 1415.

He commanded the Burgundian forces occupying Paris in 1419, but he returned to Brabant in 1420, where the populace complained of his brother's misadministration. He was then declared ruwaard (regent) of Brabant. In 1421, he was reconciled with his brother and resigned the regency. The citizens were pacified by John's "Nieuw Regiment" in 1422.

During his own reign, Philip was forced to grant concessions to the nobility in 1428. Wary of the rise of his cousin and heir Philip the Good in the Hook and Cod wars, he sought a marital alliance with Louis II, Duke of Anjou, against Burgundy, marrying his daughter Yolande of Anjou.

Because this marriage produced no children, his death in 1430 placed Brabant in the hands of his cousin Philip the Good, the next heir, whilst Saint-Pol and Ligny went to his great-aunt, Joan of Luxembourg, by proximity of blood. His wife Yolande was placed in the guardianship of Philip the Good, until she remarried in 1431 to Francis I, Duke of Brittany.

== Sources ==
- Blockmans, Willem Pieter; Prevenier, Walter (1999). Peters, Edward (ed.). The Promised Lands: The Low Countries Under Burgundian Rule, 1369-1530. Translated by Fackelman, Elizabeth. University of Pennsylvania Press.
- Rohr, Zita Eva (2016). Yolande of Aragon (1381-1442) Family and Power: The Reverse of the Tapestry. Palgrave Macmillan.
- de Wavrin, Jean (2012). Hardy, William (ed.). Recueil Des Chroniques Et Anchiennes Istories de la Grant Bretaigne, Á Present Nommé Engleterre. Cambridge University Press.

Philip of Saint-Pol House of Valois-Burgundy Born: 25 July 1404 Died: 14 August 1430
Preceded by Waleran III	Count of Saint Pol and Ligny; 1415–1430	Succeeded by Joan
Preceded by John IV	Duke of Brabant, Lothier, and Limburg; 1427–1430	Succeeded by Philip the Good
