= John of Burgundy =

John of Burgundy may refer to:

- John of Burgundy (1231–1268), Count of Charolais and Lord of Bourbon
- John I of Viennois, member of the House of Burgundy, and Dauphin of Viennois
- John the Fearless, Duke of Burgundy, from 1404–1419
- John of Burgundy (bishop of Cambrai) (1404–1479), Archbishop of Trier
