= The Burgundians (book) =

2019 history book by Bart Van Loo

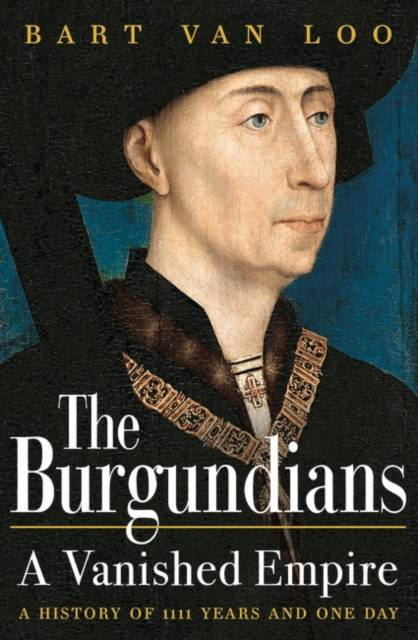
- Cover of the English-language edition, featuring a portrait painting of Philip the Good by Rogier van der Weyden
- Author: Bart Van Loo
- Translator: Nancy Forest-Flier
- Language: Dutch
- Subject: Burgundian State
- Genre: History
- Publisher: De Bezige Bij
- Publication date: 2019
- English publication date: 2021
- ISBN: 9789403139005

The Burgundians: A Vanished Empire (Dutch: De Bourgondiërs: Aartsvaders van de Lage Landen, lit. 'The Burgundians: Patriarchs of the Low Countries') is a Dutch-language history book written by Belgian author Bart Van Loo and published in 2019, later republished in English in 2021. It received mostly positive reviews from critics and was ranked in the De Bestseller 60 list.

== Background ==
The book was written by Bart Van Loo, a Belgian author and entertainer, and published in the original Dutch in 2019 by De Bezige Bij. The English translation of the book was published in 2021, translated by Nancy Forest-Flier.

== Synopsis ==
The Burgundians chronicles the history of the rise and fall of the Valois-Burgundy dynasty, starting with its founder Philip the Bold and ending with Charles the Bold. The book describes the dynasty's political intrigue, military campaigns, marriages and alliances, and the cultural and artistic bloom which they encouraged in the Burgundian State that stretched to parts of what is now France, Belgium, the Netherlands, Luxembourg, Germany, and Switzerland. During the course of the book, Van Loo highlights the lives of various prominent figures of the medieval Low Countries, such as Philip the Good, John the Fearless, Mary of Burgundy, and Charles the Bold. He provides historical facts together with anecdotes and personal stories.

== Reception ==
=== Critical ===
Reception

Review scores
Publication	Score
De Standaard	4/5 stars
The Daily Telegraph	5/5 stars

The book was generally praised by critics. Tim Smith-Lang of The Daily Telegraph said that "it works, and shines a very welcome spotlight on a dynasty that, in Britain at least, is sadly neglected outside of specialist circles." Justine Firnhaber-Baker of History Today criticized the book for its references but concluded that the book was "a richly flavoured story of the later Middle Ages' most magnificent dynasty." Paul Lay and Dominic Sandbrook of The Times respectively called the book "entertaining" and "superb," with the book later appearing on The Times list of the best history books of 2021. Historian Hans Cools, in his review, praised the book's various illustrative stories but criticized Van Loo for the overall lack of structure surrounding them.

=== Commercial ===
The book stayed in De Bestseller 60 list of bestselling Dutch-language books in the Netherlands for a total 38 weeks, peaking at third place in the ninth week of 2019.
