= John IV of Brabant =

Duke of Brabant (1403–1427)

John IV, Duke of Brabant
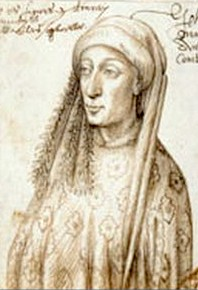
- Early 17th century portrait by Antoine de Succa
- Born: 11 June 1403; Arras
- Died: 17 April 1427 (aged 23); Brussels
- Buried: Saint John the Evangelist Church, Tervuren
- Noble family: Valois
- Spouse: Jacqueline, Countess of Hainaut
- Father: Antoine of Burgundy
- Mother: Jeanne of Saint-Pol

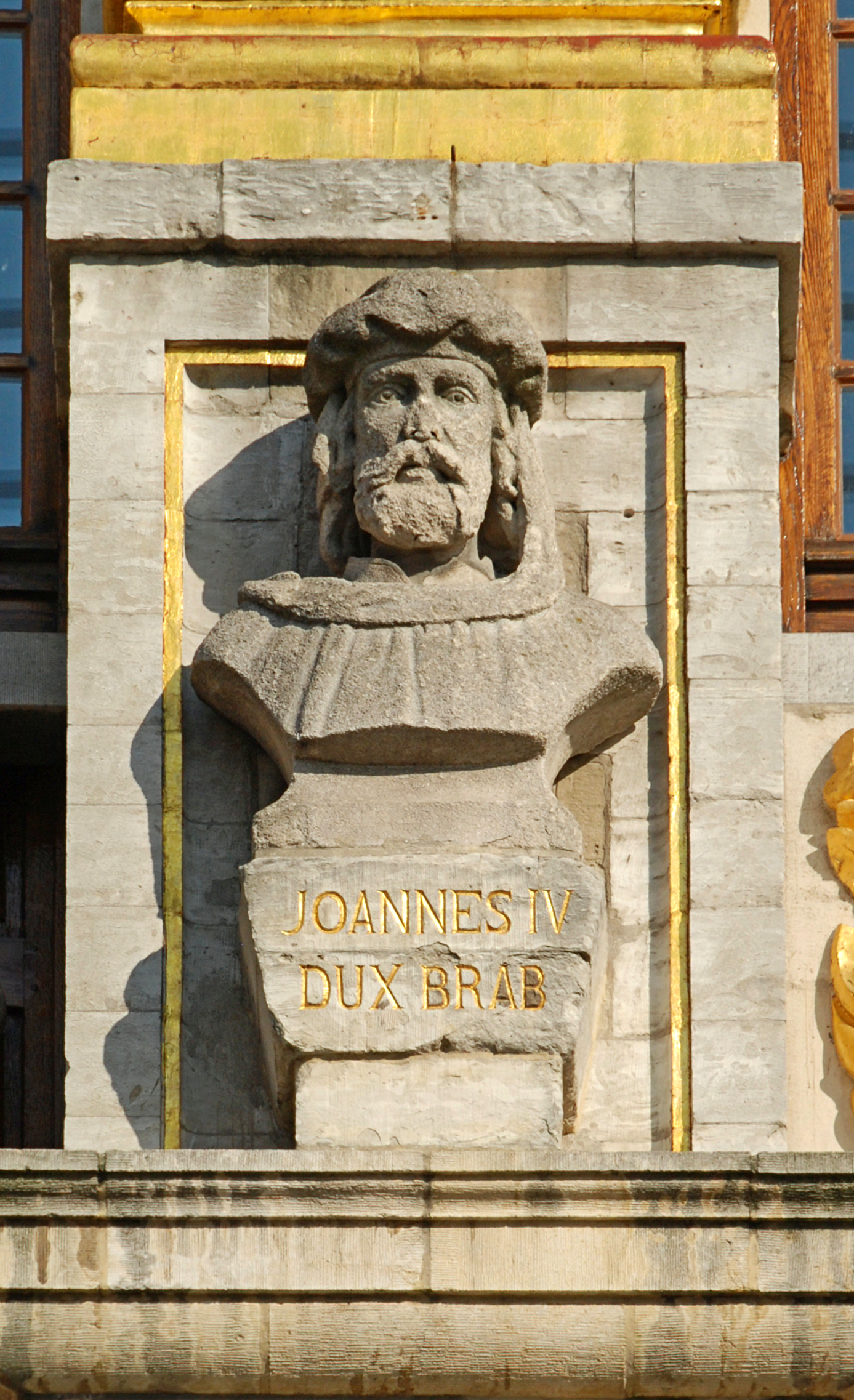
Statue of John IV on the House of the Dukes of Brabant in Brussels.

John IV, Duke of Brabant (11 June 1403 – 17 April 1427) was the son of Antoine of Burgundy, Duke of Brabant, Lothier and Limburg and his first wife Jeanne of Saint-Pol. He was the second Brabantian ruler from the House of Valois. He is best known for founding the University of Louvain (Leuven) in 1425.

== Succession as Duke of Brabant ==
John was born in Arras, and succeeded as duke of Brabant in 1415, after his father's death at the Battle of Agincourt. However, his succession was not immediately accepted by everyone. The holy Roman emperor Sigismund contested his succession, as he wished to curb the Valois influence (read: the influence of the duke of Burgundy, John's uncle) in the region. John the Fearless, the duke of Burgundy, naturally supported his nephew, as did the States of Brabant. Their joint support prevented a second succession war in the duchy. Furthermore, through their support of John as the new duke, the States of Brabant gained regency over the duchy until the coming of age of the still underage duke.

== Marriage to Jacqueline, Countess of Hainaut ==
In 1418, he married Jacqueline, Countess of Hainaut. Jacqueline's supporters hoped that the marriage would provide a protector - in the person of John IV of Brabant - of Jacqueline's inheritance against the claims of her uncle John III. Through their marriage, the counties of Holland, Zeeland and Hainaut and the duchies of Brabant and Limburg were united in a personal union.

However, the marriage did not provide the stability sought after by Jacqueline and her supporters and eventually led to estrangement of the couple in 1420. One of the reasons was his incapability to protect her rights in Holland and Zeeland. His attempts in the first year of their marriage, such as the disastrous Siege of Dordrecht (summer of 1418), were insufficient against the force of Jacqueline's uncle, John III. Another reason why their marriage and John's attempts to defend Jacqueline's rights in Holland and Zeeland did not succeed was that John's closest advisors were all part of the Cod faction, while Jacqueline's supporters were of the Hook faction in the Hook and Cod disputes. This meant an inevitable political struggle. Under influence of his advisors, John appointed Jacqueline's uncle, John III, as regent (Dutch: ruwaard) of Holland in 1420. This open support of her uncle caused Jacqueline to flee her husband's court and declared their marriage annulled.

After the death of John III in 1425, the county of Holland once again fell to John IV. However, he immediately appointed his cousin Philip the Good, duke of Burgundy, as the new regent as well as his heir in case he died without issue.

== Tensions in the Duchy of Brabant ==
Coat of Arms of the Dukes of Brabant of the Burgundy family.

That John's advisors were of the Cod faction did not only cause friction in John's marriage to Jacqueline, but also caused tensions in the Duchy of Brabant. There was a great discontent amongst the cities and the aristocracy who had been powerful under his father's reign against these powerful advisors. When Jacqueline left her husband in 1420, the States of Brabant sided with her. They appointed John's brother, Philip of Saint-Pol, regent of Brabant.

A forceful reaction of the duke against these measures was prevented by the uprising of the Brussels guilds. This meant that, for the time being, John had to bend to their wishes. A reconciliation treaty was made in 1421 and John was restored to his full ducal powers. In return, he expanded the city privileges and the powers of the States of Brabant in 1422, a measure called the Nieuw Regiment. With this reconciliation, the States of Brabant supported their duke in his fight against Jacqueline and her new husband, Humphrey, Duke of Gloucester. He never accepted the annulment of their marriage, and was post-mortem backed up by the pope in 1428.

John died in Brussels in 1427, aged 23, without issue. This meant his claims on Holland, Zeeland and Hainaut, as husband of Jacqueline, were transferred to Philip the Good. His duchies of Brabant and Limburg were inherited by his younger brother, Philip of Saint-Pol.

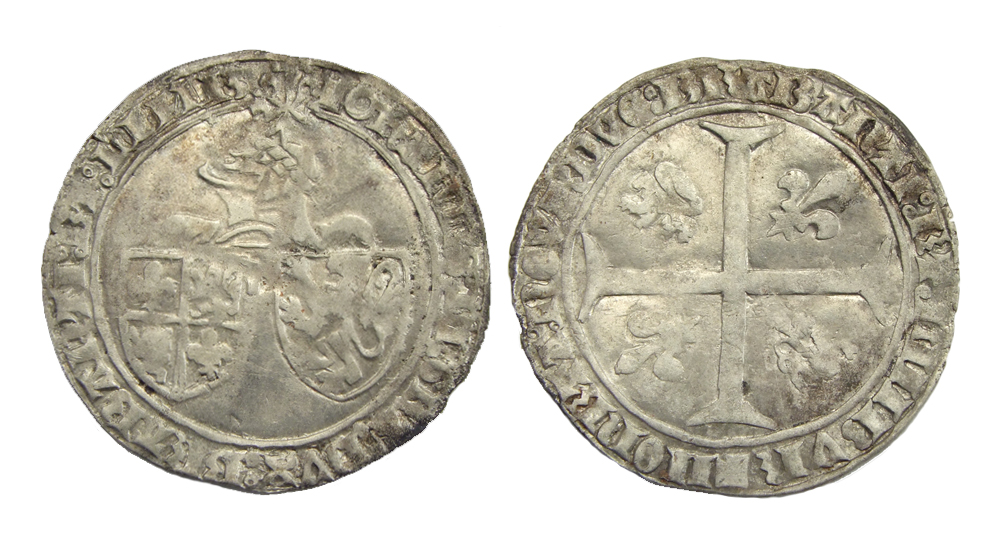
Double groat, struck in Maastricht under the reign of John IV, Duke of Brabant and Limburg (1415–1427)

== Legacy ==
He is often typified as a weak prince, who was easily influenced by more shrewd and politically able men, such as Philip the Good and John III of Holland. His age and inexperience would have played a major role in this characterization.

== Ancestors ==
Ancestors of John IV of Brabant

16. Philip VI of France
8. John II of France
17. Joan the Lame
4. Philip the Bold
18. John I of Bohemia
9. Bonne of Bohemia
19. Elisabeth of Bohemia
2. Anthony, Duke of Brabant
20. Louis I of Flanders
10. Louis II of Flanders
21. Margaret I, Countess of Burgundy
5. Margaret III, Countess of Flanders
22. John III, Duke of Brabant
11. Margaret of Brabant
23. Marie d'Évreux
1. John IV, Duke of Brabant
24. John I of Luxembourg, Lord of Ligny
12. Guy I of Luxembourg, Count of Ligny
25. Alix of Dampierre
6. Waleran III of Luxembourg, Count of Ligny
26. Jean de Châtillon-Saint-Pol
13. Mahaut of Châtillon
27. Jeanne de Fiennes
3. Jeanne of Saint-Pol
28. Robert de Holland, 1st Baron Holand
14. Thomas Holland, 1st Earl of Kent
29. Maud la Zouche
7. Lady Maud Holland
30. Edmund of Woodstock, 1st Earl of Kent
15. Joan of Kent
31. Margaret Wake, 3rd Baroness Wake of Liddell

== Notes ==
John IV of Brabant House of Valois Born: 11 June 1403 Died: 17 April 1427
| Preceded by Jacqueline | Count of Hainaut, Holland and Zeeland; 1418–1427 | Succeeded by Philip the Good |
| Preceded by Antoon | Duke of Brabant, Lothier, and Limburg; 1415–1427 | Succeeded by Philip of Saint-Pol |
