= Joan of Saint-Pol =

European noble (died 1407)

Joan of Saint-Pol (French: Jeanne; died 1407) was the only daughter of Waleran III of Luxembourg and his first wife, Maud Holland.

In 1402 she married Duke Anthony of Brabant (d. 1415) killed at Agincourt by English archers, fighting against King Henry V of England. She was the mother of Duke John IV of Brabant (1403-1427) and Count Philip of Saint-Pol (1404-1430).
