= John of Burgundy (bishop of Cambrai) =

15th-century archbishop of Trier (1404–1479)

- Bishop of Cambrai
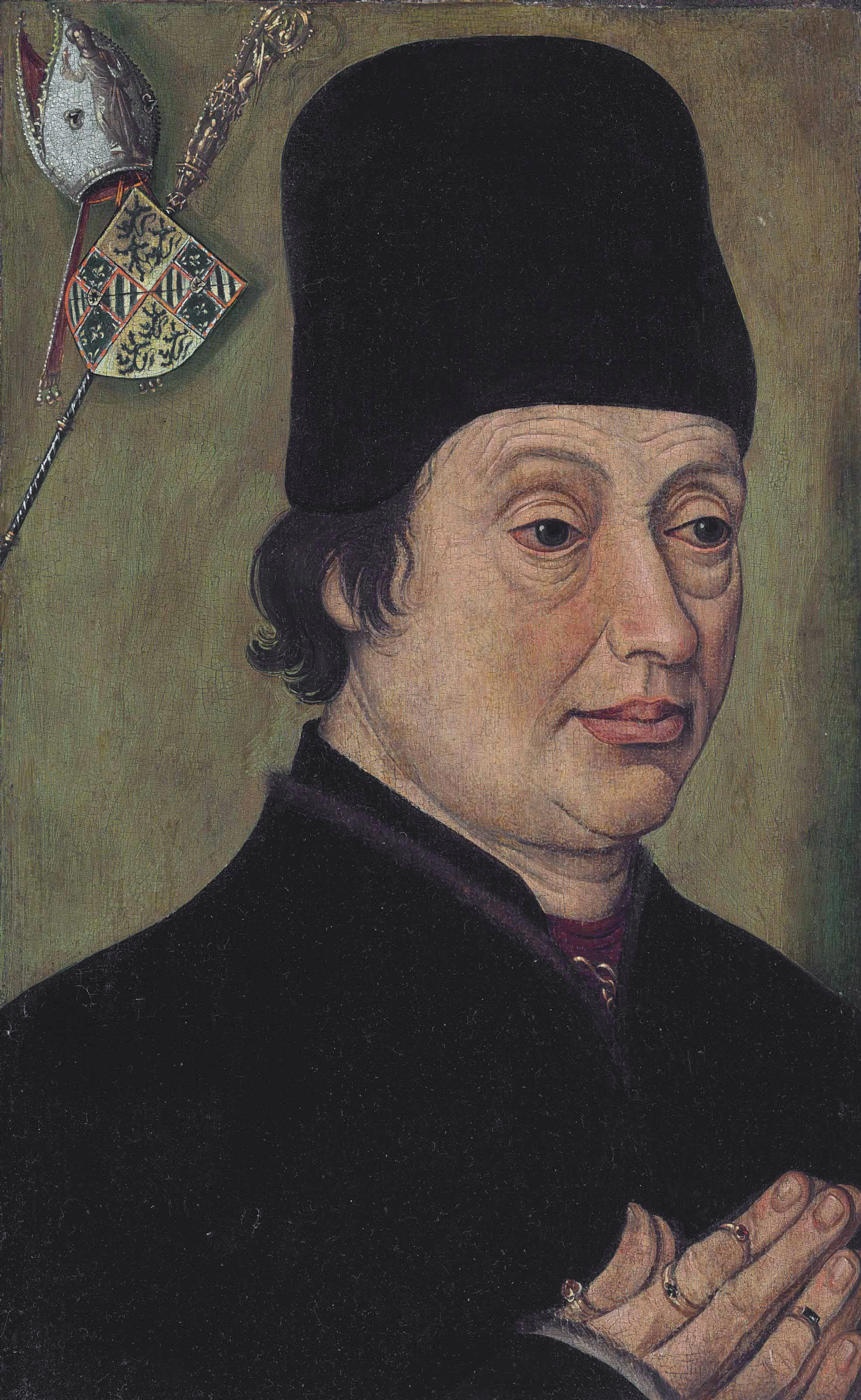

Personal details
- Born: 1404 Dijon, France
- Died: 27 April 1479 (aged 74–75) Mechelen, Belgium
- Buried: Brussels, Belgium
- Denomination: Christianity
- Parents: John the Fearless & Agnes de Croÿ

John of Burgundy (1404 – 27 April 1479), also known as Jean de Bourgogne, was the illegitimate son of John the Fearless, through his mistress Agnes de Croy, daughter of Jean I de Croÿ and was appointed Archbishop of Trier, served as Bishop of Cambrai from 1439 to 1479, Provost of St. Donatian's Cathedral and St. Peter's Cathedral at Lille. He was the great-grandson of King John II of France.

== Church manipulation ==
Historians have noted that Bishop John was part of the manipulation of the church by the Dukes of Burgundy during this era, with his father being accused of nepotism and cronyism in having his relatives and supporters appointed to bishoprics, abbacies, and chapters to gain more control and influence over church. His father appointed his own chancellor as the Bishop of Tournai, John as the Bishop of Cambrai, and John's father Philip had his son David appointed Bishop of Utrecht. Philip also appointed the church officials at Tournai, Arras, Cologne, Besançon, Autun, Mâcon and Auxerre.

== Papal appointment ==
In 1446, Pope Eugene IV was engaged in an internal church conflict over the validity of his papacy with Felix V. Recognized by the Kings of Castile, France, and England, Eugenius took steps to solidify his support within the church by ex-communicating and deposing supporters of Felix, including the Archbishops at Trier and Cologne. Eugenius appointed John to fill the vacant Archbishopric at Trier, however, the appointment was disputed.

== Illegitimate children ==
John fathered numerous illegitimate children; it is written that he celebrated mass once at Cambrai in the presence of his 36 illegitimate sons or grandsons.
