= Anthony of Brabant =

European noble (1384–1415)

Anthony, Duke of Brabant
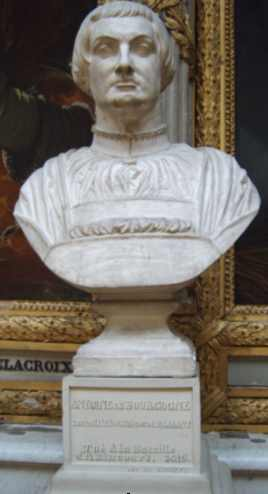
- A bust of Anthony in the Château de Versailles
- Born: August 1384
- Died: 25 October 1415 (aged 31); Agincourt
- Buried: Saint John the Evangelist Church, Tervuren
- Noble family: Valois-Burgundy-Brabant
- Spouses: Jeanne of Saint-Pol; Elisabeth of Görlitz
- Issue Detail: John IV, Duke of Brabant; Philip I, Duke of Brabant
- Father: Philip II, Duke of Burgundy
- Mother: Margaret III of Flanders

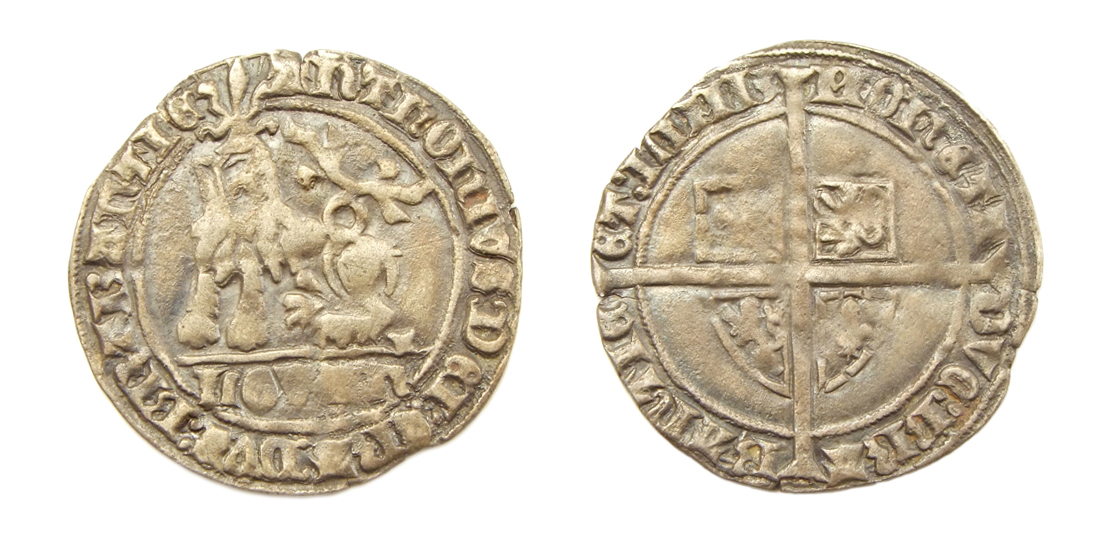
AR Gros or ½ Botdrager, struck in Leuven under Anthony, Duke of Brabant.

Anthony, Duke of Brabant (21 August 1384 – 25 October 1415), also known as Antoine de Brabant, Antoine de Bourgogne, and Anthony of Burgundy, was Count of Rethel (1402–1406), Duke of Brabant, Lothier and Limburg (1406–1415), and Co-Duke of Luxemburg (1411–1415). He was killed at the battle of Agincourt.

== Biography ==
Anthony was the son of Philip the Bold, Duke of Burgundy, and Margaret III, Countess of Flanders, and brother of John the Fearless. When his great-aunt Joanna died childless in 1406, Anthony inherited the Duchy of Brabant, Lothier, and Limburg.

The Duke of Brabant arrived late to the Battle of Agincourt, and in his eagerness to reach the field, he borrowed and dressed in the improvised armour of his chamberlain and wore a surcoat made from a trumpeter's flag. He charged mounted to the battlefield with a few of his retainers, crying out "Brabant! Brabant!". Upon reaching the English lines, he was knocked down and captured by some English archers. He was executed by a slit in the throat, along with the rest of the prisoners ordered by King Henry V of England, the English were unaware of his high status and ransom value due to his makeshift surcoat.

The execution was carried out as the much smaller English force found itself stretched to its limits, guarding prisoners with the battle still not won. A counterattack led by Ysembart d'Azincourt on the King's baggage train (guarded only by women and children) is thought to have driven King Henry to the decision, thinking he was being attacked from the rear and some chroniclers have given Brabant's belated charge as this very cause, adding to the Duke's chivalric but tragic final story. Subsequently the executions stopped immediately when the attack was seen to falter.

== Marriages and family ==
Anthony married at Arras on 21 February 1402 to Jeanne of Saint-Pol (d. 1407), daughter of Waleran III of Luxembourg, Count of Ligny and Saint-Pol. They had:

- John IV, Duke of Brabant (1403–1427)
- Philip of Saint-Pol (1404–1430), Duke of Brabant from 1427 to 1430.

Anthony married again at Brussels, on 16 July 1409, Elisabeth of Görlitz, duchess of Luxembourg (November 1390 – 8 August 1451), daughter of John, Duke of Görlitz. They had no children. (Note: Per Blockmans and Prevenier, "Neither of Elizabeth's marriages produced offspring.")

He also had a daughter, Anna of Brabant (fl. 1440-1462), who went on to marry Pedro de Peralta y Ezpeleta. Anna and Pedro had three children together: Pedro, also known as Pierres the Younger, who died without issue; Juana de Peralta, Countess of Santisteban de Lerín, who married Troilo Carrillo, Count of Agosta in Sicily, and had one son; and Isabel de Peralta, who married Juan IV Enríquez de Lacarra y Navarra, sixth lord of Ablitas.

== Ancestry ==
Ancestors of Anthony of Brabant

8. Philip VI of France
4. John II of France
9. Joan the Lame
2. Philip the Bold
10. John of Bohemia
5. Bonne of Bohemia
11. Elizabeth of Bohemia
1. Anthony, Duke of Brabant
12. Louis I, Count of Flanders
6. Louis II, Count of Flanders
13. Margaret I, Countess of Burgundy
3. Margaret III, Countess of Flanders
14. John III, Duke of Brabant
7. Margaret of Brabant
15. Marie of Évreux

== Sources ==
- Blockmans, Willem Pieter; Prevenier, Walter (1999). The Promised Lands: The Low Countries under Burgundian rule, 1369–1530. University Pennsylvania Press.
- Curry, Anne, ed. (2000). The Battle of Agincourt: Sources and Interpretations. The Boydell Press.
- Vaughan, Richard (2009). Philip the Bold. The Boydell Press.

== See also ==
- Dukes of Burgundy family tree
- Dukes of Brabant family tree

Anthony of Brabant House of Valois-Burgundy-Brabant Cadet branch of the House of Valois Born: August 1384 Died: 25 October 1415
Regnal titles
Preceded by Margaret and Philip I	Count of Rethel; 1402–1407	Succeeded by Philip II
Preceded by Joanna	Duke of Brabant, Lothier, and Limburg; 1406–1415	Succeeded by John IV
Preceded by Jobst	Duke of Luxemburg; 1411–1415; With: Elisabeth I	Succeeded by Elisabeth I
