= Brabant =

Brabant is a traditional geographical region (or regions) in the Low Countries of Europe. It may refer to:

== Place names in Europe ==
=== Belgium ===
- Province of Brabant, divided in 1995 into two provinces and an autonomous region:
  - Flemish Brabant, in the Flanders region; the Dutch speaking part of the former Brabant province.
  - Walloon Brabant, in the Wallonia region; the French speaking part of the former Brabant province.
  - Brussels-Capital Region, bilingual between French and Dutch.
- Klein-Brabant, the municipalities Bornem, Puurs and Sint-Amands in the Antwerp province of Flanders region
- East Brabant, or Hageland, an area east of Brussels between the cities of Leuven, Aarschot, Diest and Tienen

=== Netherlands ===
- North Brabant province

=== France ===
- Brabant-en-Argonne, commune in the Meuse department
- Brabant-le-Roi, commune in the Meuse department
  - Brabant-lès-Villers (1973–1982), former commune, amalgamation of Brabant-le-Roi and Villers-aux-Vents

=== Geology ===
- London-Brabant Massif, a geological structure stretching from England to northern Germany

== Historical use ==
- Pagus of Brabant, the original, an early medieval territory under jurisdiction of several counts
- Landgraviate of Brabant (1085–1183), an expansive medieval lordship, core of the later Duchy
- Duchy of Brabant, a duchy of the Holy Roman Empire from 1183 until the French Revolution, by which time the northern half had been lost to the Dutch Republic
- Staats-Brabant, a former part of the duchy governed by the States-General of the Dutch Republic from 1588 until the French Revolution
- Département of Brabant, a département under various forms of French control, predecessor of modern North Brabant

== Royalty and nobility ==
- House of Brabant descended from the Reginarid family of Lotharingia
- Duke of Brabant, a dynastic title of the modern Belgian royal family

== Place names outside Europe ==
- Brabant Lake, Saskatchewan, Canada
- Port Brabant, former name of Tuktoyaktuk, Canada
- Brabant, West Virginia, United States
- Le Morne Brabant, a mountain on Mauritius
- Brabant Island, Antarctica

== Other uses ==
- Brabant (or Brabançon), other names for the Belgian Draught, a Belgian breed of horse
- Brabantian dialect, a Dutch dialect that had a major influence on the formation of Standard Dutch
- Brabançonne (or "the Brabantian"), the national anthem of Belgium
- Brabant killers, a 1980s criminal group in Belgium
- HNLMS Noord-Brabant ('North Brabant'), several ships of the Dutch navy
- Brabant Company, precursor of the Dutch East India Company (VOC)
- Brabant (train), a Paris-Brussels express train 1963–1995
- Brabant (cruise ship), operated by Fred. Olsen Cruise Lines
