= Reginarids =

Noble family of medieval Belgium

House of Brabant Maison de Brabant House of Hainaut, House of Louvain
- Ducal noble family
- Country: Holy Roman Empire; Kingdom of France; Kingdom of England; Duchy of Brabant
- Earlier spellings: Reginarids
- Etymology: Descendant of Reginar
- Founded: 880; 1146 years ago
- Founder: Reginar I, Count of Hainaut
- Current head: Donatus, Landgrave of Hesse
- Final ruler: Joanna, Duchess of Brabant
- Titles: Landgrave/Duke of Brabant; Duke of Limburg; Duke of Lothier; Duke of Lorraine; Margrave of Antwerp; Count of Louvain; Count of Hainaut
- Estate: Coudenberg
- Dissolution: 1406; 620 years ago (senior branch)
- Cadet branches: House of Hesse; House of Percy

The Reginarids (or Regnarids, Regniers, Reiniers, etc.) were a family of magnates in Lower Lotharingia during the Carolingian and Ottonian period. Their modern name is derived from the personal name which many members of the family bore, and which is seen as a Leitname of the family. At least two Dukes of Lotharingia in the 10th century belonged to this family. After a period of exile and rebellion, the two brothers who returned to power founded the first dynasties of the County of Hainault and County of Louvain. The latter were ancestors of the House of Brabant, Landgraves and later Dukes of Brabant, Lothier and Limburg. The Reginarid Brabant dynasty ended in 1355, leaving its duchies to the House of Luxembourg which in turn left them to the House of Valois-Burgundy in 1383. Junior branches of the male line include the medieval male line of the English House of Percy, Earls of Northumberland, and the German House of Hesse which ruled Hesse from 1264 until 1918, included King Frederick of Sweden and still exists today.

== History ==
The first probable ancestor known with any confidence is Gilbert, Count of the Maasgau (mentioned in 841) who served King Lothair I, but defected to Lothair's half-brother Charles the Bald during the civil war of 840–843. In 846 Gilbert abducted an unnamed daughter of Lothair and married her in an attempt to force Lothair to reinstate him. Reginar, Duke of Lorraine (c. 850–916) is believed to be Gilbert's son. Following the death of Charles the Fat, the Reginarids began a long fight with the Conradines for supremacy in Lotharingia. When they triumphed, in 910, it was in electing Charles the Simple as king. It was the combined forces of Bruno I of Lorraine and the Carolingians of West Francia that finally broke the Reginarids' hold on power. In 958, Reginar III had his lands confiscated and redistributed to Gerard, Count of Metz, of the Matfridings, enemies of his family since the reign of Zwentibold.

The Reginarids supported Lothair of France against Otto II, but they made a deal with the latter in 978.

The Reginarids were no longer a unified family by the end of the tenth century. Their descendants in Mons and Louvain continued their spirit of opposition to the king. The house also produced a queen-consort of England in the form of Adeliza of Leuven, who married Henry I of England.

== Rulers ==
Dukes of Lorraine

- Reginar (910–915)
- Gilbert (915–939)

Coat of Arms of Hainaut

Counts of Hainaut

- Reginar I (r. ?–898 and 908–915)
- Reginar II (r. 915 – after 932)
- Reginar III (r. before 940–958)
- Reginar IV (r. 973–974)
- Reginar V (r. 1013–1039), acquired the southern part of the Brabant province around 1024
- Herman (r. 1039–1051), married Richilda, acquired Valenciennes around 1045 or 1049

Counts of Leuven, Counts of Brussels

- 1003–1015 : Lambert I, was the first Count of Louvain, son of Reginar III Count of Hainaut
- 1015–1038 : Henry I, (son of Lambert I)
- 1038–1040 : Otto
- 1040–1054 : Lambert II, (son of Lambert I)
- 1054–1079 : Henry II, (son of Lambert II)
- 1079–1086 : Henry III, (son of Henry II)

Dukes of Lower Lorraine

- Godfrey I of Leuven (1106–1129) (also known as Godfrey V), brother of Henry III, Count of Louvain
- Godfrey II of Leuven (1139–1142) (also known as Godfrey VI)
- Godfrey III of Leuven (1142–1190) (also known as Godfrey VII)

Passes to Henry I, Duke of Brabant (1190–1235), see below: Duke of Brabant

Counts of Leuven, Counts of Brussels and Landgraves of Brabant:

- Henry III (1085/1086–1095); already Count of Leuven and Brussels from 1078.
- Godfrey I (from 1095)

Counts of Leuven, Counts of Brussels, Landgraves of Brabant, Margrave of Antwerp and Dukes of Lower-Lorraine:

- Godfrey I (1106–1139) appointed as Duke in 1106
- Godfrey II (1139–1142)
- Godfrey III (1142–1190)

Dukes of Brabant and Dukes of Lothier:

Coat of arms of the Dukes of Brabant and Limburg

- Henry I (1190–1235); already Duke of Brabant from 1183/1184
- Henry II (1235–1248)
- Henry III (1248–1261), his younger half brother Henry I, Landgrave of Hesse inherited Hesse from his mother and became the founder of the House of Hesse
- Henry IV (1261–1267)

Dukes of Brabant, Dukes of Lothier and Dukes of Limburg:

- John I (1267–1294)
- John II (1294–1312)
- John III (1312–1355)
- Joanna (1355–1406), married Wenceslaus I, Duke of Luxembourg

== Family tree ==
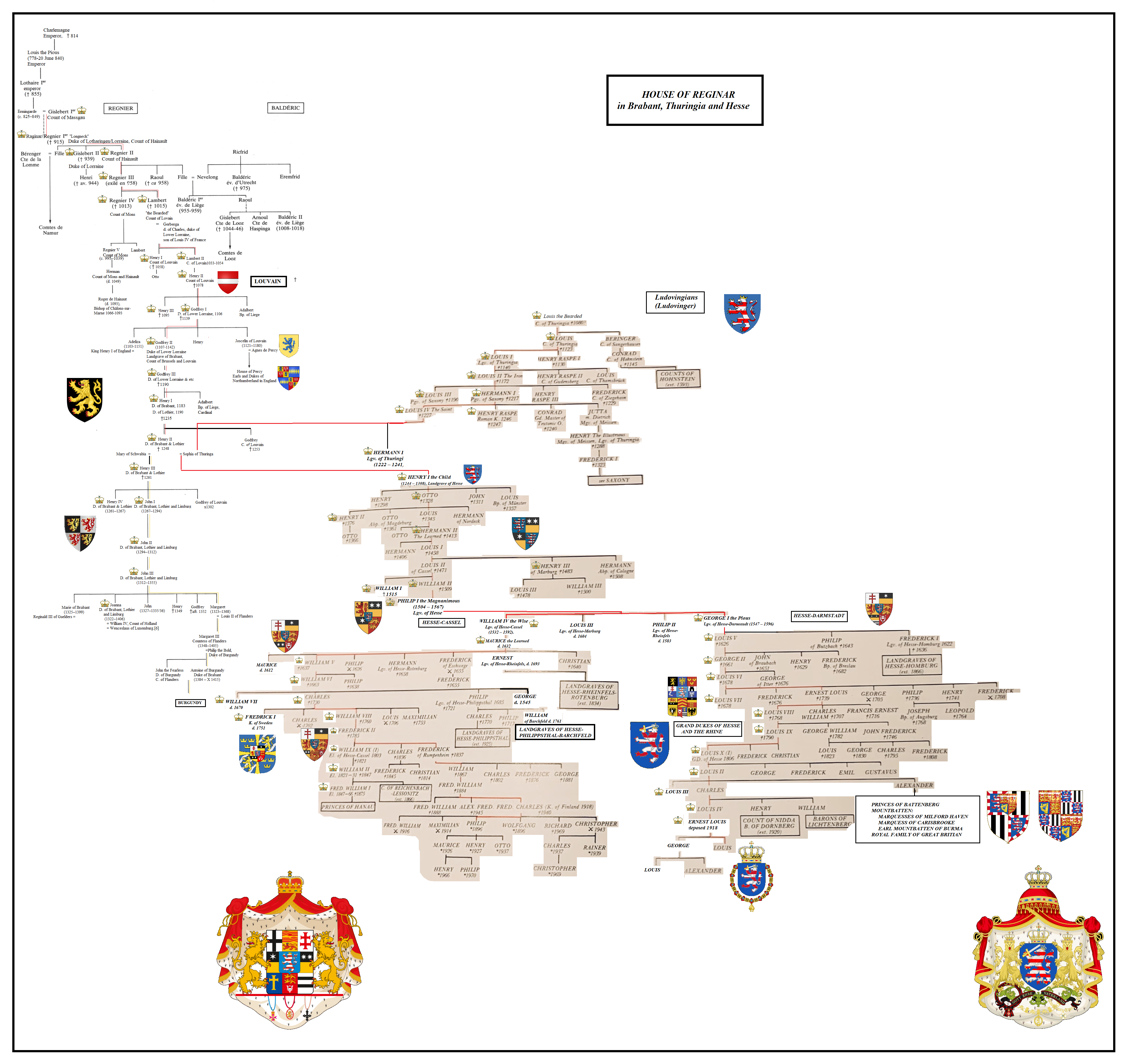
House of Reginar in Lorraine, Brabant, Thuringia and Hesse

== Sources ==
- Reuter, Timothy. Germany in the Early Middle Ages 800–1056. New York: Longman, 1991.
- Family tree of Reginars and Balderics: KUPPER, Jean-Louis. Annexe II. Les Régnier et les Balderic In: Liège et l’Église impériale aux XIe-XIIe siècles [en línea]. Liége: Presses universitaires de Liège, 1981 (generado el 02 julio 2017). Disponible en Internet: <http://books.openedition.org/pulg/1472>. ISBN 9782821828681. DOI: 10.4000/books.pulg.1472.
