= Albero I of Louvain =

Albero I of Louvain (1070 – 1 January 1128) was the 57th Prince-Bishop of Liège from 1123 until his death.

Albero was the third son of Henry II, Count of Leuven and Adela of Tweisterbant.

After the suspicious death of Prince-Bishop Frederick of Liege in 1121, Holy Roman Emperor Henry V appointed Alexander of Jülich as his successor. But Friedrich von Schwarzenburg, Archbishop of Cologne refused to ordain Alexander, and the see remained vacant.

The next year, the Concordat of Worms was signed between the Emperor and Pope Callixtus II. As a consequence, Albero of Leuven became the new Bishop of Liège in 1123.

Albero restored order in the Bishopric with the support of his brother Godfrey I, Count of Leuven.

== Sources ==
- (in French) Pierre François Xavier de Ram, Albéron I, Biographie Nationale, part 1, col. 177-182, Brussels, 1866
- (in French) Information on Albero I on the website about the history of the Prince-Bishopric
