= Henry II of Louvain =

Count of Louvain

Henry II
- Count of Louvain; Count of Brussels
- Born: c. 1020
- Died: 1078
- Noble family: House of Reginar
- Spouse: Adèle
- Issue: Henry III, Count of Louvain; Godfrey I, Count of Louvain; Albero I of Louvain, Prince-Bishop of Liège; Ide
- Father: Lambert II, Count of Louvain
- Mother: Oda of Verdun

Henry II (Dutch: Hendrik, French: Henri) was the Count of Louvain (Leuven) from 1054 through 1071 (?). Henry II was the son of Lambert II, Count of Louvain and Oda of Verdun. His maternal uncles included Pope Stephen IX and Duke Godfrey the Bearded of Lorraine.

== Marriage and issue ==
Henry married Adela of Thuringia. Henry and Adela had several sons and a daughter:

- Henry III, Count of Louvain (d. 1095). He married Gertrude of Flanders (1080–1117), daughter of Robert I of Flanders and Gertrude of Saxony. They probably bore duchess Adelaide wife of Simon I of Lorraine, and countess Gertrude wife to Lambert, count of Montaigu and Clermont.
- Godfrey I, Count of Louvain (1060–1139). He married Ida de Chiny & Namur, who bore at least five children e.g. Godfrey II of Louvain, Duke of Lower Lorraine. later he married Clementia of Burgundy and bore Joceline of Louvain.
- Albero I of Louvain, Bishop of Liège
- Ida of Louvain, who married Baldwin II, Count of Hainaut.

== Ancestry ==
Ancestors of Henry II of Louvain

Reginar II, Count of Hainaut (890 - 932)
Reginar III, Count of Hainaut (c. 920 – 973)
Adelaide of Burgundy
Lambert I of Louvain (c. 950 - 1015)
Adela
Lambert II, Count of Louvain (d. 1054)
Louis IV of France (920 - 954)
Charles, Duke of Lower Lorraine (953 – 993)
Gerberga of Saxony (913 - 984)
Gerberga of Lorraine (c. 980 - 1018)
Adelaide
Henry II of Leuven; Count of Louvain, Count of Brussels
Gozlin, Count of Bidgau and Methingau
Godfrey I, Count of Verdun (d. 1002)
Oda of Metz
Gothelo I, Duke of Lorraine (c. 967 – 1044)
Hermann Billung, "vice duke of Saxony" (c. 910 - 973)
Matilda Billung of Saxony (c. 940 - 1008)
Oda of Verdun (Lorraine)

== See also ==
- Dukes of Brabant family tree
- Chronique des Ducs de Brabant, Adrian van Baerland, Antwerp (1612).

Regnal titles
Preceded by Lambert II	Count of Louvain; 1054-1078	Succeeded by Henry III
