= Godfrey III =

Godfrey III may refer to:

- Godfrey III, Duke of Lower Lorraine (c. 997–1069)
- Godfrey III, Count of Louvain (1142–1190)
