= Lower Lotharingia =

Stem duchy of the medieval Kingdom of Germany

Duchy of Lower Lotharingia
- 959–1190
- Banner Shield

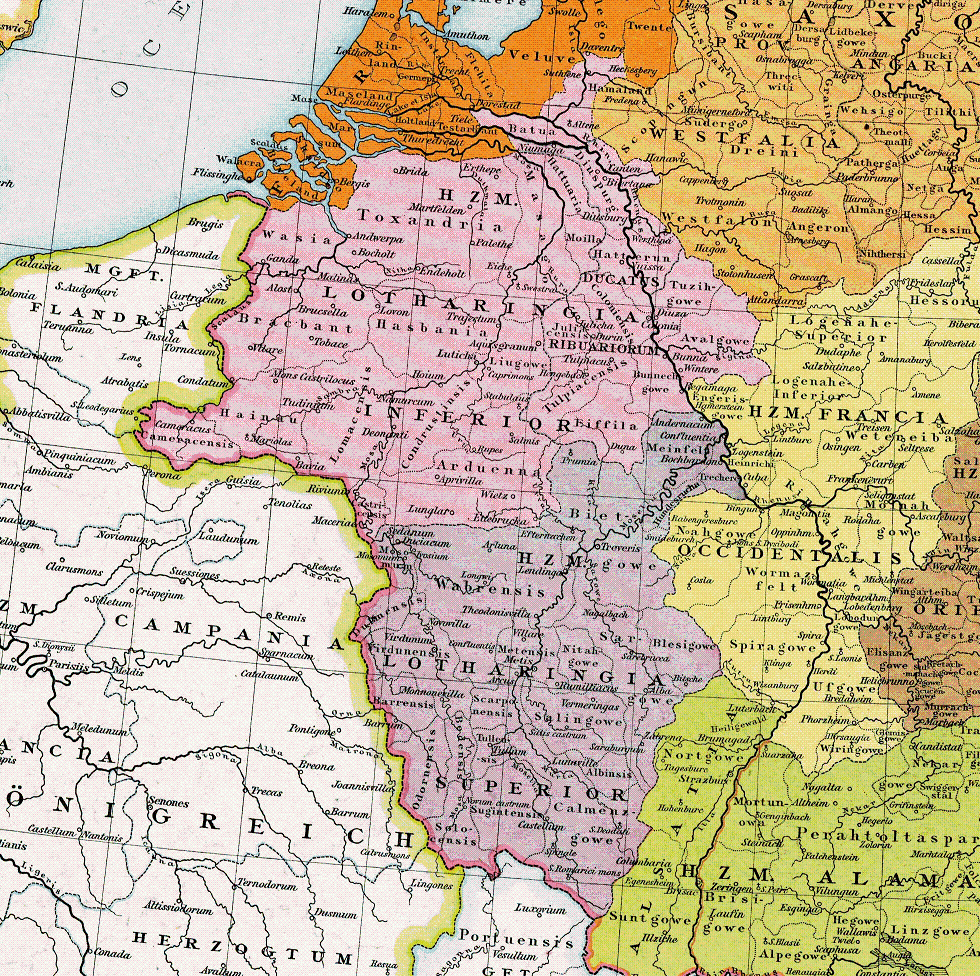
- Pink: Lower (Northern) Lotharingia in 977 Orange: Friesland
- Status: Part of East Francia (until 962); Part of the Holy Roman Empire
- Capital: Brussels
- Common languages: Old Dutch; Old Frisian; Old French; Old Low German
- Religion: Christianity
- Government: Feudal duchy
- Duke
  - 959–964: Godfrey I (first)
  - 1142–1190: Godfrey VIII (last)
- Historical era: Middle Ages
  - Established: 959
  - Disestablished: 1190
Preceded by
Lotharingia
Succeeded by
Prince-Bishopric of Liège
Electorate of Cologne
Bishopric of Cambrai
Duchy of Cleves
Duchy of Limburg
County of Namur
Landgraviate of Brabant
County of Holland
Prince-Bishopric of Utrecht
Counts of Louvain
Duchy of Guelders
Duchy of Jülich
Duchy of Berg
County of Loon
County of Horne
Frisian freedom

The Duchy of Lower Lotharingia, also known as Northern Lotharingia, and alternatively called Lower Lorraine or Northern Lorraine (in titles, also referred to as Lothier or Lottier), was a duchy of the medieval Kingdom of Germany within the Holy Roman Empire, established upon the division of the Stem Duchy of Lotharingia in 959/965. It existed until the end of the 12th century, encompassing almost all of modern Netherlands (the region of Frisia was loosely associated with the duchy, but the dukes exercised no de facto control over the territory), Belgium, Luxembourg, and parts of modern Germany and France.

== History ==
Within the Carolingian Empire, old historical regions of Austrasia and Ripuaria were reorganized on several occasions, depending on dynastic divisions that were frequent throughout the 9th century. In 855, upon the Treaty of Prüm that divided the Middle Francia, king Lothair II (855-869) received regions along rivers Meuse, Moselle and Lower Rhine, and in time his realm came to be known as Lotharingia. It was later divided, reunited or attached to neighboring realms (West Francia and East Francia) on several occasions. At the beginning of the 10th century, it was transformed into the Stem Duchy of Lotharingia. In 953, German king Otto I awarded the governance over the entire Duchy of Lotharingia to his brother Bruno the Great, the Archbishop of Cologne, who thus became the Duke of Lotharingia. In 959, Bruno divided the Duchy in two distinctive jurisdictions, one for the southern half (Upper Lotharingia), and the other for the northern half (Lower Lotharingia), and that division became permanent following his death in 965. Both regions thus formed the western part of the Holy Roman Empire, established by Bruno's elder brother, emperor Otto I in 962, but the exact chronology and nature of those divisions, that resulted in the creation of two distinctive duchies, is debated among scholars.

Upon division, Lower Lotharingia was granted to count Godfrey I of Mons (Hainaut) who thus became the duke of Lower Lotharingia. Godfrey's lands were to the north (lower down the Rhine river system), while Upper Lotharingia was to the south (further up the river system). Both Lotharingian duchies took very separate paths thereafter: Upon the death of Godfrey's son Duke Richar, Lower Lotharingia was directly ruled by the emperor, until in 977 Otto II enfeoffed Charles, the exiled younger brother of King Lothair of France. Lower and Upper Lorraine were once again briefly reunited under Gothelo I from 1033 to 1044. After that, the Lower duchy was quickly marginalised, while Upper Lorraine came to be known as simply the Duchy of Lorraine.

Over the next decades the significance of the Duchy of Lower Lotharingia diminished and furthermore was affected by the conflict between Emperors Henry IV and Henry V: In 1100 Henry IV had enfeoffed Count Henry of Limburg, whom Henry V, having enforced the abdication of his father, immediately deposed and replaced by Count Godfrey I of Louvain. Upon the death of Duke Godfrey III in 1190, his son Duke Henry I of Brabant inherited the ducal title by order of Emperor Henry VI at the Diet of Schwäbisch Hall. Thereby the Duchy of Lower Lotharingia finally lost its territorial authority, while the remnant Imperial fief held by the dukes of Brabant was later called the Duchy of Lothier (or Lothryk).

Since Lower Lotharingia was encompassing the old historical region of Ripuaria, mentioned as such in various sources from both Carolingian and post-Carolingian era, such as the Annals of Saint Bertin, the Annals of Fulda, and others, with even king Lothair II (855-869) being mentioned in the Annals of Xanten as king of Ripuaria (rex Ripuariae), or king of Ripuarians (rex Ripuariorum), it became customary in time to use similar archaic designations for Lower Lotharingia and its inhabitants. Thus, Wipo of Burgundy (d. 1050) was mentioning the inhabitants of Lower Lotharingia as Ripuarians (Latin: Ribuarii), and their duke as the duke of Ripuarians (Latin: dux Ribuariorum).

== Dukes of Lower Lorraine ==
Note that the numbering of the dukes varies between sources.

Matfriding dynasty

- Godfrey I (959–964)
- Richer I (964-972)

After the death of Richer, the duchy was directly administrated by the holy emperor until the arrival of Charles I

Carolingian dynasty

- Charles I (977–991)
- Otto I (991–1012)

House of Ardennes–Verdun

- Godfrey II (1012–1023) (also known as Godfrey I)
- Gothelo I (1023–1044) (also duke of Upper Lorraine)
- Gothelo II (1044–1046)

House of (Ardenne–) Luxembourg

- Frederick I (1046–1065)

House of Ardennes–Verdun

- Godfrey III the Bearded (1065–1069) (also known as Godfrey II, previously duke of Upper Lorraine)
- Godfrey IV (1069–1076) (also known as Godfrey III)

Salian dynasty

- Conrad (1076–1087), but he's only two years old when he's given the title, Albert III of Namur will be vice-duke during this time.

House of Boulogne (Ardennes–Bouillon)

- Godfrey V "of Bouillon" (1087–1100) (also known as Godfrey IV), one of the leaders of the First Crusade and the first ruler of the Kingdom of Jerusalem

House of Limburg

- Henry I (1101–1106)

House of Leuven

- Godfrey VI (1106–1129) (also known as Godfrey I of Leuven)

House of Limburg

- Waleran (1129–1139)

House of Leuven

- Godfrey VII (1139–1142) (also known as Godfrey II of Leuven)
- Godfrey VIII (1142–1190) (also known as Godfrey III of Leuven)

Disintegrates. Title passes to the Duke of Brabant, who until 1795 kept the title "Duke of Lothier".

== Successor states ==
History of the Low Countries (schematic)
Frisii		Germanic tribes		Belgae & Celts			
Frisii	Cana– nefates (Note: Roman foederati)	Chamavi, Tubantes (Note: The Chamavi merged into the confederation of the Franks; the Tubantes merged into the confederation of the Saxons.)		Gallia Belgica (55 BC–c. 5th century AD); Germania Inferior (83–c. 5th century)			
Frisii	Cana– nefates	Salian Franks		Batavi			
unpopulated (4th –c. 5th centuries)		Saxons	Salian Franks (4th–c. 5th centuries)				
Frisian Kingdom (c. 6th century – 734)		Saxons	Frankish Kingdom (481–843)—Carolingian Empire (800–843)				
Frisian Kingdom (c. 6th century – 734)		Austrasia (511–687)					
Middle Francia (843–855)				West; Francia (from 843)	Middle Francia (843–855)		
Kingdom of Lotharingia (Note: Part of East Francia after 939, divided in Upper Lorraine (as part of West Francia) and Lower Lorraine (as part of East Francia) in 959.) (855–959); Duchy of Lower Lorraine (Note: Lower Lorraine—also referred to as Lothier—disintegrated into several smaller independent territories and only the title of a "Duke of Lothier" remained, held by Brabant.) (from 959)			Kingdom of Lotharingia (855–959); Duchy of Lower Lorraine (from 959)	West; Francia (from 843)	Kingdom of Lotharingia (855–959); Duchy of Lower Lorraine (from 959)		
Frisia			Kingdom of Lotharingia (855–959); Duchy of Lower Lorraine (from 959)	County of Flanders (Note: Including County of Artois (part of Flanders until 1237) and Tournaisis.) (862–1384)	Kingdom of Lotharingia (855–959); Duchy of Lower Lorraine (from 959)		
Frisian; Freedom (Note: Lordship of Frisia and Lordship of Groningen (including the Ommelanden) after 1524 and 1536 respectively.) (11th–16th centuries)	County of Holland (Note: Including County of Zeeland, that was ruled by neighboring County of Holland and County of Flanders (until 1432).) (880–1432)	Bishopric of Utrecht (Note: Utrecht included Lordship of Overijssel (until 1528), County of Drenthe (until 1528) and County of Zutphen (until 1182).) (695–1456)	Duchy of Brabant (Note: Duchy of Brabant included since 1288 also the Duchy of Limburg (now part of Belgium's Liège Province) and the "Overmaas" lands Dalhem, Valkenburg and Herzogenrath (now part of the Dutch Province of Limburg).) (1183–1430) Duchy of Guelders (Note: The county, later duchy, of Guelders consisted of four quarters, as they were separated by rivers: situated upstream Upper Quarter (the present day northern half of the Dutch province of Limburg), spatially separated from the three downstream Lower Quarters: County of Zutphen (after 1182), Veluwe Quarter and Nijmegen Quarter. The three lower quarters emerged from the historic gau Hamaland (named after the Chamavi tribe), and formed the present day province of Gelderland. Guelders did not include the Cleves enclave Huissen and the independent counties of Buren and Culemborg, that were much later seceded to the province of Gelderland.) (1046–1543)	County of Flanders (862–1384)	County of Hainaut (1071–1432) County of Namur (981–1421)	Prince- Bishopric of Liège (Note: Throughout the Middle Ages, the bishopric was further expanded with the Duchy of Bouillon in 1096 (ceded to France in 1678), the acquisition of the county of Loon in 1366 and the county of Horne in 1568. The Lordship of Mechelen was also part of the Prince-Bishopric of Liège.)(980–1791)	Duchy of Luxembourg (1059–1443)
Frisian; Freedom (11th–16th centuries)	Burgundian Netherlands (1384–1482)					Prince- Bishopric of Liège (980–1791)	Burgundian Netherlands (1384–1482)
Habsburg Netherlands (1482–1795) (Seventeen Provinces after 1543) (Note: The name Seventeen Provinces came in use after the Habsburg emperor Charles V had re-acquired the Duchy of Guelders, and an continuous territory arose.)						Prince- Bishopric of Liège (980–1791)	Habsburg Netherlands (1482–1795) (Seventeen Provinces after 1543)
Dutch Republic (1581–1795)				Spanish Netherlands (1556–1714)		Prince- Bishopric of Liège (980–1791)	Spanish Netherlands (1556–1714)
Dutch Republic (1581–1795)				Austrian Netherlands (1714–1795)		Prince- Bishopric of Liège (980–1791)	Austrian Netherlands (1714–1795)
Dutch Republic (1581–1795)				United States of Belgium (1790)		Republic of Liège (1789–'91)	United States of Belgium (1790)
Dutch Republic (1581–1795)				Austrian Netherlands (1795–1797)		P.-Bish. of Liège (1791–1794)	Austrian Netherlands (1795–1797)
Batavian Republic (1795–1806); Kingdom of Holland (1806–1810)			associated with French First Republic (1795–1804) part of First French Empire (1804–1815)				
part of First French Empire (1810–1813)			associated with French First Republic (1795–1804) part of First French Empire (1804–1815)				
Sovereign Principality of the Netherlands (1813–1815)			associated with French First Republic (1795–1804) part of First French Empire (1804–1815)				
United Kingdom of the Netherlands (1815–1830)							Grand Duchy of Luxembourg (from 1815)
Kingdom of the Netherlands (from 1839)				Kingdom of Belgium (from 1830)			Grand Duchy of Luxembourg (from 1815)
Kingdom of the Netherlands (from 1839)				Kingdom of Belgium (from 1830)			Grand Duchy of Luxembourg (from 1890)

After the territorial power of the duchy was shattered, many fiefdoms came to imperial immediacy in its area. The most important ones of these were:

- Archbishopric of Cologne
- Prince-Bishopric of Liège
- Bishopric of Utrecht
- Bishopric of Cambrai
- Duchy of Limburg
- County of Guelders (includes also the shire Teisterbant)
- Margravate of Ename, later called Imperial Flanders or the County of Aalst
- County of Jülich
- County of Namur
- County of Cleves
- County of Hainault, including the Margravate of Valenciennes and the County of Bergen
- County of Holland
- County of Berg
- County of Loon
- County of Horne

The following successor states remained under the authority of the titular dukes of Lower Lotharingia (Lothier):

- Margraviate of Antwerp
- County of Leuven and Brussels
- Duchy of Brabant

== See also ==
- List of rulers of Lorraine
- Austrasia
- Ripuaria

== Sources ==
- Fanning, Steven; Bachrach, Bernard S., eds. (2004). The Annals of Flodoard of Reims, 916-966. Toronto: Broadview Press.
- MacLean, Simon (2013). "Shadow Kingdom: Lotharingia and the Frankish World, c. 850–c. 1050". History Compass. 11 (6): 443–457.
- McKitterick, Rosamond (1983). The Frankish Kingdoms Under the Carolingians, 751-987. Harlow: Longman.
- Nelson, Janet L., ed. (1991). The Annals of St-Bertin. Manchester: Manchester University Press.
- Pernot, François (2014). "L'Europe «lotharingienne», une idée géopolitique IXe-XXIe siècles". Revue de géographie historique. 4: 3–23.
- Reuter, Timothy, ed. (1992). The Annals of Fulda. Manchester and New York: Manchester University Press.
- Reuter, Timothy (2013) [1991]. Germany in the Early Middle Ages c. 800–1056. London and New York: Routledge.
- Schneider, Jens (2010). Auf der Suche nach dem verlorenen Reich: Lotharingien im 9. und 10. Jahrhundert. Köln: Böhlau Verlag.
- Scholz, Bernhard Walter; Rogers, Barbara, eds. (1970). Carolingian Chronicles: Royal Frankish Annals and Nithard's Histories. Ann Arbor: University of Michigan Press.
- Springer, Matthias (2003), "Ribuarier", in Beck, Heinrich; Geuenich, Dieter; Steuer, Heiko (eds.), Reallexikon der Germanischen Altertumskunde, vol. 24 (2 ed.), De Gruyter, pp. 569–574, ISBN 978-3-11-017575-2
- West, Charles (2023). The Fall of a Carolingian Kingdom: Lotharingia, 855–869. Toronto: University of Toronto Press.
