= Henry III of Louvain =

Count of Louvain from 1078 to 1095

Henry III
- Landgrave of Brabant; Count of Louvain; Count of Brussels
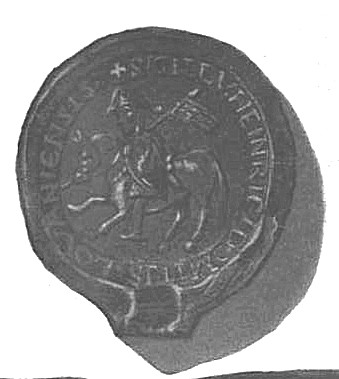
- Died: 1095; Tournai
- Noble family: House of Reginar
- Spouse: Gertrude of Flanders
- Issue: Adelaide of Louvain; Gertrude and others
- Father: Henry II, Count of Louvain
- Mother: Adela of Orthen

Henry III of Louvain (German: Heinrich, Dutch: Hendrik, French: Henri; died 1095), was Count of Louvain (Leuven) and Landgrave of Brabant, son of Henry II (c. 1020–1078), Count of Louvain and Brussels, and Adela of Orthen (or Betuwe), a daughter of Count Everard of Orthen.

== Life ==
At his father Henry's death 1078 he became Count of Louvain.

He was allied by family marriages to most of the nearby lords: he was brother-in-law of Baldwin II of Hainaut, and son-in-law of Robert I of Flanders. The bishop of Liège, Henri I of Verdun, was peace-loving. Henry was able to concentrate on the internal affairs of his lands, without external threats. He supported religious foundations in the western parts, and legislated to reduce lawlessness.

After the death on 20 September 1085 of Hermann II, count palatine of Lotharingia, he became landgrave of Brabant, which was an imperial fief between the Dender and the Zenne.

In July 1095, he took part in a tournament in Tournai. Fighting in a joust against Gosuin de Forest, he was mortally wounded.

== Family ==
About 1090 he married Gertrude of Flanders (1080–1117), daughter of Robert I of Flanders and Gertrude of Saxony.

A genealogy of the time attributes to him four daughters (not named). Since he was succeeded by his brother Godfrey I of Leuven, it is inferred that he did not leave a son as heir. It has been suggested that the daughters included:

- Adelaide, wife of duke Simon I of Lorraine
- Gertrude, wife to Lambert, count of Montaigu and Clermont.

Gertrude of Flanders, widowed, married in 1096 duke Theodoric II of Lorraine (died 1115) and was mother of Thierry of Alsace ("Theodoric").

== Ancestry ==
Ancestors of Henry III of Louvain

Reginar III, Count of Hainaut (c. 920 – 973)
Lambert I of Louvain (c. 950 – 1015)
Adela
Lambert II, Count of Louvain (d. 1054)
Charles, Duke of Lower Lorraine (953–993)
Gerberga of Lower Lorraine (c. 980 – 1018)
Adelaide
Henry II, Count of Louvain (c. 1020–1078)
Godfrey I, Count of Verdun (House of Ardennes-Verdun) (d. 1002); Margrave of Antwerp and Ename, count of Hainault
Gothelo I, Duke of Lorraine (c. 967 – 1044)
Matilda Billung of Saxony (c. 940 – 1008)
Oda of Verdun (Lorraine)
Henry III of Leuven landgrave of Brabant, Count of Louvain
Count Everard of Orthen
Adèle of Orthen (Verdun)

== See also ==
- Dukes of Brabant family tree
- Chronique des Ducs de Brabant, Adrian van Baerland, Antwerp (1612).

== Sources ==
- Oksanen, Eljas (2012). Flanders and the Anglo-Norman World, 1066-1216. Cambridge University Press.
- Ruffini-Ronzani, Nicolas (2020). Church, Stephen D. (ed.). "The Counts of Louvain and the Anglo-Norman World, c.1100-c.1215". Anglo-Norman Studies XLII: Proceedings of the Battle Conference 2019. The Boydell Press.

Regnal titles
Preceded by Hermann II	Landgrave of Brabant; 1085–1095	Succeeded by Godfrey I
Preceded by Henry II	Count of Louvain; 1078–1095	Succeeded by Godfrey I
