= Counts of Louvain =

Former country

Coat of arms of the Counts of Louvain

The Counts of Louvain were a branch of the Lotharingian House of Reginar which from the late 10th century ruled over the estates of Louvain (French) or Leuven (Dutch) in Lower Lorraine.

== History ==
The likely ancestor of the Reginars, Gilbert, Count of the Maasgau, a vassal of the West Frankish king Charles the Bald, married a daughter of the Carolingian emperor Lothair I in 846. Reginar I "longneck", possibly his son, was the most powerful noble in the now kingless kingdom of Lotharingia (Lorraine), in the period from 910 to 915. His son and successor Gilbert swore fealty to the East Frankish king Henry the Fowler in 925 and three years later married his daughter Gerberga of Saxony. His younger brother's son Reginar III held lands in the region of Mons.

About 990, Lambert the Bearded (d. 1015), son of Count Reginar III, married Gerberga, daughter of the Carolingian duke Charles of Lower Lorraine, and by 1003 he was being described as a Count of Louvain. His county, with its original capital of Louvain built upon the Dyle river, between the old Pagus of Brabant and Pagus of Hasbania, rapidly increased in size and power. In 1013, Lambert annexed part of the county of Bruningrode, located between Louvain and Tienen, and this became a source of long-running conflict with the prince-bishops of Liège.

Lambert's family gained great influence in the Holy Roman Empire, acquiring more comital titles over time. His son Lambert II is also mentioned as a count of Brussels, where he had the St. Michael's Church erected to house the relics of Saint Gudula. When he joined the rebellion of Count Baldwin V of Flanders against Emperor Henry III, he was killed in a 1054 battle at Tournai.

Lambert's grandson, Count Henry III of Louvain was vested with the title of a Landgrave of Brabant upon the death of the Ezzonid count palatine Hermann II of Lotharingia in 1085.

In the early 12th century, Henry III was succeeded by his brother Godfrey I, who was entrusted with the imperial Dukedom of Lower Lotharingia, and Margraviate of Antwerp after Henry of Limbourg fell out of favour. Although the title was later given back to the lords of Limbourg-sur-Vesdre, Godefrey and his family refused to stop using the title, and kept possession of Antwerp. The ensuing conflict between the families led to the eventual abolishment of the Duchy, and the two families came to be known as the Dukes of Brabant and Limbourg respectively.

== Counts of Louvain and Brussels ==
- 1003–1015: Lambert I, was the first Count of Louvain, son of Reginar III Count of Hainaut
- 1015–1038: Henry I, (son of Lambert I)
- 1038–1040: Otto
- 1040–1054: Lambert II, (son of Lambert I)
- 1054–1079: Henry II, (son of Lambert II)
- 1079–1086: Henry III, (son of Henry II)

== Counts of Louvain and Brussels, Landgraves of Brabant ==
- 1086–1095: Henry III, (son of Henry II)
- 1095–1106: Godfrey I, (son of Henry II)

== Counts of Louvain and Brussels, Landgraves of Brabant, Dukes of Lower-Lorraine ==
- 1106–1128: Godfrey I, (son of Henry II)
- 1128–1141: Godfrey II, (son of Godfrey I)
- 1141–1190: Godfrey III, (son of Godrey II)

From 1183 onwards, the titles of Count of Louvain, Count of Brussels and Landgrave of Brabant were merged in the title of Duke of Brabant and used as appanages.
