= Godfrey II =

Godfrey II may refer to:

- Godfrey II, Duke of Lower Lorraine (965–1023)
- Godfrey II, Count of Louvain (ca. 1110 – 13 June 1142)
