= Waleran I of Limburg =

Count of Limburg

Waleran (or Walram) II of Arlon (died 1082), supposedly also called Udon of Limburg, was the count of Arlon from 1052 and, if he was the same person as Udon, also count of Limburg from 1065 and advocatus of the Abbey of Sint-Truiden. He was the younger son of Waleran I, Count of Arlon, and his wife Adelaide. His elder brother Fulk became Count of Arlon.

The evidence for the origins and details of his family are incomplete. In 2007 Jean-Louis Kupper proposed that Udo and Walram II are probably two different people, who were both succeeded by Henry, count of Limbourg, who later became Duke of Lower Lotharingia. Some key facts for the two men would be as follows, according to Kupper:

- Udon, Count of Limburg: In 1064 comes Udo de Lemburc made a benefaction to the church of St Adalbert in Aachen. In 1065, the year that Frederick, Duke of Lower Lorraine died, Udone was named by Bishop Alberon III of Metz as his brother Frederick's successor as advocatus of the Abbey in St Truiden. In 1078 the necrologium of Prüm abbey mentions the decease of a Count Udon. In summary, Udon must therefore have been the brother or husband of Jutta (Judith) who was said to be the mother of Count Henry, and daughter of Frederick, Duke of Lower Lorraine.
- Waleran II, Count of Arlon (not count of Limburg): Contemporary records mention him between 1052 (when his parents were still alive) and 1084/5 (long after the apparent death of Udon). Several medieval narrative sources also name Waleran and his brother Fulk as sons of Countess Adelaide of Arlon, and state that the wife of Henry of Limburg was a daughter or granddaughter of Adelaide, and thus the sister or, more likely, the daughter of one of the brothers, Waleran II, or Fulk. Waleran's mother Adelaide was a member of the house of Ardennes, then ruling in Upper Lorraine. She was the daughter of Duke Theodoric I, and sister of Frederick II, Duke of Upper Lorraine.

Count Henry of Limburg, inherited Limburg from his mother, but according to Kupper there is no evidence that he ever held Arlon. It was inherited by his son Waleran, Duke of Lower Lorraine, who was also known as Paganus, by 1115, when Henry (who died about 1118) was still alive. According to Kupper, this is a sign that Waleran-Paganus had inherited from his mother rather than his father, in contrast to the lordship of Limburg, and the advocacy of St Truiden, which had been his father's.

== Also see ==
- Loud, Graham A.; Schenk, Jochen, eds. (2017). The Origins of the German Principalities, 1100-1350: Essays by German Historians. Routledge.

Regnal titles
New title	Count of Limburg; 1065–1082	Succeeded by Henry I
