= Godfrey I of Louvain =

Count of Louvain (c. 1060–1139)

Godfrey I
- Duke of Lower Lorraine; Landgrave of Brabant; Count of Louvain; Count of Brussels
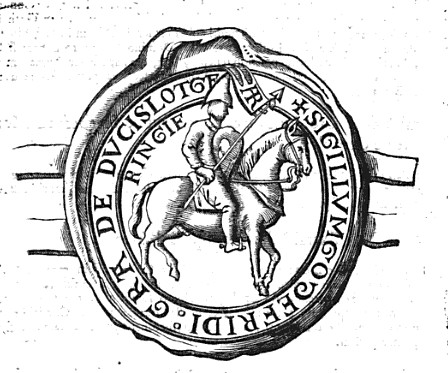
- Effigy of Godfrey on his seal
- Born: 1060
- Died: 25 January 1139 (aged 79)
- Buried: Affligem Abbey
- Noble family: Reginar
- Spouses: Ida of Chiny; Clementia of Bourgogne
- Issue: Adeliza, Queen of England; Godfrey II of Louvain; Clarissa; Henry; Ida; Joceline of Louvain
- Father: Henry II, Count of Louvain
- Mother: Adèle of Orthen (Verdun)

Godfrey I (Dutch: Godfried, c. 1060 – 25 January 1139), called the Bearded, the Courageous, or the Great, was the Landgrave of Brabant, Count of Brussels and Leuven (Louvain) from 1095 to his death and Duke of Lower Lorraine from 1106 to 1129. He was also Margrave of Antwerp from 1106 to his death.

== Biography ==
Godfrey was the son of Henry II (c. 1020–1078) and Adela of Orthen (or Betuwe), a daughter of Count Everard of Orthen. He succeeded his brother Henry III who died wounded in a tournament in 1095, and only had young daughters.

He first came into conflict in 1096 with Otbert, Bishop of Liège, over the county of Brunengeruz that both claimed. In 1099, Emperor Henry IV allotted the county to the bishop, who entrusted it to Albert III, Count of Namur. Godfrey arbitrated a dispute between Counts Henry III of Luxembourg and Arnold I of Loon, over the appointment of the abbot of Sint-Truiden.

Godfrey was in favour with the emperor and defended his interests in Lorraine. In 1102, he stopped Count Robert II of Flanders "the Crusader", who was invading the Cambraisis. After the death of the emperor in 1106, his son and successor, Henry V, who had been in rebellion, decided to avenge himself on his father's partisans. Duke Henry of Lower Lorraine was imprisoned and his duchy confiscated and given to Godfrey. After Henry escaped from prison, he tried to retake his duchy and captured Aachen, but ultimately failed.

In 1114, during a rift between the emperor and Pope Paschal II, Godfrey led a revolt in Germany. In 1118, the emperor and the duke were reconciled. In 1119, Baldwin VII of Flanders died heirless and Flanders was contested between several claimants, one of whom, William of Ypres, had married a niece of Godfrey's second wife. Godfrey supported William, but could not enforce his claim against that of Charles the Good. Also dead in that year was Otbert. Two separate men were elected to replace him and Godfrey again sided with the loser.

By marrying his daughter Adeliza to Henry I of England, who was also the father-in-law of the emperor, he greatly increased his prestige. However, Henry V died in 1125 and Godfrey supported Conrad of Hohenstaufen, the duke of Franconia, against Lothair of Supplinburg. Lothair was elected. In 1128 Lothair withdrew the duchy of Lower Lorraine and granted it to Waleran of Limburg, the son of Henry, whom Henry V had deprived in 1106. The next year, Godfrey was defeated by Waleran and Bishop Alexander of Liège at the Battle of Wilderen, further weakening him. Nonetheless, Godfrey maintained the margraviate of Antwerp and retained the ducal title (which would in 1183 become duke of Brabant).

After the assassination of Charles the Good in 1127, the Flemish succession was again in dispute. William Clito prevailed, but was soon fraught with revolts. Godfrey intervened on behalf of Theodoric of Alsace, who prevailed against Clito. Godfrey continued to war against Liège and Namur.

Godfrey spent his last years in the abbey of Affligem. He died of old age on 25 January 1139 and was buried in the left aisle of the abbey church. He is sometimes said to have passed in 1140, but this is an error.

== Family and children ==
Godfrey married Ida (1078–1117), daughter of Count Otto II of Chiny, (c. 1065 – after 1131) and Adelaide of Namur. They had several children:

- Adeliza of Louvain (b. 1103 – d. abbey of Affligem, 23 April 1151) married Henry I, King of England and later William d'Aubigny, 1st Earl of Arundel (1109 – before 1151).
- Godfrey II of Louvain (b. 1107 – d. 13 June 1142), duke of Lower Lorraine, landgrave of Brabant, count of Brussels and Louvain. He married Lutgardis of Sulzbach (d.a. 1163), daughter of Berenger I of Sulzbach.
- Clarissa (d. 1140).
- Henry (d. in the abbey of Affligem, 1141), monk.
- Ida (d. 1162) married to Arnold I, Count of Cleves (d. 1147).

Later, he married Clementia (c. 1078 – c. 1133), daughter of Count William I of Burgundy and widow of Count Robert II of Flanders. They had no children.

By an unknown mistress he had one son, Joscelin of Louvain, who married Agnes de Percy and had issue.

== See also ==
- Dukes of Brabant family tree
- Chronique des Ducs de Brabant, Adrian van Baerland, Antwerp (1612).

Regnal titles
Preceded by Henry III	Count of Louvain; Landgrave of Brabant; 1095–1139	Succeeded by Godfrey II
Preceded by Henry	Margrave of Antwerp; 1106–1139	Succeeded by Godfrey II
Preceded by Henry	Duke of Lower Lorraine; 1106–1128	Succeeded by Walram
