= Adeliza of Louvain =

Queen of England from 1121 to 1135

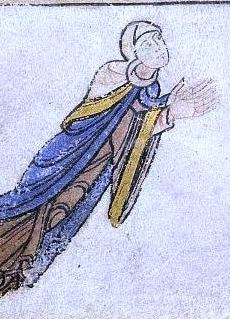
- Detail of a Shaftesbury manuscript, most likely depicting Adeliza

Queen consort of England
- Tenure: 24 January 1121 – 1 December 1135
- Coronation: 30 January 1121
- Born: c. 1103
- Died: March/April 1151 (aged c. 48); Affligem Abbey, Brabant
- Burial: Reading Abbey or Affligem Abbey, Brabant
- Spouses: Henry I of England (m. 1121; died 1135) William d'Aubigny, 1st Earl of Arundel (m. 1138)
- Issue more...: William d'Aubigny, 2nd Earl of Arundel
- House: Reginar
- Father: Godfrey I, Count of Louvain
- Mother: Ida of Chiny

Adeliza of Louvain (also Adelicia, Adela, Adelais, and Aleidis; c. 1103 – March/April 1151) was Queen of England from 1121 to 1135 as the second wife of King Henry I.

Adeliza was the eldest child of Godfrey I, Count of Louvain, and Ida of Chiny. In 1121, aged about 18, Adeliza was married to Henry, who was around 54 years of age. Henry's only legitimate son, William Adelin, had died in 1120, which had prompted Henry to marry again. He hoped to have another son with Adeliza and spent much of his time with her. She seems to have been influential in the promotion of French poetry and other arts at court, but played little part in politics. Though otherwise successful, their marriage produced no children, and Henry decided to leave the throne to his daughter Empress Matilda. Adeliza was among those who swore to support her stepdaughter and did so during her struggle against Henry's nephew Stephen of Blois, who took the throne after Henry's death in 1135.

As queen dowager, Adeliza spent three years living in a convent. In 1138, she married again to William d'Aubigny, 1st Earl of Arundel, by whom she had seven children. In 1150, she left her husband to move to the Affligem Abbey in Brabant, where she died the following year.

== Early life and family ==
Adeliza was renowned for her beauty, reflected in the epithet 'the fair maiden of Brabant'. The chronicler Henry of Huntingdon also mentions Adeliza's beauty in an interlude in his Historia Anglorum, stating, "A jewel grows pale on you, a crown does not shine. Put adornment aside, for nature provides your adornment..."

Adeliza's father was Godfrey I, Count of Louvain (1095–1139), Landgrave of Brabant, and Duke of Lower Lotharingia (1106–1128), an ally of Henry V, Holy Roman Emperor. After the death of Adeliza's mother, Ida of Chiny, Godfrey married Clementia of Burgundy, the mother of Baldwin VII, Count of Flanders, who had fought with the French against the Normans in 1118. Adeliza's illegitimate brother, Joscelin of Louvain, married the heiress to the Percy fortune. He is often referred to as an "opportunist".

== Queenship ==
Plans for Adeliza's marriage to Henry I of England may have begun when she was as young as sixteen, even before Henry's only legitimate son, William Adelin, died on 25 November 1120 in the White Ship disaster. However, Henry's need for a new male heir expedited the marriage plans and the couple wed on 24 January 1121. Apparently in addition to her beauty, Henry was also attracted to Adeliza as a wife because she was a descendant of Charlemagne. It is thought that Henry's only surviving legitimate child Empress Matilda, from his first wife Matilda of Scotland, may have been involved in arranging his second marriage, due to the fact that she was with him near the time that it was being negotiated. Henry of Huntingdon mentions the royal couple in his Historia Anglorum, stating that the new queen accompanied Henry to London at Whitsun (that is, 29 May 1121). Adeliza appears to have travelled extensively with Henry, probably to increase the chances of her conception. Despite their close contact, however, Adeliza and Henry never produced a child.

There is a possibility that Adeliza prayed to St. Romanus to aid her in conceiving a child; St. Romanus, according to legend, was 'born to parents miraculously cured of infertility', and in 1124, there was a double viewing of the relics of St. Romanus at Rouen Cathedral. We know about this from the Archives départementales de la Seine-Maritime G 3666 (more simply referred to as the G 3666), and Adeliza was certainly present in Rouen while the relics were present.

Unlike Henry's first wife Matilda, Adeliza appears to have played a very passive role in the administration of the kingdom. While Matilda issued some thirty-one charters and writs during her queenship, during Adeliza's fifteen-year marriage to Henry I she issued one, and she only attested 13 of Henry's many charters, even though they were almost always together.

=== Role as artistic patron ===
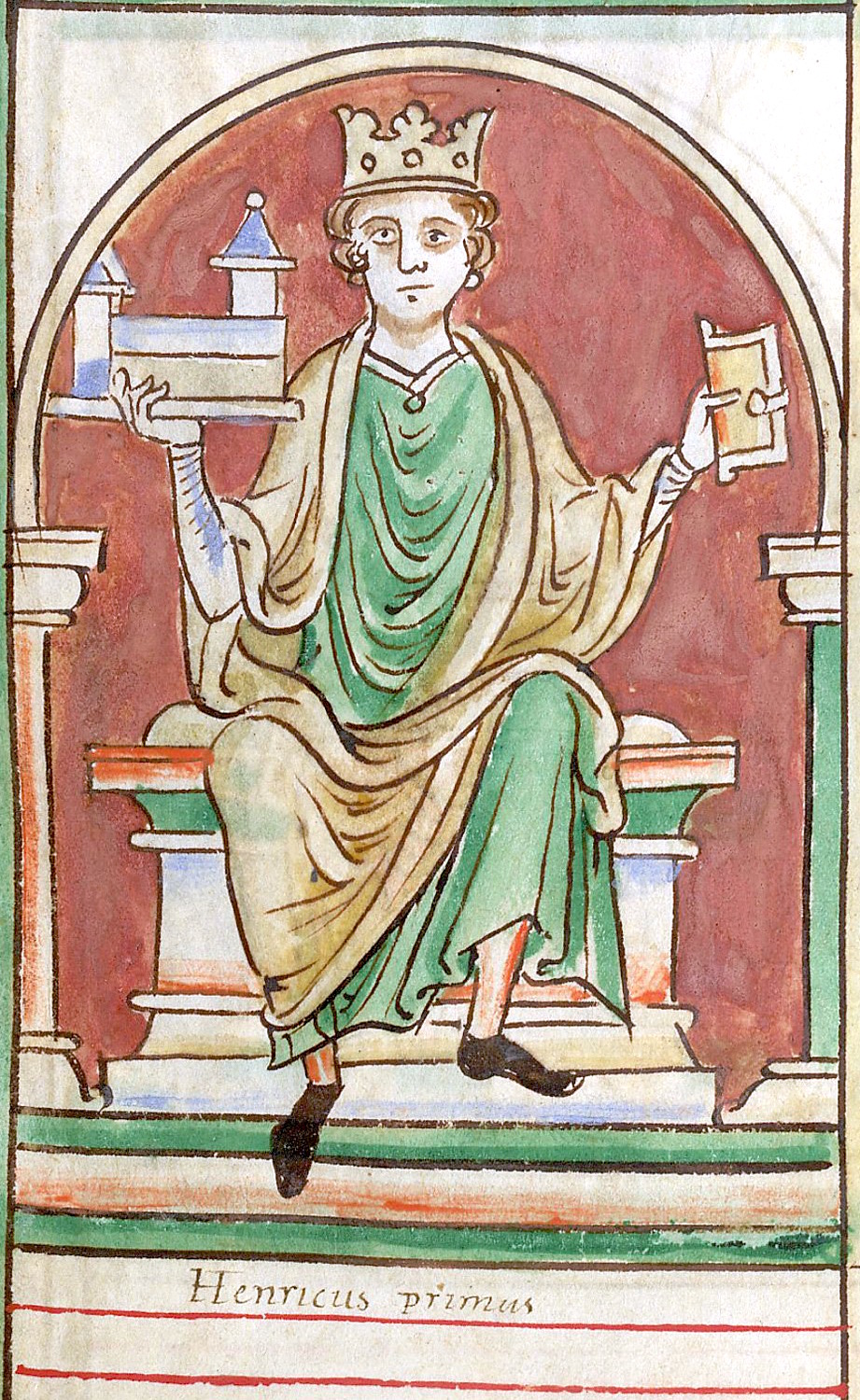
King Henry I holding Reading Abbey, where he was buried.

Despite her limited involvement in politics, Adeliza seems to have played an active role as a patron of the arts and literature, and was influential in fostering the rise of French poetry in the English court. While English queens had been traditionally associated with artistic patronage for decades, and a number of them, including Edith of Wessex, Emma of Normandy and Matilda, had financed a number of works in different media, Adeliza primarily sponsored books written in French. At the time, secular books in the French or Anglo-Norman vernacular were extremely popular, a trend given impetus by wealthy aristocratic women like Adeliza. Philippe de Thaon, an Anglo-Norman poet, dedicated his zoological treatise known as the Bestiary to the queen:

Philippe de Thaon Has distilled into a French treatise
The Bestiary, A book in Latin,
For the honour of a jewel Who is an outstandingly beautiful woman.
And she is courtly and wise, Of good customs and generous:
She is called 'Aaliz', Queen is she crowned,
She is the queen of England; May her soul never know trouble!
Listen to what we find About her name in Hebrew:
"Aaliz" is her name; "Praise of God" is
In Hebrew truly "Aaliz", laus of God.
I do not dare give further praise, Lest envy take me,
But so that she may be remembered And praised forever more
I wish to compose this book; May God be present at its beginning!

The Bestiary would have been amply illustrated, and was intended to be read page by page, not all at once, like a poem. Many other works that Adeliza commissioned were similar in structure to the Bestiary, including the now lost Life of King Henry by David.

== Widowhood and remarriage ==
When Henry died on 1 December 1135, Adeliza retired temporarily to the Benedictine convent of Wilton Abbey near Salisbury. She was present at the dedication of Henry's tomb at Reading Abbey on the first anniversary of his death. At about that time, she founded a leper hospital dedicated to Saint Giles at Fugglestone St Peter, Wiltshire.

In 1138, three years after Henry I's death, Adeliza married William d'Aubigny, 1st Earl of Arundel, one of Henry I's advisors, and son of Guillaume d’Aubigny and Maud le Bigod. Together, they lived at her castle of Arundel on the Sussex coast and had seven children. Their names were (by order of birth), Alice, William, Olivia, Reynor, Geoffrey, Henry, and Agatha.

=== Relationship with Matilda ===
Although not a great deal is known about Adeliza's relationship with her stepdaughter, it is known she was present at the ceremony when Henry officially named Matilda as his heir presumptive, since the chronicler John of Worcester states that the Queen "swore [an oath] for the king's daughter... and agreed ... that if the king did not have an heir of either sex [......], but ... did not lack a survivor of each sex, then the survivor should inherit the kingdom.'" After her second marriage, Adeliza received Matilda at her home in Arundel, along with Matilda's half-brother Robert, 1st Earl of Gloucester, in defiance of the wishes of her second husband, who was a staunch supporter of King Stephen. She later betrayed them and handed them over when King Stephen besieged the castle. Trying to explain Adeliza's actions, John of Worcester suggests that "she feared the king's majesty and worried that she might lose the great estate she held throughout England". He also mentions Adeliza's excuse to King Stephen: "She swore on oath that his enemies had not come to England on her account but that she had simply given them hospitality as persons of high dignity once close to her." In the end, King Stephen yielded to an appeal from Adeliza and permitted Matilda to depart and join her half-brother Robert at Bristol.

== Landholdings ==
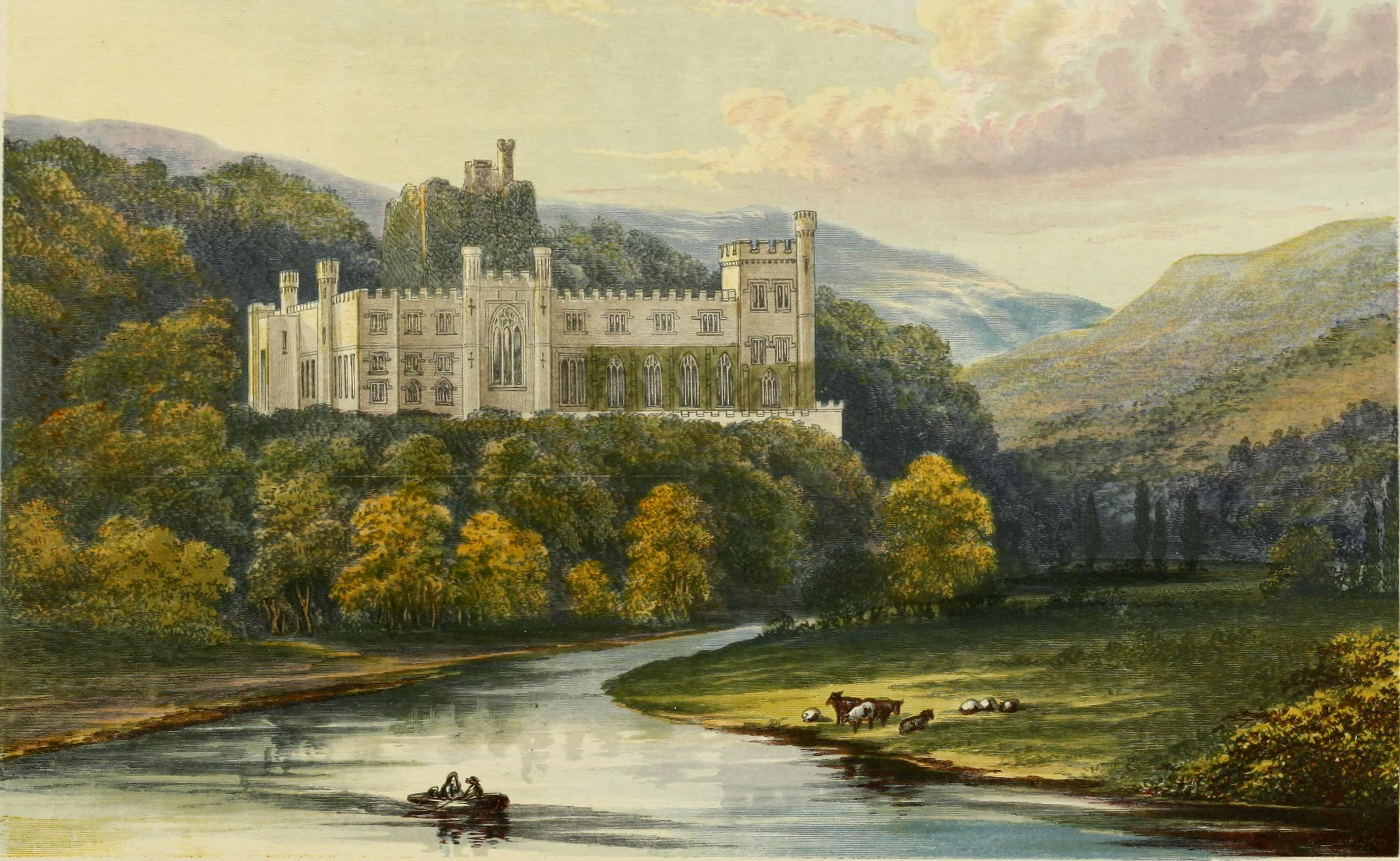
Arundel Castle

Adeliza was given the revenues of Rutland, Shropshire and a large district of London, with possession of the city of Chichester. Henry also gave the manor of Aston to Adeliza "as his queen and wife". Landholdings that were part of Adeliza of Louvain's estate included Waltham Abbey in Essex, and properties in Hertfordshire, Bedfordshire, Buckinghamshire, Berkshire, Middlesex, and Devon. As a gift from Henry I, she was given a property in Ashleworth, a component of the royal estate of Berkeley. In 1126 the whole county of Shropshire was given to her, even though it is not listed in the Pipe Roll.

Adeliza gave her brother Joscelin a large estate in Sussex called Petworth that was dependent on her castle of Arundel; much of the estate is still owned by his descendants, the Egremonts. Henry also gave Adeliza lands that had previously been Matilda's including Waltham and Queenhithe. She had estates in Essex, Hertfordshire, Bedfordshire, Middlesex, Gloucestershire, and Devon. Her husband then granted her exemption from tax for those lands. In additions to those gifts, she was given a portion of the royal estate at Berkeley, and the county of Shropshire.

After Henry died, Adeliza continued to exercise jurisdiction over her lands, retaining some of her property until 1150. In 1136, she endowed Reading Abbey with one hundred shillings a year from the revenues of Queenhithe. On the first anniversary of Henry I's death, Adeliza gave the manor of Aston to the Abbey of Reading, and endowed them with lands "to provide for the convent and other religious pweaona [sic] coming to the abbey on the occasion of the anniversary of my lord King Henry." She added the gift of a church a few years later.

== Later years ==
In the last years of her life, Adeliza appears to have faded into obscurity. In 1150, Adeliza left William to enter the monastery of Affligem in Flanders. At least one of her brothers was also living at this monastery. The annals at the monastery are the only source to mention her death in 1151, and her burial site is unknown. Some traditions imply she was buried at the monastery, but a donation made by her brother Joscelin to Reading Abbey seems to suggest she was buried there with Henry I. Alison Weir disputes that she became a nun in her final years in her book Queens of the Conquest stating that Adeliza may have died in childbirth at Affligem and that her heart and viscera were initially buried there while her body was taken back to England.

== Notes ==
Adeliza of Louvain House of Leuven Born: 1103 Died: 23 April 1151
English royalty
Vacant Title last held by Matilda of Scotland	Queen consort of the English; 24 January 1121 – 1 December 1135	Vacant Title next held by Matilda I of Boulogne
