= Pagus of Brabant =

Historical region of Belgium

Coordinates: 50.75°N 03.99°E

The pagus of Brabant (Latin: Pagus Bracbantensis; Dutch: Brabantgouw) was a geographical region in the early Middle Ages, located in what is now Belgium. It was the first region known to have been called Brabant, and it included the modern capital of Belgium, Brussels. It was divided between the neighbouring counties of Flanders, Hainaut and Louvain (Leuven) in the eleventh century. It was the eastern part, which went to the Counts of Louvain, which kept the name in use, becoming the primary name of their much larger lordship. This led to other regions later being named Brabant – in particular, the French and Dutch-speaking areas east of the Dyle, including Leuven and Wavre, which are still in provinces known as "Brabant"; and secondly the province of North Brabant in the Netherlands.

The area of the old pagus of Brabant is and was multi-lingual, divided between Dutch (Flemish) speakers in the north, and French (including Picard) speakers in the south. Today the region includes not only bi-lingual Brussels, but also parts of the modern Dutch-speaking Belgian provinces of Flemish Brabant and East Flanders, and the French-speaking provinces of Hainaut and Walloon Brabant.

== Geographical definition ==
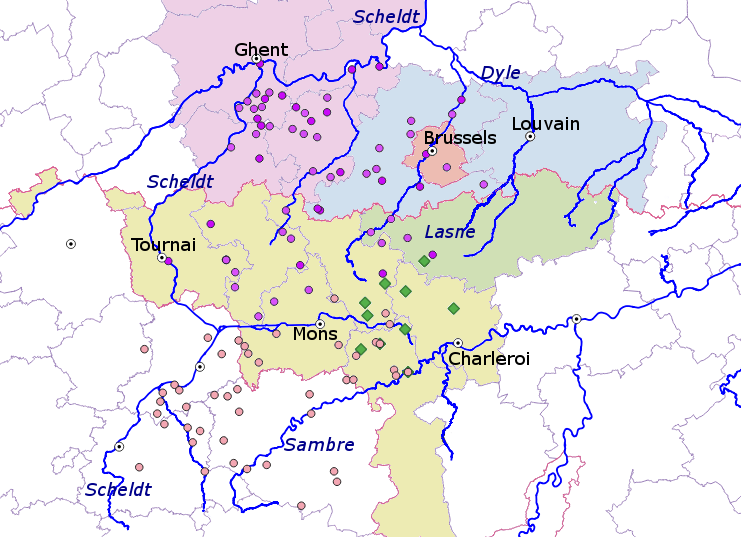
The medieval pagi of Hainaut (pink dots) and Brabant (purple dots) are compared to the modern provinces of Belgium. Blue is modern Flemish Brabant; Green is modern Walloon Brabant; but much of early medieval Brabant is now in East Flanders (mauve) and Hainaut (yellow). The green markers were in the Silva Carbonaria.

In its oldest known forms, Brabant lay between the rivers Scheldt, Rupel, Dyle, Lasne and Haine.

This means the territory included not only Brussels but also much of what is now modern Hainaut and Eastern Flanders, including Aalst. Louvain and Wavre, which later came to be seen as part of Brabant, were originally just outside the pagus of Brabant – both in the pagus of Hasbania.

The modern Dutch province of North Brabant was not originally part of Brabant but acquired the name because it was later integrated politically.

In the modern Belgian province of Antwerp, Klein-Brabant is geographically in the original pagus of Brabant.

== Etymology ==
In its earliest forms such as those collected by Nonn, the first part of the name was written with variants such as brac-, brag-, brach-, braim, and brei. According to Deru, this element could derive from Proto-Germanic *brakti implying fallow land, or *braki implying marshy land (related to modern Dutch broek). These are both believed to be derived from *brekaną a reconstructed Proto-Germanic word meaning 'to break'.

The second element of the name -bant is found in several other Frankish pagus names in this region, such as nearby Oosterbant, and Swifterbant and Teisterbant, to the north, and is believed to be connected to the medieval concept of a "ban", relating to areas of duty and authority.

== Pre-history ==
As demonstrated by Deru, the pagus of Brabant between the Scheldt, Haine, Lasne and Rupel rivers, corresponds closely with the northern extension of the Nervii, a Belgic tribe, both in terms of archaeological evidence such as Nervian coin finds, and also because it lay within the Roman-era civitas of the Nervians, and its successor, the medieval bishopric of Cambrai - both of which had their main centres in the south, in the areas of Hainaut and Cambrai.

== History ==
The oldest records of Brabant come from the Liber Traditionem of Saint Peter's Abbey in Ghent, beginning around 750. Though it was on the opposite side of the Scheldt from Brabant, St Peter's had a strong involvement in lands between the Scheldt and Dender.

In 870, in the Treaty of Meerssen Brabant was mentioned as containing four counties (in Bracbanto comitatus IIII), but the definitions of these political entities can now only be speculated upon. Much of its history in the Early Middle Ages (before 1000) is difficult to reconstruct. Although Leon Vanderkindere (in 1901) and Paul Bonenfant (in 1935) both attempted it, these attempts have been criticized by later historians. What can be said is limited:

- There was a count named John in 978, who had a county, itself called Brabant, which included Sint-Kwintens-Lennik. Vanderkindere equated him with one or two other Johns, not described as count, mentioned in a 966 record of benefices made to Nivelles Abbey, and granting land at Lupoigne and Tongrines.
- Among places named as being within a county, not just a pagus, named Brabant were Gooik and Lennik (877 and 897). Possibly also Wambeek, Tubize and Ittre (see Nonn note 494); Meslin-l'Evéque and Lessines, both near Ath (946); Dikkele (991). That John's county may have been so widespread has been taken by de Waha to suggest that his county encompassed the whole pagus.
- There was a county within western Brabant named Biest (Bisuth, Bisit), which included places between Oudenaarde and Aalst: Herzele and Walsegem. This was the part of Brabant which would later come under Flemish control, and is still part of East Flanders province. It was named in only two texts, in 971 and 1011, and no count of Biest was named.
- There was a count named Egbert associated with Chièvres around 1010 (wrongly dated by Vanderkindere according to de Waha). This was in the southern, Romance-speaking, part of Brabant which would later come under Hainaut control.

After 925 the boundary between the major Frankish kingdoms became permanently fixed along the Scheldt river, making Brabant a frontier province or "March" of what would become the Holy Roman Empire, and eventually Germany. On the western side of that boundary lay the expansionist Counts of Flanders, who were within the western Frankish kingdom that would become France. They developed the fortified city of Ghent upon this river frontier.

In response to this situation, the emperors in Germany established their own March on their side of the Scheldt. One of the first frontier lordships named was at Ename in Brabant, and there were also Valenciennes to the south and Antwerp to the north.

As the 11th century progressed, three large parts of Brabant became permanently politically connected to their powerful neighbours.

- The western part of Brabant, including Aalst and stretching from the Scheldt to the Dender, became part of the Flanders, making the lords of Flanders major land-holders in the Holy Roman Empire. This is referred to as "Imperial Flanders" in contrast to "Crown Flanders" (under the French king).
- The southeastern part of Brabant came under the control of the County of Hainaut.
- An eastern part of Brabant including Brussels became a lordship of the Counts of Leuven, who then referred to themselves as Counts of both Leuven and Brussels.

The remaining part of Brabant between Brussels and the Flemish part of Brabant also came into the hands of the counts of Leuven and Brussels at some point, and from at least 1085 they referred to themselves also as the Landgraves of Brabant, indicating a higher status than a normal Count. Van Droogenbroeck has argued that the counts of Leuven acquired this title to Brabant only after their relative Hermann II, Count Palatine of Lotharingia died in 1085.

== Bibliography ==
- Bonenfant, Paul (1935), "Le pagus de Brabant", Bulletin de la Société belge d'études géographiques, 5: 25–78
- Deru, Xavier (2009), "Cadres géographiques du territoire des Nerviens", Revue du Nord, 5 (383): 179–201, doi:10.3917/rdn.383.0179, ISSN 0035-2624
- Van Droogenbroeck, Frans Jozef (2007), "Het landgraafschap Brabant (1085-1183), de territoriale en institutionele aanloop tot het ontstaan van het hertogdom Brabant", De Hertog en de Staten, de Kanselier en de Raad, de Rekenkamer, het Leenhof, de Algemene Ontvangerij, de Drossaard en de Woudmeester, het Notariaat en het Landgraafschap Brabant : Acht bijdragen tot de studie van de instellingen in het Hertogdom Brabant in de Middeleeuwen en de Nieuwe Tijd
- Faider-Feytmans, Germaine (1952), "Les limites de la cité des Nerviens", L'Antiquité classique, 21 (2): 338–358, doi:10.3406/antiq.1952.3453
- Nonn, Ulrich (1983), Pagus und Comitatus
- de Waha, Michel (1998), "Du pagus de Brabant au comté de Hainaut: Eléments pour servir à l'histoire de la construction de la principauté", Colloque de Soignies, La Charte-loi de Soignies et son environnement, 1142, Annales du Cercle Royal d’Histoire et d’Archéologie du Canton de Soignies, XXXVI, pp. 25–111
- Vanderkindere, Léon (1902), "Chapter 9", La formation territoriale des principautés belges au Moyen Age (PDF), vol. 2, p. 128
