= Hispanic Monarchy =

Hispanic Monarchy and Spanish Monarchy may refer to:

- the 1479-1716 period of the Spanish Empire (Hispanic Monarchy (Political entity)) that is divided in:
  - Habsburg Spain
  - Iberian Union
- the Monarchy of Spain
