= Duke of Lothier =

European title of nobility

The Duke of Lothier was purely an honorific title. It is often associated with the territory within the Duchy of Lower Lotharingia, governed by the dukes of Brabant and their successors after 1190 until the end of the Ancien Régime in 1796.

In 1190, at the Diet of Hall in the abbey of Comburg, the Roman Emperor Henry VI decided that the duke of Lower Lotharingia, at that moment Henry I of Brabant, would only have ducal authority within his own Lotharingian territories (the county of Leuven) and his imperial fiefs (the Margraviate of Antwerp, the Landgraviate of Brabant and the domain of the abbey of Nivelles). The title of duke of Lothier became purely honorific and had no further territorial or judicial authority. A few legal courts of Lothier remained in existence, but they only decided in feudal matters.

Lothier should not be confused with the far greater Lower Lotharingia. It is only applicable to:

- The county of Leuven and Brussels, although the Dukes of Brabant assumed this Carolingian heritage to be allodial.
- The landgraviate, from 1183/1184 Duchy of Brabant, an imperial fief lifted out of the duchy of Lower Lotharingia from about 1085/1086. It included also the advocacy of all ecclesiastic institutions within the landgraviate.
- The Margraviate of Antwerp, a traditional administrative fief of the former Dukes of Lower Lotharingia.
- The advocacy over the abbey of Nivelles, an imperial fief.
- The advocacy over the abbey of Gembloux.
