= Godfrey III of Louvain =

Flemish noble

Godfrey III
- Duke of Lower Lorraine; Landgrave of Brabant; Count of Louvain; Count of Brussels
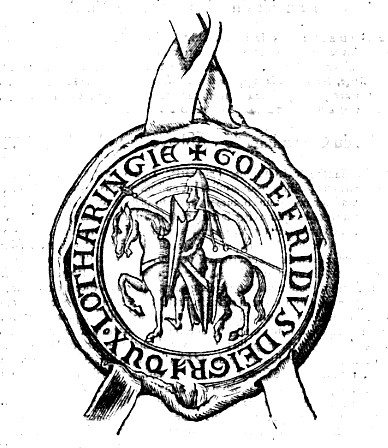
- Effigy of Godfrey on his seal
- Born: c. 1142
- Died: 21 August 1190
- Noble family: House of Reginar
- Spouses: Margaret of Limbourg; Imagina of Looz
- Issue: Henry I, Duke of Brabant; Saint Albert, Prince-Bishop of Liège; William; Godfrey
- Father: Godfrey II, Count of Louvain
- Mother: Luitgarde of Sulzbach

Godfrey III (German: Gottfried, Dutch: Godfried; c. 1142 – 21 August 1190) was count of Louvain (or Leuven), landgrave of Brabant, margrave of Antwerp, and duke of Lower Lorraine (as Godfrey VIII) from 1142 to his death.

== Origins ==
Godfrey was the son of Godfrey II and Luitgarde of Sulzbach. He was still an infant at his succession (therefore called dux in cunis) of which a few Brabantian vassals sought to take advantage to become independent of the duke (Wars of Grimbergen, 1141–1159).

== Career ==
On 30 March 1147, Godfrey was present at the coronation of Henry Berengar, son of Conrad III of Germany, in Aachen. When Conrad left on Crusade, war began anew in 1148. Peace was elusive until the election of Conrad's successor, Frederick Barbarossa. By marriage to Margaret, daughter of Henry II of Limburg, Godfrey united two powerful and antagonistic houses in the region.

In 1159 Godfrey ended the war with the Berthout, lords of Grimbergen, by burning their impressive castle at Grimbergen. In 1171, Godfrey was at war with Hainaut, but was defeated. In 1172, he bought the County of Aarschot from its wayward count Godfried III, which in future generations would give rise to the dynasty of the dukes of Aarschot that remain to this day. In 1179, he gave his son Henry in marriage to a niece of Philip of Alsace, Count of Flanders.

Between 1182 and 1184 Godfrey went on a Jerusalem campaign. In the interim, Barbarossa granted Henry the title "Duke of Brabant". Godfrey died in 1190, on 10 or 21 August. He left an increased territory and built the fortress of Nedelaer (near Vilvoorde). The ducal title was transmitted to his son at the Diet of Schwäbisch Hall (September 1190).

== Marriages and children ==
Godfrey married twice:

- Firstly, to Margaret of Limbourg, daughter of Henry II, Duke of Limburg, in 1158, by whom he had two children:
  - Henry I, Duke of Brabant (1165 – 5 September 1235). Henry was installed in 1180 as duke of Lower Lorraine until 1222. He was made count of Louvain in 1183, until 1198. He was installed as Duke of Brabant in 1191.
  - Albert de Louvain (1166 – 24 November 1192). Albert was elected Bishop of Louvain (Liege) in 1191, but assassinated in Reims in 1192.
- Secondly, Godfrey married Imagina of Loon, daughter of Louis I, Count of Loon, by whom he had two children:
  - William of Louvain, Lord of Perwez en Ruysbroek. He married Marie of Orbais, daughter of Enguerrand of Orbais.
  - Godfrey of Louvain (d. 1226), who went to England in 1196 and became Seneschal of the Honour of Eye. He married Alice de Hastings, daughter and heiress of Robert de Hastings (d. c. 1190), feudal baron of Little Easton in Essex, by whom he had:
    - Matthew de Lovaine, Lord of Little Easton, Seneschal of the Honour of Eye (b. about 1202 in Little Easton – d. 1 June 1258 in Little Easton)

Regnal titles
Preceded by Godfrey II	Duke of Lower Lorraine; 1142–1190	Succeeded by Henry I as duke of Lothier
Preceded by Godfrey II	Margrave of Antwerp; 1142–1190	Duchy of Brabant
