= Alexander of Jülich =

Alexander I (called "of Jülich"; French: Alexandre de Juliers, Dutch: Alexander van Gulik) was the prince-bishop of Liège from 1128 to 1134.

As bishop, he received Pope Innocent II, Emperor Lothair II, and Bernard of Clairvaux. As prince, he was a warrior, taking part in the wars of Waleran, Duke of Lower Lorraine against Godfrey I of Leuven.
