= HNLMS Noord-Brabant =

HNLMS Noord-Brabant (Dutch: Hr.Ms. or Zr.Ms. Noord-Brabant) may refer to following ships of the Royal Netherlands Navy:

- HNLMS Noordbrabant (1899), a Holland-class protected cruiser
- HNLMS Noord-Brabant (D810), a Holland-class destroyer
