= Duchy of Brabant =

1183–1794 northwestern state of the Holy Roman Empire

Duchy of Brabant Hertogdom Brabant (Dutch) Duché de Brabant (French) Ducatus Brabantiae (Latin)
- 1183–1430/1797
- Brabantian lion Coat of arms

- The Duchy of Brabant within the Seventeen Provinces of the Low Countries and the borders of the Holy Roman Empire (thick line)
- Status: State of the Holy Roman Empire; part of the Burgundian Netherlands (1430–1482); part of the Habsburg Netherlands (1482–1794); part of the Southern Netherlands (1648–1794)
- Capital: Brussels
- Religion: Roman Catholicism
- Government: Feudal duchy
- Duke of Brabant
  - 1183/1184–1235: Henry I (first)
  - 1792–1797: Francis I (last)
- Historical era: Middle Ages
  - Established: 1183
  - Inherited by Duchy of Burgundy: 1430
  - Inherited by House of Habsburg: 1482
  - Inherited by Habsburg Spain: 1556
  - Peace of Münster: 30 January 1648
  - Treaty of Rastatt: 7 March 1714
  - Battle of Sprimont: 18 September 1797
Preceded by
Landgraviate of Brabant
County of Louvain
Succeeded by
Burgundian Netherlands
Dutch Republic
Deux-Nèthes
Dyle (department)
- Today part of: Belgium; Netherlands

The Duchy of Brabant was a state of the Holy Roman Empire, established in 1183. It developed from the Landgraviate of Brabant of 1085–1183, and formed the heart of the historic Low Countries. The Duchy comprised part of the Burgundian Netherlands from 1430 and of the Habsburg Netherlands from 1482, until it was partitioned after the Dutch revolt of 1566–1648.

The 1648 Peace of Westphalia ceded present-day North Brabant (Dutch: Noord-Brabant) to the Generality Lands of the Dutch Republic, while the reduced duchy remained part of the Habsburg Netherlands until French Revolutionary forces conquered it in 1794 — a change recognized by the Treaty of Campo Formio in 1797.

Today all the duchy's former territories, apart from exclaves, are divided between Belgium and the Dutch province of North Brabant.

== Geography ==
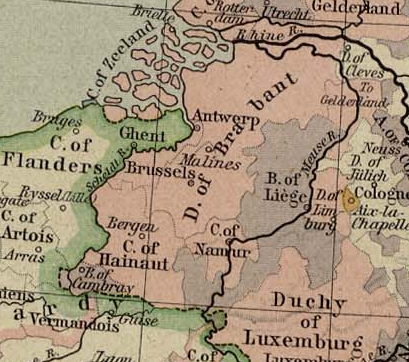
Duchy of Brabant and Prince-Bishopric of Liège in 1477.

The Duchy of Brabant (adjective: Brabantian or Brabantine) was historically divided into four parts, each with its own capital. The four capitals were Leuven, Brussels, Antwerp and 's-Hertogenbosch. Before 's-Hertogenbosch was founded, Tienen was the fourth capital.

Its territory consisted essentially of the three modern-day Belgian provinces of Flemish Brabant, Walloon Brabant and Antwerp; the Brussels-Capital Region; and most of the present-day Dutch province of North Brabant.

== Brabantian lion ==
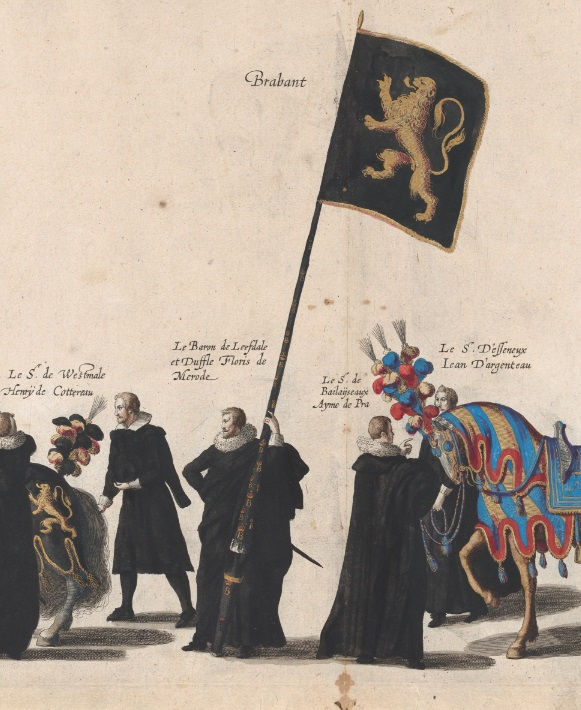
Brabantian Lion by Floris de Merode, Baron of Leefdael during the solemn Funeral of Albert VII, Archduke of Austria

The modern flag of Belgium takes its colors from Brabant's coat of arms: Sable a lion or armed and langued gules (a gold lion on a black field with red claws and tongue).

Probably first used by Count Lambert I of Louvain (ruled 1003–1015), the lion is documented in a 1306 town's seal of Kerpen, together with the red lion of Limburg. Up to the present, the Brabantian lion features as the primary heraldic charge on the coats of arms of both Flemish and Walloon Brabant, and of the Dutch province of North Brabant.

== History ==
History of the Low Countries (schematic)
Frisii		Germanic tribes		Belgae & Celts			
Frisii	Cana– nefates (Note: Roman foederati)	Chamavi, Tubantes (Note: The Chamavi merged into the confederation of the Franks; the Tubantes merged into the confederation of the Saxons.)		Gallia Belgica (55 BC–c. 5th century AD); Germania Inferior (83–c. 5th century)			
Frisii	Cana– nefates	Salian Franks		Batavi			
unpopulated (4th –c. 5th centuries)		Saxons	Salian Franks (4th–c. 5th centuries)				
Frisian Kingdom (c. 6th century – 734)		Saxons	Frankish Kingdom (481–843)—Carolingian Empire (800–843)				
Frisian Kingdom (c. 6th century – 734)		Austrasia (511–687)					
Middle Francia (843–855)				West; Francia (from 843)	Middle Francia (843–855)		
Kingdom of Lotharingia (Note: Part of East Francia after 939, divided in Upper Lorraine (as part of West Francia) and Lower Lorraine (as part of East Francia) in 959.) (855–959); Duchy of Lower Lorraine (Note: Lower Lorraine—also referred to as Lothier—disintegrated into several smaller independent territories and only the title of a "Duke of Lothier" remained, held by Brabant.) (from 959)			Kingdom of Lotharingia (855–959); Duchy of Lower Lorraine (from 959)	West; Francia (from 843)	Kingdom of Lotharingia (855–959); Duchy of Lower Lorraine (from 959)		
Frisia			Kingdom of Lotharingia (855–959); Duchy of Lower Lorraine (from 959)	County of Flanders (Note: Including County of Artois (part of Flanders until 1237) and Tournaisis.) (862–1384)	Kingdom of Lotharingia (855–959); Duchy of Lower Lorraine (from 959)		
Frisian; Freedom (Note: Lordship of Frisia and Lordship of Groningen (including the Ommelanden) after 1524 and 1536 respectively.) (11th–16th centuries)	County of Holland (Note: Including County of Zeeland, that was ruled by neighboring County of Holland and County of Flanders (until 1432).) (880–1432)	Bishopric of Utrecht (Note: Utrecht included Lordship of Overijssel (until 1528), County of Drenthe (until 1528) and County of Zutphen (until 1182).) (695–1456)	Duchy of Brabant (Note: Duchy of Brabant included since 1288 also the Duchy of Limburg (now part of Belgium's Liège Province) and the "Overmaas" lands Dalhem, Valkenburg and Herzogenrath (now part of the Dutch Province of Limburg).) (1183–1430) Duchy of Guelders (Note: The county, later duchy, of Guelders consisted of four quarters, as they were separated by rivers: situated upstream Upper Quarter (the present day northern half of the Dutch province of Limburg), spatially separated from the three downstream Lower Quarters: County of Zutphen (after 1182), Veluwe Quarter and Nijmegen Quarter. The three lower quarters emerged from the historic gau Hamaland (named after the Chamavi tribe), and formed the present day province of Gelderland. Guelders did not include the Cleves enclave Huissen and the independent counties of Buren and Culemborg, that were much later seceded to the province of Gelderland.) (1046–1543)	County of Flanders (862–1384)	County of Hainaut (1071–1432) County of Namur (981–1421)	Prince- Bishopric of Liège (Note: Throughout the Middle Ages, the bishopric was further expanded with the Duchy of Bouillon in 1096 (ceded to France in 1678), the acquisition of the county of Loon in 1366 and the county of Horne in 1568. The Lordship of Mechelen was also part of the Prince-Bishopric of Liège.)(980–1791)	Duchy of Luxembourg (1059–1443)
Frisian; Freedom (11th–16th centuries)	Burgundian Netherlands (1384–1482)					Prince- Bishopric of Liège (980–1791)	Burgundian Netherlands (1384–1482)
Habsburg Netherlands (1482–1795) (Seventeen Provinces after 1543) (Note: The name Seventeen Provinces came in use after the Habsburg emperor Charles V had re-acquired the Duchy of Guelders, and an continuous territory arose.)						Prince- Bishopric of Liège (980–1791)	Habsburg Netherlands (1482–1795) (Seventeen Provinces after 1543)
Dutch Republic (1581–1795)				Spanish Netherlands (1556–1714)		Prince- Bishopric of Liège (980–1791)	Spanish Netherlands (1556–1714)
Dutch Republic (1581–1795)				Austrian Netherlands (1714–1795)		Prince- Bishopric of Liège (980–1791)	Austrian Netherlands (1714–1795)
Dutch Republic (1581–1795)				United States of Belgium (1790)		Republic of Liège (1789–'91)	United States of Belgium (1790)
Dutch Republic (1581–1795)				Austrian Netherlands (1795–1797)		P.-Bish. of Liège (1791–1794)	Austrian Netherlands (1795–1797)
Batavian Republic (1795–1806); Kingdom of Holland (1806–1810)			associated with French First Republic (1795–1804) part of First French Empire (1804–1815)				
part of First French Empire (1810–1813)			associated with French First Republic (1795–1804) part of First French Empire (1804–1815)				
Sovereign Principality of the Netherlands (1813–1815)			associated with French First Republic (1795–1804) part of First French Empire (1804–1815)				
United Kingdom of the Netherlands (1815–1830)							Grand Duchy of Luxembourg (from 1815)
Kingdom of the Netherlands (from 1839)				Kingdom of Belgium (from 1830)			Grand Duchy of Luxembourg (from 1815)
Kingdom of the Netherlands (from 1839)				Kingdom of Belgium (from 1830)			Grand Duchy of Luxembourg (from 1890)

The region's name is first recorded as the Carolingian shire pagus Bracbatensis, located between the rivers Scheldt and Dijle, from braec "marshy" and bant "region". Upon the 843 Treaty of Verdun it was part of Lotharingia within short-lived Middle Francia, and was ceded to East Francia according to the 880 Treaty of Ribemont.

In earlier Roman times, the Nervii, a Belgic tribe, lived in the same area. They were incorporated into the Roman province of Belgica, and considered to have both Celtic and Germanic cultural links. At the end of the Roman period the region was conquered by the Germanic Franks.

=== Counts of Leuven ===
In 959 the East Frankish king Otto I of Germany elevated Count Godfrey of Jülich to the rank of duke of Lower Lorraine. In 962 the duchy became an integral part of the Holy Roman Empire, where Godfrey's successors of the ducal Ardennes-Verdun dynasty also ruled over the Gau of Brabant. Here, the counts of Leuven rose to power, when about 1000 Count Lambert I the Bearded married Gerberga, the daughter of Duke Charles of Lower Lorraine, and acquired the County of Brussels. About 1024 southernmost Brabant fell to Count Reginar V of Mons (Bergen, later Hainaut), and Imperial lands up to the Schelde river in the west came under the rule of the French Counts Baldwin V of Flanders by 1059. Upon the death of Count Palatine Herman II of Lotharingia in 1085, Emperor Henry IV assigned his fief between the Dender and Zenne rivers as the Landgraviate of Brabant to Count Henry III of Leuven and Brussels.

About one hundred years later, in 1183/1184, Emperor Frederick I Barbarossa formally established the Duchy of Brabant and created the hereditary title of duke of Brabant in favour of Henry I of Brabant, son of Count Godfrey III of Leuven. Although the original county was still quite small - and limited to the territory between the Dender and Zenne rivers, situated to the west of Brussels - from the 13th century onwards its name came to apply to the entire territory under control of the dukes.

In 1190, after the death of Godfrey III, Henry I also became Duke of Lower Lotharingia. By that time the title had lost most of its territorial authority. According to protocol, all his successors were thereafter called Dukes of Brabant and Lower Lotharingia (often called Duke of Lothier).

After the Battle of Worringen in 1288, the dukes of Brabant also acquired the Duchy of Limburg and the Lands of Overmaas (trans-Meuse). In 1354 Duke John III of Brabant granted a Joyous Entry (charter of liberty) to the subjects of Brabant.

=== Burgundian and Habsburg Netherlands ===
In 1430 the Duchies of Lower Lotharingia, Brabant and Limburg were inherited by Philip the Good of Burgundy and became part of the Burgundian Netherlands.

In 1477 the Duchy of Brabant became part of the House of Habsburg as part of the dowry of Mary of Burgundy. At that time the Duchy extended from Luttre, south of Nivelles to 's Hertogenbosch, with Leuven as the capital city. The subsequent history of Brabant is part of the history of the Habsburg Seventeen Provinces.

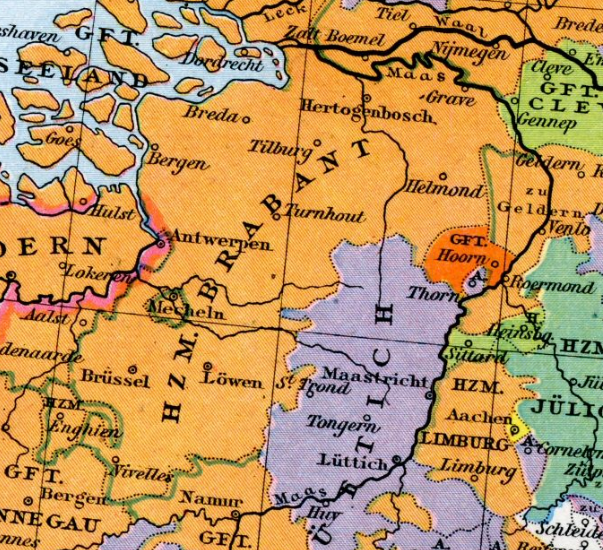
The Duchy of Brabant in the 15th century

=== Eighty Years War and division of Brabant ===
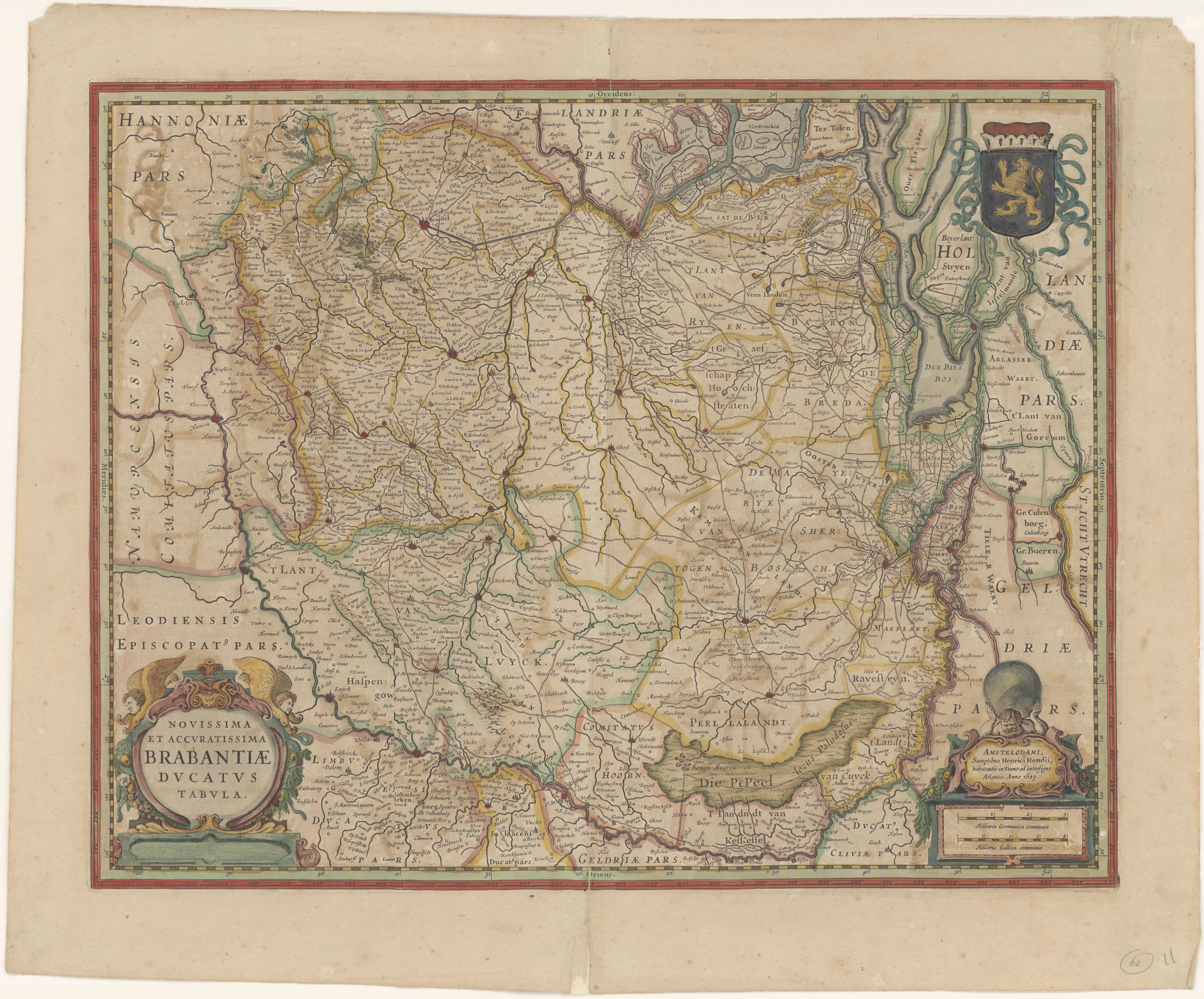
Novissima et Accuratissima Brabantiae Ducatus Tabula (a very new and most accurate map of the Duchy of Brabant); by Hendrik Hondius, 1629

The Eighty Years' War (1568–1648) brought the northern parts (essentially the present Dutch province of North Brabant) under military control of the northern insurgents. After the Treaty of Westphalia in 1648, the United Provinces' independence was confirmed and northern Brabant was formally ceded to the United Provinces as Staats-Brabant, a federally governed territory and part of the Dutch Republic.

The southern part remained in Spanish Habsburg hands as a part of the Southern Netherlands. It was transferred to the Austrian branch of the Habsburg monarchy in 1714. Brabant was included in the unrecognised United States of Belgium, which existed from January to December 1790 during short-lived revolt against Emperor Joseph II, until imperial troops regained the Austrian Netherlands for Leopold II who had succeeded his brother.

The area was overrun during the French Revolution in 1794, and formally annexed by France in 1795. The duchy of Brabant was dissolved and the territory was reorganised in the départements of Deux-Nèthes (present province of Antwerp) and Dyle (the later province of Brabant).

After the defeat of Bonaparte in 1815, the United Kingdom of the Netherlands was created at the Congress of Vienna. The three old provinces were restored as North Brabant, Antwerp and South Brabant. The latter two became part of modern Belgium when it was created in 1830, South Brabant becoming simply Brabant province.

== Cities of Brabant ==
Brabant had fortified walled cities and unwalled cities. The unwalled cities did not have the right to construct walls. Trade was allowed in the walled areas and usually this right resulted in a larger population and the development of major villages and later cities. The unwalled cities also had the right to hold markets, which they held on large market squares. This distinguishes them from surrounding villages that were not allowed to hold markets and did not possess market squares. Being unwalled also meant that some of these places suffered heavily in war and during the Dutch Revolt.

=== Quarter of Leuven ===
==== Walled cities ====
- Leuven: the capital city of the original region from where Brabant expanded. It has been a university town since 1425.
- Tienen: east of Leuven. Historically, it was, along with Lier and Diest, one of the bigger cities after the four regional city capitals.
- Zoutleeuw: east of Tienen. It lies near the border of Brabant. In its days, it was a wealthy merchant town. It was also the biggest garrison site near the border with Liege. A swamp separates Zoutleeuw from Liège.
- Landen: south east of Zoutleeuw; a small garrison town. Many noted people lived to the near south-west of it: Pepin of Landen, his wife, Itta of Metz (or St. Ida), and their daughter, St. Gertrude of Nivelles, as well as St. Bavo and St. Begga.
- Hannut: south of Landen. Like Landen, it was a small garrison town.
- Aarschot: north east of Leuven. It was once the capital of the Duchy of Aarschot. It is famous for its architecture in the "Demer" gothic style, which uses a local type of red stone for its churches and other important buildings.
- Scherpenheuvel: east of Aarschot. It was, and is, the only baroque town in the Low Countries. As such, it is still an important place of pilgrimage.
- Zichem: north of Scherpenheuvel. The city was destroyed during the Dutch Revolt, which left it with a 'rural undeveloped character' ever since. The church and the Maagdentoren (tower of the Virgin) in local red stone are buildings from Zichem's past. Zichem was once part of the Barony of Diest.
- Diest: east of Scherpenheuvel. It was one of Brabant's biggest cities, after the four capitals, and was an important brewery town. The city still counts numerous monuments of its past as attractions today. Like Zichem and Breda it is a Nassau city. Diest was also the capital of the Barony of Diest, and its lands.
- Halen: A small garrison city where the "Battle of the Silver Helmets" took place during World War I; a victory for the Royal Belgian Cavalry.
- Jodoigne: south of Tienen. The city and the surrounding area is known for its white stone. Many battles have taken place in this region, and other parts of Walloon Brabant.
- Gembloux: south west of Jodoigne. Is known for the buildings of Gembloux Abbey.

==== Unwalled cities ====
- Dormaal: south of Zoutleeuw. Although it holds city rights it never developed into a city and could be considered a village.

=== Quarter of Brussels ===
==== Walled cities ====
- Brussels: the capital city of this part of Brabant. Also former capital of the Seventeen Provinces, and of the Southern part of the Seventeen Provinces; today it is the capital of the Kingdom of Belgium. Once known as the 'city of nobles' because of the presence of the Royal Court.
- Vilvoorde: north of Brussels. The first modern purpose-built prison of the Austrian Netherlands was opened here in 1779.
- Nivelles: south of Brussels. Known for its church and as the birthplace of Saint Gertrude of Nivelles, who played an important role in the early history of Brussels and the local region.

==== Unwalled cities ====
- Braine-l'Alleud: south of Brussels. The Battle of Waterloo, where the Duke of Wellington of Great Britain defeated Emperor Napoleon I of France, took place near this small city. The church functioned as a hospital at the time for the many casualties of the conflict.
- Genappe: east of Nivelles; a small city with an old town centre developed around a market square.
- La Hulpe: north east of Braine-l'Alleud. Could be considered a village, although it was allowed to hold markets and held justice in its own small domain. It has become more well-known lately as the residence of Ernest Solvay.
- Overijse: south east of Brussels. Historically more important, as it held its own trade market Béguinage and cloth hall; but the city never expanded beyond the large market square.
- Tervuren: east of Brussels. Tervuren was the country residence of the Dukes of Brabant, and continued as such when the Habsburgs took over. Stately homes of the old noble families characterise Tervuren. Also, the more recent Congo Museum is situated in the Park of Tervuren.
- Duisburg: south east of Tervuren; was ruled by the Abbey of Coudenberg, who never allowed it to develop into a city.
- Merchtem: north west of Brussels. A small unwalled city, with pretensions, but it was larger than the towns of La Hulpe or Duisburg.
- Asse: West of Brussels. Next to Genappe and Braine Alleud, it was one of the bigger unwalled cities of the Brussels quarter. Today it has an old hospital and market square.
- Wavre: west of Jodoigne and today the capital of Walloon Brabant.

=== Quarter of Antwerp ===
==== Walled cities ====
- Antwerp: the capital of this quarter. Also the episcopal see for this part of Brabant, which included the Barony of Breda and the Margraviate of Bergen op Zoom. Antwerp today is a city of business and trade with many merchant palaces still standing in the old town.
- Lier: south east of Antwerp. Known as the wedding site of the parents of Charles V, Holy Roman Emperor, an event which led to many future political changes.
- Herentals: east of Lier. A city located in a forested area.
- Zandvliet: north of Antwerp. A garrison city built to defend the Southern Netherlands.
- Bergen op Zoom: north of Zandvliet. Old fortified port town.
- Steenbergen: north of Bergen op Zoom; also an important port town.
- Breda: north east of Antwerp. One of the Nassau trade cities, fortified city and an important military center (even currently).

==== Unwalled cities ====
- Turnhout: de jure Turnhout was a walled city, but de facto the city stays unwalled. The largest of the unwalled cities of Brabant.
- Geel: east of Herentals. Known for its early and present health care facilities.
- Hoogstraten: north east of Antwerp. Capital of the County of Hoogstraten, later a Duchy of the Princes of Salm.
- Duffel: south of Antwerp. An important barony of the later Middle Ages which was largely destroyed by wars. Its name has been remembered, and is now used as the common military name for a small clothes carrying bag.
- Walem: part of the Barony of Duffel; never became more than a village.
- Arendonk: east of Turnhout. Famous for training falcons and eagles for use in the Hunt.

Note: the city of Mechelen formed an independent state along with the Land of Heist-op-den-Berg and Gestel. Willemstad, Geertruidenberg and Klundert were part of the County of Holland.

=== Quarter of 's-Hertogenbosch ===
==== Walled cities ====
- Bois-le-Duc ('s-Hertogenbosch): regional capital city and episcopal see of this part of Brabant.
- Heusden: north west of 's Hertogenbosch. It was said to be an "untakeable city" (in the military sense), and it lies close to the boundaries of the old Counties of Holland and Guelders.
- Helmond: built as a military counterweight barrier to the counts of Guelders. It has a massive water fortress of historical interest.
- Ravenstein: east of 's Hertogenbosch. Founded by a vassal of the duke of Brabant. Became part of the Duchy of Cleves in 1397 and remained a separate territory until 1795. A later duke of Cleves sent his sister, Anne of Cleves, to England to become one of the two surviving wives of King Henry VIII.
- Meghem (now called Megen): north-west of Ravenstein. A small town, originally independent as capital of the county with the same name which later became semi-dependent of Brabant. Was granted city rights in 1357.
- Grave: south-east of Ravenstein: a smaller garrison town on the north-east side of Brabant and capital of the 'Land van Cuijk'. Was granted city rights in 1233. The lords of Grave aligned themselves with the dukes of Guelders, rivals of the dukes of Brabant, from time to time. Became an integral part of 'Staats-Brabant' in 1648.
- Eindhoven: was granted city rights in 1232 shortly after starting out as one of the first 'planned' new cities in Europe. Its magnificent walls were demolished in the Eighty Years War, and were never to be rebuilt.

==== Unwalled cities ====
- Oirschot
- Oisterwijk
- Waalwijk
- Vught

== See also ==
- Duke of Brabant (with genealogies)
- Lohengrin (opera)
- War of Devolution (1667–1668)
