= Henry, Duke of Lower Lorraine =

Duke of Lower Lorraine

Henry
- Born: c. 1059
- Died: c. 1119
- Noble family: House of Limburg
- Spouse: Adelaide of Pottenstein
- Issue: Waleran, Duke of Lower Lorraine; 3 daughters
- Father: Waleran I of Limburg?

Henry I (c. 1059 – c. 1119) was the count of Limburg and Arlon from 1082 to his death and duke of Lower Lorraine between 1101 and 1106. His mother was Jutta, daughter of Frederick, Duke of Lower Lorraine, and his father is uncertain, but possibly named Count Udon.

He opposed Egilbert, Archbishop of Trier, and took back some property which the former Countess Adela had given to the church. Egilbert summoned him to return them, but he refused and was excommunicated. Egilbert took up arms and seriously defeated him.

As superior advocate of the abbey of Sint-Truiden, a title he had inherited from his grandfather Duke Frederick, he intervened in the internal affairs of the abbey. The abbot Herman, named by Poppo, Bishop of Metz, and supported by Godfrey of Bouillon and Henry, fell out with the Emperor Henry IV. Arnold, Count of Loon forced Henry and Godfrey to withdraw from the monastery.

After many local nobles left on the First Crusade, among them Godfrey, Henry's power in the region of Lower Lotharingia (or Lorraine) was greatly increased and he abused it, especially against the monasteries. The emperor intervened and took Limburg in July 1101. Henry was now forced to make submission and he was granted the duchy of Lower Lorraine, which Godfrey had abandoned on Crusade.

As duke, he fell into competition with Godfrey I of Louvain. He demonstrated little in the way of loyalty to the emperor either. He joined Henry V against his father the emperor, but then turned back to the emperor's side. This was unfortunate for the duke, for the emperor died in 1106 and the partisans of Henry V attacked those of his father. The fields were devastated, Limburg was taken, and Henry was imprisoned in Hildesheim. The duchy was transferred to Godfrey of Louvain.

Henry later escaped and tried to retake Limburg and Lower Lorraine. He failed and made peace with the new emperor and duke. He continued nevertheless to employ the ducal title as "Duke of Limburg," the first of a long line. He also readily joined revolts against Henry V, fighting at the side of Lothair, Duke of Saxony at the victories of Andernach in 1114 and Welphesholt on 11 February 1115. He was succeeded by his son Waleran Paganus.

He married Adelaide of Pottenstein (1061–1106), a daughter of Botho of Pottenstein (or Potenstein) and Judith, the daughter of Otto III, Duke of Swabia and Immilla of Turin. They had the aforementioned Waleran and three daughters. One daughter, Adelaide, married Conrad I, Duke of Merania. Henry may also have been the father of Simon, Constable of Jerusalem after the First Crusade.

== Sources ==
- Kupper, Jean-Louis (2007), "Les origines du duché de Limbourg-sur-Vesdre", Revue belge de Philologie et d'Histoire Année, 85 (3–4): 609–637, doi:10.3406/rbph.2007.5096
- Loud, Graham A.; Schenk, Jochen, eds. (2017). The Origins of the German Principalities, 1100–1350: Essays by German Historians. Routledge.

Henry House of Ardennes Born: c. 1059 Died: c. 1119
Regnal titles
| Preceded by Godfrey V | Duke of Lower Lorraine; Margrave of Antwerp; 1101–1106 | Succeeded by Godfrey VI |
| Preceded by Waleran I | Count of Limburg; 1082–1119 | Succeeded by Waleran II |
