= Godfrey II of Louvain =

Count of Louvain and landgrave of Brabant (c. 1110–1142)

Godfrey II
- Duke of Lower Lorraine; Landgrave of Brabant; Count of Louvain; Count of Brussels
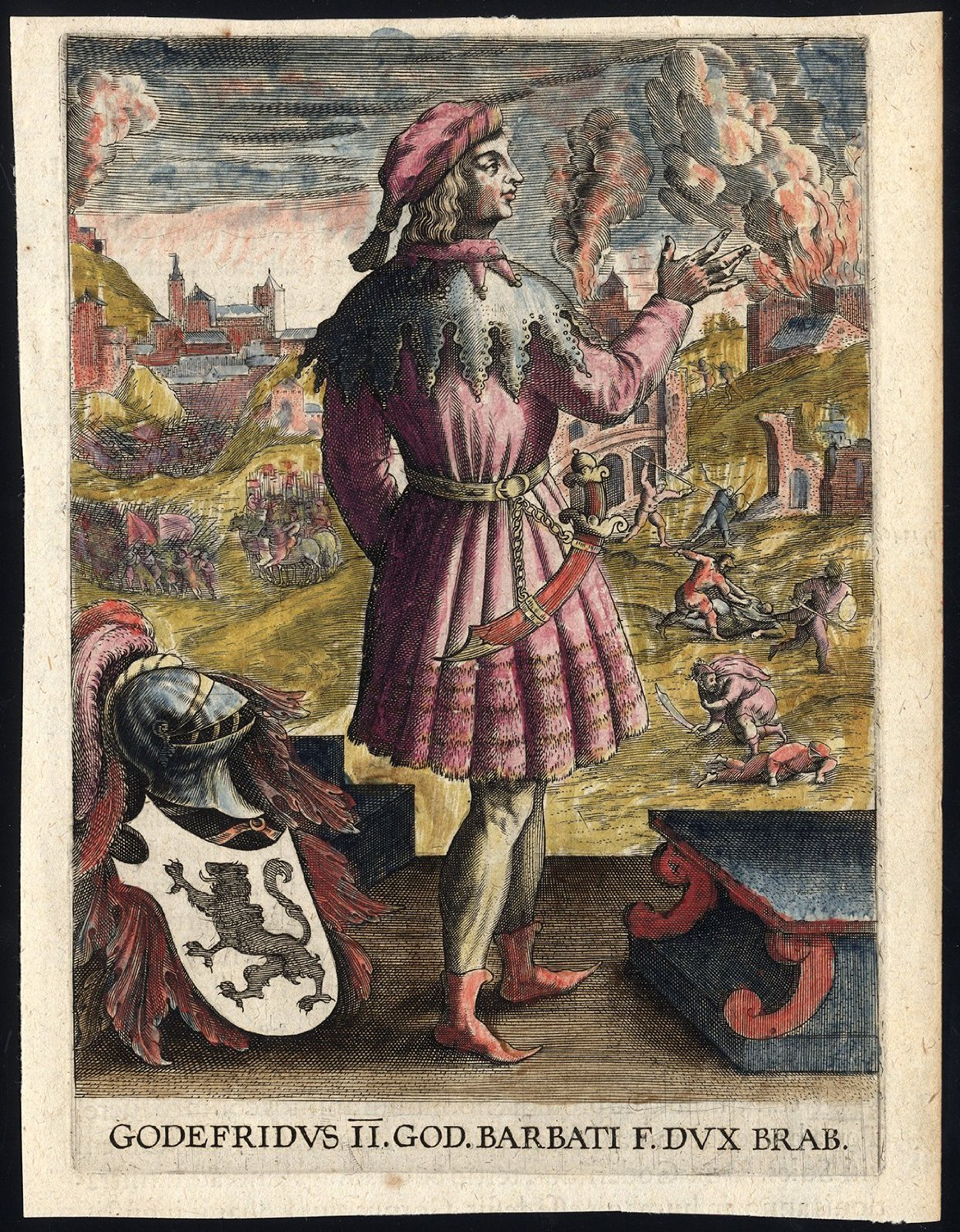
- Born: c. 1110
- Died: 13 June 1142 (aged 32)
- Noble family: House of Reginar
- Spouse: Luitgarde of Sulzbach
- Issue: Godfrey III, Count of Louvain
- Father: Godfrey I, Count of Louvain
- Mother: Ida of Chiny

Godfrey II (Dutch: Godfried; c. 1110 – 13 June 1142) was the count of Louvain, landgrave of Brabant by inheritance from 23 January 1139. He was the son of Godfrey I and Ida of Chiny. He was also the duke of Lower Lorraine (as Godfrey VII), and as such also margrave of Antwerp, by appointment in 1139 after the death of Duke Waleran.

He was first associated with his father in 1136, when he first carried the ducal title. This was confirmed by Conrad III of Germany, who had married the sister of Godfrey's wife. Waleran left a son, Henry II of Limburg, who asserted his father's ducal rights. Godfrey and Henry entered into a war in which the latter was decisively and quickly destroyed. Godfrey did not long enjoy his victory. He was killed by a disease of the liver two years thence. He was buried in St. Peter's Church in Leuven.

He married Luitgarde, daughter of Berengar II of Sulzbach and sister of German Queen Gertrude von Sulzbach, wife of Conrad III of Germany, and Bertha, wife of Manuel I Comnenus, the Byzantine emperor. Through this marriage Godfrey became connected to the influential Hohenstaufen dynasty. This alliance strengthened his political influence within the Holy Roman Empire during a period of considerable political and territorial conflict.

He was succeeded by his son Godfrey III in both the counties and the duchy.

== Sources ==
- Source (obsolete): Ancestral Roots of Certain American Colonists Who Came to America Before 1700 by Frederick Lewis Weis, Line 155-24.
- Chronique des Ducs de Brabant, Adrian van Baerland, Antwerp (1612). Available at the online library of Geneanet.

Regnal titles
Preceded by Waleran	Duke of Lower Lorraine; Margrave of Antwerp; 1139–1142	Succeeded by Godfrey III
