= Brunengeruz =

The county of Brunengeruz (spelled in various ways such as Brugeron, Brunengeruuz, Brunengurt) existed in the 10th and 11th centuries in what is now eastern Belgium, between the town of Leuven on the river Dyle and Tienen on the river Gete. It was part of the larger region known as the Hesbaye. The name is sometimes interpreted with "corrected" forms such as Brunenrode, because the Latin spellings are believed to derive from Brūninga roþa, meaning a forest clearing (typically rode or rooi in modern Dutch placenames) belonging to the kinsfolk of Bruno.

August 27th 988, this county was granted by Otto III and became part of the secular lordship of the bishops of Liège, contributing to the creation of the "prince-bishopric" of Liège. There are indications that prior to this the county had been held by a countess named Alpeidis, who may have also originally have held Jodoigne in the 10th century as part of a larger version of this county.

In 1036 the place Wulmerson, near Grimde, was mentioned in a record as being in the county of "Brunengurt".

The county came to be claimed by the counts of Leuven and over several generations they achieved control of most of the area, excluding Hoegaarden, Beauvechain, Tourinnes-la-Grosse and Chaumont. By 1155, if not earlier, Hoegaarden came to be seen as the chief town of the leftover "county", which remained under the bishops.

The 13th-century writer Giles of Orval in his Gesta episcoporum Leodiensium (II.44) in the entry for 1099, defined the boundaries of the 11th-century version of the disputed county. He explained that this county, contested by the prince-bishops of Liège and the counts of Leuven, was granted by the prince-bishop to Albert III, Count of Namur. Albert's family did not maintain control though, and most of the county came increasingly under the control of Leuven.

Giles described a relatively large area covering much of eastern Flemish Brabant and Walloon Brabant, stretching from Louvain to Tienen. Among the places named was Brunengeruz itself, which was in or near modern Roux-Miroir (medieval Rode).

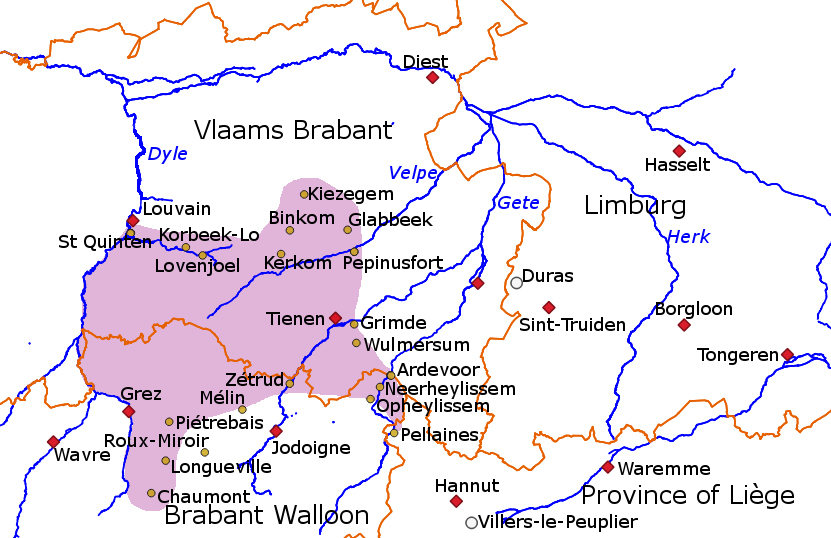
The approximate extent of the county of Brunengeruz.

Giles of Orval's description of the boundaries.
incipit a Pollomortis	beginning at Pollomortis [Apparently a "dead" pool, possibly Pellaines.]
et inter duas villas Hercines	and between the two villas called Hercines [Hélécines?]
usque ad Canitium pontem.	until the bridge at Canitium [A bridge over the Grote Gete.]
Abhinc vadit inter Iusanam villam et Scitrud.	from there goes between Jusanam villa [the lower part of Saint-Rémy-Geest] and Zétrud
Abhinc vadit ad mallum ad Burengerus.	From there goes to Mallum [Mélin] to Brunengerus [Roux-Miroir? Medieval "Rode"]
Abhinc vadit ad rupem que vocatur Sotaelfouarge.	From there goes to the rock called "Sotaelfouarge".
Abhinc vadit ad puteum Longe-ville, totam vallem Hachewadat.	From there goes to the source Longueville, all of the valley of Hachewadat [Haquedeau is an old farm name here]
Abhinc vadit ad sancti Bavonis quercum iuxta Kalmont.	From there goes to the oak of Saint Bavo next to Kalmont [the oak was east of Chaumont].
ipsam sequendo usque ad Sanctum Quintinum sicut currit Tylus.	It follows the course of the Dyle as far as Saint Quintin [southern part of Leuven].
De Sancto Quintino vadit usque ad Robert vadum sequendo aquam.	From Saint Quintin it follows the water until "Robert's ford".
Abhinc vadit usque ad Corbeth.	From there goes as far as Korbeek-Lo.
Dehinc usque ad Louiul.	Next it goes as far as Lovenjoel.
Dehinc usque ad villam Chisechim.	Next it goes as far as the villa of Kiezegem.
Abhinc vadit usque ad villam Bechechim,	From there it goes as far as the villa Binkom,
et abhinc usque ad villam Glabeche,	and from there as far as the villa Glabbeek,
et abhinc usque ad Pipini vadum,	and from there to "Pippin's ford" [on the Velpe],
et de Pipini vado usque ad transitum Grimene,	and from Pippin's ford as far as Grimde,
et inde usque ad pontem Aldevort per gyrum redit ad priorem terminum Polomortis.	and from there to Ardevoor bridge [on the Kleine Gete] by circuit returning to the starting point Polomortis.

== Bibliography ==
- Baerten, Jean (1965), "In Hasbanio comitatus quatuor (Verdrag van Meersen, 870)", Koninklijke Zuinederlandse Maatschappij voor Taal- en Letterkunde en Geschiedenis, XIX
- Buvé, Lodewijk-Clemens (1906), "Het graafschap Brunerode", Bijdragen tot de Geschiedenis Bijzonderlijk van het Aloude Hertogdom Brabant, 5: 100–120
- Daris, Joseph (1880), "L'Ancienne Principauté de Liége IX. Origine et formation de la principauté de Liége", Bulletin de l'Institut archéologique liégeoise, 15
- Grandgagnage, Charles (1854), "Limites du comté de Brunengeruz", Mémoire sur les anciens noms de lieux dans la Belgique orientale, pp. 106–108
- Moulaert, P. B. C. B. (1858), "Essai sur le comté de Brunengeruz, appelé par les historiens modernes Comté de Brugeron" (PDF), Bulletin de la Commission royale d'Histoire, 10: 165–195
- Nonn, Ulrich (1983), Pagus und Comitatus in Niederlothringen: Untersuchung zur politischen Raumgliederung im frühen Mittelalter, p. 140
- Tarlier, Jules; Wauters, Alphonse, "Roux-Miroir", Géographie et Histoire des communes belges
- Tarlier, Jules; Wauters, Alphonse (1882), "Tienen", Géographie et Histoire des communes belges, vol. 7
- Vanderkindere, Léon (1902), La formation territoriale des principautés belges au Moyen Age (PDF), vol. 2, p. 143
- Van der Velpen, J. (1953), "Alpeide stichteres de Collegiale kerk van Hoegaarden", Eigen Schoon en de Brabander, 36: 1–17
