= Margraviate of Antwerp =

Margraviate of the Holy Roman Empire

- 969–1406
- Status: State of the Holy Roman Empire
- Capital: Antwerp
- Government: Margraviate
- Margrave of Antwerp
  - 969-1002: Godfrey I (first)
  - 1142-1190: Godfrey III (last)
- Historical era: Middle Ages
  - Established: 969
  - Merged into Lower Lorraine: 1106
  - inherited by Brabant: 1190
  - Peace of Ath: 1357
  - Reunited with Brabant: 1406
Preceded by	Succeeded by
Lower Lotharingia	Duchy of Brabant
- Today part of: Antwerp Province; North Brabant

The Margraviate of Antwerp (or March of Antwerp) consisted since the eleventh century of the area around the cities of Antwerp and Breda.

== Origin ==
Under Otto II, emperor of the Holy Roman Empire, several marches were created along the border with West Francia (this border coincided with the river Scheldt). Originally the mark was restricted to the borders of the Scheldt, in 994 Ansfried of Utrecht added Toxandria to the mark.

== History ==
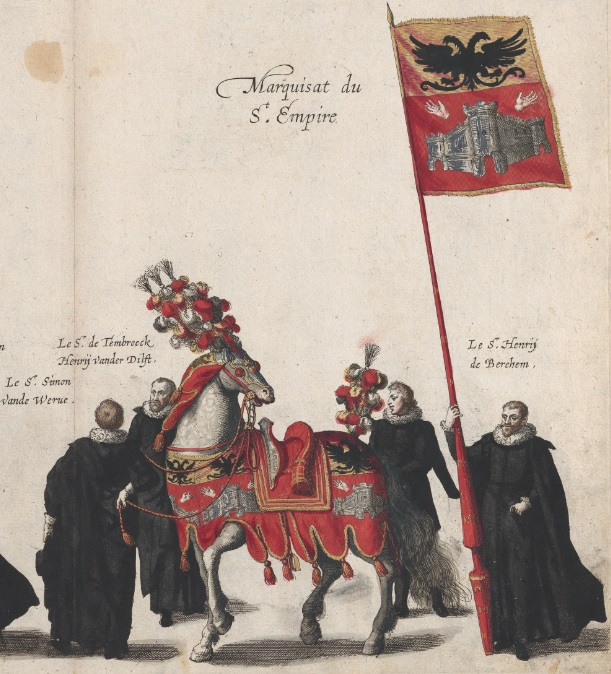
the Marquess of Antwerp symbolised in the funeral procession of Albert VII

In the 11th century the mark of Antwerp was one of the fiefs of the duke of Lower Lorraine. Godfrey of Bouillon received the mark in 1076 from emperor Henry IV. After his death in the Crusader state of Jerusalem in 1100, Henry I of Limburg was appointed as margrave.

In 1106 the duchy of Lower Lorraine and the margraviate were united. After the Diet of Schwäbisch Hall by Emperor Henry VI, in 1190, the duchy was abolished and its titles were given to the duke of Brabant, who continued to use the title of "Margrave of the Holy Roman Empire".

In the 1357 Peace of Ath the margraviate went to Louis II, Count of Flanders and then his daughter Margaret. In 1405 its guardianship fell to her son Anthony, who reunited it with Brabant when he became duke the following year.

The margraviate was often listed separately as one of the Seventeen Provinces in the 16th century.

After the Eighty Years' War the margraviate was part of the Spanish Netherlands, where the title of margrave continued to exist as an honorary title for the representative of the governor.

== Composition ==
The margraviate consisted (after the loss of Breda) of the cities of Antwerp, Herentals and Lier and the quarters of Arkel, Rijen, Geel, Zandhoven, Turnhout and Hoogstraten.

== Margraves of Antwerp ==
- 974–1002 Godfrey I, Count of Verdun
- 1005–1044 Gothelo I the Great
- 1044–1046 Gothelo II the Lazy
- 1046–1065 Frederick of Luxembourg
- 1065–1069 Godfrey III the Bearded
- 1069–1070 Baldwin VI, Count of Flanders
- 1070–1076 Godfrey IV the Hunchback
- 1076–1100 Godfrey of Bouillon
- 1101–1106 Henry I of Limbourg

Counts of Louvin:

- 1106–1139 Godfrey I, Count of Louvain
- 1139–1142 Godfrey II, Count of Louvain
- 1142–1190 Godfrey III, Count of Louvain

Dukes of Brabant:

- 1190–1235 Henry I, Duke of Brabant
- 1235–1248 Henry II, Duke of Brabant
- 1248–1261 Henry III, Duke of Brabant
- 1261–1267 Henry IV, Duke of Brabant
- 1267–1294 John I
- 1294–1312 John II
- 1312–1355 John III
- 1355–1406 Joanna

Counts of Flanders:

- 1357–1384 Louis II, Count of Flanders
- 1384–1405 Margaret III, Countess of Flanders

Dukes of Brabant:

- from 1406 on Personal Union with Brabant
