= Duke of Brabant =

Position of Belgian nobility

Coat of arms of the Duchy of Brabant.

The Duke of Brabant (Dutch: hertog van Brabant, French: duc de Brabant) was the ruler of the Duchy of Brabant since 1183/1184. The title was created by the Holy Roman Emperor Frederick Barbarossa in favor of Henry I of the House of Reginar, son of Godfrey III of Leuven (who was duke of Lower Lorraine at that time). The Duchy of Brabant was a feudal elevation of the existing (since 1085/1086) title of landgrave of Brabant. This was an Imperial fief which was assigned to Count Henry III of Leuven shortly after the death of the preceding count of Brabant, Herman II of Lotharingia (born 20 September 1085). Although the corresponding county was quite small (limited to the territory between the rivers Senne and Dender) its name was applied to the entire country under control of the dukes from the 13th century on. In 1190, after the death of Godfrey III, Henry I also became duke of Lotharingia. Formerly Lower Lotharingia, this title was now practically without territorial authority, but was borne by the later dukes of Brabant as an honorific title.

In 1288, the dukes of Brabant became also dukes of Limburg. The title fell to the dukes of Burgundy in 1430. Later on, it followed with the Burgundian inheritance until the French Revolution, although the northern part of the territory of Brabant was actually governed by the United Provinces during the 17th and 18th centuries (see Generality Lands).

Today, the title of duke or duchess of Brabant designates, since the Royal Decree of 16 December 1840 (amended in 1991 and 2001) the heir apparent to the throne of Belgium. The current holder is Princess Elisabeth.

== House of Reginar (House of Leuven) ==
Coat of arms of the Counts of Leuven

Coat of arms of the Dukes of Brabant and Limburg

Coat of arms de of the Burgundy Dukes of Brabant

Counts of Leuven, Counts of Brussels and Landgraves of Brabant:

- Henry III (1085/1086–1095); already Count of Leuven and Brussels from 1078.
- Godfrey I (from 1095)

Counts of Leuven, Counts of Brussels, Landgraves of Brabant, Margrave of Antwerp and Dukes of Lower-Lorraine:

- Godfrey I (1106–1139) created as Duke in 1106
- Godfrey II (1139–1142)
- Godfrey III (1142–1190)

Dukes of Brabant and Dukes of Lothier:

- Henry I (1190–1235); already Duke of Brabant from 1183/1184
- Henry II (1235–1248)
- Henry III (1248–1261)
- Henry IV (1261–1267)

Dukes of Brabant, Dukes of Lothier and Dukes of Limburg:

- John I (1267–1294)
- John II (1294–1312)
- John III (1312–1355)
- Joanna (1355–1406) – she co-ruled with Wenceslaus of the House of Luxembourg

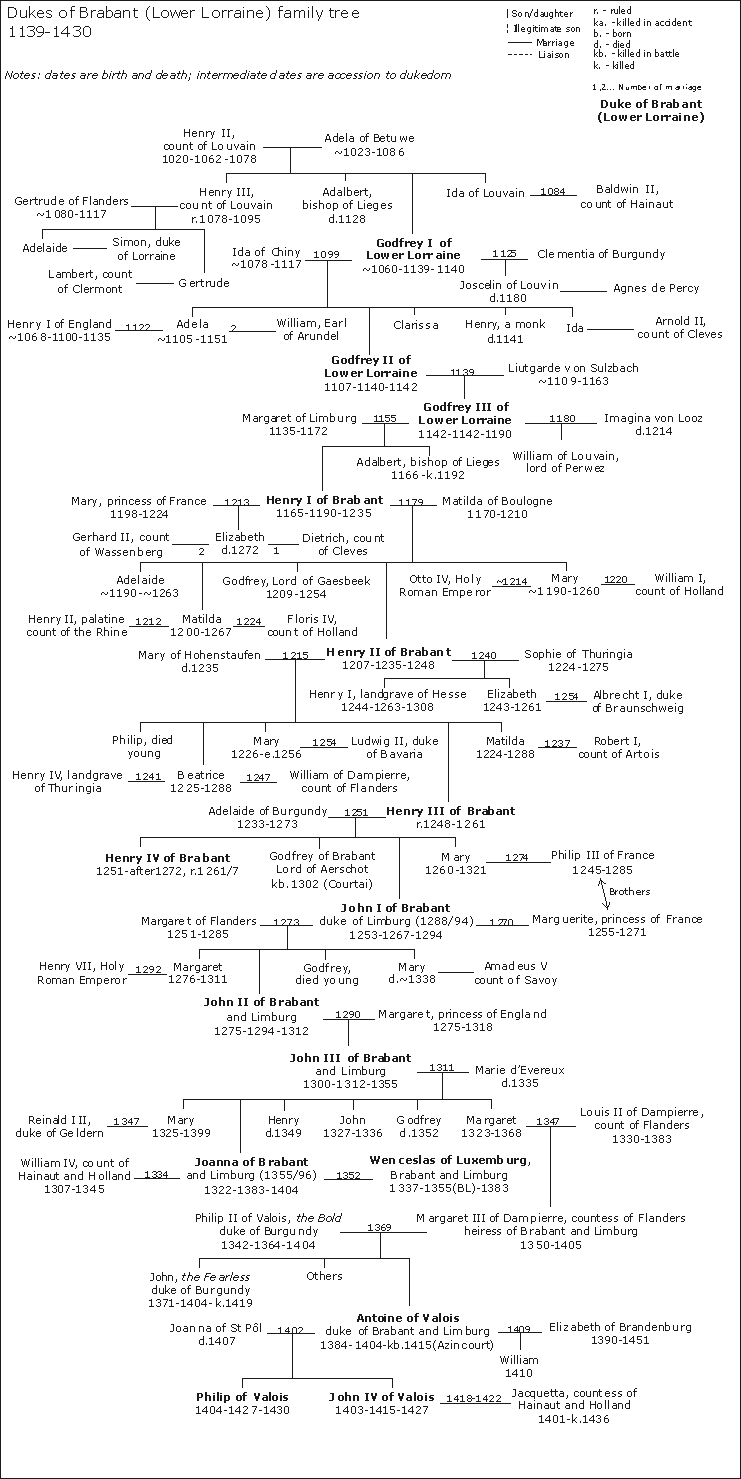

== House of Burgundy ==
Dukes of Brabant, Dukes of Lothier and Dukes of Limburg:

- Anthony, Duke of Brabant (1406–1415) (inherited title from his aunt, Joanna)
- John IV, Duke of Brabant (1415–1427)
- Philip I of Saint-Pol (1427–1430)
- Philip II the Good (1430–1467), member of the House of Valois-Burgundy.
- Charles I the Bold (1467–1477), member of the House of Valois-Burgundy.
- Mary (1477–1482), member of the House of Valois-Burgundy.

== House of Habsburg ==
- Maximilian (regent, 1482–1494), Maximilian I of the Holy Roman Empire.
- Philip III (1494–1506), Philip I of Spain.
- Charles II (1506–1555), Charles I of Spain, and V of the Holy Roman Empire.
- Philip IV (1555–1598), Philip II of Spain.

usurpation by Francis, Duke of Anjou (Valois) (1582–1584)

- Isabella Clara Eugenia and Albert (1598–1621)
- Philip V (1621–1665), Philip IV of Spain.
- Charles III (1665–1700), Charles II of Spain.

== House of Bourbon ==
- Philip VI (1700–1706), Philip V of Spain.

== House of Habsburg and Habsburg-Lorraine ==
- Charles IV (1706–1740), Charles VI of the Holy Roman Empire.
- Maria Theresa (1740–1780), Empress consort of the Holy Roman Empire.
- Joseph (1780–1789), Joseph II of the Holy Roman Empire.
- Leopold (1790–1792), Leopold II of the Holy Roman Empire.
- Francis I (1792–1794), Francis II of the Holy Roman Empire.

== Dynastic context ==
=== House of Belgium (House of Saxe-Coburg and Gotha until 1920) ===
In the current Kingdom of Belgium, the title of "Duke of Brabant" has been revived as a dynastic title at the court, and is traditionally assigned to the oldest son or daughter of the sovereign (even though the province of North Brabant, part of the historical duchy, is now part of the Netherlands and has been so since 1648).

The oldest son or daughter automatically becomes the duke/duchess of Brabant when his/her father becomes King of the Belgians; there is no ceremony or formal oath that the new duke/duchess must pass. When the Duke of Brabant loses his father, or when he abdicates, his title goes to the next in line, and he becomes the new King of the Belgians. Unlike the office of King of the Belgians, the eldest child of the sovereign does not need to reach the age of 18 to become Duke of Brabant. However, if a Duke or Duchess of Brabant has not reached the age of 18, he or she cannot ascend to the throne of Belgium, as stipulated by the constitution. When the prince or princess becomes duke of Brabant, this title takes precedence of the other titles: Prince or Princess of Belgium.

The last Duke of Brabant became King in 2013, and passed the title to his oldest child. The current Duchess, Elisabeth was only 11 years old when she became duchess in 2013. The Dukes and Duchess of the House of Belgium (House of Saxe-Coburg and Gotha until 1920) are as follows:

- Leopold II (1840–1865), king of the Belgians.
- Leopold, son of Leopold II (1865–1869) – the only prince who died a Duke of Brabant.
- Leopold III (1909–1934), king of the Belgians.
- Baudouin (1934–1951), king of the Belgians.
- Philippe (1993–2013), king of the Belgians.
- Elisabeth (2013–present), the heir apparent to the Belgian throne.

Coat of arms of Elisabeth of Belgium, duchess of Brabant.

==== Legislation ====
Article 1, alinea 2, of the Royal Decree of 16 December 1840 says, since an amendment in 2001 : "The title of Duke of Brabant or of Duchess of Brabant will be worn, in future, by the Prince or the Princess, elder son or daughter of the King, and, if lacking, by the Prince or the Princess, elder son or daughter of the elder son or daughter of the King"
