= Landgraviate of Brabant =

Fiefdom in the Holy Roman Empire

- 1085–1183
- Coat of arms
- Status: Landgraviate
- Capital: None
- Common languages: Brabantian, Walloon
- Government: Feudal Monarchy
- Historical era: Middle Ages
  - Established: 1085
  - Disestablished: 1183
Preceded by	Succeeded by
Lower Lotharingia	Duchy of Brabant

The Landgraviate of Brabant (Modern Dutch: Landgraafschap Brabant, Modern French: Landgraviat de Brabant) was a small imperial fiefdom west of Brussels, consisting of the area between the Dender and Zenne rivers in the Low Countries, then part of the Holy Roman Empire.

Before 1085 the land had belonged to Hermann II, Count Palatine of Lotharingia. Upon his death, Emperor Henry IV assigned it to Henry III, Count of Louvain and Brussels, granting him the Landgraviate of Brabant. This is the earliest known use of the term landgrave.

In 1183, Emperor Frederick Barbarossa merged the Landgraviate of Brabant and the counties of Louvain (Dutch: Leuven) and Brussels into the elevated Duchy of Brabant. Henry I became the first Duke of Brabant.

Upon the creation of the United Kingdom of the Netherlands in 1815, the historical area of the Landgraviate and Leuven and Brussels became the basis of the province of South Brabant (Dutch: Zuid-Brabant). From 1830 to 1996, it was named simply the Province of Brabant, of the independent nation of Belgium. It is currently in the western part of Flemish Brabant in the Flemish Region of Belgium.

== Sources ==
- Frans J. Van Droogenbroeck, Het landgraafschap Brabant (1085-1183) en zijn paltsgrafelijke voorgeschiedenis, de territoriale en institutionele aanloop tot het ontstaan van het hertogdom Brabant, in De Hertog en de Staten, de Kanselier en de Raad, de Rekenkamer, het Leenhof, de Algemene Ontvangerij, de Drossaard en de Woudmeester, het Notariaat en het Landgraafschap Brabant. Acht bijdragen tot de studie van de instellingen in het Hertogdom Brabant in de Middeleeuwen en de Nieuwe Tijd, ed. Erik Aerts et al. (Brussels, 2011), pp. 161–176.
- Frans J. Van Droogenbroeck, Het landgraafschap Brabant (1085-1183) en zijn paltsgrafelijke voorgeschiedenis. De territoriale en institutionele aanloop tot het ontstaan van het hertogdom Brabant (eBook, Affligem, 2004).
