= War of the Brabantian Succession =

1356-1357 war of succession between Jeanne, Marguerite and Marie of Brabant

- Flanders; Brabant proper; Limburg (Brabantian); Mechelen (Brabantian; acquired by Flanders in 1357); Guelders proper; Zutphen (Guelderian); Zutphenian dependencies (Guelderian); Luxemburg (Brabantian ally)
Date	15 June 1356 – 4 June 1357
Location	Duchy of Brabant (modern-day Belgium and Netherlands)
Result	Flemish–Guelderian victory: Joanna is recognised as duchess of Brabant, but concedes charter of liberties; Guelders acquires Turnhout and annual payment from Brabant; Flanders acquires Mechelen, Antwerp and surrounding villages

Belligerents
Duchy of Brabant; Duchy of Limburg; Lordship of Mechelen; Duchy of Luxemburg	County of Flanders	Duchy of Guelders; County of Zutphen

Commanders and leaders
Joanna; Wenceslaus	Louis II; Margaret	Reginald III; Mary

The War of the Brabantian Succession (Dutch: Brabantse Successieoorlog, French: Guerre de la succession du Brabant) was a war of succession triggered by the death of John III, Duke of Brabant. He had no sons, and as the Duchy of Brabant had a tradition of male (agnatic) primogeniture, his three daughters and their three husbands, namely the dukes of Luxemburg and Guelders and the count of Flanders, claimed (a part of) the inheritance.

== Background ==
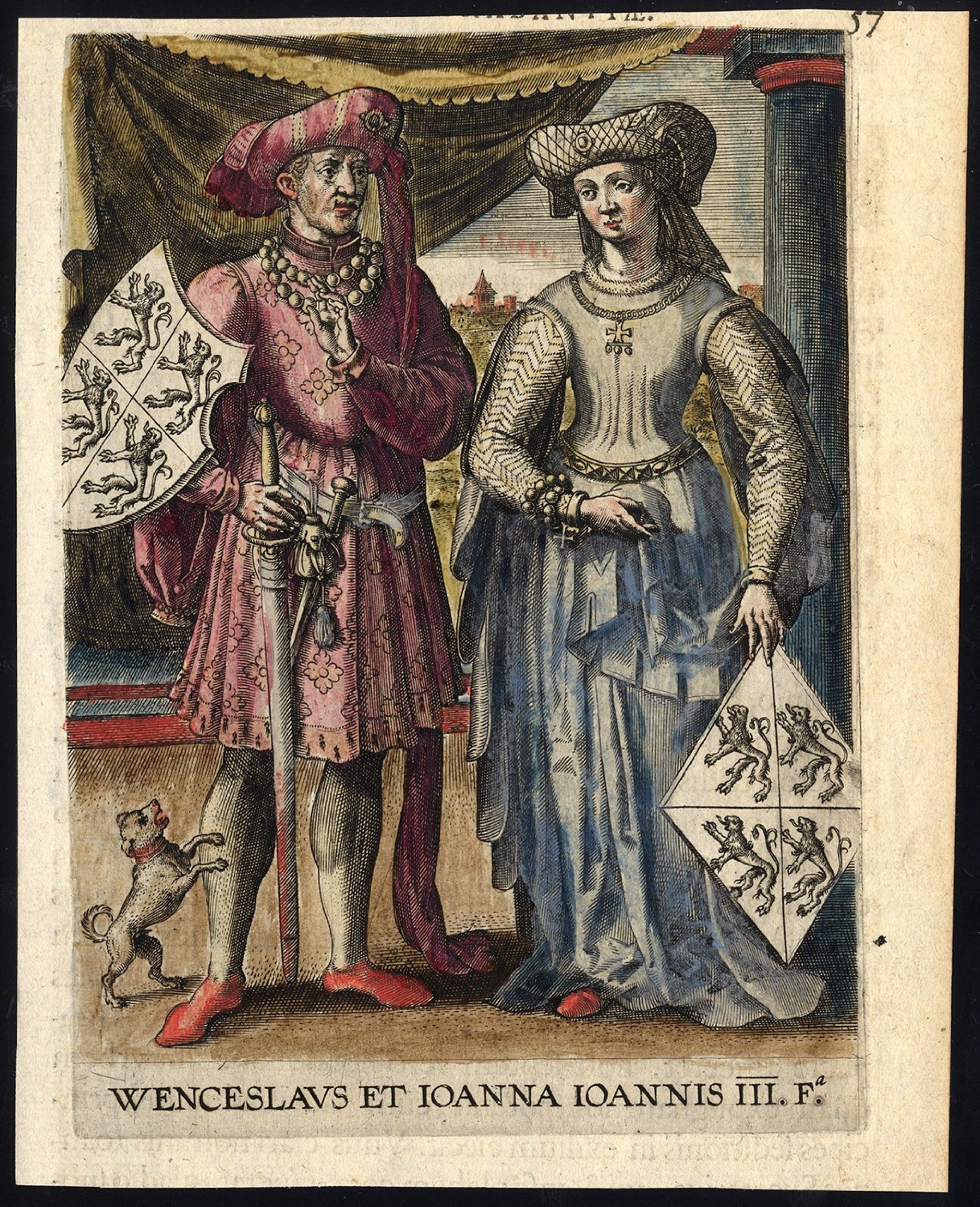
Wenceslaus and Joanna

At the end of his life, John III had a succession problem: his three sons John (1335), Henry (1349) and Godfrey (1352) had all predeceased him, thus leaving only his three daughters:

- Joanna, married to Wenceslaus I, Duke of Luxembourg
- Margaret, married to Louis II, Count of Flanders, alias Louis of Male
- Mary, married to Reginald III, Duke of Guelders

According to the Holy Roman Empire's official feudal law, only men were allowed to rule, and be successors to previous rulers. Since the 13th century, however, when a deceased ruler lacked male descendants, Holy Roman Emperors and Kings of the Romans had often enfeoffed one of his daughters instead of different male relatives or male in-laws, thus introducing cognatic succession. However, in many lands throughout the Holy Roman Empire this new phenomenon was resisted in favour of traditional agnatic (male-only) succession. Moreover, every case of female inheritance still required approval of the feudal overlord by special request; it did not mean every subsequent case would be accepted. In 1204, Philip of Swabia granted Henry I, Duke of Brabant the ius Brabantinum: the right of a woman to become ruler of the duchy if male heirs were lacking. The cognatic principle of hereditary succession to or via female descendants had been applied several times in Brabant ever since, and it had also been applied in the neighbouring counties of Holland, Zealand and Hainaut, amongst others.

In 1354, John III determined that Joanna would inherit all his territories and that Margaret and Mary would be financially compensated. Although John III was not the first Brabantian duke to appoint his daughter as his successor under the ius Brabantinum, still not all parties in mid-14th-century Brabant agreed with this practice. When John died on 5 December 1355, his oldest daughter succeeded him in Brabant and the Duchy of Limburg according to his plan. However, this inheritance settlement was challenged by his sons-in-law in Guelders and Flanders, who demanded a susterdeylinghe (literally 'sister deal'), meaning a territorial partition between the three sisters and thus between Luxemburg, Flanders and Guelders. Before John's death, Louis of Male had tried and failed to gain control over the Lordship of Mechelen (in Brabantian hands since 1347), but now sensed a new opportunity to gain even more.

== War ==
On 15 June 1356, Louis of Flanders declared war on Brabant. The Flemish armies were initially extremely successful. Brussels was besieged and captured. By the end of August 1356, Mechelen, Leuven, Vilvoorde, Antwerp, Grimbergen, Tienen and Nivelles had surrendered to the Flemish. Joanna took refuge in Binche, and later 's-Hertogenbosch. Meanwhile, Reginald III, Duke of Guelders and married to John's third daughter Mary of Brabant, also disputed the succession and made war on Brabant. In 1356, he agreed to recognise Joanna as duchess in exchange for the acquisition of the Lordship of Turnhout and a substantial annual payment from Brabant.

Wenceslaus I, Duke of Luxembourg, husband of Joanna, requested help for Brabant from his brother, Charles IV, Holy Roman Emperor. This was granted in October 1356. On learning of this, a coup d'état took place in Brussels and the Flemish were pushed out. Similar reverses took place in other Brabantian towns.

A peace was signed at Ath on 4 June 1357, brokered by William III, Count of Hainaut. It made concessions to Flanders.

== See also ==
- Everard t'Serclaes
- First War of the Guelderian Succession (1371–1379)
- Joyous Entry of 1356
- War of the Flemish Succession (1244–1254)
- War of the Limburg Succession (1283–1288)
- Wars of the Loon Succession (1336–1366)

== Bibliography ==
- Boffa, Sergio (2004). Warfare in Medieval Brabant, 1356-1406. Woodbridge, Suffolk: Boydell & Brewer. pp. 3–10. ISBN 9781843830610.
- van Bree, Han (1999). Het aanzien van een millennium. Kroniek van historische gebeurtenissen van de Lage Landen 1000–2000. Utrecht: Uitgeverij Het Spectrum. pp. 28–30. ISBN 9027468443.
- Laurent, H.; Quicke, F. (1927). "La guerre de la succession du Brabant (1356-1357)". Revue du Nord. 13 (50): 81–121. doi:10.3406/rnord.1927.1428.
- de Vries, Jenine (April 2012). "'Wildi emmer wesen Fransoyse?'* De rol van vrouwelijke erfopvolging in de opvolgingsstrijd rondom Jan IV van Brabant" (PDF). Leidschrift. 27 (1): 49–63.
