= Joyous entry =

Ceremony to celebrate a reigning monarch's first royal entry into a city

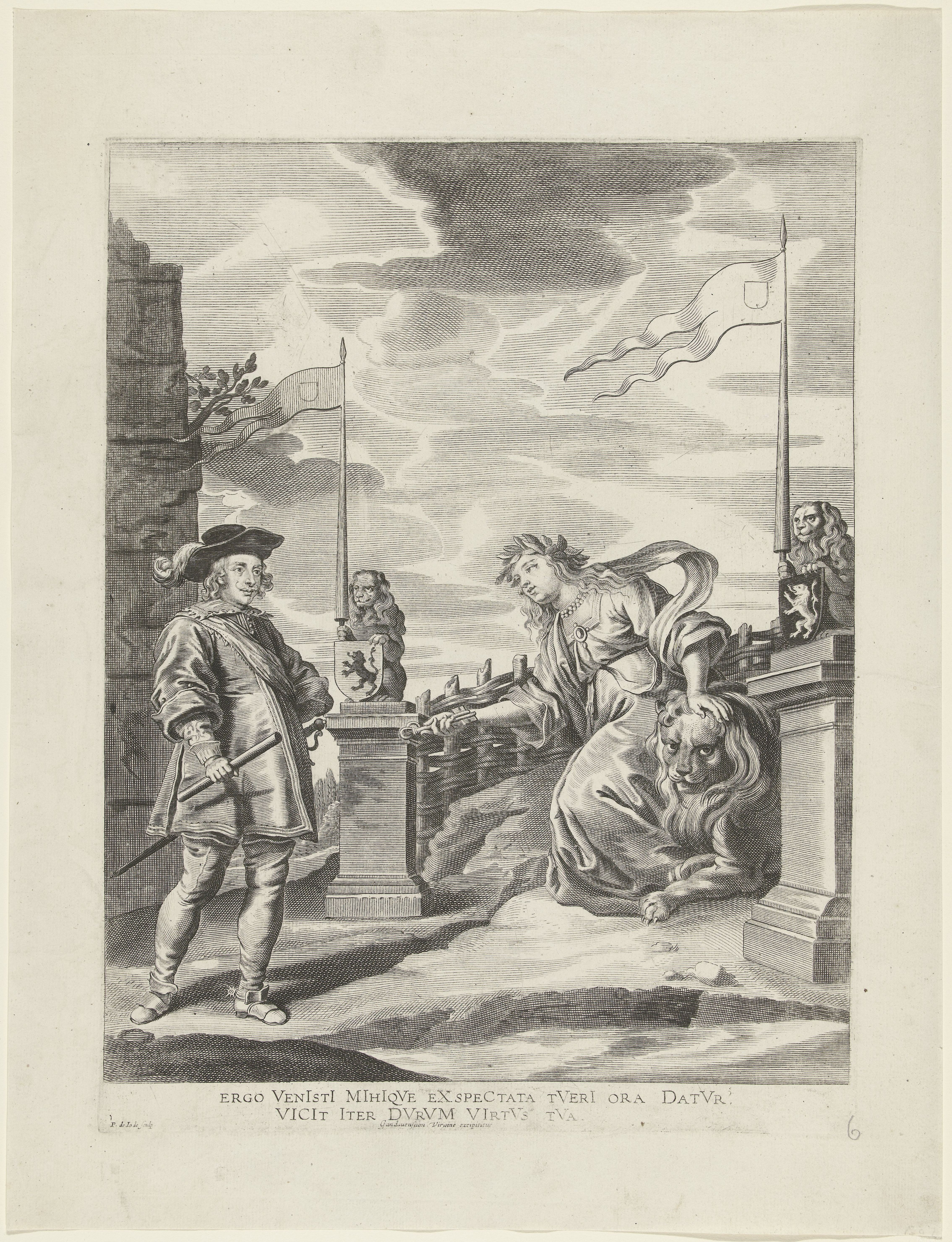
Ferdinand Receives the Keys of the City from the Virgin of Ghent, print after a painting made by Antoon van den Heuvel for the Joyous Entry by the Cardinal-Infante Ferdinand into Ghent in 1635

A joyous entry (Dutch: blijde intrede; French: joyeuse entrée) is a ceremonial event marking the entry into a city by a monarch, prince, duke, or governor in parts of modern-day Belgium. Originating in the Middle Ages, it generally coincided with the affirmation or extension of the city's civic rights and privileges.

Joyous entries are primarily associated with the historic Duchy of Brabant and County of Flanders and continue in modern-day Belgium where the most recent joyous entries took place in 2013. The term is also occasionally used in relation to royal entries in Medieval France, Luxembourg, Hungary, Scotland, and elsewhere.

== Ceremonial reception ==
A Joyous Entry is a particular form of, and title for, the general phenomenon of ceremonial entries into cities by rulers or their representatives, which were celebrated with enormous pageantry and festivities throughout Europe from at least the late Middle Ages on. The leading artists available designed temporary decorated constructions such as triumphal arches, groups of musicians and actors performed on stands at which the procession halted, the houses on the processional route decorated themselves with hangings, flowers were thrown, and fountains flowed with wine. The custom began in the Middle Ages and continued until the French Revolution, although less often in Protestant counties after the Reformation. A formal first visit to a city by an inheritor of the throne of Belgium upon his accession and since 1900 for a crown prince upon his marriage, is still referred to as a "Joyous Entry", a reminder of this tradition of the rule of law.

== Charter of liberties ==
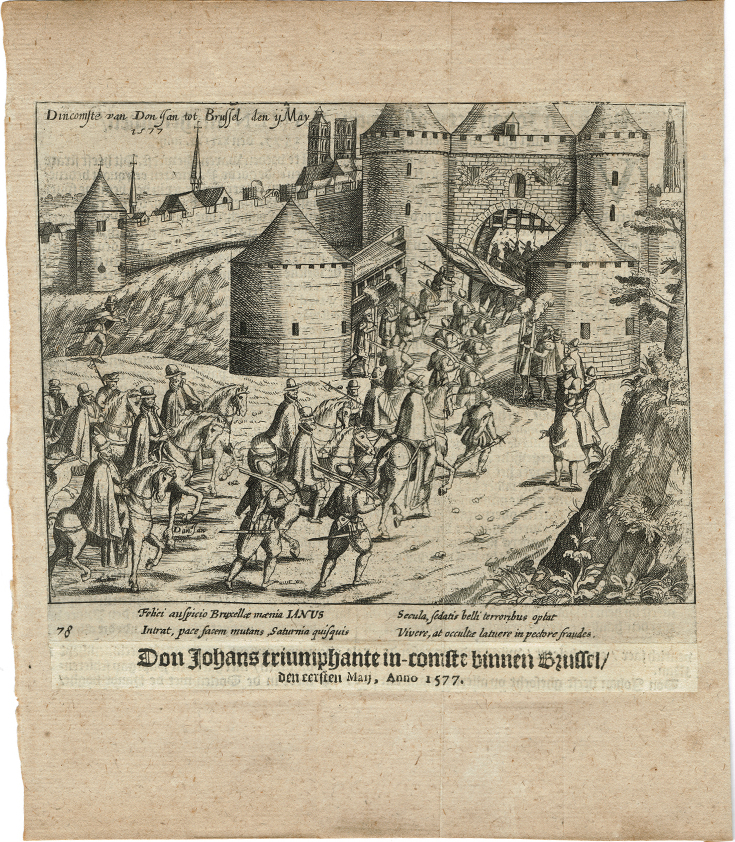
The Joyous Entry of John of Austria into Brussels, 1 May 1577. Print from 'The Wars of Nassau' by W. Baudartius, Amsterdam 1616.

In the Duchy of Brabant the term Joyous Entry was also applied to the charter of liberties that a new ruler was obliged to swear to uphold upon their formal first reception, dating back to the Joyous Entry of 1356. One of the functions of the Council of Brabant was to ensure that new legislation did not contravene or abrogate the liberties established in the Joyous Entry.

== Kingdom of Belgium ==
In Belgium, this ceremonial reception of the new sovereign has continued since 1830. Ceremonial entries are performed by the new royal couple in the capitals of the provinces after the installation of the King. The same goes for the Duke of Brabant, who after his marriage presents the new duchess of Brabant to the public. The most recent Joyous Entries were organised in honour of King Philippe and Queen Mathilde in 2013.

== Notable examples ==
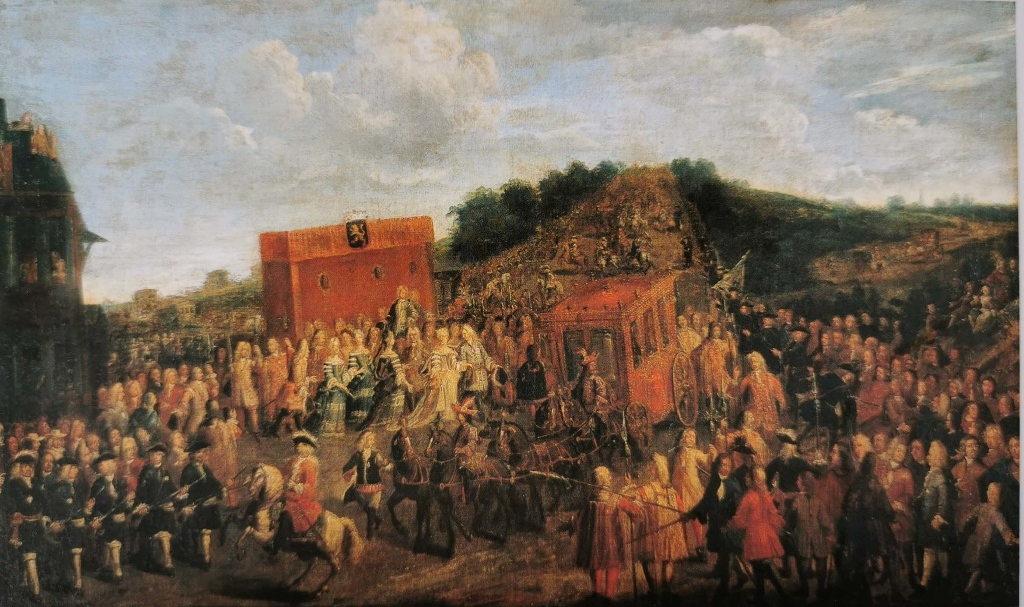
Joyous Entry into Brussels of Archduchess Maria Elisabeth on 9 October 1725 by Andreas Martin

- In 1356, the Joyous Entry into Brussels, by Joanna and her husband Wenceslaus I of Luxembourg, upon her becoming Duchess of Brabant on the death of her father John the Triumphant.
- In 1407?, a Joyous Entry, by John the Fearless.
- In 142?, a Joyous Entry, by Philip the Good.
- In 1464, the Joyous Entry into Sopron, by King Matthias of Hungary, atypically mainly celebrating the return of the object of the Crown.
- In 1467, the (not so very) 'Joyous' Entry into Ghent, by Charles the Bold.
- In 1468, the Joyous Entry into Bruges, by Charles the Bold and Margaret of York.
- In 1478, the Joyous Entry into Antwerp, by Maximilian of Austria.
- In 1493?, the Joyous Entry into Mechelen, by Maximilian of Austria (and his young daughter Margarete)
- In 1496, the Joyous Entry into Brussels, by Joanna the Mad.
- In 1501, a tour of Joyous Entries throughout Hainaut, Picardy, Île-de-France, Champagne, Burgundy and Franche-Comté, by Philibert II of Savoy and Margarete of Austria upon their marriage, and the following year into Bourg-en-Bresse.
- In 1507, the Joyous Entry into Mechelen, by Philibert II's widow Margarete, returning as Regent of the Low Countries.
- In 1515, the Joyous Entries into Bruges, Ghent, Antwerp, and Leiden, by young Prince Charles.
- In 1520, the Joyous Entry into Bruges, by young King Charles
- In 1548, the Joyous Entry into Lyon, by Henry II of France.
- In 1549, a series of Joyous Entries into the Low Countries by Charles V and his son Philip II of Spain in (among other cities) Antwerp, Brussels and Bruges.
- In 1550, the Joyous Entry into Rouen, by Henri II of Valois.
- In the early 1560's, the not so very Joyous Entry into Mechelen, by Granvelle, as Archbishop.
- In 1577, the Joyous Entry into Brussels, by Don John, as Governor of the Spanish Netherlands.
- In 1578, the Joyous Entry into Brussels, by Prince Matthias, later the Magnificent.
- In 1582, the Joyous Entry into Antwerp, Bruges, and Ghent, by François, Duke of Anjou.
- In 1594, the Joyous Entry into Brussels and Antwerp, by Archduke Ernest of Austria
- In 1590, the Entry into Edinburgh, by Anne of Denmark
- In 1599–1600, a tour of Joyous Entries into Leuven, Brussels, Mechlin, Antwerp, Ghent, Bruges, Tournai, etc., by Archduke Albert and the Infanta Isabella.
- In 1635, the Joyous Entry by the Cardinal-Infante Ferdinand into Antwerp (decorations designed by Gaspar Gevartius, Theodoor van Thulden and Rubens) and Ghent.
- On 9 October 1725, Archduchess Maria Elisabeth of Austria made her Joyous Entry into Brussels as regent governor of the Austrian Netherlands.
- In 1891, the Joyous Entry into Luxembourg, by Grand Duke Adolphe and his wife Adelheid.
- On 22 November 1918, King Albert I entered Brussels with the Belgian Army of the Yser after four years of German occupation in World War I.
