= House of Évreux =

Cadet branch of the House of Capet

- Arms of the Count of Evreux
- Parent house: Capetian dynasty
- Country: France, Navarre
- Founded: 1298; 728 years ago
- Founder: Louis, Count of Évreux
- Final ruler: Charles III of Navarre
- Titles: Count of Évreux; King of Navarre; Count of Étampes
- Dissolution: 1425; 601 years ago (agnatic line); 1441; 585 years ago (sole heiress' death)

The House of Évreux was a cadet branch of the Capetian dynasty, the royal house of France, which flourished from the beginning of the 14th century to the mid 15th century. It became the royal house of the Kingdom of Navarre.

The House was founded by Louis, Count of Évreux. He was the third son of Philip III of France, by his second wife Marie of Brabant. His son and heir, Philip, was the husband of Joan II of Navarre and the first King of Navarre from the Évreux dynasty.

Louis' younger son Charles had no grandchildren. The Évreux dynasty ended with the death of Blanche I of Navarre, who died in 1441.

== Notable members of the House of Évreux ==
- Jeanne d'Évreux, Queen of France as the third wife of Charles IV of France, whose failure to produce a son ended the House of Capet
- Philip III of Navarre
- Blanche d'Évreux, Queen of France as the second wife of Philip VI of France
- Charles II of Navarre
- Joan of Navarre, Queen of England as the second wife of Henry IV of England
- Charles III of Navarre
- Blanche I of Navarre

== Family tree ==
Philip III; King of France; HOUSE OF CAPET
Philip IV; King of France, King of Navarre	Charles; Count of Valois; HOUSE OF VALOIS	Louis; Count of Evreux; HOUSE OF ÉVREUX
Louis X King of France, King of Navarre	Charles; Count of Étampes	Philip III; Count of Évreux
Joan II; Queen of Navarre	Louis I Count of Étampes	Charles II; King of Navarre, Count of Évreux	Philip; Count of Longueville	Louis; Count of Beaumont ∞ Joanna, Duchess of Durazzo
Charles III; King of Navarre, Count of Évreux

== See also ==
- List of Navarrese monarchs from the Capetian dynasty
- Navarre monarchs family tree
