= Everard t'Serclaes =

Belgian noble (1320–1388)

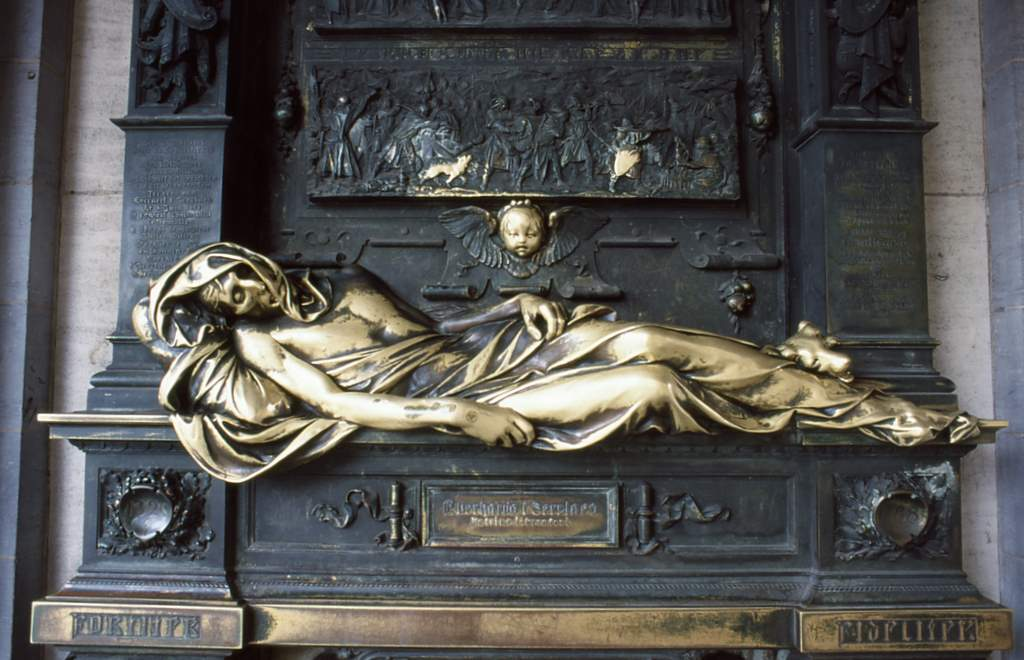
- Everard t'Serclaes memorial in Brussels, by Julien Dillens
- Born: c. 1320
- Died: 31 March 1388; Grand-Place, Brussels, Brabant
- Cause of death: Dismemberment
- Resting place: St Gertrude’s Church, Ternat, Belgium
- Citizenship: Duchy of Brabant
- Spouses: Beatrijs van Essene (died); Elisabeth van der Meeren
- Children: 7
- Parents: Everard t'Serclaes; Avesoete vander Noot
- Relatives: Jean (brother); Niklaas (brother); Geertrui (sister)

Everard t'Serclaes (French: Éverard t'Serclaes; Flemish: Everaard t’Serclaes; c. 1320 – 31 March 1388) was a Brabantian magistrate best known for leading the recapture of Brussels from the Flanders during the War of the Brabantian Succession.

Following his role in the liberation of Brussels, t'Serclaes served four times as a schepen of the city. In 1388, while opposing the transfer of ducal lands to Sweder of Abcoude, he was ambushed and fatally wounded by a group led by Sweder's illegitimate son. His death provoked widespread outrage and led to the destruction of Gaasbeek Castle.

== Early life ==
Little is known about t'Serclaes' early life. He and his brothers were born between April 1306 and September 1315, possibly later, at an unknown location. He was the son of Everard t'Serclaes and Avesoete vander Noot, and had two brothers, Jean and Niklaas, and a sister, Geertrui.

== Military career ==
=== Early years ===
It is generally considered that t'Serclaes pursued a military career following his youth. In 1351, while still a squire, he is recorded as serving King John II of France during the Hundred Years’ War. In recognition of this service, he received an annual pension of ₶100.

=== War of the Brabantian Succession ===
After the death of John III of Brabant on 5 December 1355, his daughter Joanna and her husband Wenceslaus succeeded him as rulers of the duchy. Their succession was disputed by Louis II of Flanders, who invaded Brabant and seized Brussels in August 1356. Following this, t’Serclaes went into exile in Maastricht.

On the night of 24 October 1356, he returned via the Sonian Forest and scaled the city walls of Brussels, leading a group of supporters to expel the Flemish garrison. This enabled Joanna and Wenceslaus to make their Joyous Entry into the city.

=== Later years ===
In 1356, t'Serclaes entered ducal service. He is first explicitly attested as a knight in 1358, although he does not appear to have held a prominent position at the ducal court. Following this period, surviving records provide little information on his activities for several years.

== Political career ==
In the early 1370s, t’Serclaes became active in Brussels politics. He served four times in fifteen, and unlawfully, as schepen of Brussels in 1372, 1377, 1382 and 1387. This repeated officeholding reflects his strong political influence in Brussels during that period.

In 1374, he was one of nine representatives of Brussels who took part in negotiations between the ducal authorities and the Brabantian cities following the Battle of Baesweiler.

== Death ==
T’Serclaes was wounded in Lennik by neighbours of the Lord of Gaasbeek. He was subsequently taken to Brussels, where he received the sacraments and died. He was buried in Ternat outside the city of Brussels.

T’Serclaes was wounded on 26 March 1388 near Lennik by men acting on behalf of Sweder of Abcoude, Lord of Gaasbeek. This occurred against the backdrop of renewed tensions in the region, as Johanna of Brabant faced a prolonged conflict with William I of Guelders and Jülich, which had left her in financial difficulty and prompted discussions about the possible sale of the Mayoralty of Rode. Abcoude, seeking to expand his influence, had proposed the acquisition, but the plan was opposed by the Brussels schepen under t’Serclaes and was ultimately blocked. In retaliation, Abcoude allegedly ordered an ambush in which T’Serclaes was overpowered and severely mutilated.

T’Serclaes was brought to Brussels by John of Stalle, dean of Halle, where he received the sacraments and died in The Star on 31 March 1388. He was buried the St Gertrude’s Church in Ternat, outside the city of Brussels. His killing provoked strong unrest in Brussels, leading to retaliatory action against Gaasbeek Castle, which was attacked and destroyed by Brussels forces. Abcoude fled to Diest and attempted to calm the situation through mediation and the offer of compensation, but this was rejected. According to later tradition, events at Gaasbeek also gave rise to the Brussels nickname “Kiekenfretters”.

At least a year after his death, a clerk recorded in the register of the Chapter of St Gudula that a payment had been made to the chapter, as his burial outside the city infringed upon its burial rights, allowing the chapter to impose a levy.

== Private life ==
He first married Elisabeth van der Meeren, daughter of Brabantian knight Jan van der Meeren; the marriage remained childless. He later married Beatrijs van Essene, a member of an ancient noble family from Flanders, with whom he had six children. His eldest son, also named Everard, succeeded him as Lord of Kruikenburg and later served as steward and councillor to John IV, Duke of Brabant, as well as serving three terms as schepen of Brussels. In 1421, he was beheaded during riots in Brussels. t'Serclaes also had an illegitimate son, Hildebrand.

In 1381, when the Lord of Wezemaal sold him a number of properties, the most important of which was the castle and lordship of Kruikenburg, including Ternat, Sint-Katharina-Lombeek and Wambeek.
