= Sweder of Abcoude =

- Coat of arms according to the Gelre armorial
- Born: circa 1340
- Died: 22 or 23 April 1400; Radda in Chianti
- Other names: Sweder III of Zuylen of Abcoude
- Opponent: Everard t'Serclaes

Sweder III of Zuylen of Abcoude, Lord of Gaasbeek, Putte, Strijen, Wijk, and Durstede ( c.1340 – 22 or 23 April 1400) was a councillor to Joanna, Duchess of Brabant and became infamous for ordering the murder of Everard t'Serclaes.

== Biography ==
He was one of the six mediators that Duchess Joanna chose to negotiate for peace with William I of Guelders and Jülich.

In 1381, part of the lordship of Aa fell to him.

Seeking to annex the bailiwick of Rhode, part of the Quartier de Bruxelles [fr], he had the Brussels alderman Éverard t'Serclaes assassinated in 1388, because opposed his plans. But the people of Brussels besieged and sacked his castle in retaliation.

Sweder died on 12 April 1400, on his way to the celebration of the Holy Year in Rome.

A giant in his likeness him takes part in carnival parades in several towns of Walloon Brabant.

== Family ==
=== Parents ===
Sweder of Abcoude is the son of Gisbert III of Abcoude and Jeanne of Hornes († 1356).

=== Marriage and descent ===
He had three children from his marriage in 1372 with Anne of Leiningen († 1447):

- Jeanne of Abcoude, born around 1376; married on 8 May 1388 with Jean III de Namur, died in 1429.
- Jacques of Abcoude, Lord of Gaasbeek, Putten, Strijen, Abcoude, Wijk, Durstede and Cranendonk, c. 1389-1459; married Jeanne de Ligne in 1415. Their son, Antoine, died of cholera at the age of 9.
- Jola of Abcoude († 1443); married to Hubert V of Culemborg († 1424).

=== Natural children ===
Outside of his marriage, Sweder had 1 more boy and 7 girls:

- Guillaume of Gaasbeek, or of Clèves, born around 1365; married on 3 December 1395 with Marguerite Fraybaert; without descendants. He was one of Everard t'Serclaes' aggressors.
- Clémentine of Gaasbeek, born circa 1365; married to Jean van de Voorde
- Bélia of Gaasbeek, born circa 1365; married to Gérard de Facuez, Lord of Muelesteen
- Reyner of Gaasbeek, born circa 1366; married in 1383 to Henri van Zuut Oert
- Béatrisen of Gaasbeek, born circa 1366; married in 1380 to Jan van der Borch
- Sophie of Gaasbeek, married around 1428 with Hendrick van Lockhorst
- Ida of Gaasbeek, died in 1444; married to Jean van Stalle
- Mobilia of Gaasbeek, died in 1418.

== Bibliography ==
- Sergio Boffa, Le différend entre Sweder d'Abcoude et la ville de Bruxelles : la chute du château de Gaesbeek (mars-avril 1388), in : Les Pays-Bas bourguignons, histoire et institutions (Mélanges André Uyttebrouck), Brussels, 1996, p. 83-104 (disponible sur Academia.edu).
- Histoire du château de Gaasbeek, read online.
- Généalogie de Sweder d'Abcoude, read online.
- H. C. Van Parijs, Sweder d'Abcoude, seigneur de Gaasbeek et sa descendance, L'Intermédiaire : bulletin du service de centralisation des études généalogiques et démographiques de Belgique, 1951, vol. 6, p. 353-359 et 413-422; 1952, vol. 7, p. 1-7, p. 69-75, 113-117 et 167-169.
