= Marie of Évreux =

Duchess of Brabant (1303–1335)

Marie d'Évreux
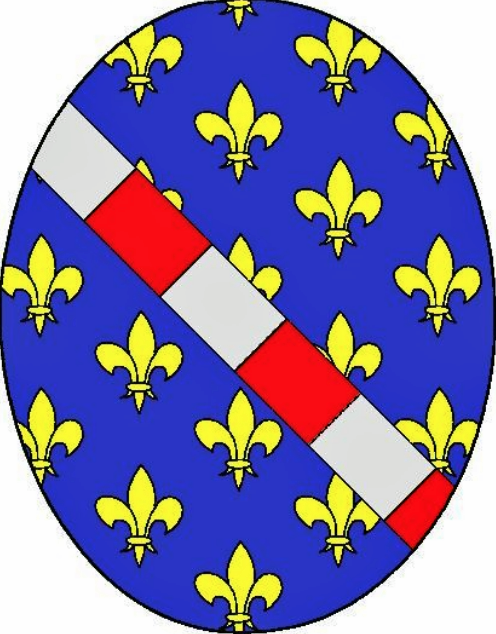
- Marie d'Évreux
- Born: 1303
- Died: 31 October 1335
- Noble family: Capet
- Spouse: John III, Duke of Brabant (m. 1311)
- Issue: Joanna, Duchess of Brabant; Margaret of Brabant; Marie of Brabant; John; Henry; Godfrey
- Father: Louis d'Évreux
- Mother: Margaret of Artois

Marie d'Évreux (1303 – October 31, 1335) was the eldest child of Louis d'Évreux and his wife Margaret of Artois. She was a member of the House of Capet.

She was Duchess of Brabant by her marriage to John III, Duke of Brabant. Her paternal grandmother being Marie of Brabant, she was a great-granddaughter of Henry III, Duke of Brabant and so, her husband's second cousin.

Marie was the eldest of five children born to her parents. Marie's younger siblings included: Charles d'Évreux; Lord of Étampes, Philip III of Navarre; husband of Joan II of Navarre, and Jeanne d'Évreux; Queen of France by her marriage to Charles IV of France.

== Marriage ==
In 1311, Marie married John III, Duke of Brabant as his father's gesture of rapprochement with France. They had:

- Joanna, Duchess of Brabant (1322–1406)
- Margaret of Brabant (February 9, 1323 – 1368), married at Saint-Quentin on June 6, 1347 Louis II of Flanders
- Marie of Brabant (1325 – March 1, 1399), Lady of Turnhout, married at Tervuren on July 1, 1347 Reginald III of Guelders
- John (1327–1335/36)
- Henri (d. October 29, 1349)
- Godfrey (d. aft. February 3, 1352)

Marie's daughter Joanna was the first woman to be Duchess of Brabant in her own right.

Marie died October 31, 1335, aged thirty-one or thirty-two.

== Sources ==
- Boffa, Sergio (2004). Warfare in Medieval Brabant, 1356-1406. The Boydell Press.
- de Venette, Jean (1953). Newhall, Richard A. (ed.). The Chronicle of Jean de Venette. Translated by Birdsall, Jean. Columbia University Press.
