= Louis, Count of Évreux =

French prince (1276–1319)

Louis
- Count of Évreux
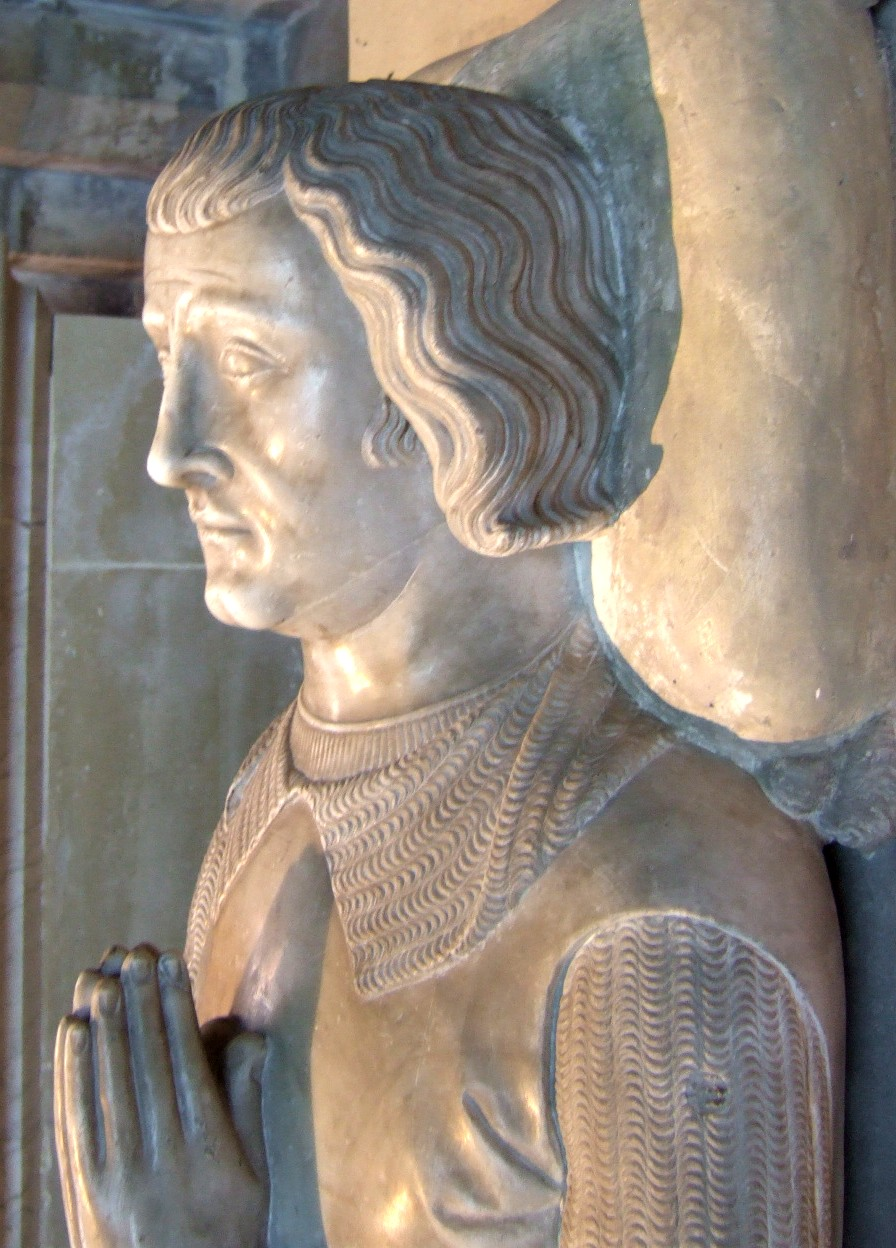
- Tomb effigy of Louis d'Evreux now in the Basilica of St Denis (he was buried in the now-demolished church of the Couvent des Jacobins in Paris)
- Born: 3 May 1276
- Died: 19 May 1319 (aged 43); Paris
- Spouse: Margaret of Artois
- Issue: Marie, Duchess of Brabant; Charles, Count of Étampes; Philip III, King of Navarre; Margaret, Countess of Auvergne; Joan, Queen of France
- House: House of Évreux (founder)
- Father: Philip III of France
- Mother: Marie of Brabant

Louis of Évreux (3 May 1276 – 19 May 1319) was a Capetian prince and count of Évreux. He was the only son of King Philip III of France and his second wife Marie of Brabant, and thus a half-brother of King Philip IV.

Louis had a quiet and reflective personality and was politically opposed to the scheming of his half-brother Charles of Valois. He was, however, close with his nephew Philip V. He was among the negotiators of the 1303 Treaty of Paris that ended the 1294–1303 Gascon War.

== Marriage and issue ==
Louis married Margaret of Artois, daughter of Philip of Artois and sister of Robert III of Artois. They had:

1. Marie (1303 – 31 October 1335), married John III, Duke of Brabant in 1311
2. Charles (d. 1336), Count of Étampes married Maria de la Cerda, Lady of Lunel, daughter of Fernando de la Cerda.
3. Philip III of Navarre (1306–1343), married Joan II of Navarre.
4. Margaret (1307–1350), married in 1325 William XII of Auvergne
5. Joan (1310–1370), married Charles IV of France

Louis, Count of Évreux House of Capet Born: 3 May 1276 Died: 19 May 1319
Vacant Royal domain Title last held by Amaury IV	Count of Évreux; 1298–1319	Succeeded by Philip
