= Gaasbeek Castle =

Castle in Lennik, Belgium

- Kasteel van Gaasbeek (Dutch); Château de Gaesbeek (French)
- Lennik, Flemish Brabant
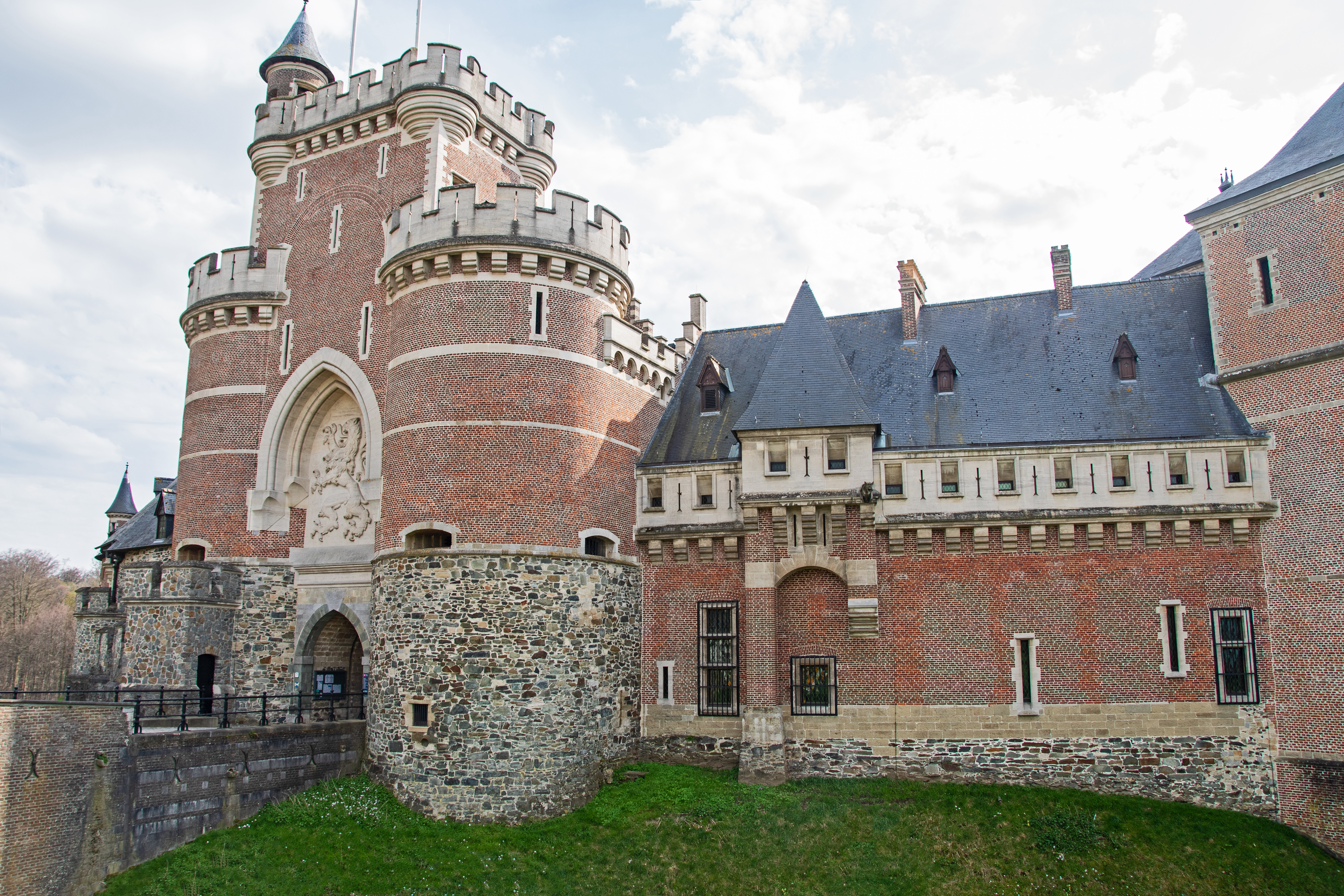
- Gaasbeek Castle's gatehouse

Site information
- Type: Castle
- Owner: House Pelgrims de Bigard
- Condition: Restored

Location
- Coordinates: 50°47′48″N 4°11′50″E

Site history
- Built: Original castle: 1240; Modern castle: 16th century Restored: 1898
- Materials: Brick

Gaasbeek Castle (Dutch: Kasteel van Gaasbeek; French: Château de Gaesbeek) is a castle located in Lennik, Flemish Brabant, Belgium. Nowadays, it serves as a national museum. It is surrounded by a park.

== History ==
The fortified castle was erected around 1240 to defend the Duchy of Brabant against the County of Flanders. The castle was destroyed, however, by Brussels city troops in revenge for the assassination of Everard t'Serclaes, which was allegedly commanded by the Lord of Gaasbeek at the time, Sweder of Abcoude.

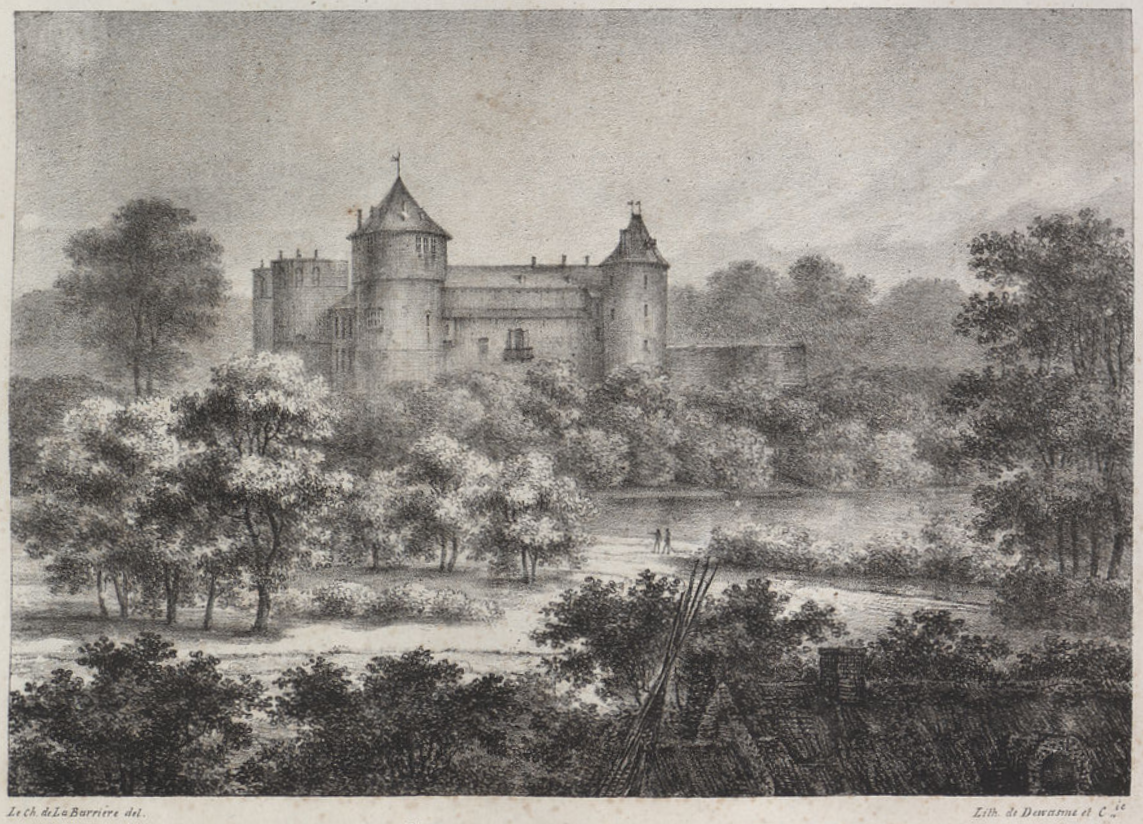
Gaasbeek Castle in a lithograph by Prosper de la Barrière (1823)

At the beginning of the 16th century, the Dominium of Gaesbeeck was inherited by the House of Hornes; they constructed a brick castle on the ruins of the medieval fortress. In 1565, Lamoral, Count of Egmont, acquired the castle and its domain, including feudal rights in 17 surrounding villages. Accused of high treason by Philip II of Spain, the Count of Egmont was beheaded three years later on the Grand-Place/Grote Markt (main square) of Brussels.

In the following centuries, the castle was inhabited by several noble lords, amongst them René de Renesse, 1st Count of Warfusée, who acquired the castle and restored the buildings. It obtained its pseudo-medieval appearance as the result of a renovation during the years 1887–1898. The works were executed by the architect Charles Albert and ordered by the Marquise Arconati-Visconti (née Marie Peyrat) who owned the castle at that time, having inherited it from her husband. At her death in 1923, the Marquise donated the castle to the Belgian state, including the art collection and the grounds.

== Museum ==
Since 1980, the castle has been owned by the Flemish Community (Vlaamse Gemeenschap). The castle contains impressive art collections displayed in lavishly decorated historical rooms. A remarkable collection piece is the authentic testament of the famous painter Peter Paul Rubens. The castle and its grounds (a park of 50 hectares or 124 acres) are open to the public.

From 30 August 2020 to 2023, the museum was closed due to renovation works to the castle. The park and the garden remained accessible during this period.

== Gallery ==
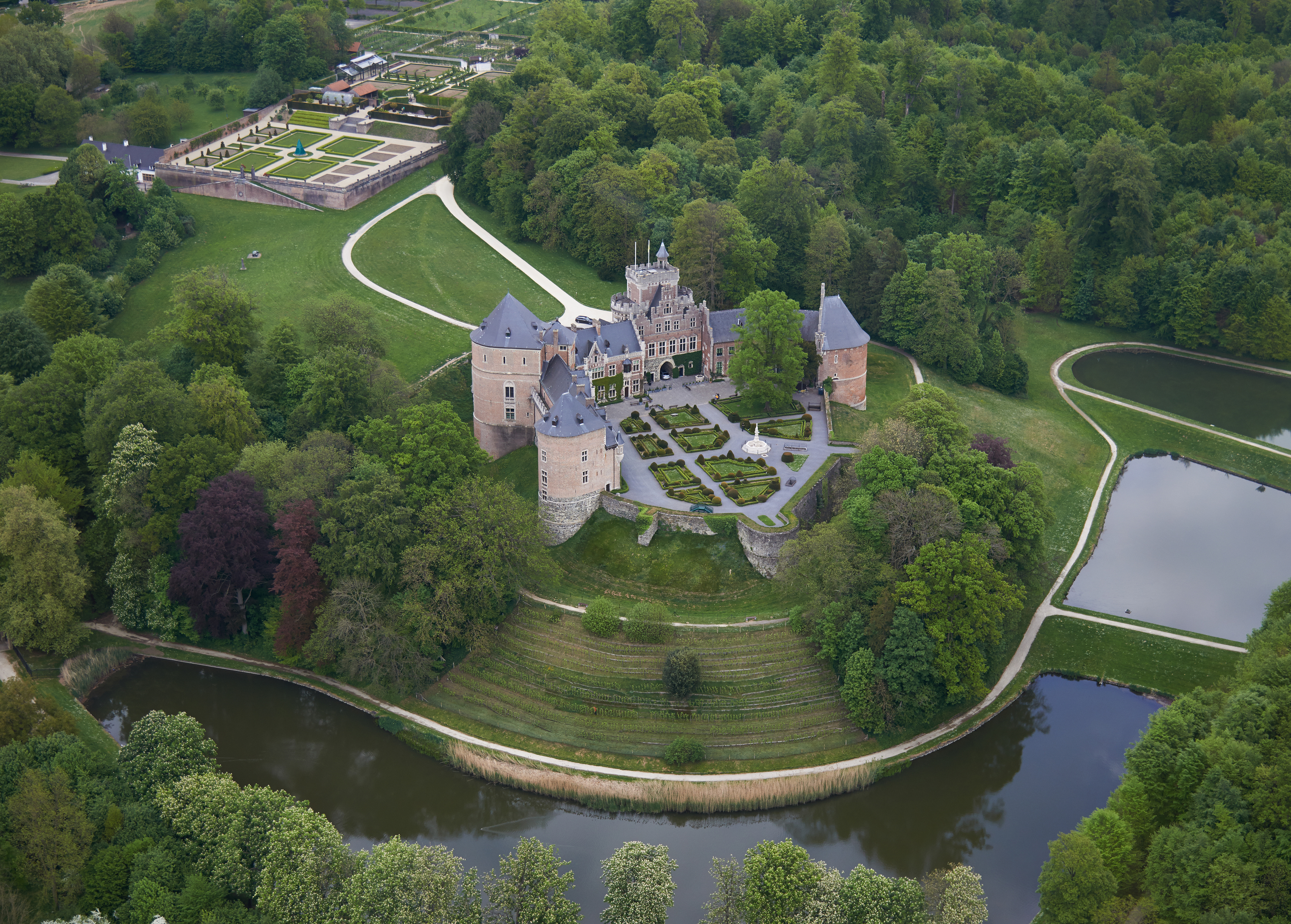
Aerial view

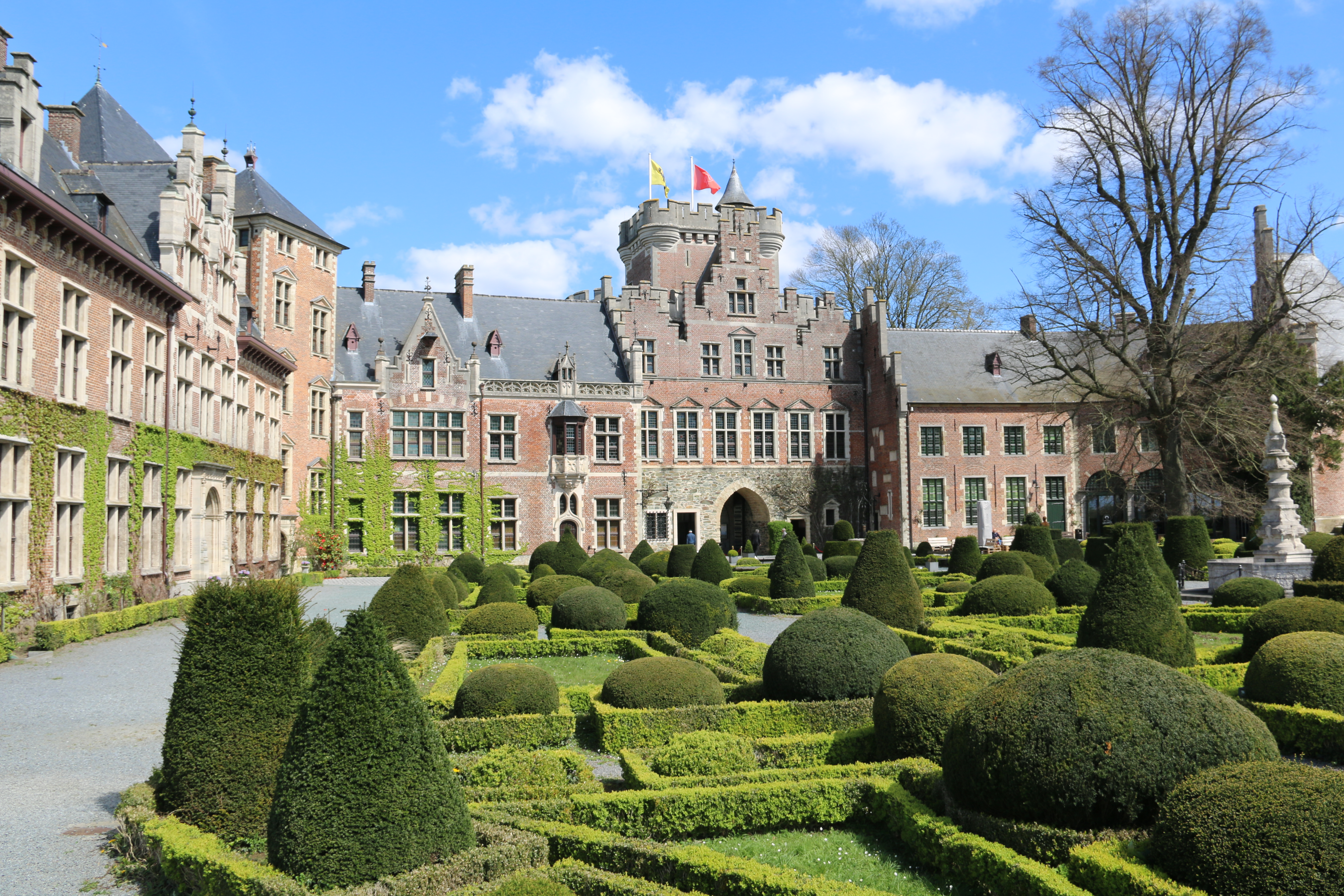
The courtyard

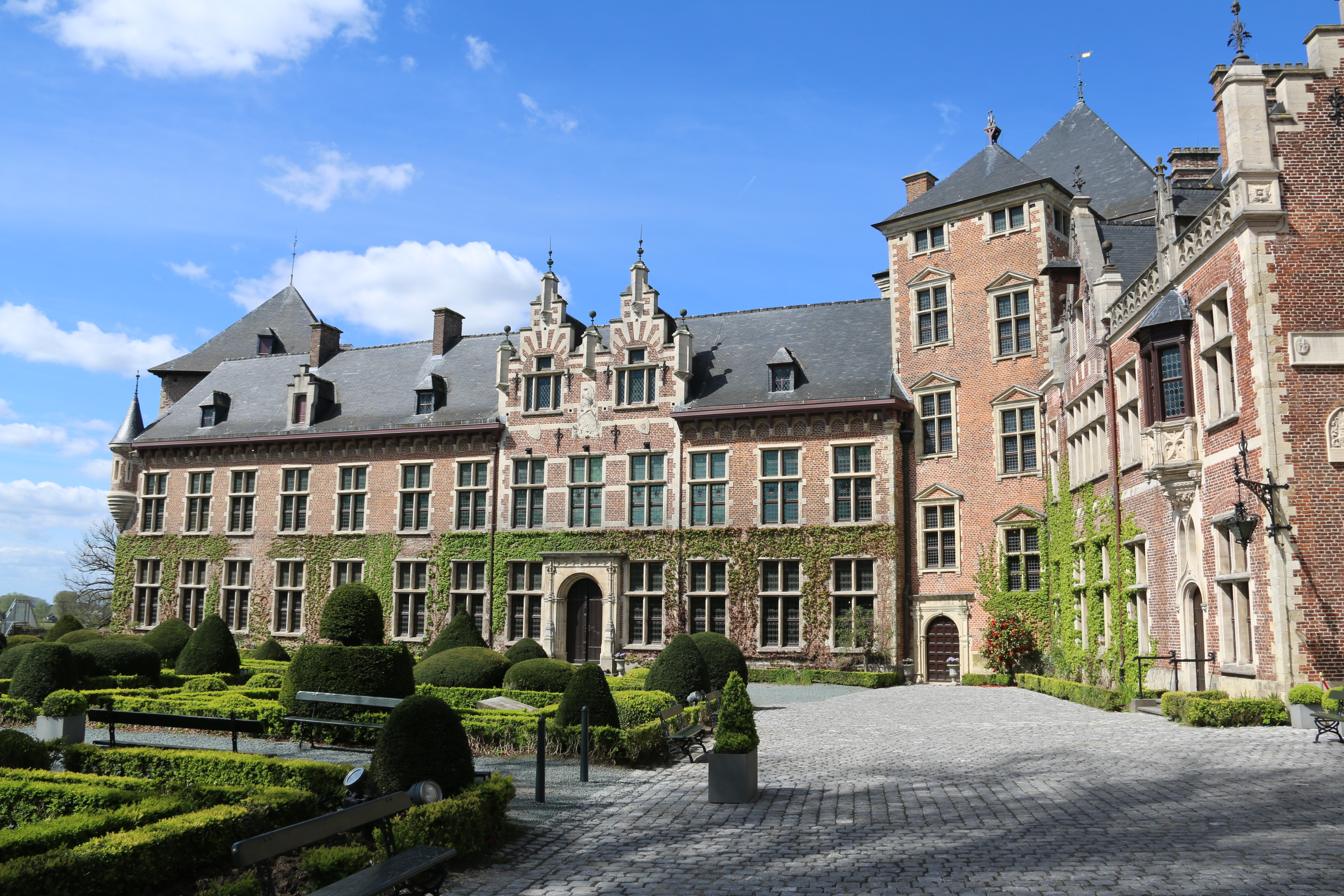
Rear façade of the right wing

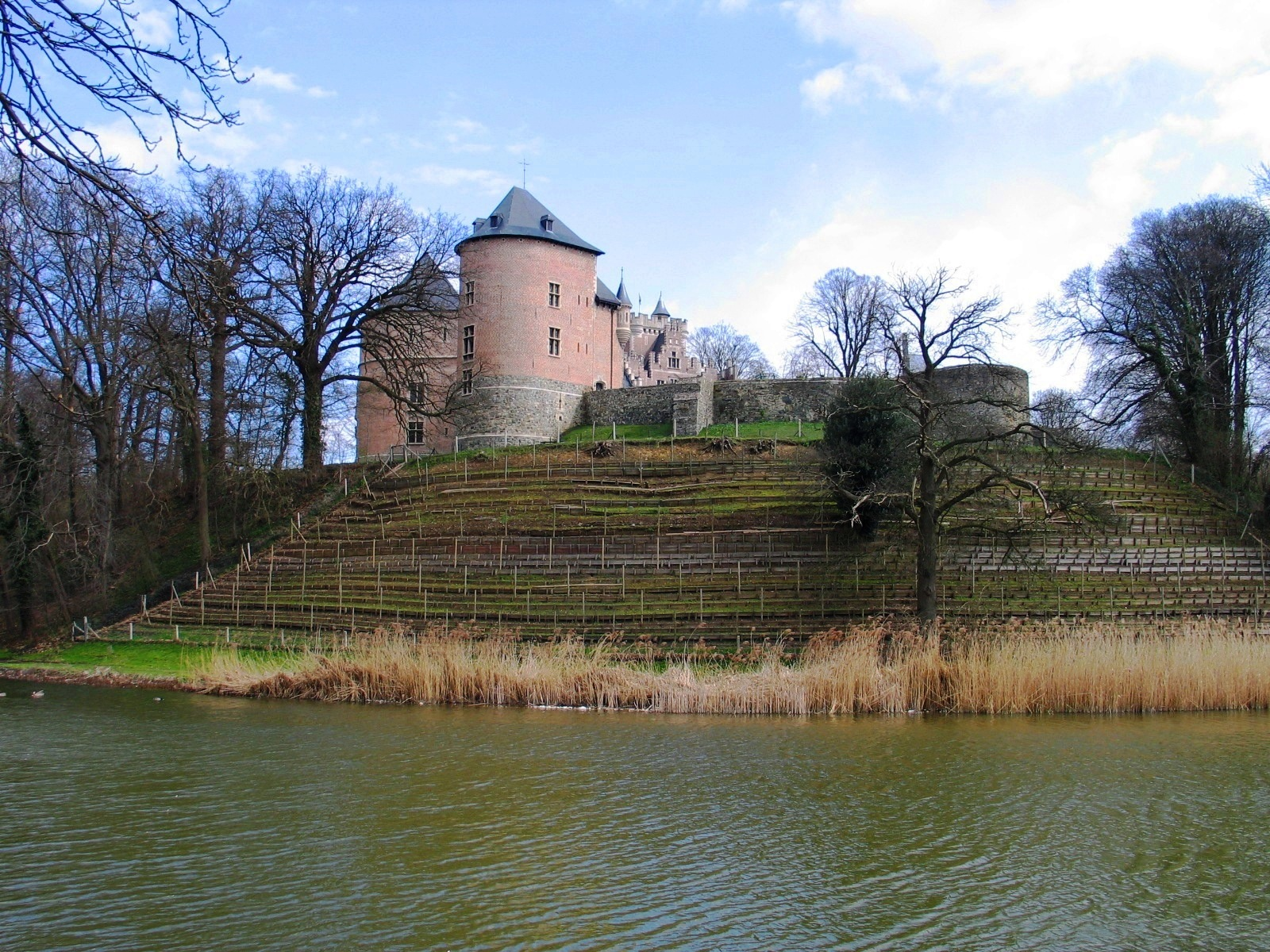
View from the pond

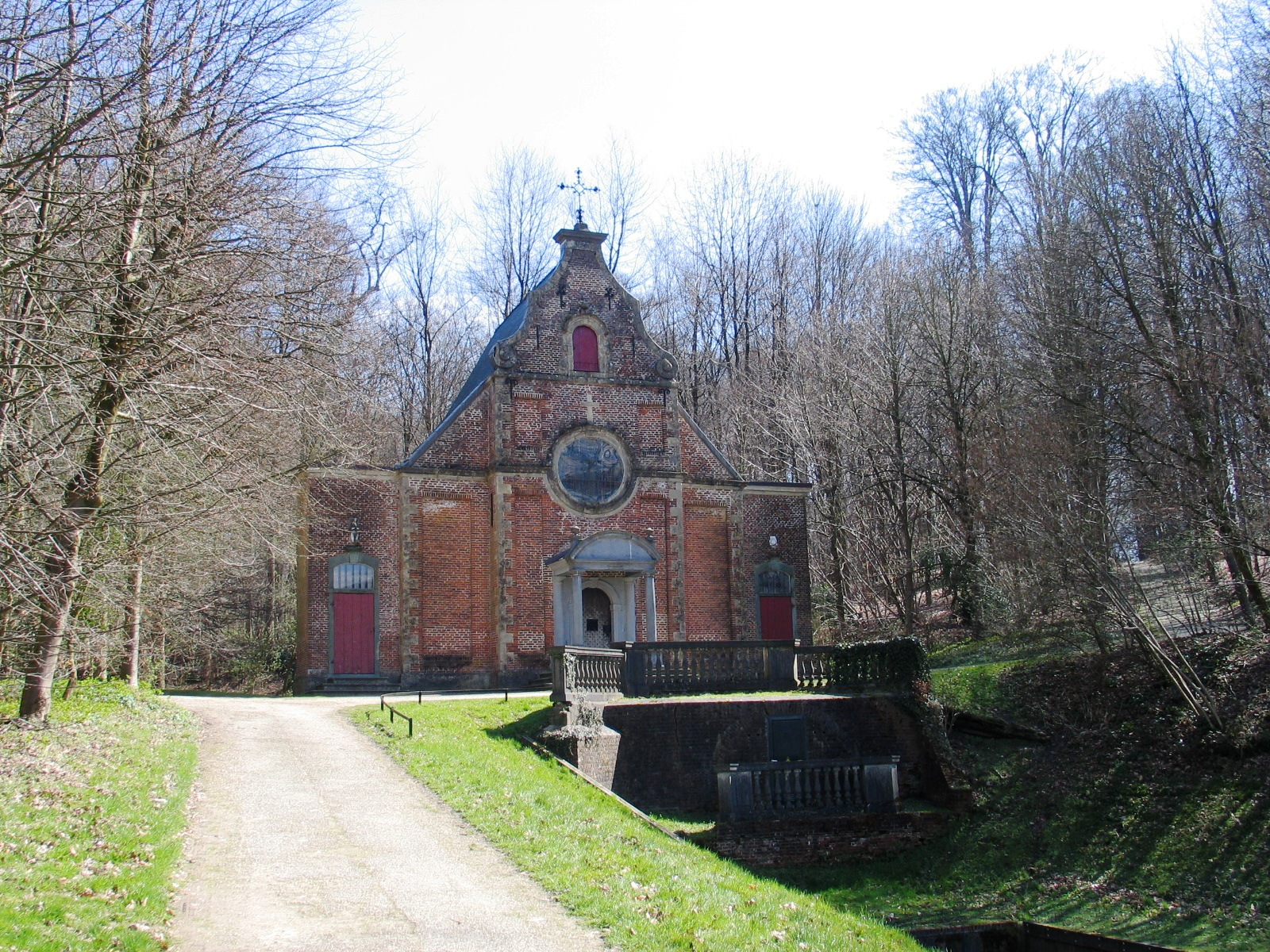
St. Gertrude's Chapel

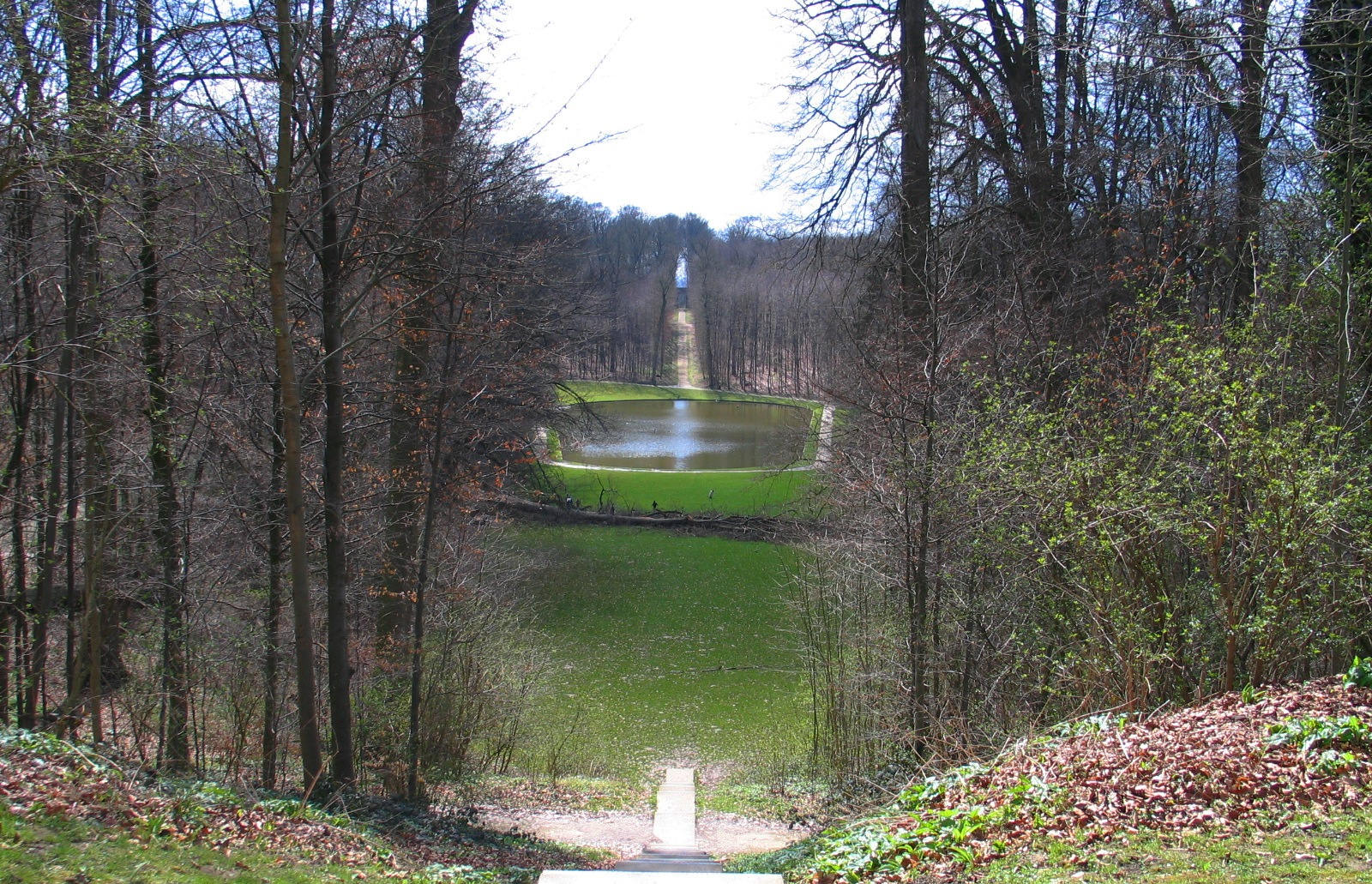
The park with the triumphal arch at the end

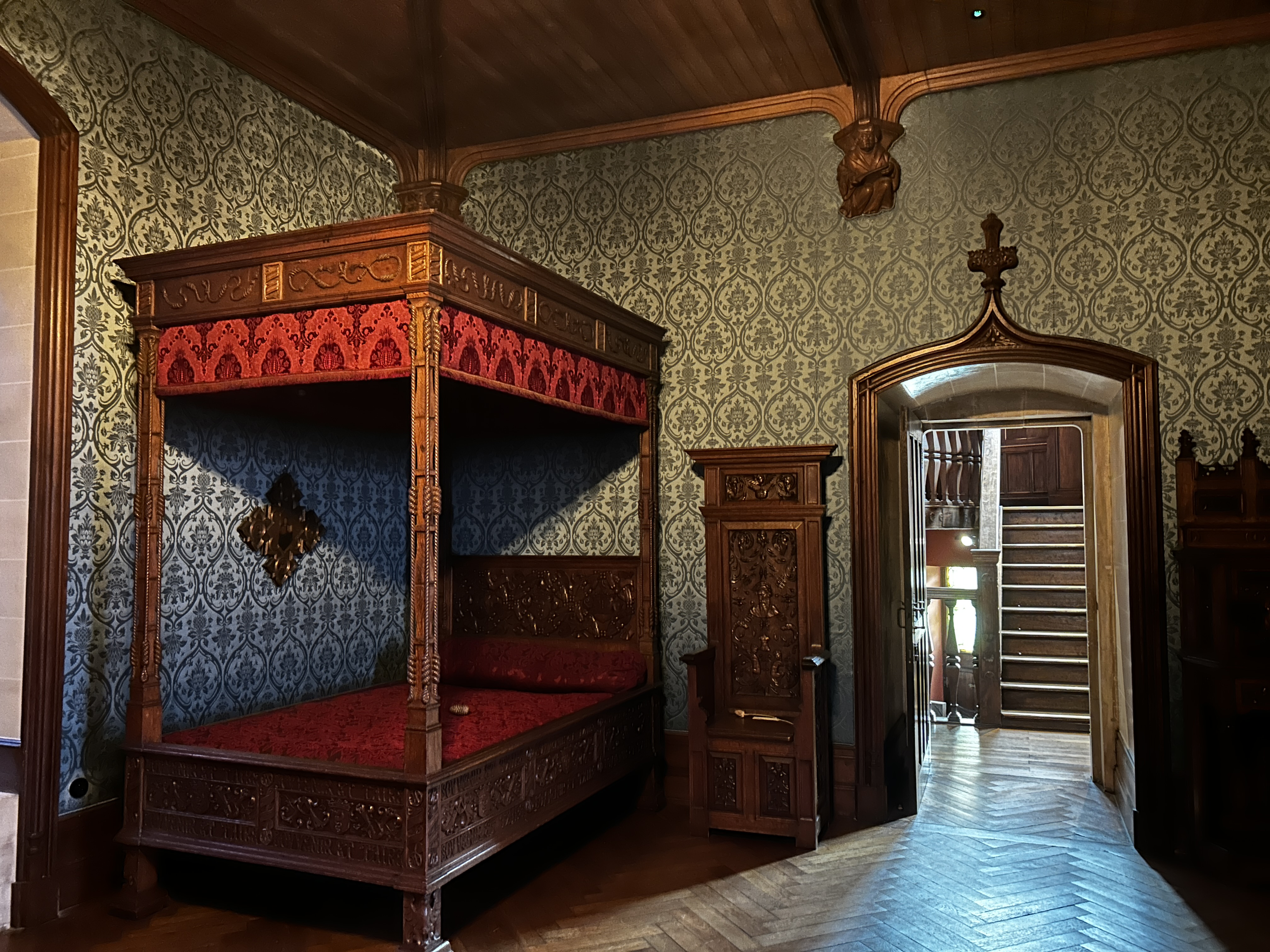
Blue Room

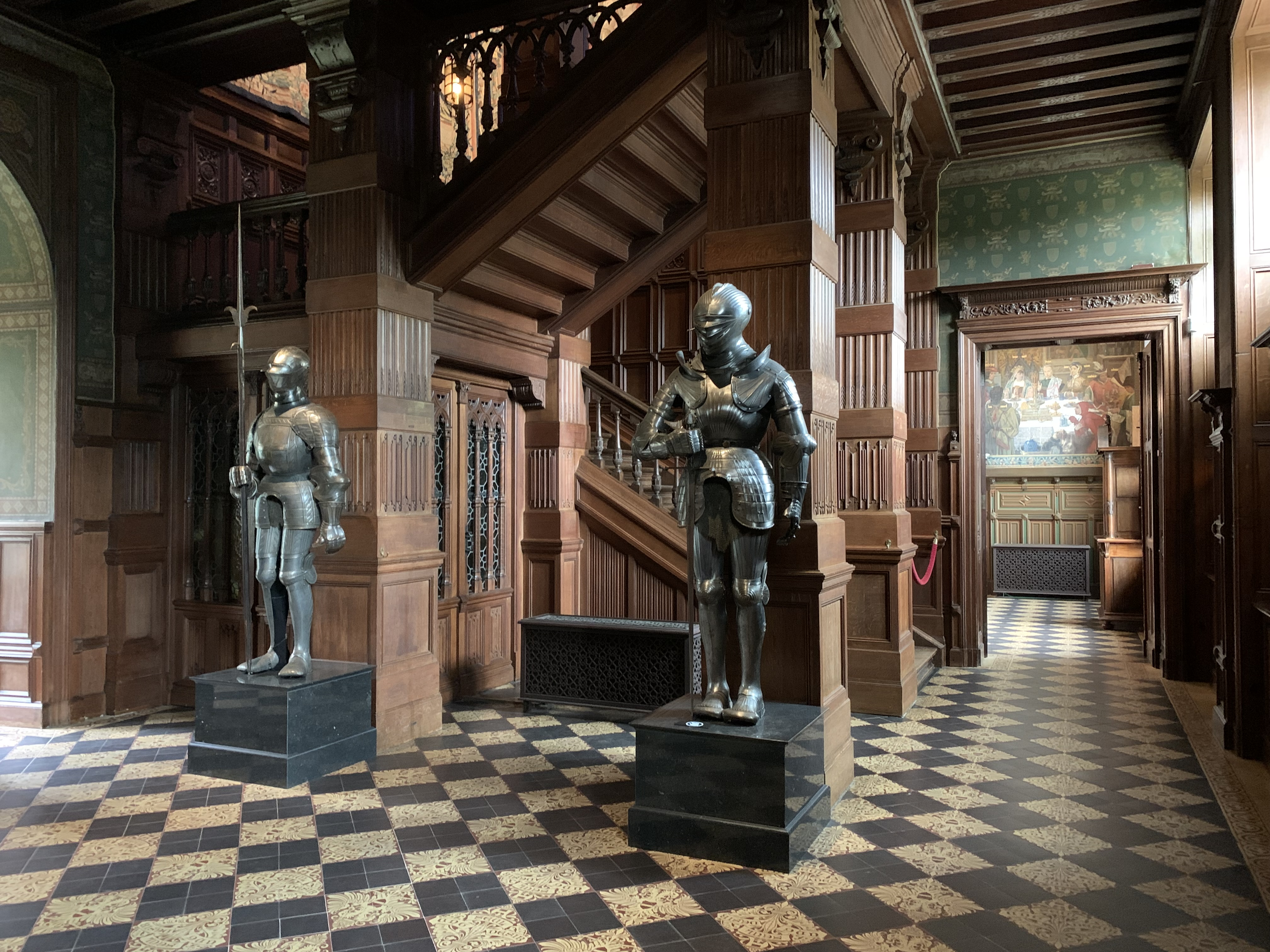
Guard Room

== See also ==
- List of castles and châteaux in Belgium
- Beersel Castle
- Groot-Bijgaarden Castle
