= Jean t'Serclaes =

- Church: Catholic
- Diocese: Diocese of Cambrai
- See: Nôtre Dame Sainte Marie de Cambrai
- Elected: 1 July 1378
- Predecessor: Gérard de Dainville
- Successor: André de Luxembourg

Orders
- Consecration: 26 November 1378

Personal details
- Born: before 1325 Brussels, Duchy of Brabant, Holy Roman Empire
- Died: January 12, 1389 Cambrai, Cambrésis, Holy Roman Empire
- Education: University of Orléans

Jean t'Serclaes (died 1389) was a bishop of Cambrai during the Western Schism. He was the brother of Everard t'Serclaes, the liberator of Brussels.

== Life ==
T'Serclaes was born in Brussels and graduated from the University of Orléans as doctor of both laws around 1349. He was appointed a canon in Utrecht in 1350, and official of the diocese of Cambrai in 1352. He held a plurality of benefices in a number of towns, including Antwerp, Nivelles and Brussels. On 10 October 1377, he founded the house of Bons Enfants in Brussels.

After the death of Gérard de Dainville, bishop of Cambrai, the cathedral chapter elected t'Serclaes as his successor on 1 July 1378. Antipope Clement VII confirmed the election on 5 November 1378, and t'Serclaes was consecrated in Cambrai on 26 November. Pope Urban VI contested the election, seeking to install Arnold II of Horne, bishop of Liège, in the see, but t'Serclaes retained possession.

On 11 April 1385, in Cambrai, t'Serclaes presided at the dynastic double wedding of John of Burgundy and William of Bavaria to one another's sisters, Margaret of Bavaria and Margaret of Burgundy respectively, in the presence of Charles VI of France.

Bishop t'Serclaes died in Cambrai on 12 January 1389.

Catholic Church titles
Preceded by Gérard de Dainville	Bishop of Cambrai; 1378–1389	Succeeded by André de Luxembourg
