= Joyous Entry of 1356 =

Charter of liberties

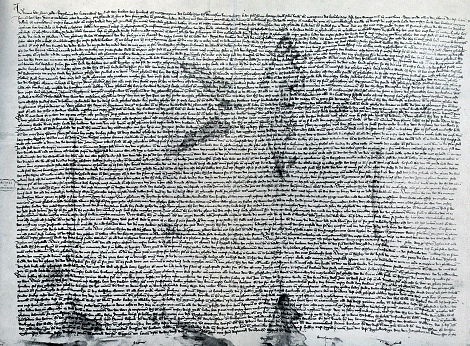
Original joyous entry of 1356

The Joyous Entry of 1356 (Dutch: Blijde Inkomst, French: Joyeuse Entrée) is the charter of liberties granted to the burghers of the Duchy of Brabant by Duchess Joanna and her husband Duke Wenceslaus in the context of their joyous entry as rulers of the duchy. The document is dated 3 January 1356, (NS) and it is seen as the equivalent of Magna Carta for the Low Countries.

== Background ==
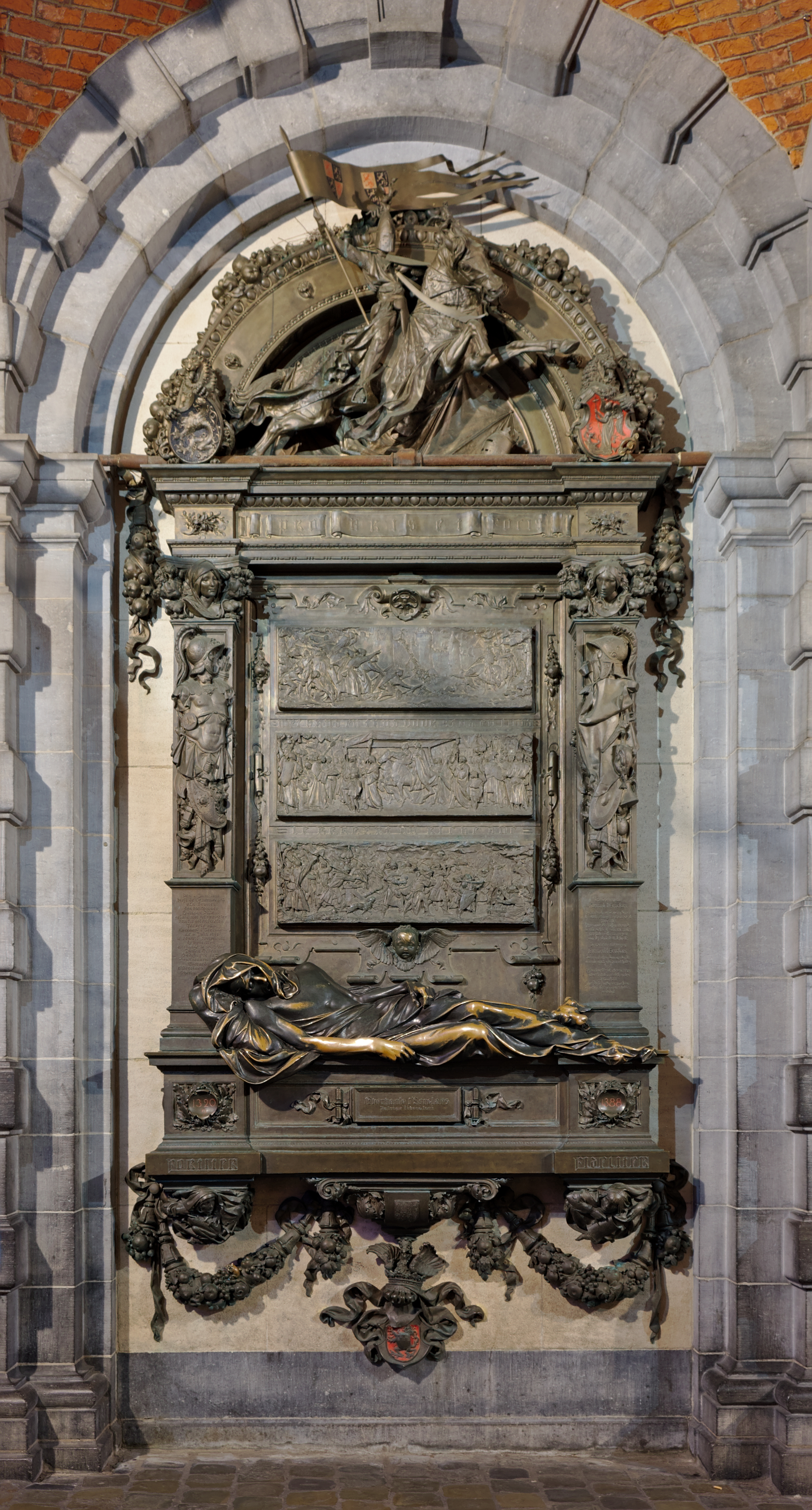
Everard 't Serclaes monument in Brussels. 't Serclaes made the Joyous Entry possible by retaking Brussels from the Flemings.

In 1354, Duke John III summoned representatives of the cities of the duchy to Leuven to announce the marriage of his oldest daughter and heiress Joanna to Wenceslaus I, Duke of Luxembourg, and offered them liberal concessions so as to secure their assent to the change of dynasty. John's death in 1355 sparked a succession crisis. In January 1356, Wenceslaus and Joanna signed the charter that had been drawn up and solemnly swore to uphold its provisions.

Louis II, Count of Flanders, had married Joanna's younger sister Margaret and claimed Brabant in her right. Louis invaded Brabant and quickly seized Brussels. By August 1356, the Brabantian document was a dead letter in practice, owing to the military occupation of Brabant by Louis. During the night of 24 October 1356, a group of Brabantian patriots led by Everard 't Serclaes scaled the city walls and drove the Flemings from the city. This enabled Joanna and Wenceslaus to make their joyous entry into Brussels, giving the document its name.

== Content ==
The charter had not been completely new. A custom of "landcharters" originating in Brabant during the previous century, had already produced the Charter of Kortenberg, granted by John II in 1312 and also considered a Brabantian Constitution, or the "Walloon Charter" of 1314. The six specific freedoms or "privileges" detailed powers granted to the church, the towns and some nobles, by means of which Duchess Joanna and Duke Wenceslaus could collect taxes.

With the instrument, the dukes of Brabant undertook to maintain the indivisibility of the duchy, and not to wage war, make treaties, or impose taxes without the consent of their subjects, as represented by the municipalities. All members of the duke's council were to be native-born Brabanters.

== Aftermath ==
On 5 April, Wenceslaus' half-brother Charles IV became Holy Roman Emperor; he presided at the Imperial Diet which decreed the Golden Bull of 1356, fixing an important aspect of the constitutional structure of the Holy Roman Empire, mainly restricting the freedoms of cities and civilians.

The following February, when Charles, Joanna and Wenceslaus, and representatives of the Brabantian towns all met at Maastricht: to satisfy the Luxembourg dynasty it was officially denigrated by all parties, especially its chapter vii, which stipulated that the Duchess Joanna, if childless, should be succeeded by her natural heirs, her sisters. Thus, it was by abrogation of the Joyous Entry of 1356 that the Habsburgs eventually inherited Brabant. The defeat of Wenceslaus in 1371 was a victory for the towns over the feudal nobility, and in supporting Joanna's grandnephew Anthony of Burgundy as duke, the towns wrung from him a new constitution or Inauguration Charter (1406). What remained of the Joyous Entry charter would nevertheless be referred to for centuries.

The Joyous Entry of 1356 has been viewed an equivalent to the later German rechtsstaat concept and particularly to Magna Carta, the only other medieval document with claims to comprise a written basis of governance, in the other early successful example of a nation-state. In common with Magna Carta, Joyous Entry's functioning significance was retroactively exaggerated by the Romantic historians of the 19th century. It remained of some significance throughout the centuries however, as annually the Dukes of Brabant pledged to adhere to the text in the document by making a ceremonial entry into the main cities of Brabant. In the midst of the Eighty Years' War in the Low Countries, a book was repeatedly published (the 1578 edition safely from Cologne) with the Latin title Laetus introitus, with the view of reminding Spanish king Philip II and his military commanders of the constitutional restraints of the Joyous Entry and giving heart to the insurgents in Brabant. Later, the ill-advised attempt of the 18th century Austrian Emperor Joseph II in his reforming zeal to abrogate the Joyous Entry caused a revolt in Brabant, before which he had to yield.

This Joyous Entry charter was declared null and void when the Revolutionary French forces took possession of the Austrian Netherlands in 1794. Nevertheless, it became one of the elements that formed the Belgian Constitution of 1831.

== See also ==
- Golden Bull of 1356
