= Andreas Martin (painter) =

Flemish painter and draughtsman

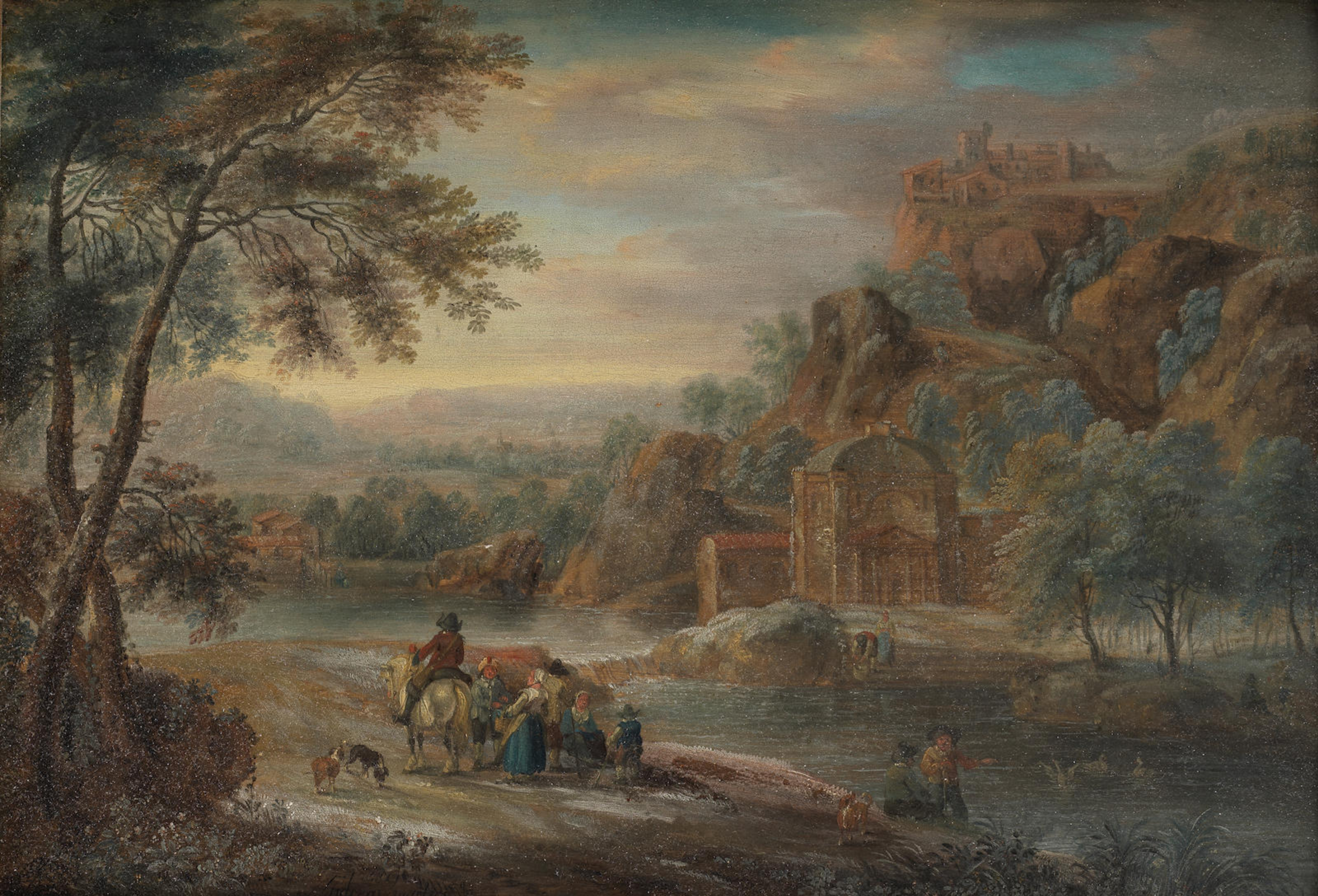
Mountainous river landscape with figures on a path

Andreas Martin or Andreas Marten (Brussels, 1699 – Brussels, 1763) was a Flemish painter and draughtsman. He is known for his imaginary landscape paintings, topographical landscapes, cityscapes of Brussels and its environs and rural genre scenes. He lived and worked in Brussels.

== Life ==
He was born in Brussels as the son of a tailor. There is no record of his training. He was registered as a master painter at the Brussels Guild of St Luke in 1721.

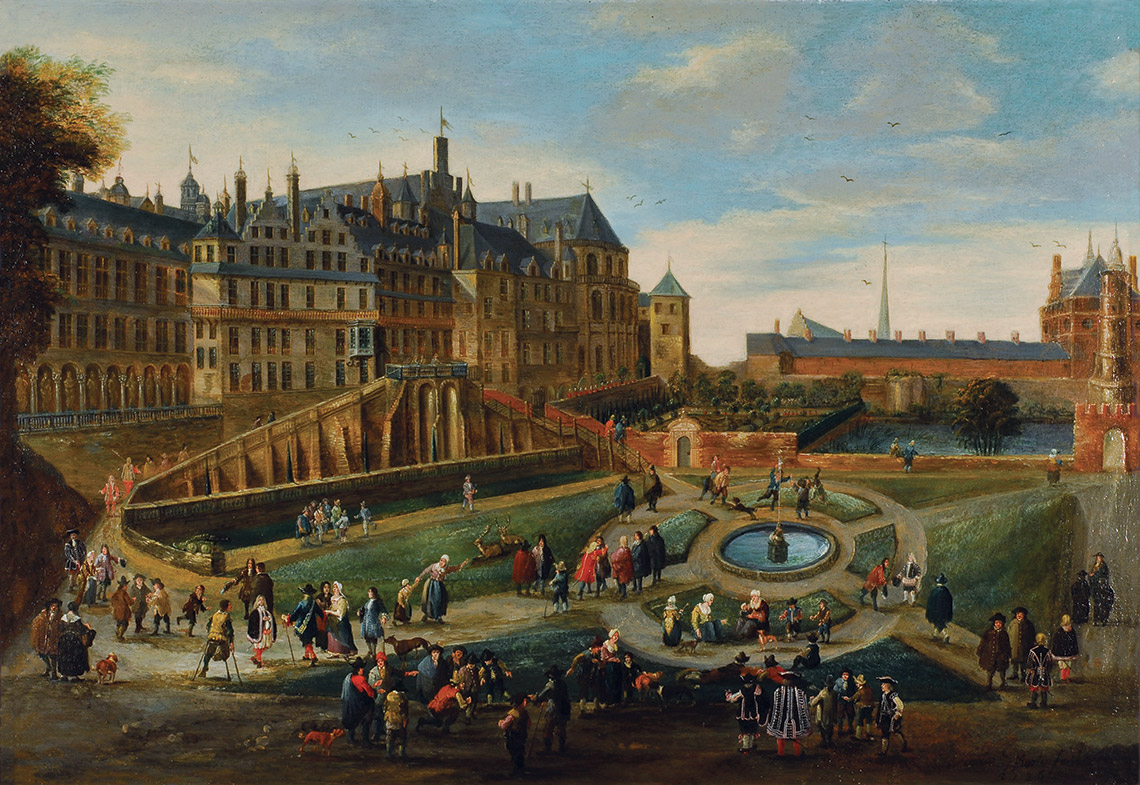
Palace of Coudenberg in Brussels

He owned a house in the Saint-Anna Street in Brussels, which was his home, studio and probably also place of business. He likely was active as an art and antique dealer as witnessed by the sale in 1742 of works of art (mainly on paper), books, curiosities and furniture at that address. In 1725, Martin was mentioned as an amateur at the Academy of Fine Arts of Brussels. Martin owned an art cabinet and is mentioned among 'those who are always looking for the most excellent pieces in painting, sculpture and printmaking' in Le peintre amateur et curieux, authored by Guillaume Pierre Mensaert and published in 1763.

He had a close relationship with Ferdinand-Joseph Derons (1700-1762), the son of an organist who was an aquarellist and draughtsman. The two of them possibly had a commercial partnership. Derons was a witness at the late marriage of Martin in 1754 and died in his house in 1762. Martin died in 1763. His collection of prints was auctioned off from his former residence on 2 May 1763.

== Work ==
Martin is known for his imaginary landscape paintings, cityscapes of Brussels and its environs and rural genre scenes. He signed his paintings with 'Andreas Martin' or 'Andreas Marten'.

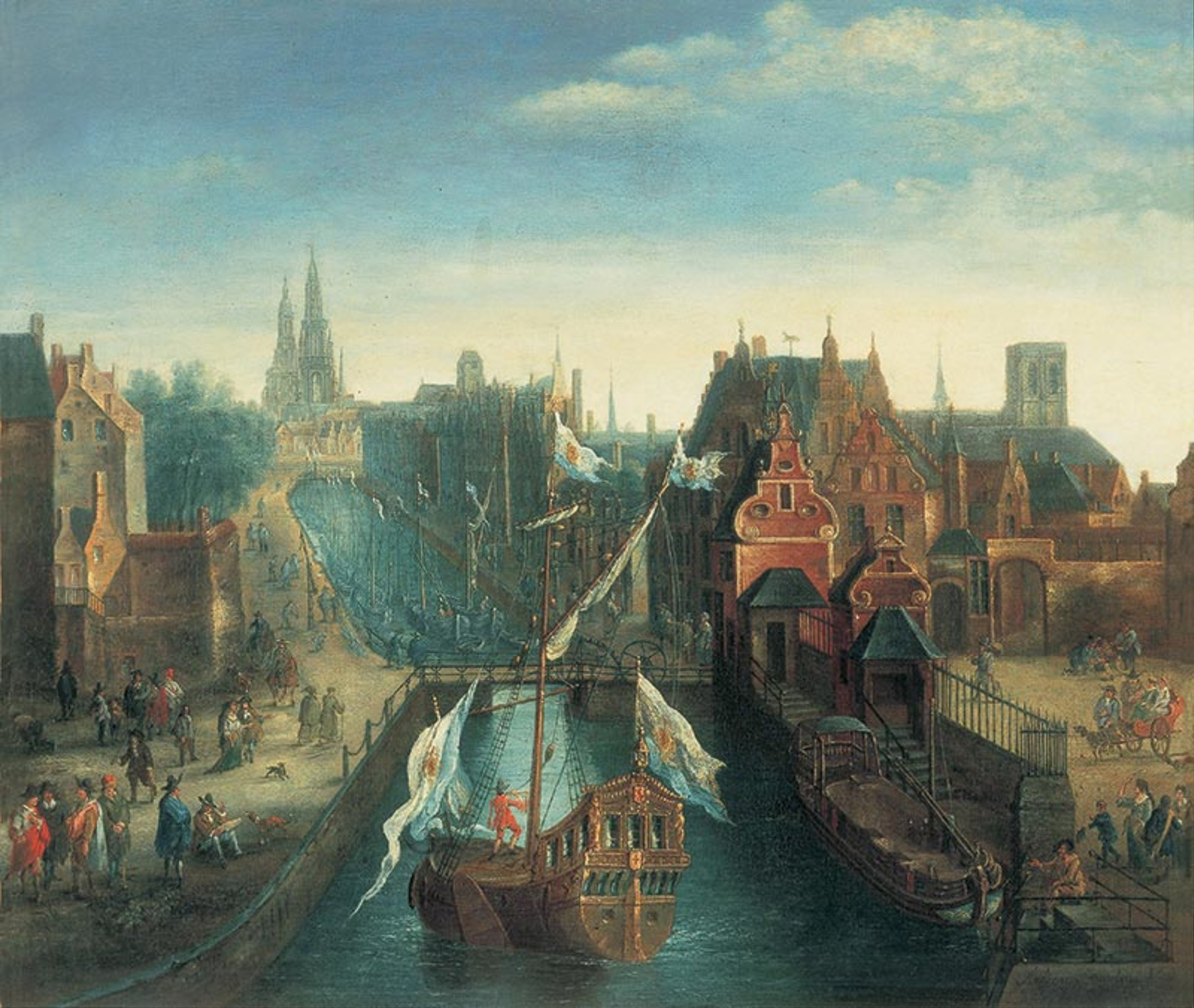
Port of Brussels

His imaginary landscape paintings are in the late Mannerist tradition of Jan Brueghel the Elder. These paintings typically show rural and mountain scenes with travellers on foot, horseback or in carts. In the same tradition he also painted village scenes with markets and festivities. Interesting from a historical perspective are his topographical landscapes and cityscapes, typically depicting scenes in and around Brussels. An example is the View of the Port of Brussels (1750s, Brussels City Museum). It shows in the foreground a large ship with fluttering flags entering the port of Brussels. The tower of the Brussels Town Hall is visible in the background. In the dock in the foreground a moored boat is waiting for passengers travelling to nearby Vilvoorde or Antwerp. Many people are busy on the quays including a person who is sitting on the ground while drawing or writing in a sketchbook. This could be a self-portrait of the artist.

He also documented important historical events in Brussels such as the Entry into Brussels of Archduchess Maria Elisabeth of Austria (c. 1725, Royal Museums of Fine Arts of Belgium). It depicts the Joyous Entry into Brussels of the regent governor of the Austrian Netherlands on 9 October 1725

He also painted genre scenes in the style of David Teniers the Younger, an Antwerp artist who worked for a long time in Brussels.
