= Margaret of Artois =

Countess of Évreux (1285–1311)

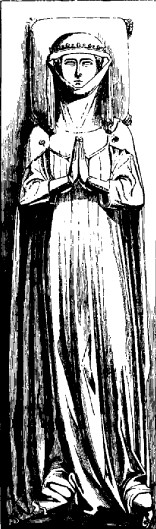
- Born: 1285
- Died: 1311 (aged 25–26)
- Noble family: Artois
- Spouse: Louis d'Évreux
- Issue: Marie, Duchess of Brabant; Charles, Count of Étampes; Philip III, King of Navarre; Margaret, Countess of Auvergne; Joan, Queen of France
- Father: Philip of Artois
- Mother: Blanche of Brittany

Margaret (Marguerite; 1285–1311) was the eldest child of Philip of Artois and Blanche of Brittany. She was a member of the House of Artois. She was married to Louis d'Évreux. By her marriage, Margaret was Countess of Évreux.

== Marriage and issue ==
Margaret was married to Louis d'Évreux at the Hotel d'Evreux, in Paris, son of Philip III of France and his second wife Maria of Brabant. They had:

- Marie d'Évreux (1303 – 31 October 1335); married in 1311 John III, Duke of Brabant.
- Charles d'Évreux (1305–1336), Count of Étampes; married Maria de la Cerda, Lady of Lunel, daughter of Ferdinand de la Cerda.
- Philip III of Navarre (1306–1343); married Joan II of Navarre.
- Margaret d'Évreux (1307–1350); married in 1325 William XII of Auvergne, mother of Jeanne I of Auvergne.
- Jeanne d'Évreux (1310–1370); married Charles IV of France.

Margaret died aged 25 or 26 in Paris and was buried in the now-demolished church of the Couvent des Jacobins with her husband and her five children.

== Sources ==
- Brown, Elizabeth A. R. (2017). "Philip the Fair and His Family: His Sons, Their Marriages, and Their Wives". Medieval Prosopography. 32: 125–185.
- Morrison, Elizabeth; Hedeman, Anne D., eds. (2010). Imagining the Past in France: History in Manuscript Painting, 1250-1500. J. Paul Getty Museum.
