= Louis I of Étampes =

Coat of arms of Louis II d'Évreux

Louis d'Évreux, Count of Étampes (1336 – 6 May 1400) was the son of Charles d'Évreux and Maria de La Cerda y Lara.

According to Froissart he was captured at Poitiers and ransomed. He later served as one of the royal hostages given to Edward III of England to guarantee the Treaty of Brétigny. In the 1390s, Louis was included in the entourage of John, Duke of Berry, who ultimately succeeded him in Étampes.

He married Jeanne (d. 1389), daughter of Raoul I of Brienne, Count of Eu and widow of Walter VI of Brienne, but they had no children.

== Sources ==
- Doubleday, Simon R. (2001). The Lara Family: Crown and Nobility in Medieval Spain. Harvard University Press.

Preceded by Charles	Count of Étampes; 1336–1399	Succeeded by John
Preceded by —	Count of Gien ?–1400	Succeeded by to royal domain
