= Charles d'Évreux =

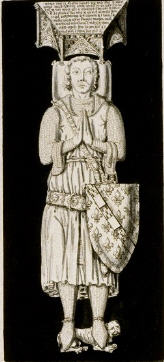
Charles d'Évreux

Coat of arms of Charles d'Évreux

Charles d'Évreux (1305 – 5 September 1336) was the son of Louis, Count of Évreux and Margaret of Artois.

From his father, he inherited the lordship of Étampes, which was made a county in 1327.

He married Maria de La Cerda y de Lara, the daughter of Fernando de la Cerda, in April 1335 at Poissy. They had two children:

1. Louis I, Count of Étampes
2. John (1336 – aft. 1373, Rome)

== Sources ==
- Cazelles, Raymond (1982). Société politique, noblesse et couronne sous Jean le Bon et Charles V (in French). Librairie Droz.
- Keane, Marguerite (2016). Material Culture and Queenship in 14th-century France. Brill.

Preceded by —	Count of Étampes; 1327–1336	Succeeded by Louis
