= Wenceslaus I of Luxembourg =

Wenceslaus I
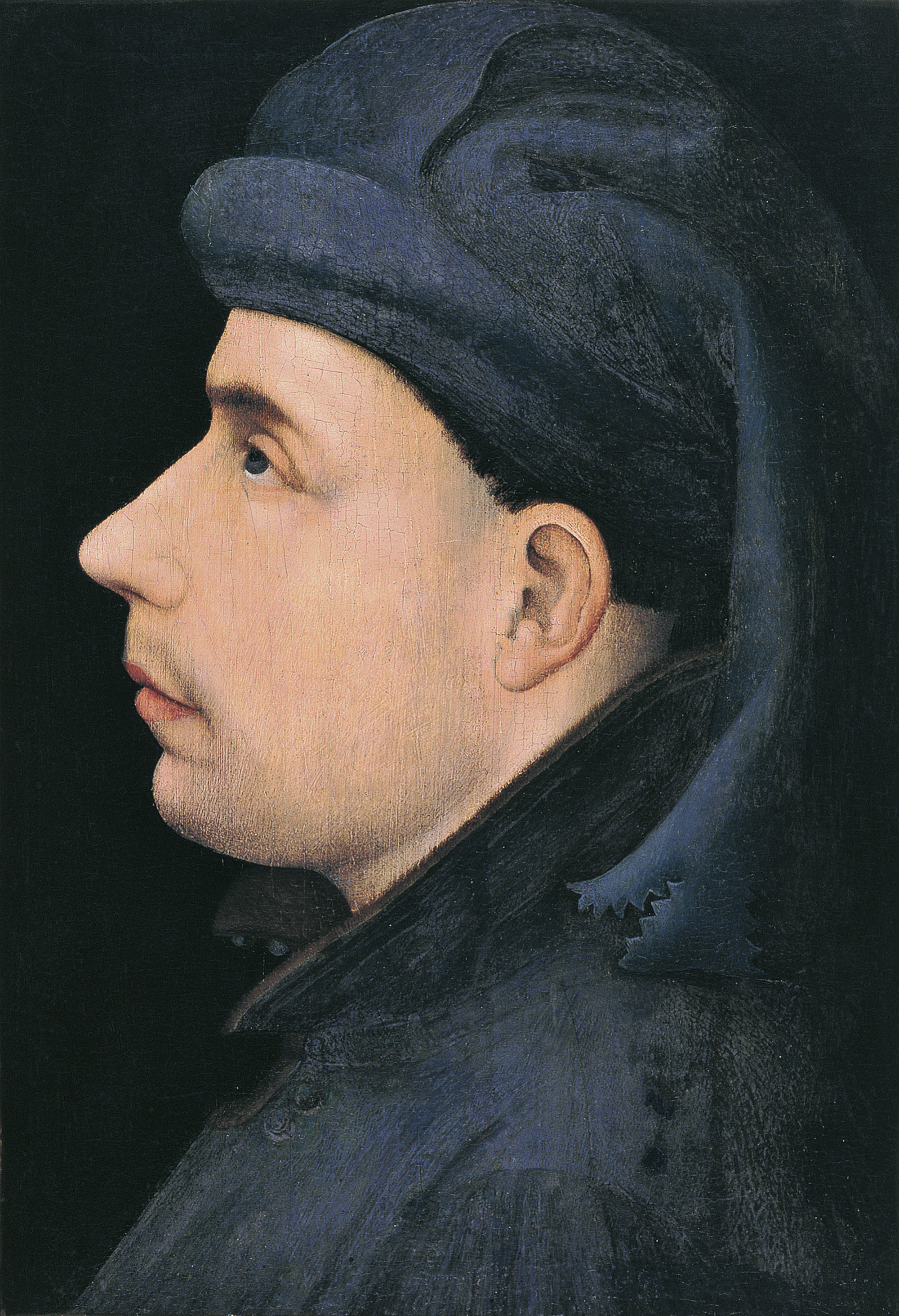

Count of Luxembourg, Arlon and Durbuy
- Reign: 1353-13 March 1354
- Predecessor: Emperor Charles IV

Duke of Luxembourg
- Reign: 13 March 1354-7 December 1383
- Successor: Wenceslaus IV

Duke of Brabant and Limburg with Joanna
- Reign: 1355-1383
- Predecessor: John III
- Successor: Joanna
- Born: 25 February 1337; Prague
- Died: 7 December 1383 (aged 46); Luxembourg
- Burial: Abbaye d'Orval, Belgium
- Spouse: Joanna, Duchess of Brabant
- House: Luxembourg
- Father: John of Bohemia
- Mother: Beatrice of Bourbon

Wenceslaus I (also Wenceslas, Venceslas, Wenzel, or Václav, often called Wenceslaus of Bohemia in chronicles) (25 February 1337 – 7 December 1383) was the first Duke of Luxembourg from 1354. He was the son of John the Blind, King of Bohemia, and Beatrice of Bourbon.

== Life ==
The marriage contract of Wenceslaus' parents stipulated that if a son was born from the marriage, the County of Luxembourg (King John's paternal heritage), as well as lands belonging to it, would go to the child. Beatrice of Bourbon, gave birth to her only child, Duke Wenceslaus I, on 25 February 1337, in Prague.

In 1353 Charles IV King of Bohemia, Count of Luxembourg and elected Holy Roman King, entrusted the county, their father's inheritance, to his half-brother Wenceslaus. In 1352, Wenceslaus married Joanna (1322 – 1406), daughter of John III, Duke of Brabant and Limburg, and Marie d'Évreux. In 1354 Charles raised Luxembourg to the status of a duchy. In 1355, Joanna inherited Brabant and Limburg. In order to guarantee the indivisibility of Brabant, Wenceslaus signed the Joyous Entry, but had to fight against his brother-in-law Louis II of Flanders, who asserted his share of the duchy. He failed to prevent the seizure of Brussels by the Flemings, but a certain Everard 't Serclaes succeeded by an audacious coup in driving them out of the city. Thereafter, Wenceslaus had to face primarily internal disorders. In 1371, he overestimated his military capacities and waged war with William II, Duke of Jülich, resulting in humiliating defeat at the Baesweiler, losing a part of his army, and several noblemen. He was captured and suffered 11 months of captivity.

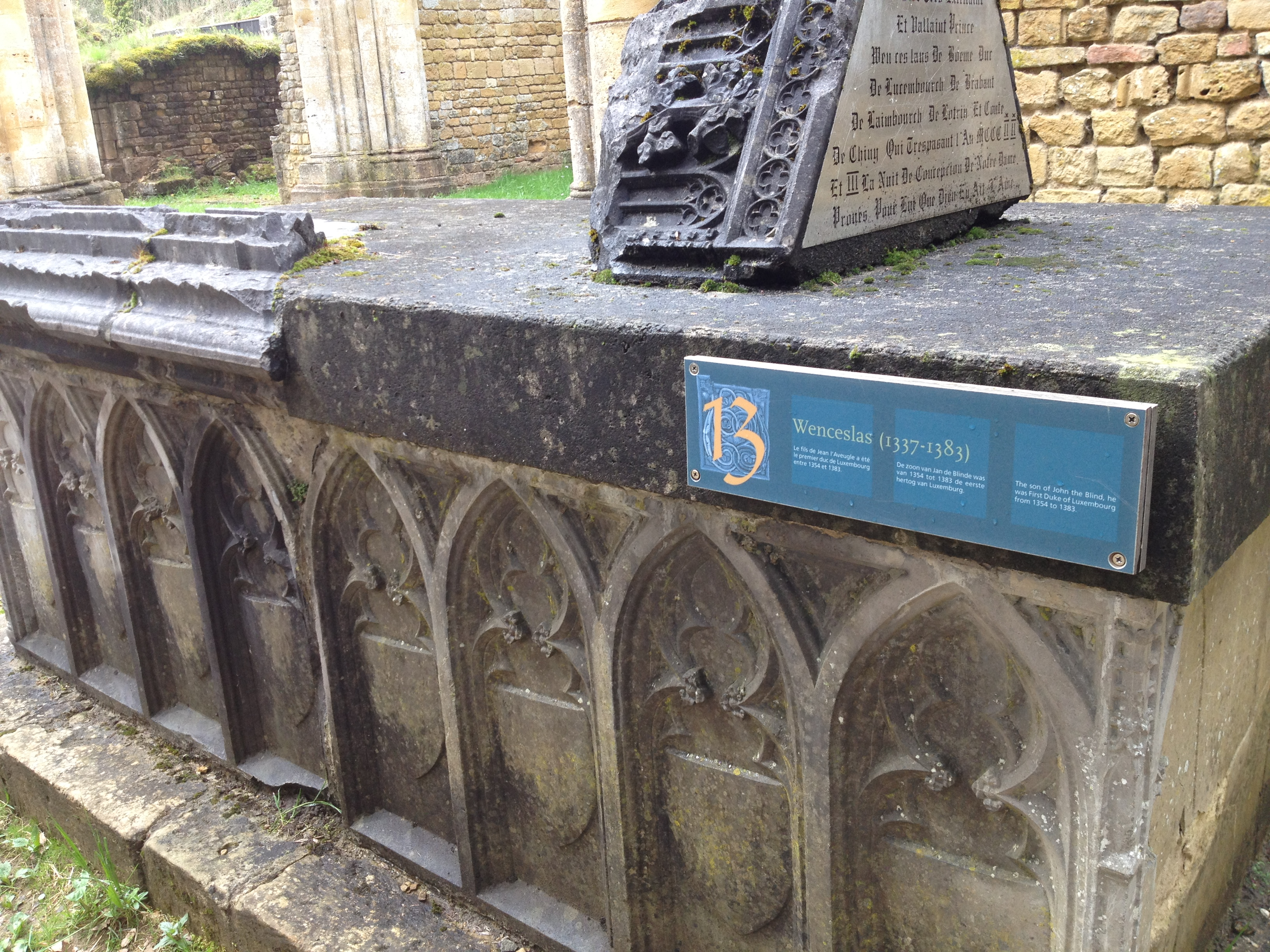
Burial Place in Abbaye d'Orval, Belgium

Wenceslaus died in Luxembourg, leaving Joanna as sole ruler of Brabant, and was succeeded by Wenceslaus II (Wenceslaus IV of Bohemia) as duke of Luxembourg. There are speculations that he might have died of leprosy. His last wish was his heart to be displaced from his dead body and sent to his wife (Joanna stayed in Brussels). He is buried in a crypt at Orval Abbey in Belgium.

Wenceslaus I of Luxembourg wrote the lyric poetry interpolated in Jean Froissart's Méliador, which was identified as his by Auguste Longnon in the 1890s (Wenceslas was a patron of this chronicler). His lyric output comprises 79 poems (11 ballades, 16 virelais, 52 rondeaux).

== Ancestors ==
Ancestors of Wenceslaus I of Luxembourg

16. Henry V, Count of Luxembourg
8. Henry VI, Count of Luxembourg
17. Margaret of Bar
4. Henry VII, Holy Roman Emperor
18. Baldwin of Avesnes
9. Beatrice d'Avesnes
19. Félicité of Coucy
2. John of Bohemia
20. Henry III, Duke of Brabant
10. John I, Duke of Brabant
21. Adelaide of Burgundy
5. Margaret of Brabant
22. Guy of Dampierre
11. Margaret of Flanders
23. Matilda of Bethune
1. Wenceslaus I, Duke of Luxembourg
24. Louis IX of France
12. Robert, Count of Clermont
25. Marguerite of Provence
6. Louis I, Duke of Bourbon
26. John of Burgundy
13. Beatrix of Bourbon
27. Agnes of Dampierre
3. Beatrice of Bourbon
28. John I of Avesnes
14. John II, Count of Holland
29. Adelaide of Holland
7. Mary of Avesnes
30. Henry V, Count of Luxembourg (= 16.)
15. Philippa of Luxembourg
31. Margaret of Bar (= 17.)

== Sources ==
- Boehm, Barbara Drake; Fajt, Jiri, eds. (2005). Prague: The Crown of Bohemia, 1347-1437. Yale University Press.
- Vaughan, Richard (2009). Philip the Bold. The Boydell Press.

Wenceslaus I of Luxembourg House of Luxembourg Born: 25 February 1337 Died: 7 December 1383
Regnal titles
| Preceded by Charles I | Count of Luxembourg; 1353-1354 | Succeeded by Elevated to Duke |
| Preceded by Elevated from Count | Duke of Luxemburg; 1354-1383 | Succeeded by Wenceslaus II |
| Preceded by John III | Duke of Brabant; 1355–1383 with Joanna | Succeeded by Joanna as sole ruler |
