= Joanna of Brabant =

Duchess of Brabant (1322–1406)

Joanna
- Duchess of Brabant, Lothier, and Limburg
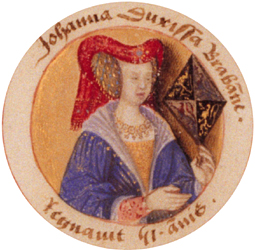
- Born: 24 June 1322
- Died: 1 December 1406 (aged 84)
- Burial: Carmelite monastery, Brussels
- Spouse: William II, Count of Hainaut; Wenceslaus I, Duke of Luxembourg
- House: House of Reginar
- Father: John III, Duke of Brabant
- Mother: Marie d'Évreux

Joanna (24 June 1322 – 1 December 1406) was a ruling duchess of Brabant from 1355 until her death. She was duchess of Brabant until the occupation of the duchy by her brother-in-law Louis II of Flanders. Following her death, the rights to the duchy of Brabant passed to her great-nephew Anthony of Burgundy.

== Life ==
Joanna was born 24 June 1322, the daughter of John III, Duke of Brabant and Marie d'Évreux. Her first marriage, in 1334, was to William II, Count of Hainaut (1307–1345), who subsequently died in battle and their only son William died young, thus foiling the project of unifying their territories.

Joanna's second marriage was to Wenceslaus of Luxemburg. The famous document, the foundation of the rule of law in Brabant called the Blijde Inkomst ("Joyous Entry"), was arrived at in January 1356, in order to assure Joanna and her consort peaceable entry into their capital and to settle the inheritance of the Duchy of Brabant on her "natural heirs", who were Joanna's sisters, they being more acceptable to the burghers of Brabant than rule by the House of Luxembourg. The document was seen as a dead letter, followed by a military incursion in 1356 into Brabant by Louis II of Flanders, who had married Margaret, Joanna's younger sister, and considered himself Duke of Brabant by right of his wife.

With the Duchy overrun by Louis' forces, Joanna and Wencelaus signed the humiliating Treaty of Ath, which ceded Mechelen and Antwerp to Louis. By August 1356 Joanna and Wencelaus had called upon the Emperor, Charles IV to support them by force of arms. Charles met at Maastricht with the parties concerned, including representatives of the towns, and all agreed to nullify certain terms of the Blijde Inkomst, to satisfy the Luxembourg dynasty. The duchy continued to deteriorate with Wencelaus's defeat and capture at the battle of Baesweiler in 1371.

On Joanna's death, by agreement the Duchy passed to her great-nephew Antoine, the second son of her niece Margaret III, Countess of Flanders.

== Tomb ==
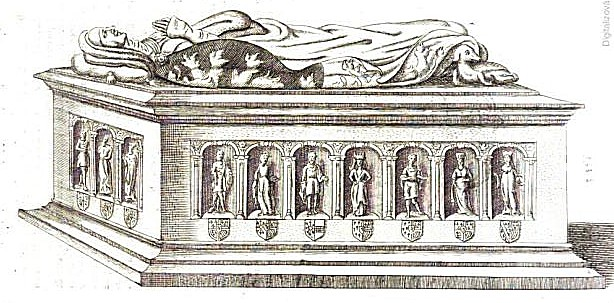
1641 drawing of the tomb

Her tomb was erected in the Carmelite church in Brussels in the late 1450s; it was paid for in 1459 by her sister's great-grandson, Philip the Good. Though it was destroyed in the course of the French Revolutionary Wars, its appearance has been reconstructed from drawings and descriptions by Lorne Campbell, who concluded that the tomb was an afterthought, providing an inexpensive piece of propaganda for Philip's dynastic rights.

== See also ==
- Dukes of Brabant family tree

== Sources ==
- Blockmans, Willem Pieter; Prevenier, Walter (1999). Peters, Edward (ed.). The Promised Lands: The Low Countries Under Burgundian Rule, 1369-1530. Translated by Fackelman, Elizabeth. University of Pennsylvania Press.
- Campbell, Lorne. "The Tomb of Joanna, Duchess of Brabant". Renaissance Studies, volume 2, no. 2, 1988. JSTOR 24409392
- Keane, Marguerite (2016). Material Culture and Queenship in 14th-century France: The Testament of Blanche of Navarre (1331-1398). Brill.
- Vale, Malcolm (2002). The Princely Court: Medieval Courts and Culture in North-West Europe, 1270-1380. Oxford University Press.

Regnal titles
Preceded by John III	Duchess of Brabant; 1355–1406 with Wenceslaus (1355–1383)	Succeeded by Anthony
