= Margaret of Brabant, Countess of Flanders =

Countess consort of Flanders (1323–1380

Margaret of Brabant
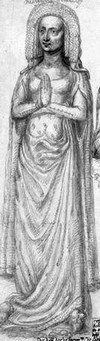
- Born: 9 February 1323
- Died: 1380 (aged 56–57)
- Spouse: Louis II of Flanders
- Issue: Margaret III, Countess of Flanders
- House: Reginar
- Father: John III of Brabant
- Mother: Mary of Évreux

Margaret of Brabant (9 February 1323 – 1380) was Countess of Flanders by marriage. She was the second daughter of Duke John III of Brabant and Mary of Évreux. She was the only child of Duke John to have children. In 1347 she married Louis II of Flanders, who was then sixteen years old and already count of Flanders. On 13 April 1350 their daughter, Margaret III, Countess of Flanders, was baptized. Through this daughter, their only surviving child, Brabant came under the influence of Burgundy when she married Philip the Bold.

On 26 September 1371, Margaret and her mother-in-law, Margaret of France, Countess of Artois, with their attendants, were guests of Philip the Bold, Duke of Burgundy for supper in Lens. Soon afterwards, Margaret left Flanders and went to reside permanently, far from her husband, in the county of Rethel, where she died in April 1380 (after Easter).

Margaret of Brabant, Countess of Flanders House of Reginar Born: 1323 Died: 1380
Royal titles
Vacant Title last held by Margaret I, Countess of Burgundy	Countess consort of Flanders; 1347–1380	Vacant Title next held by Margaret of Bavaria
