= John III of Brabant =

14th century sovereign duke in modern-day Belgium

John III
- Duke of Brabant; Duke of Lothier; Duke of Limburg
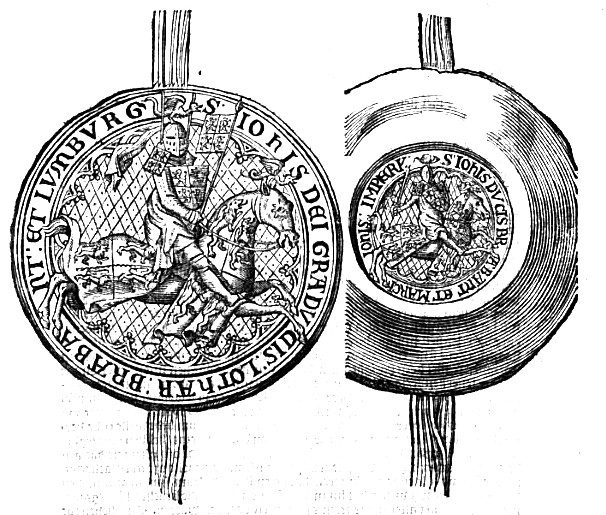
- John's effigy in a seal
- Born: 1300
- Died: 5 December 1355 (aged 54–55); Brussels
- Burial: Villers Abbey
- Spouse: Marie d'Évreux (m. 1311; died 1335)
- Issue: Joanna, Duchess of Brabant; Margaret of Brabant; Marie of Brabant; John; Henry; Godfrey
- House: House of Reginar
- Father: John II, Duke of Brabant
- Mother: Margaret of England

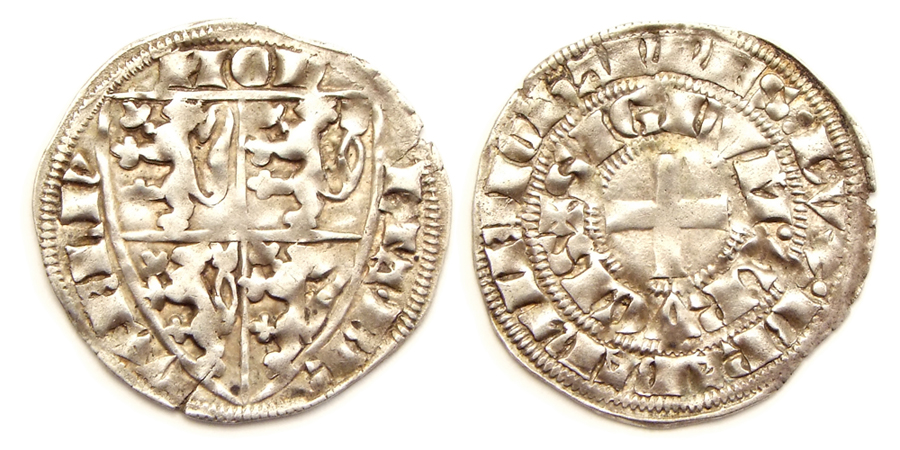
Half groat or demi gros of John III, struck Brussels 1326

John III (Dutch: Jan; 1300 – 5 December 1355) was Duke of Brabant, Lothier (1312–1355) and Limburg (1312–1347 then 1349–1355), the last Brabant male to rule them.

== Biography ==
John was the son of John II, Duke of Brabant, and Margaret of England. In 1312, he succeeded his father as the duke of Brabant, in no small part due to his father's Charter of Kortenberg. In an attempt to improve relations with France, John married Marie of Evreux.

== John and the towns of Brabant ==
The early fourteenth century, a period of economic boom for Brabant, marks the rise of the duchy's towns, which depended on imports of English wool for their essential cloth industry. During John's minority, the major towns of Brabant had the authority to appoint councillors to direct a regency, under terms of the Charter of Kortenberg granted by his father in the year of his death (1312). The marital alignment with France was tested and failed as early as 1316, when Louis X requested John to cease trade with Flanders; the councillors representing the towns found this impossible, and in reprisal Louis prohibited all French trade with Brabant in February 1316. By 1356 his daughter and son-in-law were forced to accept the famous Joyous Entry, as a condition for their recognition, so powerful had the states of Brabant become.

== The French alliance, 1332–1337 ==
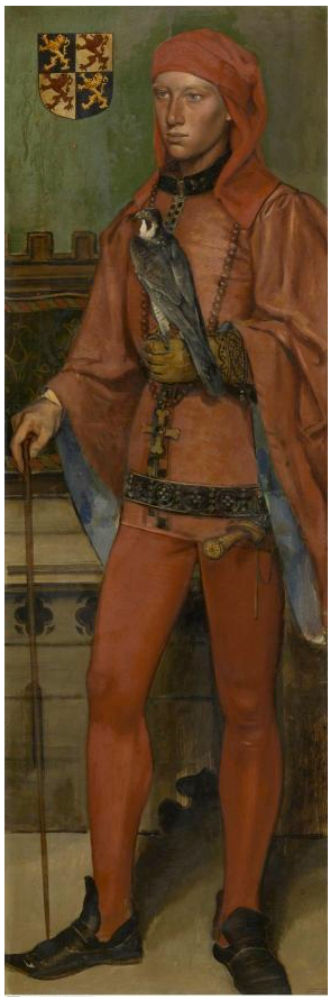
John III, Duke of Brabant, 1326 (1864-1869) by Belgian artist Jan August Hendrik Leys

After his initial period of maintaining independent neutrality from both France and England failed, neighbouring sovereigns in the Low Countries, stimulated as a matter of policy by Philip VI of France, became John's enemies; among the adversaries of John were the Count of Flanders, the prince-bishop of Liège, and counts of Holland and Guelders. In 1332, a crisis with the king of France arose over John's hospitality to Robert, count of Artois, during his journey to eventual asylum at the English court. In response to French pressure John reminded Philip that he did not hold Brabant from him but from God alone. A brief campaign of a coalition of Philip's friends came to a truce, followed by a pact at Compiègne by which John received a fief from Philip worth 2000 livres and declared himself a vassal of France. His oldest son, Jean, was betrothed to Philip's niece, Princess Marie, and it was agreed that the Brabantian heir would complete his education at the French court in Paris and that Robert of Artois would be expelled from Brabant.

The support of France strengthened John's hand with his feudal suzerain, the Holy Roman Emperor. Though he was technically the Emperor's feudal vassal, John had been able to ignore Emperor Louis IV's summons to join him in his intended invasion of Lombardy (1327). The separation of Brabant from the Empire was completed by the Burgundian dukes of Brabant in the fifteenth century.

Meanwhile, the princes of the Low Countries settled their differences and formed a coalition against Brabant with a defensive alliance in June 1333. War was briefly brought to the Duchy of Brabant in the summer of 1334, but resolved by a peace brokered by Philip at Amiens. The French king declared that John had to hand over the town of Tiel and its neighbouring villages Heerewaarden and Zandwijk to the count of Guelders and to betroth his daughter Marie to the count's son, Reinoud.

== The English alliance, 1337–1345 ==
When Edward III of England decided to press his claim to the crown of France in 1337, John, who was his first cousin, became an ally of England during the first stage of the Hundred Years' War. King Edward's diplomatic offensive to draw Brabant away from France, produced a sympathetic response from Duke John. Disrupting the staple connection between the towns of Flanders and the sources of English wool should divert it to the towns of Brabant, notably the recently established wool exchange. Edward protected Brabançon merchants in England from arrest or the confiscation of their goods, and he sweetened his offers with a promise of £60,000, an immense sum, and to make good any losses of revenue that might result from penalties by the king of France. The same month of July 1337 John promised Edward 1,200 of his men-at-arms in the event of an English campaign in France, Edward to pay their salary. In August Edward pledged not to negotiate with the king without prior consultation with the duke. The alliance, kept secret at John's insistence, came into the open when Edward landed with his troops at Antwerp July 1338. John received the promised subsidy (March 1339) and agreed in June to betroth John's second daughter, Margaret, to Edward, the Black Prince, heir to the English throne. Two seasons of inconclusive campaigning that ravaged the north of France left Edward penniless at the end of 1341; he returned home, and when he returned to the fray, it was to Brittany: he never returned to the Low Countries.

== The French alliance, 1345–1355 ==
Though John was requesting papal dispensation for the marriage of Margaret and the Black Prince in 1343, the alliance with England unravelled as Edward's coffers emptied and his attentions turned elsewhere. In September 1345 representative of France and Brabant met at the Château de Saint-Germain-en-Laye to sign preliminary agreements, and by a treaty signed at Saint-Quentin, June 1347, Brabant was retained as an ally by France. Margaret was now to marry Louis of Male, who had inherited the title of count of Flanders, but whose power over the Flemish communes was virtually nil. A point of dispute with the count of Flanders had been the Lordship of Mechelen, a strategic enclave within Brabant: it was agreed that it would now come under full Brabantian control. Despite the diplomacy of Edward, John remained true to his French commitments until his death in December 1355.

== Family ==
In 1311, as his father's gesture of rapprochement with France, John married Marie of Évreux (1303–1335), the daughter of Prince Louis, Count of Évreux and Margaret of Artois. They had:

- Joanna, Duchess of Brabant (24 June 1322 – 1406), married first to William IV, Count of Holland and second to Wenceslaus I, Duke of Luxembourg.
- Margaret of Brabant (9 February 1323 – 1368), married at Saint-Quentin on 6 June 1347 Louis II, Count of Flanders, she is the ancestor of later dukes
- Marie of Brabant (1325 – 1 March 1399), Lady of Turnhout, married at Tervuren on 1 July 1347 to Reginald III of Guelders
- John of Brabant (1327–1335/36), married Marie of France (1326–1333), daughter of King Philip VI of France, (Note: Henneman refers to Marie's husband as "duke of brabant's heir".) but died soon after with no issue, buried in Tervueren.
- Henri of Brabant (d. 29 October 1349), Duke of Limburg and Lord of Mechelen in 1347. Died young and buried in Tervuren in 1349.
- Godfrey of Brabant (d. aft. 3 February 1352), Lord of Aarschot in 1346. Also died young and buried in Tervuren.

John also had a son born from Elisabeth Maria of Huldenberg (d. 1365), who founded the House of Brant: John I Brant, 1st Lord of Ayseau.

In 1355, after all of his three legitimate sons had died, John was forced to declare his eldest daughter Joanna his heiress, which provoked a succession crisis after his death. John III was buried in the Cistercian Abbey of Villers, Belgium.

== Sources ==
- Adde, Eloise (2024). "Nation-Power-Subjectivity: The Making of National Subjects in Bohemia and Brabant at the Beginning of the Fourteenth Century". In Kooper, Erik; Levelt, Sjoerd (eds.). The Medieval Chronicle 16. Brill. pp. 1–21.
- Blockmans, Willem Pieter; Prevenier, Walter (1999). The Promised Lands: The Low Countries under Burgundian rule, 1369–1530. University Pennsylvania Press.
- Boffa, Sergio (2005). "The Duchy of Brabant caught between France and England: geopolitics and diplomacy during the first half of the Hundred Years' War". In Villalon, L. J. Andrew; Kagay, Donald J. (eds.). The Hundred Years War: A Wider Focus. Vol. I.
- Boffa, Sergio (2004). Warfare in Medieval Brabant, 1356-1406. Boydell Press.
- Henneman, John Bell (1971). Royal Taxation in Fourteenth-Century France: The Development of War Financing, 1322-1359. Princeton University Press.91
- Ormrod, W. M. (2011). Edward III. Yale University Press.
- Stein, Robert (2017). Magnanimous Dukes and Rising States: The Unification of the Burgundian Netherlands, 1380-1480. Oxford University Press.
- Warnicke, Retha M. (2000). The Marrying of Anne of Cleves: Royal Protocol in Early Modern England. Cambridge University Press.

Regnal titles
Preceded by John II	Duke of Brabant, Lothier and Limburg; 1312–1355	Succeeded by Joan
