= Otto of Louvain =

11th-century Count of Louvain from the House of Reginar

- Count of Louvain
- Engraved portrait of Otto of Louvain by Coenraet Waumans
- Reign: 1038–1040
- Predecessor: Henry I
- Successor: Lambert II
- Born: Second or third decade of the 11th century
- Died: c. 1040
- Noble family: House of Reginar
- Father: Henry I
- Mother: Unknown

Otto of Louvain (French: Otton de Louvain) was a Flemish nobleman who served as Count of Louvain from 1038 until his death around 1040.

== Origins ==
According to the Chronicon Sigeberti, preserved in the Recueil des historiens des Gaules et de la France. Tome 11, Otto was the son of Henry I, Count of Louvain.

Henry I, according to the Gesta Episcoporum Cameracensium, liber III, was the son of Lambert I.

Lambert I married Gerberga of Lorraine, who, according to the Genealogica comitum Buloniensium, was the daughter of Charles, Duke of Lower Lorraine. Charles was married to Adelaide of Troyes, daughter of Robert of Vermandois.

== Biography ==
Very little information is available about Otto. The only source that mentions him is the Chronicon Sigeberti, preserved in the Recueil des historiens des Gaules et de la France. Tome 11, where he is identified as the son and successor of Henry I.

Henry I died in 1038, as confirmed by the same chronicle, having been killed by a man named Herman, who had been his prisoner. Otto succeeded him as count.

The Chronicon Sigeberti further reports that Otto died suddenly and prematurely, and that he was succeeded by his paternal uncle Lambert II, called Balderic. The Vita Gudilae (written between 1048 and 1051) states that Lambert II succeeded directly after his brother Henry I. His countship is disputed by some sources which identify Lambert II as count at this time; although Lambert II was Otto's uncle, it is believed Otto reigned as count for some 2 years before his uncle was formally count.

== See also ==
- Kings of France
- Kings of Germany
- Counts of Hainaut
- Dukes of Brabant

== Bibliography ==
=== Primary sources ===
- Recueil des historiens des Gaules et de la France. Tome 11 [Collection of the Historians of Gaul and France, Volume 11] (in Latin). Paris: Imprimerie nationale.
- Monumenta Germaniae Historica, Scriptores, tomus VII [Monumenta Germaniae Historica, Writers, Volume VII] (in Latin).
- Monumenta Germaniae Historica, Scriptores, tomus IX [Monumenta Germaniae Historica, Writers, Volume IX] (in Latin).

=== Other sources ===
- "BRABANT, LOUVAIN – OTHON" [Brabant, Louvain – Otto]. Foundation for Medieval Genealogy.
- "Dukes of Brabant and Landgraves of Hesse – Otto" [Dukes of Brabant and Landgraves of Hesse – Otto]. Genealogy.eu.
