= Henry I of Louvain =

Count of Louvain
- Reign: 1015 – 1038
- Predecessor: Lambert I
- Successor: Otto (disputed); Lambert II
- Died: August 1038; Leuven
- Issue: Otto (disputed)
- House: House of Reginars
- Father: Lambert I
- Mother: Gerberga

Henry I was the Count of Louvain from 1015 until 1038. He was a member of the House of Reginar.

Henry was a child of Count Lambert I of Louvain and his wife, Gerberga, daughter of Duke Charles of Lower Lorraine. Henry succeeded his father on his father's death in 1015.

He was assassinated in 1038 by a knight named Hermann who was his prisoner. Without a male heir, he was succeeded by his brother, Lambert II.

== Marriage and children ==
Henry's wife, whose name is not recorded in history, gave birth to Otto, who succeeded Henry in 1038. His existence is disputed.

A 19th century genealogy, Genealogica ex Stirpe Sancti Arnulfi descendentium Mettensis also attributes three daughters to Henri (Adelaide, Cunegonde and Adele), but it seems that they were daughters of another Henry, descendant of the counts of Louvain, who lived around 1100.

== Sources ==
- Tanner, Heather J. (1992). "The Expansion of the Power and Influence of the Counts of Boulogne under Eustace II". In Chibnall, Marjorie (ed.). Proceedings of the Battle Conference 1991. The Boydell Press.
