= Baldwin II of Boulogne =

Count of Boulogne from 990 to 1027

Baldwin II
- Died: c. 1027
- Noble family: House of Flanders
- Spouse: Adelina of Holland
- Issue: Eustace I of Boulogne
- Father: Arnulf III of Boulogne

Baldwin II († c. 1027) was the count of Boulogne from 990 until his death.

== Life ==
Baldwin II was the son of Count Arnulf III of Boulogne and succeeded his father as count circa 990. (Note: Tanner lists Baldwin's father as Arnulf II.) Both Arnulf III and his father Arnulf II had freed themselves of Flemish rule during the minority of Count Baldwin IV of Flanders. In 1022 both Baldwin and his son Eustace, along with the counts of Normandy, Valois, and Flanders, met with King Robert II of France and formed an alliance against Count Odo II of Blois who was challenging the king's authority. But when Emperor Henry II died in July 1024 the alliance quickly fell apart as King Robert reconciled with count Odo II. In the wake of these changing alliances and for reasons that remain unclear, Baldwin was killed in battle c. 1027 warring with Count Enguerrand I of Ponthieu, who then wed Baldwin's widow.

== Family and issue ==
Baldwin married Adelina of Holland, possibly the daughter of Count Arnulf of Holland and Lutgardis of Luxemburg. (Note: "Andre Duchesne states that Adelvie was the daughter of Arnulf count of Gent (d. c. 1018) and his wife Lietgarde; (Duchesne 1631): 38. He offers no proof and I have found no direct evidence.") They had:

- Eustace I of Boulogne, who succeeded him.

After Baldwin's death Adelina married Count Enguerrand I of Ponthieu.

== Sources ==
- Tanner, Heather J. (1992). "The Expansion of the Power and Influence of the Counts of Boulogne under Eustace II". In Chibnall, Marjorie (ed.). Anglo-Norman Studies XIV: Proceedings of the Battle Conference 1991. The Boydell Press. ISBN 978-0851153162.
- Tanner, Heather J. (2004). Families, Friends, and Allies: Boulogne and Politics in Northern France and England, c.879-1160. Brill. ISBN 978-9004132436.

Baldwin II of Boulogne House of Boulogne Born: unknown Died: c. 1027
Preceded by Arnulf III	Count of Boulogne; 990–1027	Succeeded by Eustace I
