= Eustace I =

Eustace I may refer to:

- Eustace I, Count of Boulogne (r. 1033–1047)
- Eustace I, Count of Guînes (r. 1036–1052/65)
- Eustace I of Caesarea, lord (r. 1110–1123)
- Eustace I of Conflans (fl. 1165–1207), lord
- Eustache I du Bellay (died 1504), French nobleman and priest
