= Arnulf III =

Arnulf III may refer to:

- Arnulf III, Count of Boulogne (died 990)
- Arnulf III, Count of Flanders (c. 1055–1071)
- Arnulf III (Archbishop of Milan) (died 1097)
