= Eustace of Boulogne =

Eustace of Boulogne may refer to one of these four Counts of Boulogne:

- Eustace I of Boulogne r. 1045–1049, son of Count Baldwin II of Boulogne and Adelina of Holland
- Eustace II of Boulogne (c. 1015–1020 – c. 1087), count of Boulogne from 1049 to 1087 and companion of William the Conqueror
- Eustace III of Boulogne, count of Boulogne, son of Eustace II of Boulogne and Ida of Lorraine
- Eustace IV of Boulogne (c. 1130 – 1153), Count of Boulogne and son and heir of Stephen of England
