= Lambert I of Louvain =

Belgian noble

Lambert I
- Count of Louvain
- Died: 12 September 1015; Florennes
- Noble family: House of Reginar
- Spouse: Gerberga of Lower Lorraine
- Issue: Henry I of Louvain; Lambert II of Louvain
- Father: Reginar III of Hainaut

Lambert the Bearded (c. 950 – 12 September 1015) was the first person to be described as a count of Leuven (French Louvain) in a surviving contemporary record, being described this way relatively late in life, in 1003. He is also the patrilineal ancestor of all the future counts of Leuven and dukes of Brabant until his descendant John III, Duke of Brabant, who died in 1355.

He fought throughout his life towards the eventual successful establishment of his family in a long-lasting position of power, but Lambert was known throughout much of his life as a rebellious noble, from a rebel family. Lambert was eventually killed in battle at Florennes, fighting against his old enemy Godfrey "the childless", the Duke of Lower Lotharingia who represented royal authority in the region. One monastic writer, Dietmar of Merseburg, described him as the worst person in his whole country ― a country which mourned during his life, and rejoiced at his death.

Historical discussion about the life of Lambert is closely connected to that of his brother and ally Reginar IV. The two brothers entered Lotharingia aggressively from France after the death of their father in exile. They battled for status over decades, and some historians believe that their families only consolidated lasting acceptance after their deaths. Reginar IV, apparently the elder brother, claimed a county based in Mons in Hainaut as something which their father Reginar III had held. The basis of Lambert's claim on Leuven is less clear. It may for example have been granted to him by his father-in-law, the French Carolingian Duke Charles. It is also unclear whether Lambert already laid claim to the Brabant lordship of Brussels within his lifetime. Van Droogenbroeck, for example, has proposed that this territory to the west of Leuven only came to Lambert's family in later generations.

== Parentage ==
Lambert was a member of the 10th-century Lotharingian noble family known to modern historians as the Reginars, because of their frequent use of the personal name Reginar. (Medieval chronicles also give several of those Reginars the byname "Longneck".) His great uncle, Gilbert had ruled the formerly independent kingdom of Lotharingia as Duke. He switched allegiance between France and the Holy Roman Empire, and back again, and was killed for this rebellion against his wife's family, the German Ottonians in 939.

Lambert was the son of Gilbert's nephew Reginar III who helped lead a French attempt to take over Lotharingia in 944, and was exiled from the Holy Roman Empire in about 958 after being defeated in another Lotharingian rebellion. By this time the Duke of Lotharingia, Bruno, Archbishop of Cologne, was a loyal member of the Ottonian royal family.

Reginar III died in exile in Bohemia in 973, and soon after his sons Lambert and Reginar IV launched their first failed invasion of Lotharingia, attempting to take control of lands in the county of Hainaut which had belonged to their father.

== Life ==
In his chronicle entry for 973, Sigebert of Gembloux mentioned that Reginar and Lambert, sons of Reginar (III) Longneck, fought and killed Count Werner and his brother Rainold, who were occupying the county once held by Reginar III. They attacked at Péronnes-lez-Binche and took a fort called "Buxude" above the Haine, the river which Hainaut is named after. This was either Boussu west of Mons, or Boussoit to the east at La Louvière. Among the sources which confirm this killing, the chronicle known as the deeds (Gesta) of the bishops of Cambrai adds that the new young German emperor Otto II, when he heard of this, gathered a force to besiege them, and then destroyed the castle, took them captive, and banished them from the country. The Gesta claims that Werner and Rainold had been assigned by Duke Bruno to govern Hainaut after the death of Count Richar, who had died the year before. It also notes that after this defeat Lambert and his brother engaged in plundering and disturbances of the peace, and then withdrew to Carolingian-ruled northern France where they improved their military practices and gained the support of Charles, Duke of Lower Lorraine, a rebellious younger brother of the French King Lothair of France, who was one of the last ruling members of the Carolingian dynasty, and Eudes, the son of his ally and kinsman Adalbert I, Count of Vermandois.

In his entry for 976 Sigebert mentioned that "the sons of Reginar Longneck" invaded Mons, this time with Charles. They fought against the counts Godfrey "the captive" and Arnulf of Valenciennes, who had been assigned the "county of Mons" after the deaths of Werner and Rainold. Godfrey and his family, which is today known as the House of Ardenne, were Lotharingian adherents of the Ottonian kings of Germany, and opponents of the Lotharingian claims of the French Carolingians. They held various bishoprics and counties throughout the 10th century. During the 10th and 11th century several of the dukes of upper and lower Lotharingia belonged to this family.

In Sigebert's entry for the year 977, which mentions that Charles was made Duke of Lower Lorraine at this time, Lambert and his brother Reginar IV are also mentioned. The entry notes that Lambert married Gerberga, the daughter of Charles, and his brother Reginar IV married the daughter of another French king, Hugh Capet, ancestor of the Capetian dynasty. According to the historian Ferdinand Lot, however, in 977 it was Charles who was married, and his daughter must have married later. Sigebert also mentioned that Lambert and his brother Reginar IV were relocated in the lands of their father (in terra patrum suorum relocavit). It is believed that they did not yet have full control of the counties they would eventually hold, but for example historian Jean-Louis Kupper believes that they received part.

In 978, the brothers fought on the side of France against Otto II of Germany. Although they were described as counts, this was likely a reflection of personal status, and does not prove that they held specific territorial counties.

In 985, several records indicate an alliance between the brothers and France. Duke Charles and Reginar IV attended an assembly with King Lothar in France, and after the capture of Godfrey I of Verdun (known as "the captive") one of the conditions for his freedom was the restitution of Mons to Reginar IV. This indicates that Reginar IV still did not have control of Mons.

Before 995, Lambert was engaged in on-going conflict in or near the region of the Pagus of Brabant (between the Scheldt and Dyle rivers), and one of his enemies was Count Ansfried. This was reported in the early 11th century by Alpertus of Metz, who described Count Lambert as having been a desperado, a leader of bandits (praedones) who he preferred not to even name, and who profited from the blood and booty of the citizens, and then hid in forests and swamps. In contrast, Alpertus praised Count Ansfried, who became bishop of Utrecht in 995, saying he had often defeated the bandits in Brabant, but without disadvantaging the citizens in the way Lambert did.

It was only in 998, at least according to Alberic of Trois-Fontaines, that Reginar IV gained control of Mons. It is probable then, that Reginar IV did not receive Mons until after the death of his rival Godfrey "the captive", who is last recorded alive in 997. Lambert, on the other hand, was not described as a count of Leuven until 1003.

In 1006, Lambert was an ally of the powerful Counts of Flanders in their successful efforts to gain a foothold in the empire, east of the Schelde. For this reason, the emperor Henry II held Lambert's son hostage. The entry of Flanders into Lotharingia was a major turning point, balancing the power of the House of Ardenne, and giving Lambert and his family a new long-run ally.

Some time after 1010, Alpertus described Lambert as an ally (cliens) of Count Balderic, whose powerbase was around the area east of Nijmegen near the modern border of Germany and the Netherlands. Lambert and Count Gerhard of Metz, described as Balderic's closest friend, were called upon to besiege a new fortification made on the banks of the Maas river, by his "Saxon" rival from north of the Rhine, Wichmann of Vreden. As the situation escalated Alpertus wrote that Gerhard and Lambert "said that they would endure travails and dangers" because "these two men were always prepared to stir up any kind of commotion or rebellion". Alpertus had more respect for other supporters of this clique during this dispute: the Bishop of Cologne; Adalbold who had replaced Ansfried as bishop of Utrecht in 1010; and the emperor himself also gave them considerable grace.

According to the chronicle of the deeds (Gesta) of the bishops of Cambrai, Balderic II, who became bishop of Liège in 1008, was a kinsman of Lambert, and thought it would be good to establish friendship with him. However, the bishop of Cambrai from 1012, Gerard of Florennes, advised that he was unreliable, and was proven right by the subsequent battle of Hoegaarden. The text also claims that Gerard was influential in the appointment at this time of his own kinsman, Godfrey II "the childless" son of Godfrey the captive and enemy of Lambert, as the new Duke of Lower Lotharingia, after the 1012 death of Duke Otto, the son of Lambert's old ally Duke Charles.

In 1013 then, Lambert, with his nephew Reginar V, and Robert II, Count of Namur, defeated Bishop Balderic at Hoegaarden, after the bishop tried to fortify the town against the encroachments of Lambert into his territory. They captured the brother of Godfrey II, Count Herman, the margrave of Ename, but he was given into the captivity of Count Robert, and soon released. Modern historians see this battle as one step in a long-term push by Lambert and his descendants to take control of the region to the east of Leuven, the county of Brugeron, a part of the fertile Hesbaye, which was in the possession of the prince-bishopric of Liège.

== Death ==
12 September 1015, at Florennes, Lambert was killed in battle. Lambert was once again supported by his nephew Reginar V. They were attacking Godfrey II and his brother Count Herman. Dietmar's report of his death described Lambert as the much hated son of Reginar, who was the worst person in his whole country, and had strangled many people in churches with bell ropes.

== Legacy ==
After the death of Lambert, the Gesta of the bishops of Cambrai explains that bishop Gerard initially opposed the idea that, in the interests of peace, Reginar IV's son Count Reginar V should marry the daughter of count Herman, uniting the two opposed families. He argued that the couple were too closely related according to the strict papal rules of the time. (They were said to be connected in the 4th and 5th degree, although their relationship is no longer known.) However, he accepted it on advice from other bishops. The historian Michel de Waha has argued that the family only gained full legitimacy in their father's county of Hainaut after this marriage.

Many of Lambert's generation of friends and enemies died soon after, leading to a fundamental rebalancing of power that eventually favoured his family, and reduced the power of the dynasty of the Godfreys, the Verdun branch of the House of Ardenne. As recounted by Dietmar, Wichmann of Vreden was killed in 1016, thus putting Balderic, who was suspected to be involved, at odds with Emperor Henry II. Godefrey II also later defeated Gerhard in a separate battle which began as a judicial duel in 1017, capturing both Count Balderic, and Gerhard's son Siegfried. In 1018, Godfrey and Gerhard were forced to make peace by the emperor, and Balderic was also reconciled with the emperor, but Godfrey II was then crushingly defeated and captured later that year when leading imperial forces against another rebel, Dirk III, Count of Holland, whose mother, like Gerhard's wife, was a sister of the emperor's wife Cunegunde.

Despite the criticisms of the chronicles, there were many factors influencing their depiction of Lambert, including imperial politics. The chronicle of the bishops of Cambrai, in its entry for 1017, openly complains that the sisters-in-law of Emperor Henry II had been arousing rebellions against the status quo, which it associated with their bishop Gerard and his cousin Godfrey II. Apart from the balance of power in Lotharingia, another matter of dispute which influenced these alliances was the imperial succession. Henry II's successor was Conrad II, the son of Count Gerhard's sister, who Dietmar says was injured by Godfrey II's forces in 1017.

== Wife and children ==
Lambert was the husband of Gerberga of Lower Lorraine, and father of:

- Henry I, Count of Louvain,
- Lambert II, Count of Louvain, also known as Balderic, was his brother's heir, and married Oda, a granddaughter of his father's old-enemy Godfrey the captive. They are ancestors of further counts of Leuven (Louvain) and Dukes of Brabant.
- Reinier (Reginar) Van Droogenbroeck has proposed his existence based on records of his grandson Baldwin of Brussels, and proposes that another grandchild is Richilde, Countess of Hainaut.
- Matilda (Maud) of Louvain, countess of Boulogne as wife of Eustace I of Boulogne

== Family ==
The dynastic connections of Lambert of Leuven

Charles the Simple; King of West Francia	Henry the Fowler; King of East Francia	Reginar I Longneck
Louis d'Outremer; King of West Francia	Gerberga	Gilbert, Duke of Lotharingia	Reginar II
King Lothair of France	Charles, Duke of Lower Lotharingia	Henry	Reginar III
Otto, Duke of Lower Lotharingia	Ermengarde, m. Albert I, Count of Namur	Gerberga	Lambert the bearded, Count of Leuven	Reginar IV
Robert II, Count of Namur	Albert II, Count of Namur	Henry I, Count of Louvain	Lambert alias Balderic, Count of Leuven	Reginar V
Married Regelinde, grand-daughter of Godfrey the captive.	Married Oda, grand-daughter of Godfrey the captive.	Married Mathilde, grand-daughter of Godfrey the captive.
Counts of Namur	Counts of Louvain	Herman, Count of Hainaut

== Sources ==
- Van Droogenbroeck, Frans J. (1999), "Paltsgraaf Herman II (†1085) en de stichting van de abdij van Affligem (28 juni 1062)", Jaarboek voor Middeleeuwse Geschiedenis, ISBN 9065500804
- Kupper, Jean-Louis (2015), Notger de Liège, Académie royale de Belgique, p. 27, ISBN 9782803105038
- Lot, Ferdinand (1891), Les derniers Carolingiens, Paris, E. Bouillon, p. 287
- Tanner, Heather J. (1992), "The Expansion of the Power and Influence of the Counts of Boulogne under Eustace II", in Chibnall, Marjorie (ed.), Anglo-Norman Studies - XIV. Proceeding of the Battle Conference 1991, 14, The Boydell Press, pp. 251–286
- de Waha, Michel (2000), "Filii Ragineri in terra patrum suorum relocati sunt. Pouvoir, opposition et intégration dans le Hainaut du Xème siècle", in Billen, Claire (ed.), Hainaut et Tournaisis, regards sur dix siècles d'histoire. Recueil d'études dédiées à la mémoire de Jacques Nazet (1944-1996), pp. 61–85
- de Waha, Michel (1998), "Du pagus de Brabant au comté de Hainaut: Eléments pour servir à l'histoire de la construction de la principauté", Colloque de Soignies, La Charte-loi de Soignies et son environnement, 1142, Annales du Cercle Royal d’Histoire et d’Archéologie du Canton de Soignies, XXXVI, pp. 25–111

Medieval works

- Alpertus of Metz, De diversitate temporum:

- Latin MGH edition: Alpertus of Metz (1841), Pertz (ed.), De diversitate temporum, MGH Scriptores, vol. 4
- Dutch translation: Alpertus of Metz (1999), Gebeurtenissen van deze tijd, translated by van Rij, Hilversum
- English translation: Alpertus of Metz (2012), Warfare and Politics in Medieval Germany, ca. 1000. On the Variety of Our Times, translated by Bachrach, David S.

- Dietmar (Thietmar) of Merseburg, Chronicon:

- Older Latin MGH edition: Thietmar of Merseburg, Lappenberg (ed.), Chronicon, MGH Scriptores, vol. 3, p. 851
- Newer Latin MGH edition: Holtsmann, ed. (1935), Chronicon, MGH SS rer. Germ. N. S., vol. 9
- English translation: Ottonian Germany. The Chronicon of Thietmar of Merseburg, translated by Warner, David A., Manchester, 2001
- German translation: R. Holtzmann,Die Chronik des Bischofs Thietmar von Merseburg und ihre Korveier Überarbeitung reproduced by Trillmich in 1957.

- Flodoard of Reims, Annals:

- The annals of Flodoard of Reims, 919-966, Readings in medieval civilizations and cultures, vol. 9, translated by Fanning, S; Bachrach, David. S., 2004
- Latin MGH edition: Flodoard of Reims (1881), Heller, J.; Waitz, G. (eds.), Annales, MGH Scriptores, vol. 3

- Gesta episcoporum Cameracensium:

- Latin MGH edition: Bethmann, Ludwig Conrad, ed. (1846), Gesta episcoporum Cameracensium, MGH Scriptores, vol. 7
- English translation: Bachrach, David S; Bachrach, Bernard S; Leese, Michael, Deeds of the Bishops of Cambrai, Translation and Commentary

- Sigebert of Gembloux (1844), Bethmann, Ludwig Conrad (ed.), Chronica Sigeberti Gemblacensis monachi, MGH Scriptores, vol. 6, pp. 268–474

Regnal titles
New title	Count of Louvain; 1003–1015	Succeeded by Henry I
