= Arnulf II =

Arnulf II may refer to:

- Arnulf II, Count Palatine of Bavaria (died 954), son of Duke Arnulf I of Bavaria
- Arnulf II of Boulogne (died 971)
- Arnulf II of Flanders (960/1–987)
- Arnulf II (archbishop of Milan) (died 1018)
