= Egmond Abbey =

Benedictine monastery in Netherlands

Coordinates: 52°35′42″N 4°39′37″E

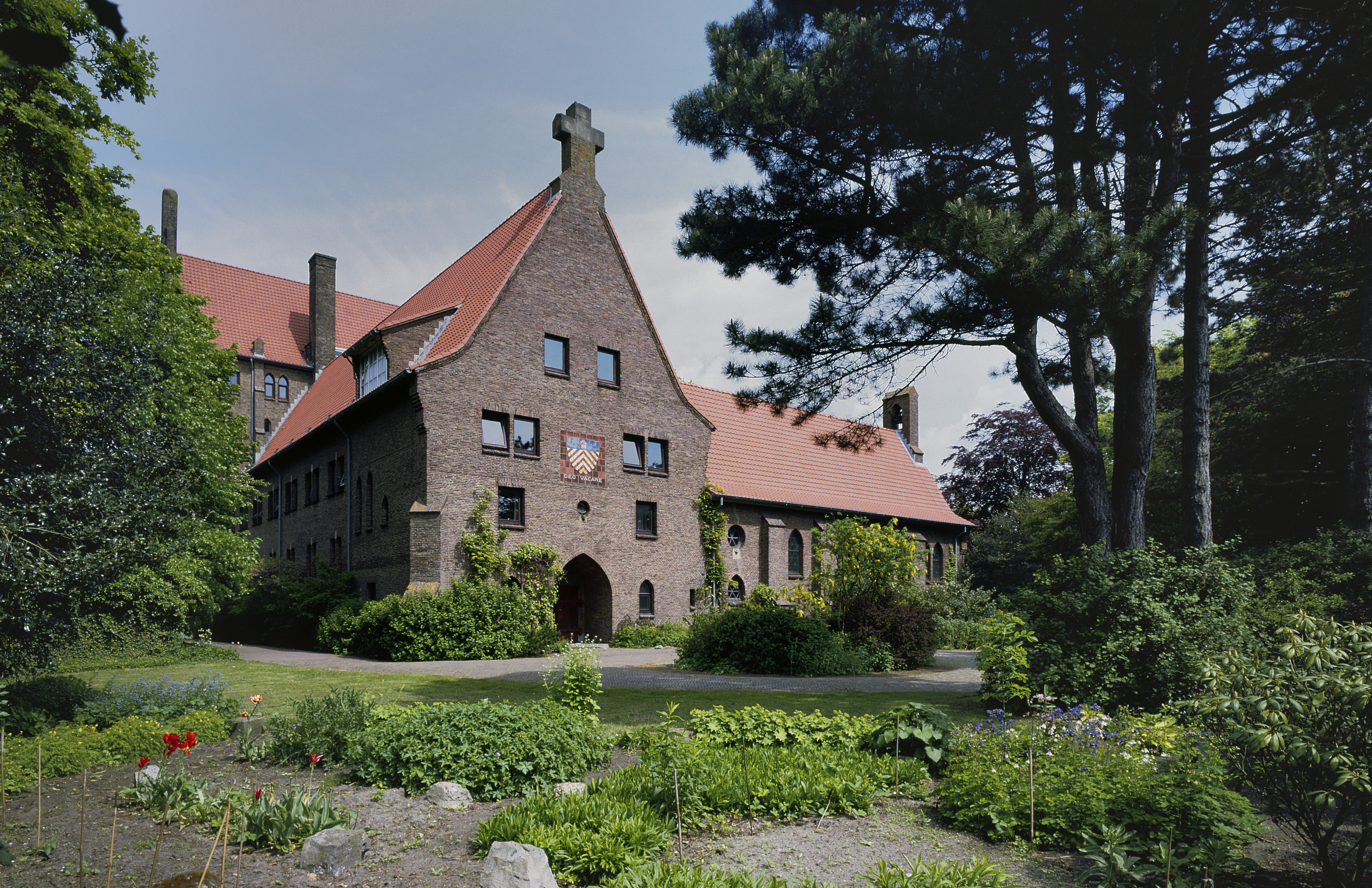
A view of the rebuilt Egmond Abbey in 2003.

Egmond Abbey or St. Adalbert's Abbey (Dutch: Abdij van Egmond, Sint-Adelbertabdij) is a Benedictine monastery of the Congregation of the Annunciation, situated in Egmond-Binnen, in the municipality of Bergen, in the Dutch province of North Holland. Founded in 920-925, and destroyed during the Reformation, it was re-founded in 1935 as the present Sint-Adelbertabdij, in the Diocese of Haarlem.

== History ==
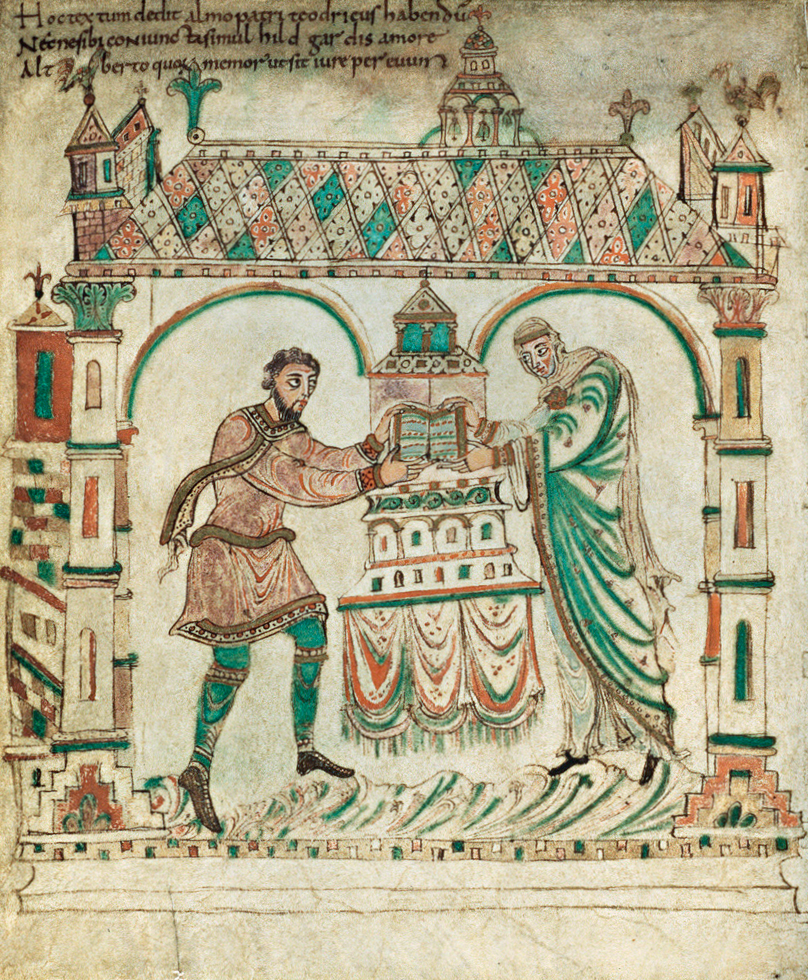
Illumination from the Egmond Gospels

Egmond was the oldest monastery of the Holland region. According to tradition, the Benedictine abbey was founded by Dirk I, Count of Holland, in about 920-925. It was a nunnery erected near a small wooden church built over the grave of Saint Adalbert. In about 950 work began on a stone church to replace the wooden one, as a gift from Dirk II, Count of Holland, and his wife Hildegard, to house the relics of Saint Adalbert. The consecration of the new church apparently took place in or shortly after 975, and is recorded in the Egmond Gospels, presented to the abbey by Dirk. At the same time a community of Benedictine monks from Saint Peter's Abbey, Ghent replaced the nuns, who under their abbess Erlinde, daughter of Count Dirk, were transferred to a newly established nunnery, Bennebroek Abbey.

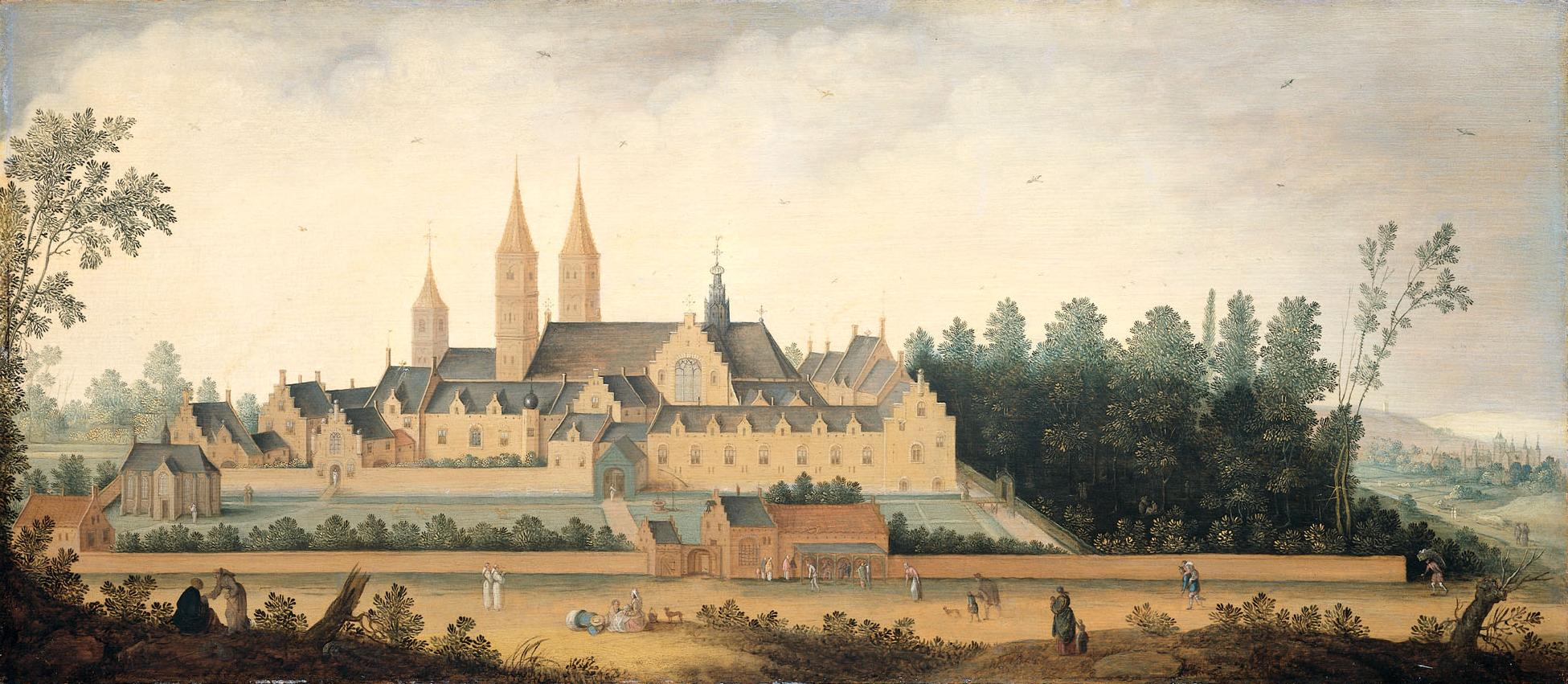
A view of Egmond Abbey, by Claes Dircksz van der Heck, 1638.

The abbey had many property and feudal rights. Its library and scriptorium were very important. Monks served as scribes in the ducal chancery. Dirk I, the founder, was buried there, as were many subsequent counts of Holland and members of their families, including Dirk II, Arnulf, Dirk III, Floris I, Dirk V, and Floris II. Egbert, the son of Dirk II, was educated at Egmond and later became Archbishop of Trier.

Count Lamoral, owner of the nearby castle, was beheaded in 1568 in Brussels by the Spanish regime, and this started the Dutch Revolt. Shortly afterwards, in 1573, the abbey was dissolved and laid waste, just before the Spanish siege of Alkmaar, on the orders of Diederik Sonoy, to prevent it being used by the Spanish. The abbey's income was diverted by the stadtholder to the financing of his educational project, the newly formed Leiden University.

== Relationship to Egmond Castle ==
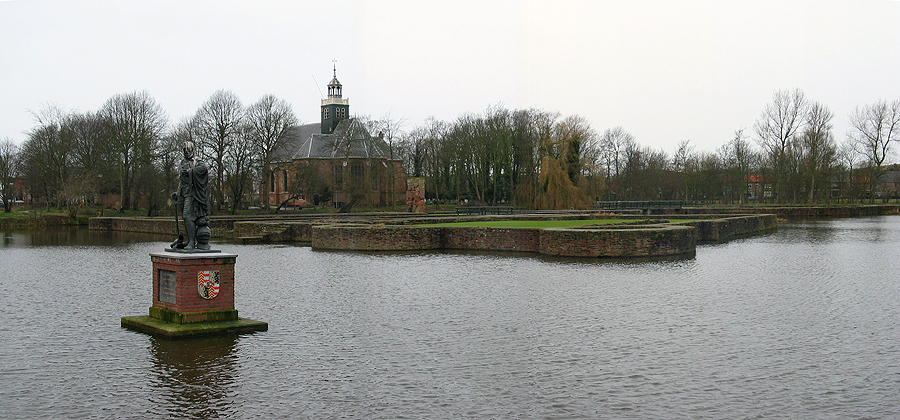
A statue of Lamoraal stands in the middle of the old moat and behind him the Protestant church can be seen, that was built on top of the ruins of the old castle Egmond.

North of the abbey is the site of Egmond Castle in Egmond aan den Hoef. The castle was built by the knight Berwout van Egmond in 1129, who was paid by the Count of Holland to represent him, protect the abbey and collect the rents, as Voogd. This was the origin of the House of Egmond. The relationship quickly turned into a power struggle between the Egmond family and the abbots that lasted for centuries. Just like the abbey, the castle was destroyed in 1573. The chapel was later restored by the Dutch Protestant church, but the castle was never rebuilt. The foundations are still visible and the land surrounding the old moat and foundations has been turned into a park.

== Sint-Adelbertabdij ==
In 1933 a new Benedictine community, the Sint-Adelbertabdij, was founded on the site of the former Egmond Abbey, and was again dedicated to Saint Adalbert. The first buildings, designed by Alexander Kropholler (nl) were constructed in 1935. and the community was repopulated with monks (from the Benedictine abbey in Oosterhout). Buildings were refurbished and extended in the late 1940s and early 1950s; the monastery was elevated to an abbey in 1950. The farmlands were put back to use, though since 1989 however the agricultural lands have been let to a farmer. Candle-making started in 1945, to support the community, and later a pottery workplace was added.

In 1984 the relics of Saint Adalbert were returned here, having been kept safe in Haarlem since the destruction of the medieval monastery in the 16th century, and are enshrined beneath the altar.

In the spring of 2003 the monks had solar panels installed which were promptly stolen two weeks later, a loss of €20,000. An online fundraising was organized to help pay for new panels.

In December 2021, the Abbey donated a relic of Saint Nicholas to the Basilica of Saint Nicholas in Amsterdam. Said to be a fragment of the saint's rib, the bone had been in the custody of the Abbey since 1087.

Their abbey shop sells locally produced cheese and beer from Brouwerij Egmond, which is produced under the name Sancti Adalberti.

== Legacy ==
Many artefacts from the old abbey have been recovered in the years since the 'beeldenstorm' of 1568, such as the altarpiece of 1530, and the Egmond Tympanum, a 12th-century tympanum originally set over the portal of the west front of the abbey church, which since 1842 has been preserved in the Rijksmuseum. At first it was assumed that all the abbey's possessions had been burned, but in fact they had been sold by the Protestant leader who dissolved the abbey, Diederik Sonoy, before the buildings were destroyed. In recent decades the current monastery has been able to recover many lost relics, or to obtain information about their whereabouts. The old abbey had been of great importance to artists, and much of that art has survived, against all odds.

Moreover, in the intervening period from 1568 until the remaining ruins were finally demolished in about 1800, the abbey and the associated castle ruins served as an inspiration in its damaged state to many artists who visited Bergen, Schoorl or Egmond to paint the ruins, among them Jacob van Ruisdael in 1655-60.

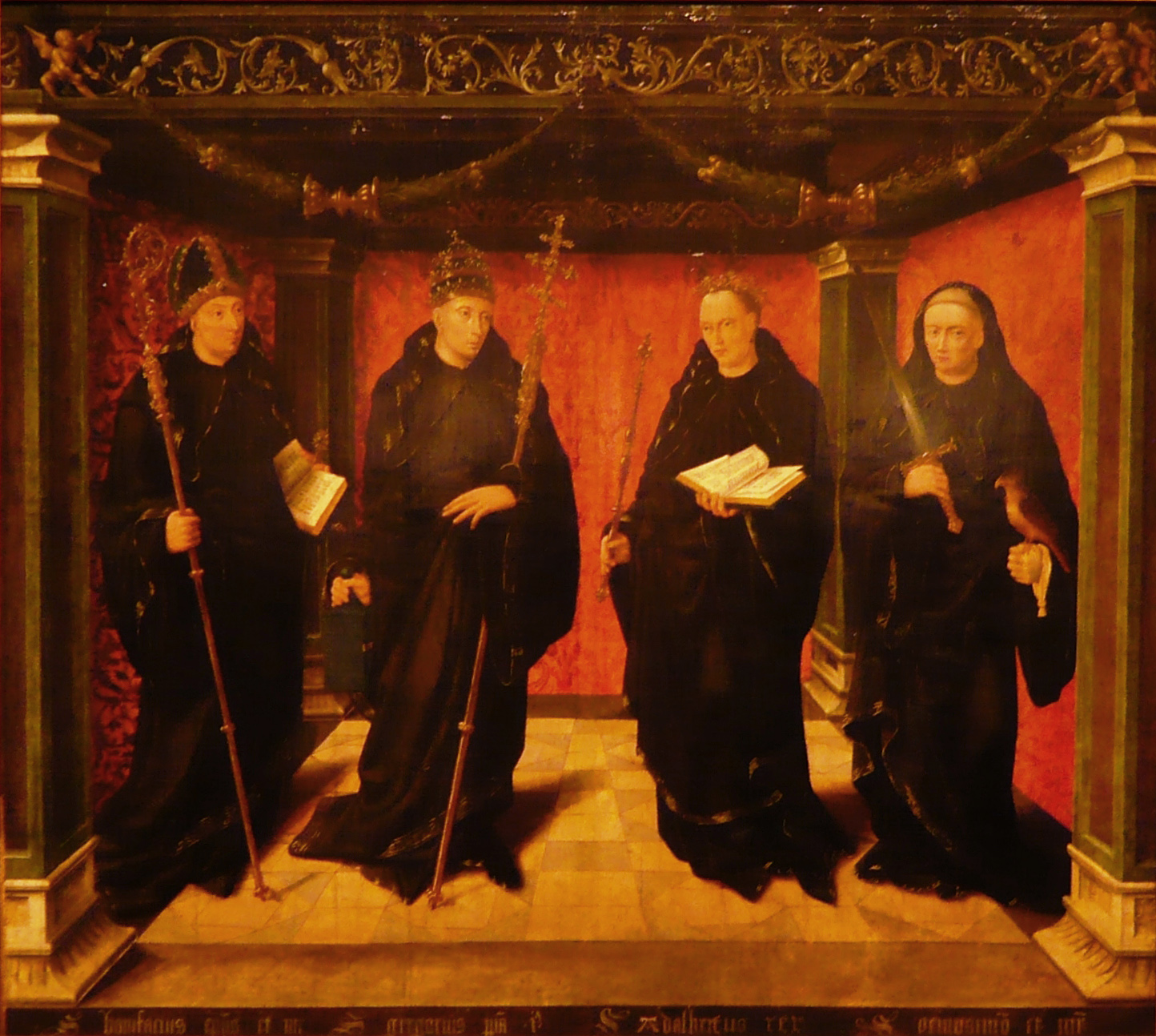
Egmond Abbey altarpiece of 1530 by the Egmond monk Jan Joesten van Hillegom

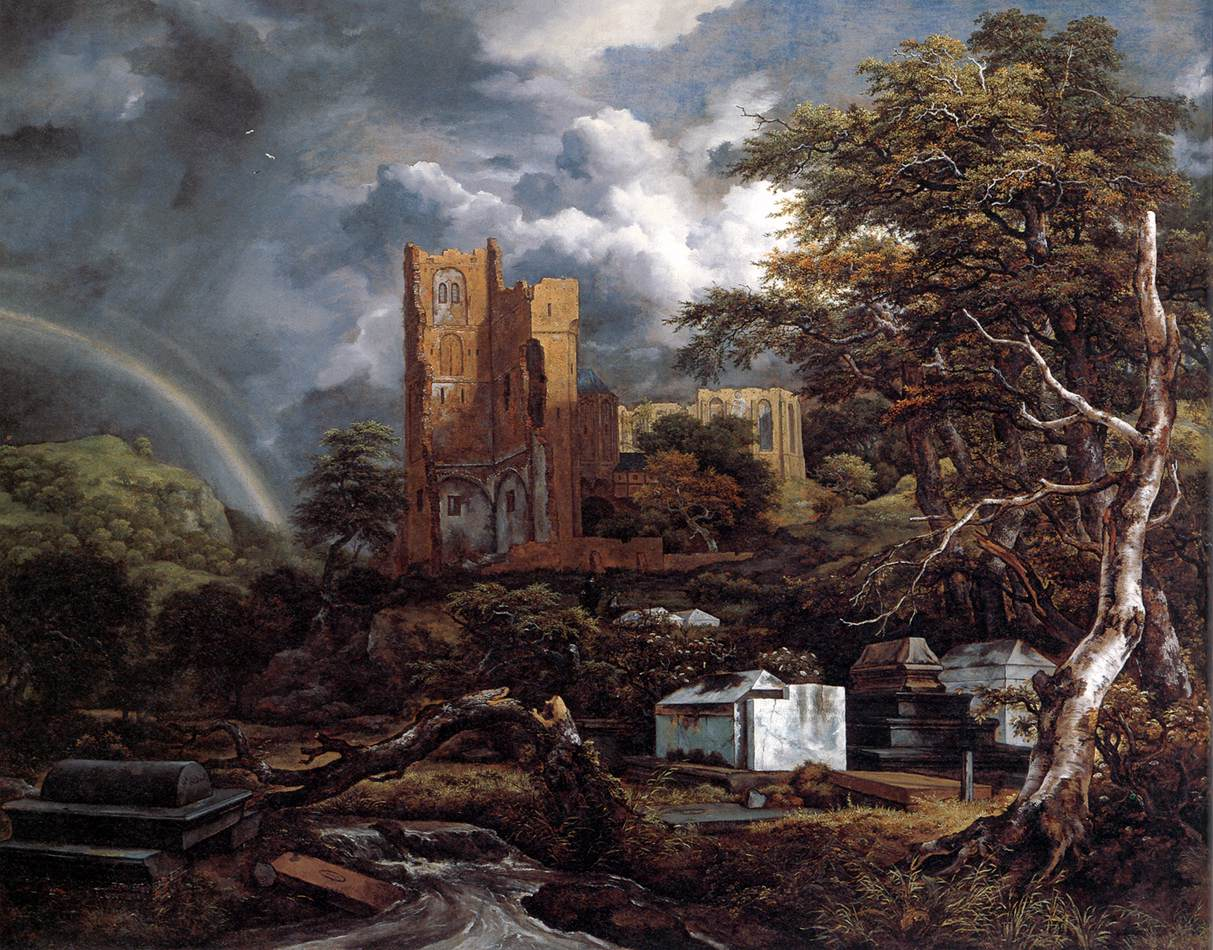
The Jewish Cemetery by Jacob van Ruisdael with the ruins of Egmond Abbey

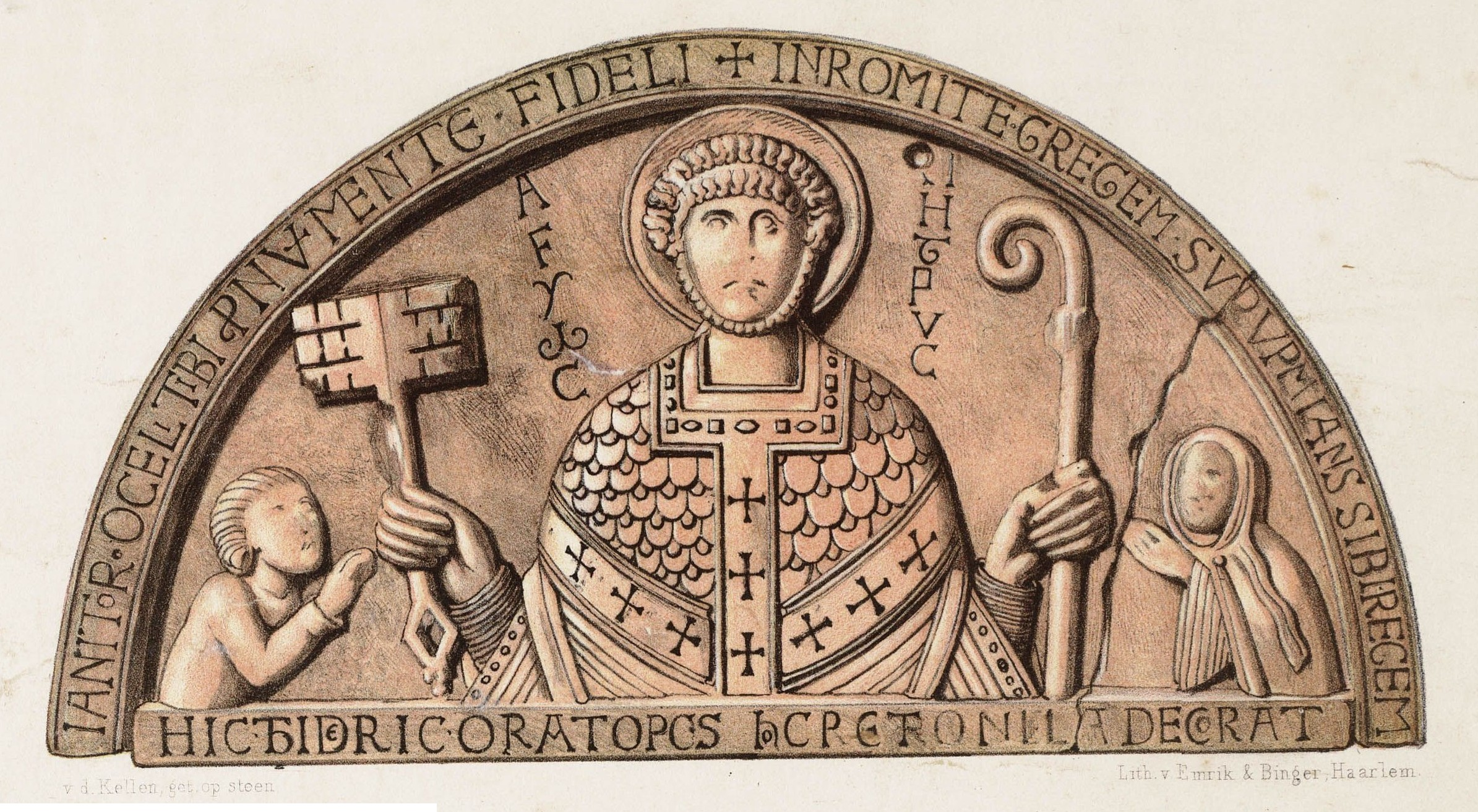
The Egmond Tympanum, depicting Saint Peter between Dirk VI, Count of Holland, and his mother and Countess Petronilla (chromolithograph of 1860/61)

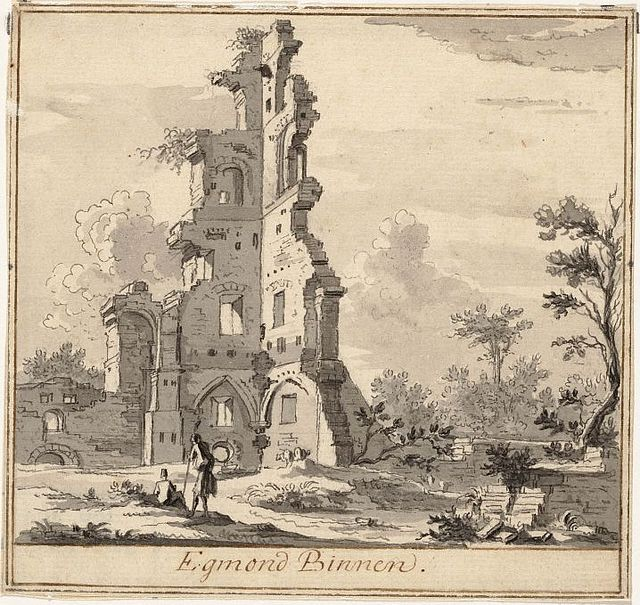
Egmond Abbey ruins, 1725
