= Geoffroy de Boulogne =

- Bishop of Paris
- In office: 1061 - 1095
- Predecessor: Humbert de Vergy
- Successor: Guillaume de Montfort
- Other post: Archdeacon of Arras

Personal details
- Died: 1095
- Parents: Eustace I, Count of Boulogne; Matilda of Louvain

Geoffroy de Boulogne (died 1095) was the bishop of Paris from 1061 until his death and was also Chancellor of France.

== Life ==
Geoffroy de Boulogne was the son of Eustace I, Count of Boulogne and Matilda of Louvain. He was the Archdeacon of Arras, before being appointed bishop of Paris in 1061. This was in part thanks to his family's ties to Baldwin V of Flanders the, at the time, regent for Philip I. Geoffroy would later follow Baldwin in the War of the Flemish Succession of 1070 and 1071. He was Chancellor of France various times. Firstly, between 1075 and 1077. Then, from 1081 and 1085, when he was elected archchancellor, position that he held until his death.

In 1074, de Boulogne convocated a council in Paris, discussing a decree of Gregory VII's condemning priests who had concubines. This decree was apparently contested by the members of the clergy.

In 1077, he was accused of simony through the papal legate Hugh of Die, together with his nephew Geoffrey, Bishops of Chartres, who was excommunicated. To clear his name, Geoffrey of Boulogne went to Rome. On the way, he was robbed by bandits, reaching the city without any money. Despite that, he was pardoned by Gregory VII.

De Boulogne was present to the council of Reims regarding Philip I's divorce and remarriage in 1094. It is unclear what where his positions on the matter. He would die the following year, in 1095.

Catholic Church titles
Preceded by Humbert de Vergy	Bishop of Paris; 1061 - 1095	Succeeded by Guillaume de Montfort
