= Dirk I of Holland =

Dirk I
- Count of West Frisia
- Reign: c. 896 – c. 928 or 939
- Predecessor: Gerolf
- Successor: Dirk II
- Born: c. 870
- Died: 928/944
- Burial: Egmond Abbey
- Spouse: Geva
- Issue: Dirk II
- House: House of Gerulfings
- Father: Possibly Gerolf or Radbod, Prince of the Frisians

Dirk I (Frisian Durk I or Diderik, Latin Theoderic or Thidericus Fresonie, German Dietrich) was count of West Frisia, later known as the County of Holland. He is thought to have been in office from c. 896 to c. 928 or 939.

== 'Count in Frisia' ==
The actual title of count Dirk I was 'count in Frisia'. Dirk is thought to be a son of Gerulf II, the preceding 'count in Frisia', who is named by some sources as one of the counts who assassinated their Viking overlord Godfrid 'the Sea King' at a place named Herespich (modern Spijk) in 885.

Regarding Dirk I, almost nothing is known of his life, a situation further clouded by the present-day hypothesis that he had a son, Dirk (numbered Dirk I bis, to avoid confusion with the already established numbering), who succeeded him instead of the traditional view that he was succeeded by his supposed son Dirk II.

== Founding of Egmond Abbey ==
In 922 Dirk was present at a place called Bladella (present-day Bladel, in the extreme south of the Dutch province of North Brabant), at which he received certain lands ('at a place called Egmond') from the West Frankish king Charles the Simple. Dirk subsequently erected a nunnery at the said lands, at which nuns prayed continuously for the wellbeing of the comital dynasty. This was the origin of the later Egmond Abbey.

Under Dirk II the wooden convent was rebuilt in stone to house the relics of Saint Adalbert. Adalbert was not well known at that time, but he was said to have preached Christianity in the immediate surroundings two centuries earlier. The monastery was also changed to house a community of Benedictine monks from Ghent, replacing the nuns. Count Dirk and many of his descendants were buried in the abbey church.

== Bibliography ==
- Zuijderduijn, Jaco (2009). "Central Government". Medieval Capital Markets. Brill.
- Cordfunke, Graven en Gravinnen van het Hollandse Huis (1986).

Preceded by Gerolf	Count of Friesland west of the Vlie; 921–928	Succeeded by Dirk II
