= Dirk II of Holland =

Dirk II
- Count of West Frisia
- Reign: 928/944 – 988
- Predecessor: Dirk I, Count of Holland
- Successor: Arnulf, Count of Holland
- Born: 920/930
- Died: 6 May 988; Egmond, West Friesland, Duchy of Lower Lorraine
- Burial: Egmond, West Friesland, Duchy of Lower Lorraine
- Spouse: Hildegard of Flanders
- Issue: Arnulf, Count of West Frisia; Egbert, Archbishop of Trier; Erlinde, Abbess of Egmond
- House: House of Gerufings
- Father: Dirk I, Count of West Frisia
- Mother: Geva

Dirk II or Theoderic II (920/930 – 6 May 988) was a count in West Frisia, and ancestor of the counts of Holland. He was the son and heir of Dirk I and his wife Geva (or Gerberge).

== Career ==
In 983 Emperor Otto III confirmed Dirk's rights within the Duchy of Lower Lorraine to properties and territories in the counties of Maasland, Kinhem (Kennemerland) and Texla (Texel), thus stretching along the entire Hollandic coast, as well as inland. Count Dirk II built a fortress near Vlaardingen, which was later the site of the Battle of Vlaardingen between his grandson Dirk III and an Imperial army under Godfrey II, Duke of Lower Lorraine.

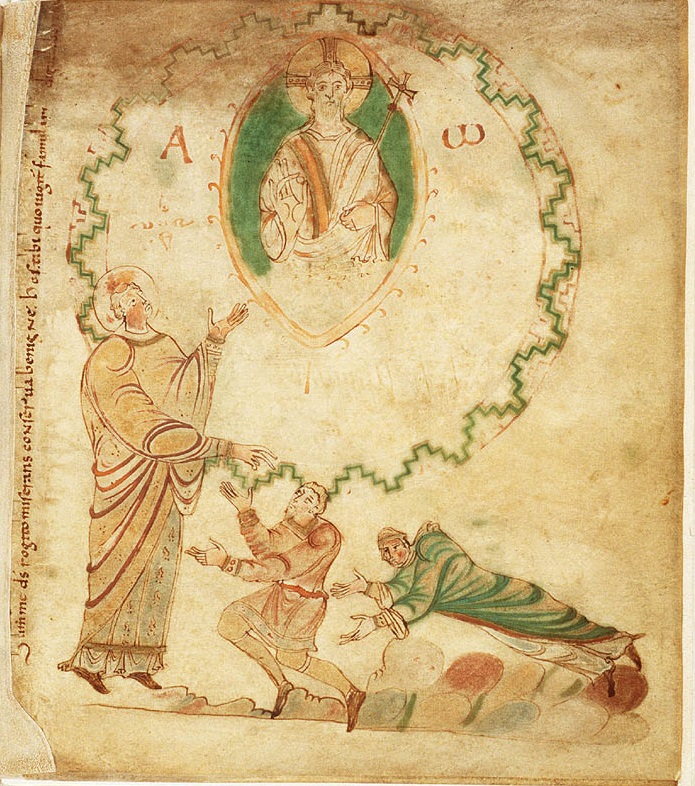
Dirk and his wife implore Saint Adalbert, illustration from the Egmond Gospels

Starting in 950, Dirk II rebuilt Egmond Abbey and its wooden church in stone, in order to house the relics of Saint Adalbert. Adalbert was not well known at that time, but he was said to have preached Christianity in the region two centuries earlier. The abbey was given to a community of Benedictine monks from Ghent, who replaced the nuns originally housed there, probably in the 970s. His daughter Erlint, Erlinde or Herlinde, who was abbess at the time, was made abbess of the newly founded Bennebroek Abbey instead.

== Family ==
Dirk married Hildegarde who is thought to be a daughter of Count Arnulf of Flanders. They had three known children. His son Arnulf became Count of Holland and Frisia after Dirk's death. The younger son Egbert became Archbishop of Trier in 977. His daughter Erlinde (or Herlinde) was an abbess.

Dirk died in 988 and was buried in the stone church at Egmond Abbey. Hildegard died two years later and was also buried there.

== Sources ==
- Arblaster, Paul (2006). A History of the Low Countries. Springer. ISBN 978-1-137-61185-7.
- Geerts.com: History of Holland
- Frisia Coast Trail: The Abbey of Egmond and the Rise of the Gerulfings

Preceded by Dirk I	Count of Friesland west of the Vlie; 928/949–988	Succeeded by Arnulf
