= Adelolf of Boulogne =

Member of the House of Flanders (died 933)

Adelolf, Count of Boulogne
- Died: 13 November 933
- Issue: Arnulf II, Count of Boulogne
- House: House of Flanders
- Father: Baldwin II, Count of Flanders
- Mother: Ælfthryth of Wessex

Adelolf, Count of Boulogne (Note: His name is variously spelled Adelulf, Adalulf, Adalolf, and, in French, Adalolphe; in Latin, Adalolphus.) (died 933), was a younger brother of Arnulf I, Count of Flanders and was granted the County of Boulogne by his father.

He was a son of Baldwin II, Count of Flanders, and of Ælfthryth, daughter of Alfred the Great. He was probably named for his maternal great-grandfather, King Æthelwulf of Wessex. Baldwin II's extensive lands and many offices in what is now the north of modern France and the west of Belgium were divided among his sons on his death in 918. The elder, Arnulf, became Count of Flanders while Adelolf succeeded his father as count of Saint-Pol, Count of Boulogne and of Thérouanne. He was also the lay abbot of the Abbey of Saint Bertinus (Saint-Bertin) at Saint-Omer.

In 926 Adelolf was sent as an ambassador to his maternal first cousin King Æthelstan of England by Count Hugh the Great, effective ruler of northern France under Rudolph, Duke of Burgundy, who had been elected king of France in 923. Adelolf was to seek the English king's agreement to a marriage between Hugh and another of Æthelstan's sisters. Among the lavish gifts sent to Æthelstan, an avid collector of relics, were said to be the sword of the Roman Emperor Constantine the Great and the Holy Lance. The embassy was a success and Hugh was married to Æthelstan's half-sister Eadhild. In 933, Æthelstan's half-brother Edwin was drowned and his body cast ashore. Adelolf received the body of his kinsman with honour and took it to the Abbey of Saint Bertin for burial.

Adelolf was the father of Arnulf II, Count of Boulogne († 971), and of an illegitimate son named Baldwin (died 973) who was guardian of Arnulf II, Count of Flanders. Adelolf died November 13, 933. He was buried at Saint-Bertin.

== Notes ==
Adelolf of Boulogne House of Boulogne Born: unknown Died: 13 November 933
Preceded by Erkenger	Count of Boulogne; 918–933	Succeeded by Arnulf I
