= Lambert II of Louvain =

Count of Leuven from 1033 to 1054

Lambert II
- Count of Louvain
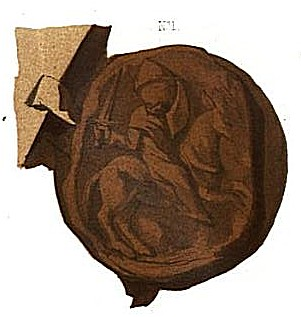
- Died: 19 June 1054; Tournai
- Noble family: House of Reginar
- Spouse: Oda of Verdun
- Issue: Henry II, Count of Louvain; Régnier; Gerberge
- Father: Lambert I, Count of Louvain
- Mother: Gerberga of Lower Lorraine

Lambert II (died Tournai, 19 June 1054) was count of Leuven between 1033 and 1054. Lambert was the son of Lambert I of Louvain and Gerberga, daughter of Charles, Duke of Lower Lorraine.

According to the Vita Gudilae (recorded between 1048–1051) he followed his brother Henry I of Louvain as Count of Leuven. Lambert scorned both temporal and spiritual authorities and in 1054 even took up arms against Holy Roman Emperor Henry III. He was defeated and lost his life at Tournai.

During his reign, Brussels began its growth. Lambert arranged to transfer the remains of Saint Gudula to the Church of St. Michael. This church, thereafter known as the Church of St. Michael and St. Gudula, later became the Cathedral of St. Michael and St. Gudula. Lambert also constructed a fortress on the Coudenberg hill.

Lambert II died in 1054.

== Family ==
Lambert of Louvain married Uda of Lorraine (also called Oda of Verdun), daughter of Gothelo I, Duke of Lorraine. Their children were:

- Henry II, Count of Louvain, who married Adela of Orthen, a daughter of Count Everard of Orthen (or Betuwe).
- Adela of Louvain, married Otto I, Margrave of Meissen, Count of Weimar. Later married Dedi I, Margrave of the Saxon Ostmark.
- Reginar (Rainier) of Louvain. Killed in the battle of Hesbaye in 1077.

== Sources ==
- Bachrach, Bernard S.; Bachrach, David S.; Leese, Michael, eds. (2018). Deeds of the Bishops of Cambrai, Translation and Commentary. Routledge.
- Tanner, Heather (2004). Families, Friends and Allies: Boulogne and Politics in Northern France and England, c.879-1160. Brill.
- Robinson, I.S., ed. (2015). The annals of Lampert of Hersfeld. Manchester University Press.
