= Gerolf of Holland =

- Count of West Frisia
- Reign: ca. 885 – 895 or 896
- Successor: Dirk I
- Born: ca. 850
- Died: 895/896
- Issue: Waldger, Count of Lek and IJssel; Dirk I
- House: House of Gerulfings

Gerolf or Gerulf (Old Dutch: Gērulf; c. 850 – 895/896) was the second count of this name who is attested in the area of Friesland (which also included Holland at the time). Gerolf's main area of power seems to have been in Kennemerland. Count Gerolf is often regarded as the founder of the County of Holland, although the actual name "Holland" is from a later time. His ancestry is unclear, but he may have been a son or, more likely, a grandson of the earlier Gerolf, who was a count in the area of Frisia at the time of the reign of Emperor Louis the Pious (fl. 833) and who later joined a monastery. The earlier Gerolf died in 855. There is some limited and vague evidence that this earlier Gerolf was a son of a certain Theodoric, who in turn supposedly descended from the Frisian king Redbad (d. 719). Count Gerolf is often identified as the father of Count Dirk I and seen as the founder of the first house of the Counts of Holland, which ruled the county until it was inherited by John II of Hainaut in 1299.

== Formation of the County of Holland ==
Since the Treaty of Verdun (concluded in 843) Frisia and other parts of the present-day Netherlands had become a part of, at first Middle Francia, then after 855 Lotharingia, and finally after the Treaty of Meerssen it was incorporated into East Francia in 870. However, ever since the 840s a series of Viking leaders had been installed in the region (as a means of defense against further incursions) and they were the de facto rulers of the region. It was not until 885 that this situation was put to an end by the murder of Godfrid, Duke of Frisia at a place called Herespich (identified as modern Spijk). According to some sources Count Gerolf and Eberhard Count of Hamaland (who was later appointed Margrave of Frisia) were foremost amongst the conspirators in this plot. In the Chronicon of Regino of Prüm, on the other hand, there is no mention of Gerulf as taking part of this plan. Instead, according to this version, the murdering scheme would have been instigated by Emperor Charles and a certain Duke Henry. If so, it was, possibly, then, effectuated by Eberhard. The same Eberhard was hunted out and killed by Gerolf's son Waldger in 898, but the origin of that conflict is unknown, a possible explanation being that Waldger (who probably descended from Frisian royalty, see below) contested Eberhard's recent appointment as Margrave. It might be important remembering, in face of this scenario, how Merovingian and, most particularly, Carolingian leaders had hunted heathen Frisians just before the Frankish society had to deal with the Viking expansion. In this sense, it is interesting, as well, to observe how far the Gerulfingian House of Holland, during the centuries to follow, would pose an obstacle for the full grasp of this region by the Holy Roman Empire.

On 4 August 889, Count Gerolf received a reward for his role in the defeat of the Vikings. On this date Arnulf of Carinthia, King of East Francia, granted him a number of lands and properties in full ownership. Firstly, he was granted an area outside his county, in Teisterbant, which consisted of a number of farms and houses in, amongst others, Tiel, Aalburg and Asch. Also he was granted additional property in his own county, consisting of a forest and agricultural lands, situated somewhere between the mouth of the Old Rhine and (presumably) Bennebroek.

== Doubts about the founding of the House of Holland ==
Only since the late nineteenth century has Gerolf been regarded as the founder of the House of Holland. This is based on a poem composed around 1120. It locates the tombs where members of the house were interred. The poem begins with "The first Dirk, brother of Waldger was a glorious man ..." In another work Waldger is named "Waldgarius Freso, Gerulfi filius", which translates as "Waldger the Frisian, son of Gerolf".

However, it appears unusual that, following the death of Gerolf, the eldest son Waldger received Teisterbant, while the younger brother Dirk inherited the comital title, although the title wasn't necessarily inheritable, but often rather by appointment. Also surprising is that Waldger's eldest son was named Radboud and a possible second son (or other relation) of his was named Hatto. It was customary in those days, that the eldest son received the name of his father's father. It is therefore thought that Gerolf was not the father but the foster-father of Waldger and Dirk. Filius in this case meaning foster-son.

The most likely candidate for the biological father of Dirk and Waldger is Redbad II, prince of the Frisians. Waldger's nickname Freso may also be indicative of this origin. This prince Radboud fell in battle in 874, while repelling a Viking incursion together with Reginar "Longneck" (Count of Maasgau, later Duke of Lorraine). At this time Dirk and Waldger were still infants. It is further speculated that because Gerolf's sister may have been Dirk and Waldger's mother, her brother acted as her children's guardian after their father had been killed. While Dirk and Waldger were still minors, Gerolf, as guardian, presumably was then appointed count of the threatened area to protect it from the Vikings. Later on, after Gerolf had died without leaving any sons of his own, Dirk then inherited the fief or was appointed as its next count. Possibly Waldger may have received (the properties in) Teisterbant because this was an allodium of the family, the comital title and territories being an imperial appointment.

Yet another possibility is that Dirk was called Waldger's brother because one of them was married to the other's sister (i.e. Gerolf's daughter, making him a son-in-law of Gerolf's). Alternatively, Gerolf may have simply been, as is often assumed, the father of Dirk. The reason that Dirk and not (the elder) Waldger was appointed count is possibly also Waldger's feud with Eberhard of Hamaland, the newly appointed Margrave of Frisia, whom he murdered in 898.

== Notes ==
Preceded by uncertain	Count of Friesland west of the Vlie ca. 875–895/896	Succeeded by Dirk I
