= Hildegard of Flanders =

10th century Flemish countess

Hildegard of Flanders (died 990) was a Flemish countess in the 10th century. She is one of the earliest-depicted people in Dutch history.

== Biography ==
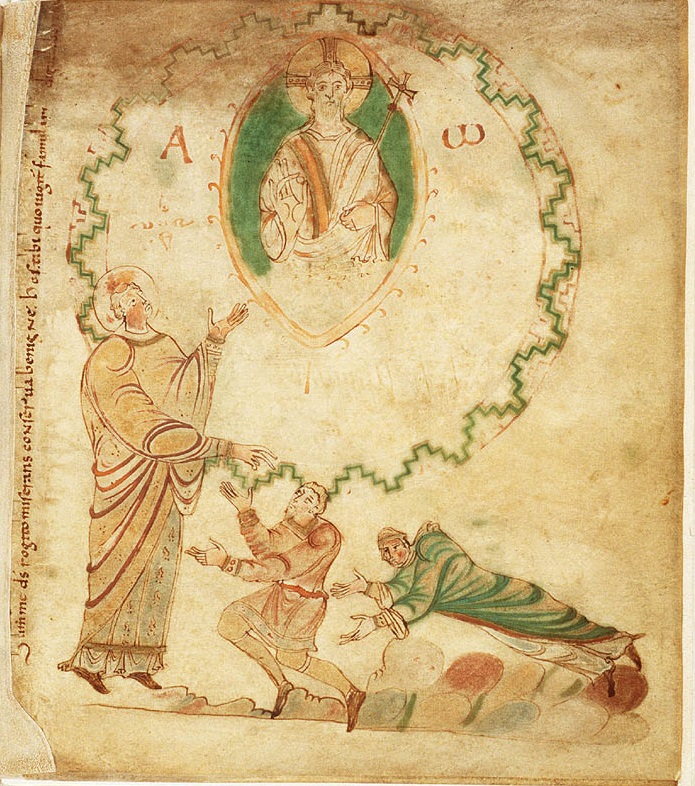
Hildegard and Dirk implore Saint Adalbert, illustration from the Egmond Gospels

Hildegard was the daughter of Arnulf I, Count of Flanders, making her descendant from the Carolingian dynasty. She married Dirk II, Count of Holland and died in 990.

Together with her husband she donated the so-called Egmond Gospels to the abbey of Egmond. Hildegard's depiction in this book, together with her husband Dirk II, are the oldest known depiction of individuals from the Low Countries. It shows the couple presenting the Gospel to the abbey and another one of the couple invoking the intercession of Adalbert before Christ's throne.

== Issue ==
Out of her marriage with Dirk she gave birth to the following people:

- Arnulf, Count of Holland (d. 993)
- Egbert, Archbishop of Trier (fl. 977–993)

== Sources ==
- Arblaster, Paul (26 October 2018). A History of the Low Countries. Bloomsbury Publishing. ISBN 978-1-137-61188-8.
- Jeep, John M. (5 July 2017). Routledge Revivals: Medieval Germany (2001): An Encyclopedia. Taylor & Francis. ISBN 978-1-351-66540-7.
- Selderhuis, Herman J. (10 December 2014). Handbook of Dutch Church History. Vandenhoeck & Ruprecht. ISBN 978-3-647-55787-8.
- Weis, Frederick Lewis; Sheppard, Walter Lee; Beall, William Ryland; Beall, Kaleen E. (2004). Ancestral Roots of Certain American Colonists who Came to America Before 1700: Lineages from Alfred the Great, Charlemagne, Malcolm of Scotland, Robert the Strong, and Other Historical Individuals. Genealogical Publishing Com. ISBN 978-0-8063-1752-6.
