= Adelina of Holland =

Dutch noblewoman

- Other names: Adelheid de Hollande
- Born: c. 990; Ghent, East Flanders, Belgium
- Died: c. 1045; Saint-Riquier, Somme, France
- Noble family: Holland
- Spouses: Baldwin II, Count of Boulogne; Enguerrand I of Ponthieu
- Issue: Eustace I of Boulogne
- Father: Arnulf, Count of Holland
- Mother: Lutgardis of Luxemburg

Adelina of Holland (c. 990 – c. 1045) was the daughter of Arnulf, Count of Holland, and Lutgardis of Luxemburg. She married firstly Baldwin II, Count of Boulogne (with whom she had Eustace I of Boulogne), and secondly Enguerrand I of Ponthieu.
