= Arnulf of Holland =

Arnulf
- Count in Frisia
- Reign: 988–993
- Predecessor: Dirk II
- Successor: Dirk III
- Born: 950/955; Ghent, Flanders
- Died: September 18, 993; Winkel, West-Friesland
- Burial: Egmond
- Spouse: Lutgard of Luxemburg
- Issue: Dirk III; Siegfried (known as Sicco); Adelina of Holland
- House: of Holland
- Father: Dirk II
- Mother: Hildegard of Flanders

Arnulf, also known as Arnoud or Arnold, succeeded his father in 988 as Count of Frisia, which by around AD 1100 would come to be referred to as the county of Holland. He was born in 951 in Ghent and because of this he is also known as Arnulf of Ghent. Arnulf was the son of Dirk II, Count of Holland and Hildegard of Flanders (daughter of count Arnulf I). He was named after his maternal grandfather.

== Career ==
Arnulf is first mentioned (together with his parents) in 970. Like his father, his name appears in numerous Flemish documents at the time. In 983 Arnulf accompanied Emperor Otto II and future Emperor Otto III on their journey to Verona and Rome. As count he managed to expand his territories southwards. Arnulf donated several properties to Egmond Abbey, amongst others Hillegersberg (which was previously called Bergan, but renamed after Arnulf's mother) and Overschie, which may have been rewards for the land-clearing activities of the monks of Egmond.

Arnulf was the first count to come into conflict with the West Frisians and in 993 he invaded deep into their territory, but on 18 September of that year he was defeated and killed in a battle near Winkel in West-Friesland. His son Dirk was still a boy at this time, but Arnulf's widow Luitgard managed to retain the county for her son with support from first Emperor Otto III and later her brother-in-law, Emperor Henry II.

== Family ==
In May 980 Arnulf married Lutgard of Luxemburg, a daughter of Siegfried, Count of Luxemburg. The couple had (at least) two sons; the future Count Dirk III and Siegfried (also known as Sicco). Arnulf, his wife and his sons were all buried at Egmond.

Arnulf and Lutgard had a daughter, Adelina of Holland, (Note: "Andre Duchesne states that Adelvie was the daughter of Arnulf count of Gent (d. c. 1018) and his wife Lietgarde; (Duchesne 1631): 38. He offers no proof and I have found no direct evidence.") who was married to Baldwin II, Count of Boulogne and Enguerrand I, Count of Ponthieu.

On 20 September 993 Liutgard donated her properties at Rugge to Saint Peter's abbey of Ghent for the soul of her husband. In June 1005 she made peace with the West-Frisians through mediation by Emperor Henry.

== Sources ==
- Frisia Coast Trail, The Abbey of Egmond and the Rise of the Gerulfings
- Cordfunke, Graven en Gravinnen van het Hollandse Huis (1986)
- Tanner, Heather (2004). Families, Friends and Allies: Boulogne and Politics in Northern France and England, c.879-1160. Brill.

Preceded by Dirk II	Count of Friesland west of the Vlie; 988–993	Succeeded by Dirk III
