= Hanzinne (village) =

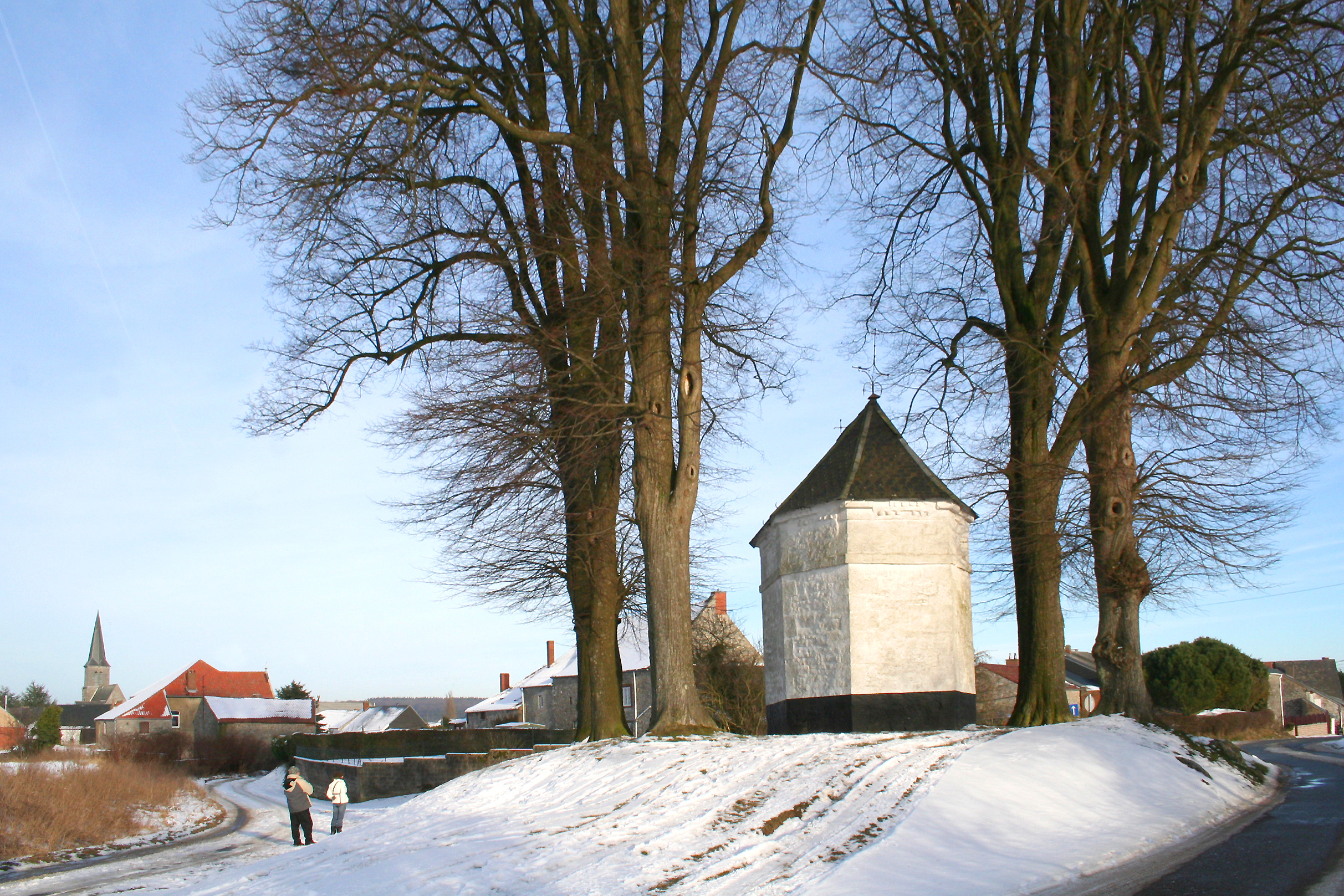
- Hanzinne, the chapel of Saint-Oger (1642)

- Location within Belgium Location within Europe
- Coordinates: 50°18′36″N 04°32′36″E
- Country: Belgium
- Region: Wallonia
- Province: Namur
- Municipality: Florennes

Hanzinne (French pronunciation: [ɑ̃zin]) is a village of Wallonia in the municipality of Florennes, located in the province of Namur, Belgium.

The area has been inhabited at least since Neolithic times, as evidenced by archaeological discoveries. The village church dates from 1870, and contains a baptismal font from the 16th century and stained glass windows dating from 1904. In addition, a chapel dedicated to Saint-Oger from 1642 is a listed building.
