= Erkenger =

Count of Boulogne, France, 886 to 921

Count of Boulogne
- Reign: 886–921
- Successor: Adelolf
- Died: after 921

Erkenger (died after 921) was count of Boulogne from 886 to 921.

== Life ==
In 886, during the Viking siege of Paris, Erkenger was sent by the city's bishop, Joscelin, to call for the help of Henry, Margrave of the Franks.

During the conflict between Charles the Simple and Odo of France, Erkenger kept his alliance with the former. This allowed Ralph, younger brother of Baldwin II, Margrave of Flanders, to chase out both him and Herbert I, Count of Vermandois from their domains. Erkanger was allowed to return after pledging fealty to the new king of the Western Franks, Odo.

After Charles was crowned king in 898, Erkanger was granted the county of Melun.

On 7 November 921, Erkanger escorted Charles to his meeting with Henry the Fowler. The meeting took place on the shores of the Rhine, near Bonn.

Despite the de facto rule of the counts of Flanders, Erkanger kept his title until the capture of Charles by Herbert I, Count of Vermandois.

The exact date of Erkenger's death is unknown.

French nobility
Preceded by New title	Count of Boulogne; 886 - 922	Succeeded by Adelolf
