= Coenraet Waumans =

Flemish engraver

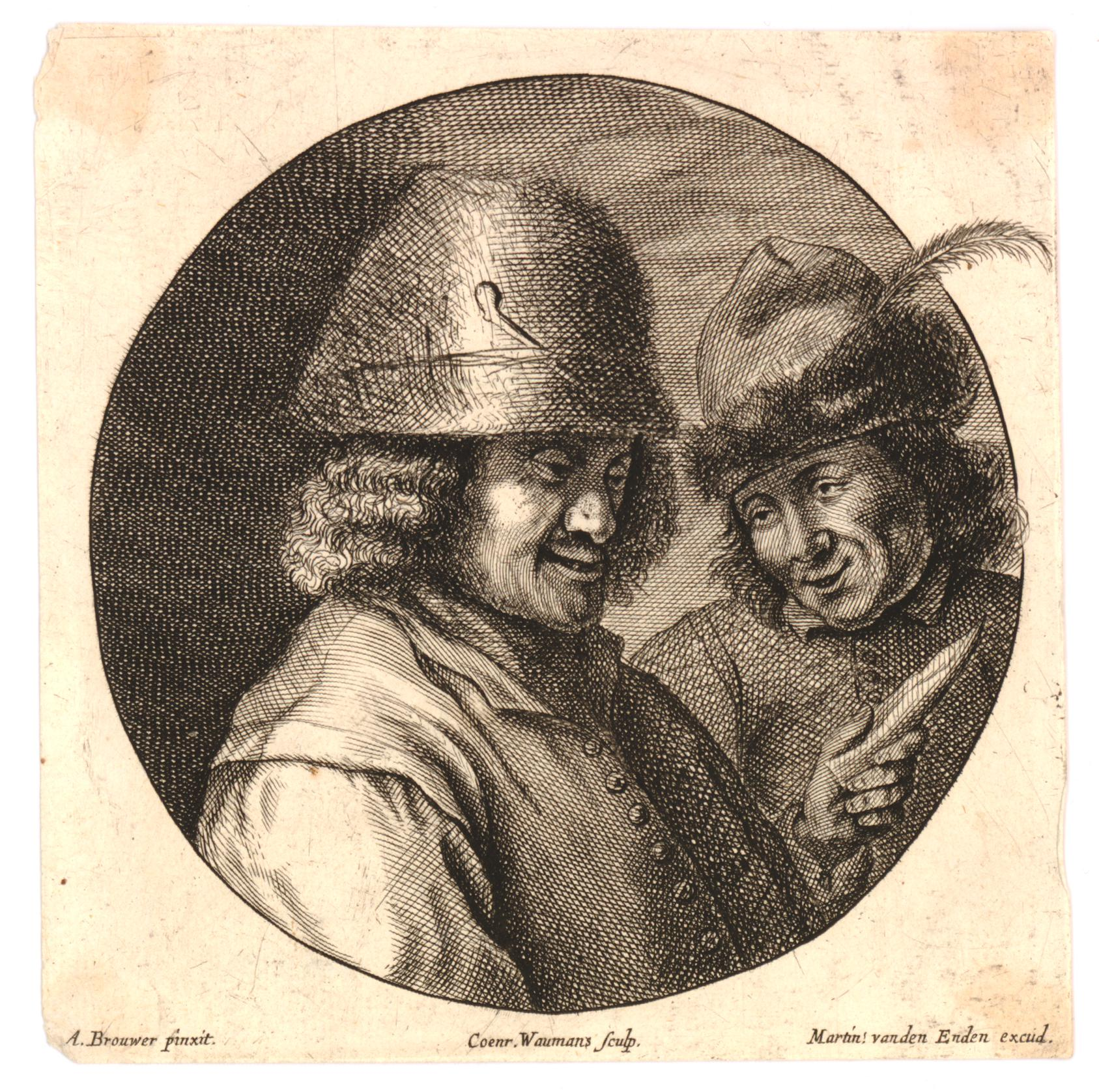
- Coenraet Waumans after Adriaen Brouwer: Two Peasants Singing, Etching and engraving, British Museum
- Born: 19 June 1619; Antwerp, Spanish Netherlands
- Died: c. 1675–1681; Antwerp, Spanish Netherlands
- Other name: Coenraad Waumans
- Education: Paulus Pontius
- Known for: Etching
- Movement: Baroque

Coenraet (or Coenraad) Waumans (Antwerp, 19 June 1619 – c. 1675–1681) was a Flemish engraver.

== Biography ==
Coenraet Waumans was born in Antwerp on 19 June 1619. He is recorded as an apprentice of Paulus Pontius in the Guild of Saint Luke, appearing in the account books from 18 September 1633 to 18 September the following year, and as a master from September 1636 to September 1637. There is no documentary evidence of him after 30 May 1661, when he signed the guild's new statutes. However, he may have been still alive in 1675, and some sources suggest he lived until 1681.

Waumans produced engravings after religious paintings by Rubens, such as The Descent from the Cross (based on the version once owned by Władysław IV Vasa, which was destroyed by fire in 1973) and The Saint Anne Teaching the Virgin to Read (modelled after a painting by Rubens now held at the Royal Museum of Fine Arts, Antwerp).

Portraits, however, constitute the largest part of his body of work. These include engravings based on paintings by Anthony van Dyck, such as his portraits of Frederick Henry of Nassau-Siegen, Amalia of Solms-Braunfels and Antonio Dávila y Zúñiga, as well as works by Joannes Meyssens (for the series Image de divers hommes d'esprit sublime, qui par leur art et science devraient vivre éternellement, Antwerp, 1649) and Lucas Franchoys the Younger, whose self-portrait – now lost – he engraved for Cornelis de Bie's Het Gulden Cabinet der Edel Vry Schilderconst.

Together with Pontius and many other engravers, he collaborated on a series of portraits based on drawings by Anselm van Hulle depicting the 120 negotiators of the Peace of Westphalia. These portraits were collected with the title Celeberrimi ad Pacificandum Christiani Nominis Orbem Legati and published in Antwerp by Daniel Middeler in 1648, the same year that the treaties of Münster and Osnabrück were signed.

Several etchings featuring large-scale busts of peasants with exaggerated features, based on drawings by Adriaen Brouwer, have also been attributed to him, as evidenced by a signature found on some of the etchings.

== Gallery ==
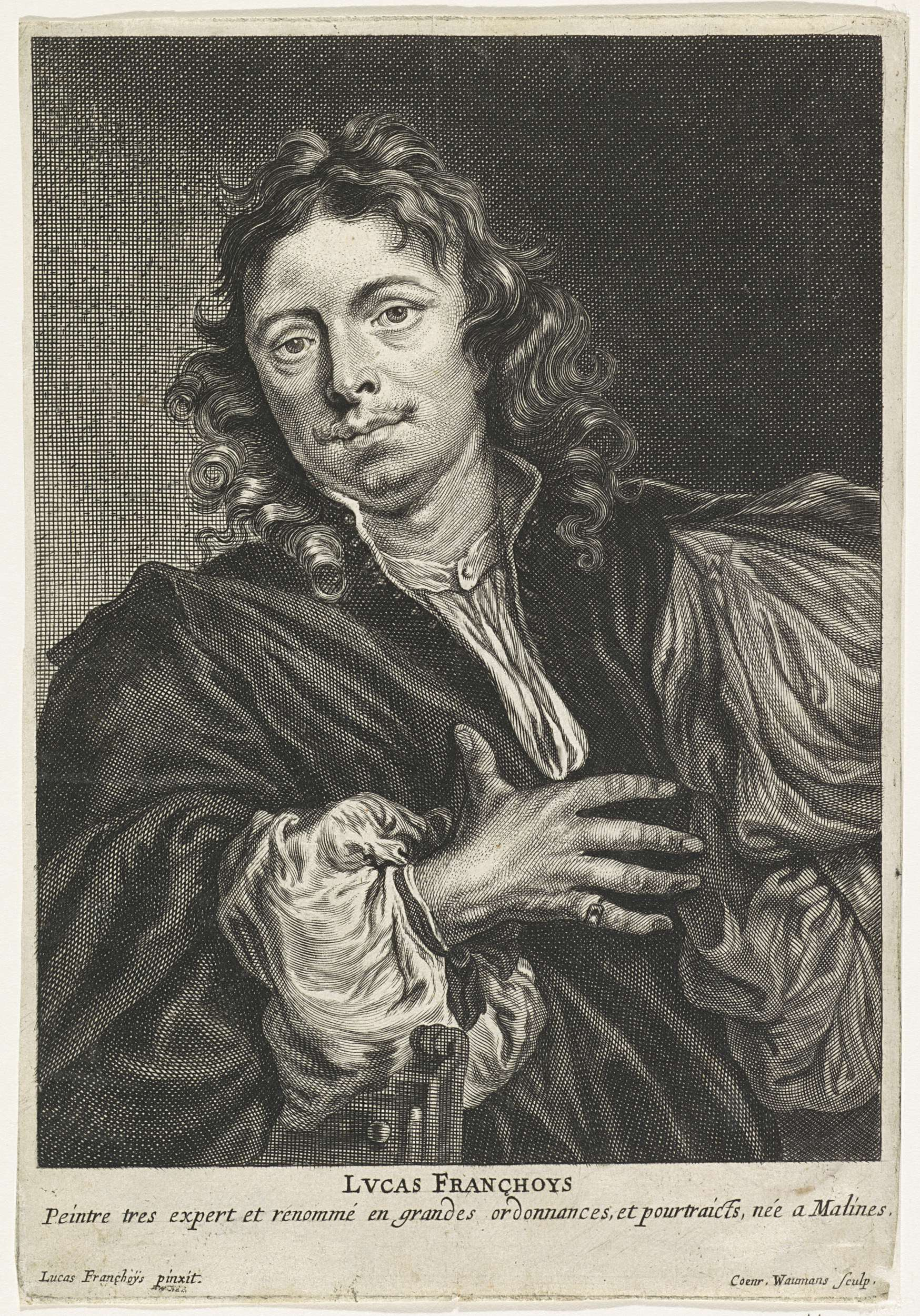
Lucas Franchoys the Younger

Otto of Louvain

Hedwig Eleonora of Holstein-Gottorp

Cornelis van Poelenburgh

Christina, Queen of Sweden
