= List of protected heritage sites in Florennes =

This table shows an overview of the protected heritage sites in the Walloon town Florennes. This list is part of Belgium's national heritage.

Object	Year/architect	Town/section	Address	Coordinates	Number^{?}	Image
Church of Saint-Gengulphe ^{(nl)} ^{(fr)}		Florennes		50.250970°N 4.603243°E	93022-CLT-0002-01 Info	Kerk Saint-Gengulphe
Ensemble of buildings, interior and exterior of the Beaufort Castle, Parc des Ducs ^{(nl)} ^{(fr)}		Florennes	Florennes	50.251289°N 4.601466°E	93022-CLT-0003-01 Info	Ensemble van de gebouwen, interieur en exterieur, van het kasteel Beaufort, parc des Ducs More images
Area of special value: Chapel of Notre-Dame des Affligés ^{(nl)} ^{(fr)}		Florennes		50.316121°N 4.543605°E	93022-CLT-0004-01 Info	
Castle Morialmé, ensemble of castle and surroundings ^{(nl)} ^{(fr)}		Florennes	n° 231	50.277173°N 4.566067°E	93022-CLT-0006-01 Info	
Chapel of Saint-Oger, and ensemble formed by the building and its surroundings ^{(nl)} ^{(fr)}		Hanzinne Florennes		50.307347°N 4.540885°E	93022-CLT-0007-01 Info	Kapel Saint-Oger, en ensemble gevormd door het gebouw en zijn omgeving
Chapel "Vieille Sainte Barbe" and ensemble formed by the immediate environment, limited to the crown of the tree ^{(nl)} ^{(fr)}		Florennes		50.272540°N 4.560903°E	93022-CLT-0009-01 Info	
Place d'Hanzinelle ^{(nl)} ^{(fr)}		Florennes		50.296148°N 4.556416°E	93022-CLT-0011-01 Info	
Salon called "salles d'armes" in Castle Morialmé ^{(nl)} ^{(fr)}		Florennes		50.277156°N 4.566335°E	93022-PEX-0001-01 Info	

== See also ==
- List of protected heritage sites in Namur (province)
