= Arnulf II of Boulogne =

Count of Boulogne from 964 to 972

Arnulf II
- Count of Boulogne
- Reign: 964–after 31 January 972
- Predecessor: Arnulf I (as Count of Flanders and Boulogne)
- Successor: Arnulf III, Count of Boulogne
- Born: Unknown
- Died: after 31 January 972
- Spouse: Unknown
- Issue: Arnulf III, Count of Boulogne
- Father: Adelolf, Count of Boulogne
- Mother: Unknown

Arnulf II of Boulogne (died 972) was Count of Boulogne from 964 to 972. He was the son of Count Adelolf of Boulogne. He succeeded as count in 964 after the death of his uncle Arnulf I, Count of Flanders, who was also Count of County of Flanders, and held it until his own death. He is the father of Arnulf III, Count of Boulogne, who succeeded him as Count of Boulogne.

== See also ==
- House of Flanders
- Counts of Boulogne

Arnulf II of Boulogne House of Boulogne Born: unknown Died: 972
Preceded by Arnulf I	Count of Boulogne; 964–972	Succeeded by Arnulf III
