= Florennes =

Municipality in Wallonia

Florennes: Florene (Walloon)
- Municipality
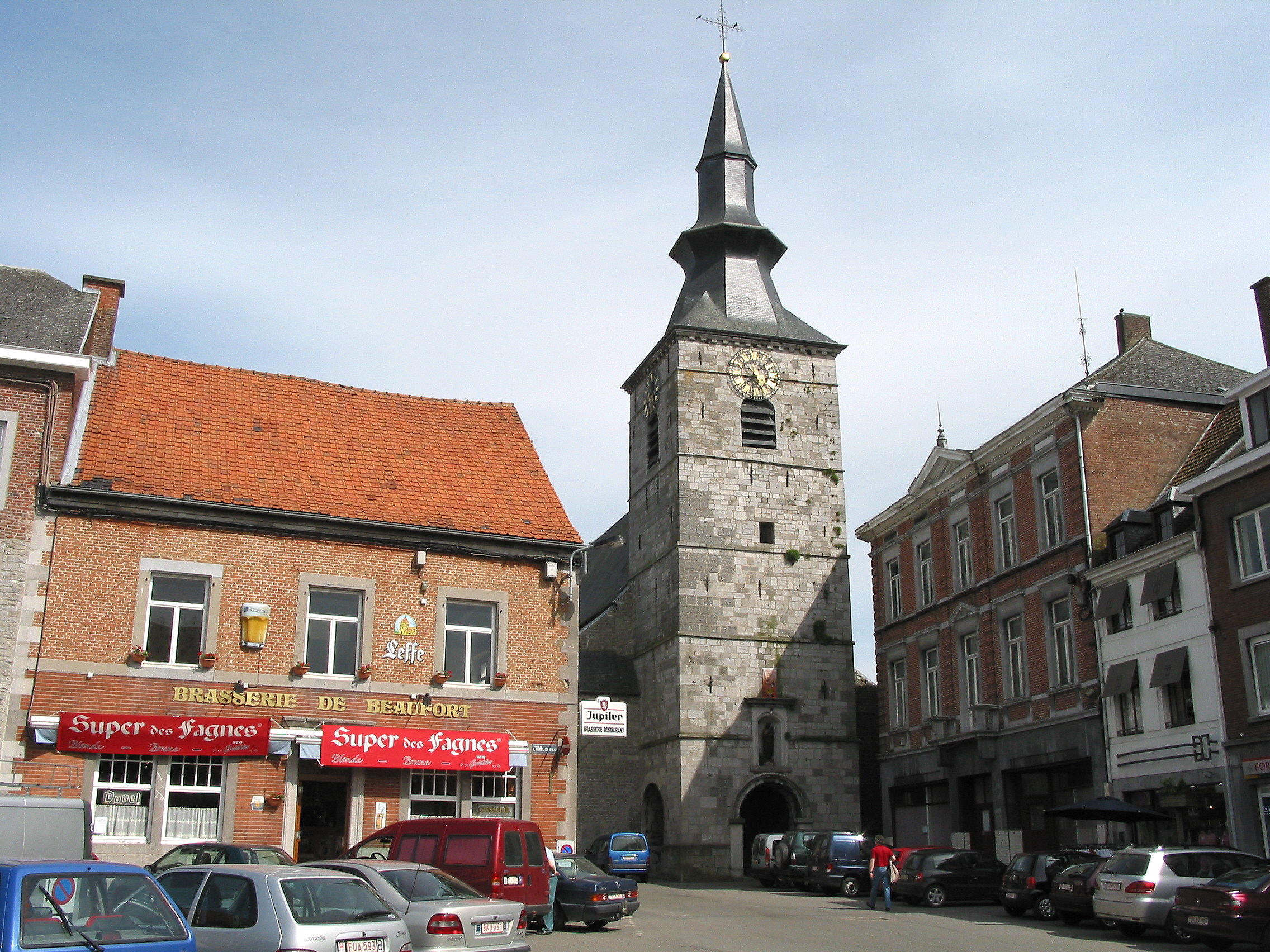

- Flag Coat of arms

- Location of Florennes in the province of Namur
- Interactive map of Florennes
- Location in Belgium
- Coordinates: 50°15′N 04°37′E
- Country: Belgium
- Community: French Community
- Region: Wallonia
- Province: Namur
- Arrondissement: Philippeville

Government
  - Mayor: Stéphane Lasseaux
  - Governing party: Contact 21 - Ad 11

Area
  - Total: 134.18 km^{2} (51.81 sq mi)

Population (2018-01-01)
  - Total: 11,410
  - Density: 85.04/km^{2} (220.2/sq mi)
- Postal codes: 5620-5621
- NIS code: 93022
- Area codes: 071
- Website: www.florennes.be

Florennes (French pronunciation: [flɔ.ʁɛn]; Walloon: Florene) is a municipality of Wallonia located in the province of Namur, Belgium. As of 1 January 2006, Florennes has a total population of 10,754. The total area is 133.55 km^{2} which gives a population density of 81 inhabitants per km^{2}.

The municipality consists of the following districts: Corenne, Flavion, Florennes, Hanzinelle, Hanzinne, Hemptinne, Morialmé, Morville, Rosée, Saint-Aubin and Thy-le-Bauduin.

Florennes hosts Florennes Air Base, a Belgian military airfield which is the home base for F-16 Fighting Falcon jets.

The first week-end of every July, Florennes is a large festival due to the folk walk with a couple of thousand walkers.

Cyclists Firmin Lambot, who won the Tour de France in 1919 and in 1922 and Léon Scieur, who won the Tour in 1921, were born in Florennes.

The village was formerly the site of Florennes Abbey, dissolved during the French Revolution and since entirely demolished.

== See also ==
- List of protected heritage sites in Florennes

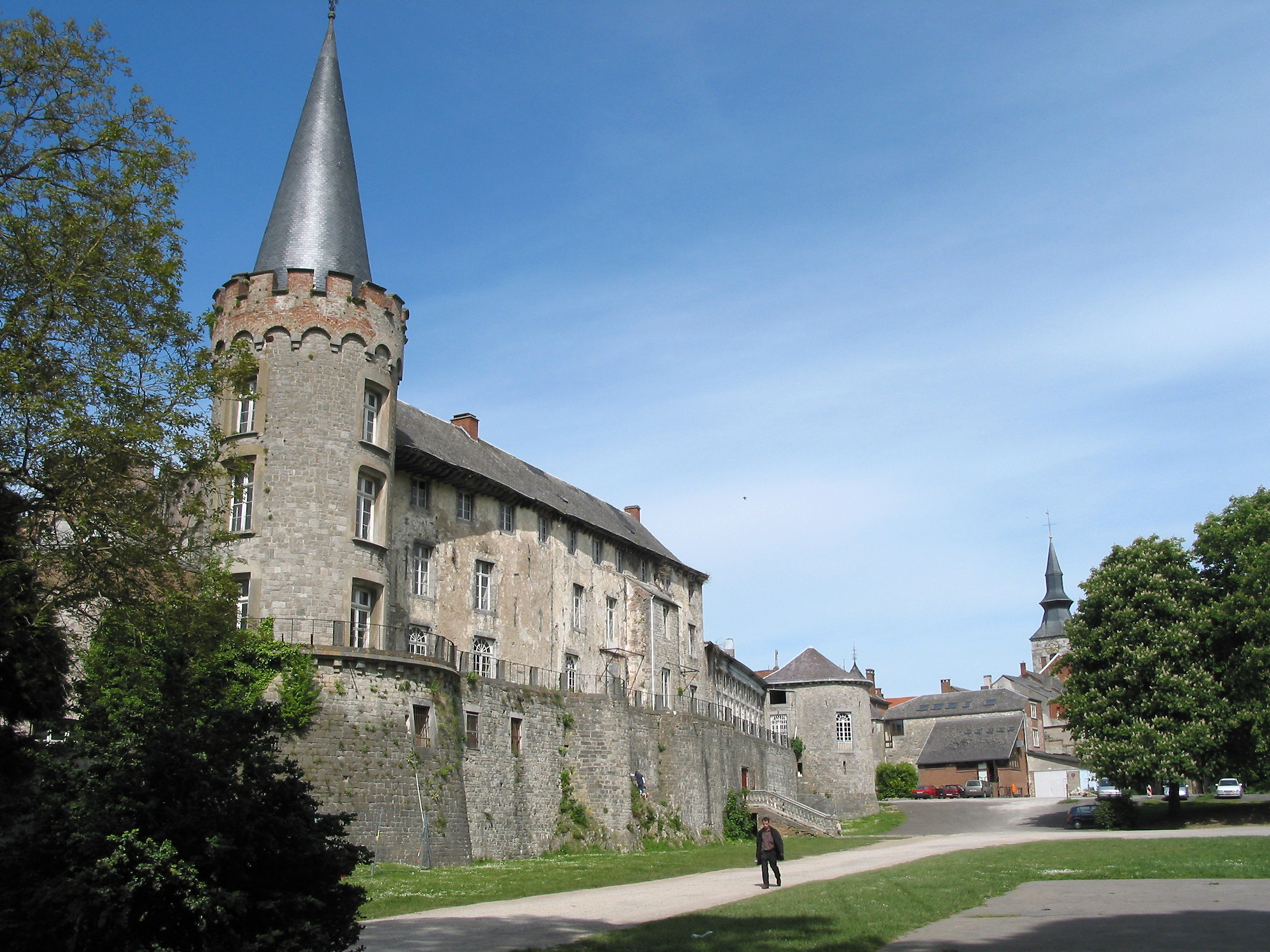
Florennes Castle
