= Gerberga of Lower Lorraine =

Countess consort of Louvain (975–1019)

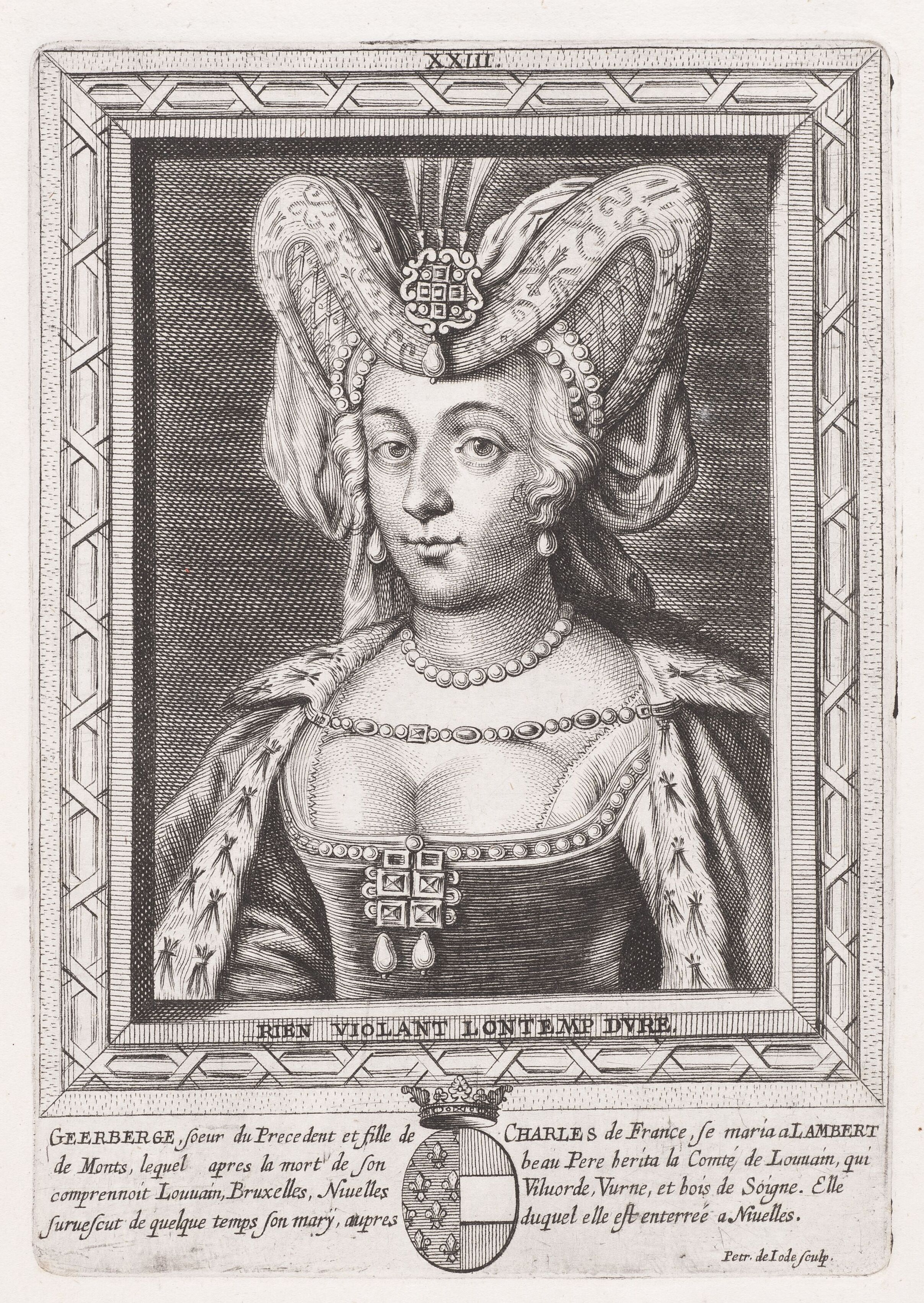
- Gerberga
- Born: c. 975
- Died: c. 1019
- Noble family: Carolingian
- Spouse: Lambert I, Count of Louvain
- Issue: Henry I, Count of Louvain; Lambert II, Count of Louvain; Matilda of Louvain; Reginar
- Father: Charles, Duke of Lower Lorraine
- Mother: Adelaide/Agnes de Vermandois

Gerberga of Lower Lorraine (975-1019), Countess of Louvain, was the daughter of Charles, Duke of Lower Lorraine, himself the son of Louis IV of France and Gerberga of Saxony. Her mother was Adelaide/Agnes de Vermandois.

== Personal life ==
She married Lambert I, Count of Louvain and they had:

- Henry I
- Lambert II
- Matilda (also called Maud), who married Eustace I, Count of Boulogne
- Reginar

== Sources ==
- Bouchard, Constance Brittain (2001). Those of My Blood: Creating Noble Families in Medieval Francia. University of Pennsylvania Press.
- Tanner, Heather J. (1992). Chibnall, Marjorie (ed.). "The Expansion of the Power and Influence of the Counts of Boulogne under Eustace II". Anglo-Norman Studies - XIV.Proceeding of the Battle Conference 1991. The Boydell Press: 251-286.
