= Eustace I of Boulogne =

Count of Boulogne from 1024 to 1047

Eustace I, Count of Boulogne
- Died: 1047
- Noble family: House of Flanders; House of Boulogne (founder)
- Spouse: Matilda of Louvain
- Issue: Eustace II of Boulogne; Godfrey, Bishop of Paris; Lambert II, Count of Lens; Gerberga
- Father: Baldwin II, Count of Boulogne
- Mother: Adelina of Holland

Eustace I, Count of Boulogne, was a nobleman and founder of the Boulogne branch of the House of Flanders. He held the county of Boulogne from 1024 until his death in 1047.

== Life ==
Eustace was the elder son of Count Baldwin II of Boulogne and Adelina of Holland. He succeeded his father as count of Boulogne in 1024. Eustace was also the count of Lens. In 1028 Eustace confirmed the foundation of a college of canons in his castle at Lens and despite accounts of Lens passing to Baldwin V of Flanders circa 1036 it was still held by Eustace and was passed to his son Lambert at his death.

During the minority of Baldwin IV, Count of Flanders, Eustace's grandfather, Arnulf III, Count of Boulogne had broken free of Flanders and operated as an independent prince, as did Eustace's father and Eustace himself. In 995, having attained his majority, Baldwin IV attempted to recover several of the independently held castles and to expand the Flemish borders. This had caused considerable animosity between Baldwin IV, Count of Flanders and Eustace's father, but when Baldwin IV's son Baldwin V succeeded him in 1035 Eustace and Baldwin V of Flanders cooperated on several ventures including several charters and in limiting the powers of the Castellan-advocates of several abbeys including the Abbey of Saint Bertin in Flanders.

Eustace was allied to the ducal house of Normandy by the marriage of his son Eustace II to Goda, niece of Richard II. This had far reaching alliances to other branches of these families including that of Edward the Confessor, King of England. Under Eustace the counts of Boulogne rose to great prominence in Northern France. Eustace I died in 1047.

Eustace was apparently a patron of Samer Abbey near Calais and he is said to have been buried there.

== Family and children ==
Eustace married Matilda of Louvain, (Note: Matilda was a direct descendant of Charlemagne and in terms of rank descendants of Charlemagne were among the most prestigious brides. Noble families of the eleventh and twelfth centuries sought to trace their descent specifically into the Carolingian line.) daughter of Lambert I of Louvain and Gerberga of Lower Lorraine and had:

- Eustace II of Boulogne.
- Godfrey, Bishop of Paris from 1061 to 1095
- Lambert II, Count of Lens.
- Gerberga, married Frederick, Duke of Lower Lorraine

== Sources ==
- Andressohn, John Carl (1947). The Ancestry and Life of Godfrey of Bouillon. Indiana University Press.
- Bridgeford, Andrew (2009). 1066: The Hidden History in the Bayeux Tapestry. Bloomsbury. p. xiii.
- Green, Judith A. (1997). The Aristocracy of Norman England. The Cambridge University Press.
- Leyser, Conrad; Smith, Lesley, eds. (2011). Motherhood, Religion, and Society in Medieval Europe, 400 - 1400. Ashgate.
- Tanner, Heather J. (1992). Chibnall, Marjorie (ed.). "The Expansion of the Power and Influence of the Counts of Boulogne under Eustace II". Anglo-Norman Studies - XIV.Proceeding of the Battle Conference 1991. The Boydell Press: 251-286.
- Tanner, Heather J. (2004). Family, Friends and Allies; Boulogne and Politics in Northern France and England c. 879-1160. Brill.

Eustace I of Boulogne House of Boulogne Born: unknown Died: 1047
Preceded by Baldwin II	Count of Boulogne; 1024–1047	Succeeded by Eustace II
