= Lutgardis of Luxembourg =

Countess consort of Holland

- Born: c. 955
- Died: c. 1005 or possibly later
- Noble family: House of Ardenne–Luxembourg
- Spouse: Arnulf, Count of Holland
- Issue: Dirk III; Siegfried of Holland; Adelina of Holland
- Father: Siegfried of Luxembourg
- Mother: Hedwig of Nordgau

Lutgardis of Luxembourg, also known as Liutgardis, Liutgarde and Lutgard, (c. 955 – ca. 1005 or possibly later) was a countess consort of Holland by marriage to Arnulf, Count of Holland. She was the regent of Holland from 993 until 1005 during the minority of her son Dirk III of Holland.

== Life ==
She was a daughter of Siegfried of Luxembourg and Hedwig of Nordgau. Her sister was Cunigunde of Luxembourg. She married Arnulf, Count of Holland.

On the death of her spouse in 993, she became regent of Holland during the minority of her son, Dirk III. She maintained control of the county with the support of her former brother-in-law, Emperor Henry II. On 20 September 993, Liutgard donated her properties at Rugge to Saint Peter's abbey of Ghent for the soul of her husband. According to Thietmar's Chronicle, possibly in June 1005, she made peace with the West-Frisians through mediation by Emperor Henry. Her son was declared mature in 1005, thus ending her mandate as regent.

The date of Lutgardis' death is not clear in view of conflicting sources including Annales Egmundani. It may well have been in 1005 or even later. She was buried in Egmont.

== Issue ==
- Dirk III of Holland, for whom she acted as regent from 993 to 1005
- Siegfried of Holland (985–1030), married Thetburga (985–)
- Adelina of Holland
