= Arnulf III of Boulogne =

Count of Boulogne from 972 to 990

Arnulf III

Count of Boulogne
- Reign: 972-990
- Predecessor: Arnulf II, Count of Boulogne
- Successor: Baldwin II, Count of Boulogne
- Died: c. 990
- Noble family: House of Flanders
- Issue: Baldwin II, Count of Boulogne
- Father: Arnulf II, Count of Boulogne

Arnulf III of Boulogne (died 990) was a son of Arnulf II, Count of Boulogne. He succeeded his father as Count of Boulogne from 972 to 990. On his death some genealogical reconstructions suggest his lands were divided among his three sons as follows:

- Baldwin received Boulogne
- Arnulf (alleged son) received Ternois likely centered on Saint-Pol-sur-Ternoise
- An unnamed son (unconfirmed) received Thérouanne

These claims are not confirmed by contemporary sources.

Arnulf III of Boulogne House of Boulogne Born: unknown Died: 990
Preceded by Arnulf II	Count of Boulogne; 972–990	Succeeded by Baldwin II

== Background ==
Arnulf III was a member of the House of Flanders through his father Arnulf II, Count of Boulogne, who had governed Boulogne after the death of his uncle Arnulf I of Flanders. While his birth date is unknown, Arnulf III’s succession in 972 indicates he was likely of age and politically recognized as heir to the Boulognese line.

== Historical context ==
The county of Boulogne in the 10th century was part of the broader political sphere of Flanders, and although few records survive from Arnulf III's reign, he likely continued the process of consolidating control in a region that had fluctuated between local independence and Flemish comital oversight.

== Legacy ==
Though little is known of his actions as count, Arnulf III maintained comital continuity at a time when succession disputes were common in neighboring regions. The division of lands among his sons, recorded in genealogical tradition, suggests a pragmatic approach to dynastic inheritance and possibly a strategy to maintain peace within his lineage.

== See also ==
- House of Flanders
- Counts of Boulogne

== Sources ==
- Nicholas, David (1992). Medieval Flanders. Longman.
- Vanderkindere, Léon (1902). La formation territoriale des principautés belges au Moyen Âge (in French). Vol. 2. Brussels: H. Lamertin.
