= Charles, Duke of Lower Lorraine =

Duke of Lower Lorraine and rival king of West Francia

Charles (IV)
- Denier minted by Charles as king during his second revolt, minted in Laon

King of West Francia
- Reign: late 978 – 980 (against Lothair)
- Coronation: october 978 in Laon
- Predecessor: Lothair
- Successor: Lothair
- Reign: 987 – 991 (against Hugh Capet)
- Predecessor: Hugh Capet
- Successor: Hugh Capet

Duke of Lower Lorraine
- Reign: 977 – c. 991
- Predecessor: Richer
- Successor: Otto
- Born: c. 953; Laon
- Died: after 992; Orléans
- Spouse: Adelaide of Troyes
- Issue: Otto, Duke of Lower Lorraine; Ermengarde; Gerberga of Lower Lorraine; Louis of Lower Lorraine; Charles
- House: Carolingian
- Father: Louis IV of France
- Mother: Gerberga of Saxony

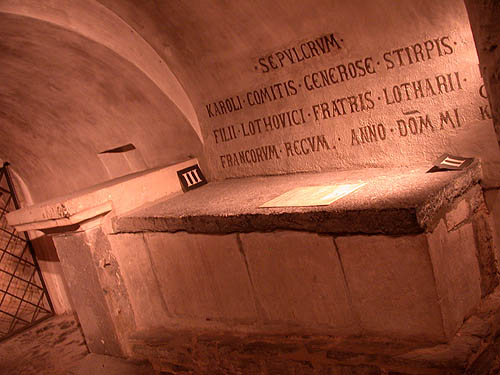
Tomb of Charles in the Basilica of Saint Servatius in Maastricht

Charles (c. 953 – 22 June 992/995) was duke of Lower Lorraine from 977 until his death but also twice anti-king of the kingdom of West Francia.

He was elected twice as rival king of West Francia, the first time against his brother Lothair with help of Otto the Great and the second against Hugh Capet. The last attempt led to his capture and death in prison at an unknown date, he was among the last legitimate male heirs of the Carolingians.

== Life ==
Born at Reims in the summer of 953, Charles was the son of Louis IV of France and Gerberga of Saxony and the younger brother of King Lothair. He was a sixth-generation descendant of Charlemagne. When his father was captured by the Normans and held, both his sons were demanded as ransom for his release. Queen Gerberga would only send Charles, who was then handed over and his father was released into the custody of Hugh Capet.

In or before 976, he accused Lothair's wife, Emma, daughter of Lothair II of Italy, of infidelity with Adalberon, Bishop of Laon. The council of Sainte-Macre at Fismes (near Reims) exonerated the queen and the bishop, but Charles maintained his claim and was driven from the kingdom, finding refuge at the court of his cousin, the emperor Otto II. Otto promised to crown Charles as soon as Lothair was out of the way and Charles paid him homage, receiving back Lower Lorraine.

In August 978, Lothair invaded Germany and captured the imperial capital of Aachen, but failed to capture either Otto or Charles. In October, Otto and Charles in turn invaded France, devastating the land around Reims, Soissons and Laon. In the latter city, the chief seat of the kings of France, Charles was crowned by Theodoric I, Bishop of Metz. Lothair fled to Paris and was besieged there but a relief army of Hugh Capet forced Otto and Charles to lift the siege on 30 November. Lothair and Capet, the tables turned once more, chased the German king and Charles back to Aachen and retook Laon.

Around 979, Charles transferred the relics of Saint Gudula from Moorsel to the Saint Gaugericus chapel on Saint-Géry Island near Brussels. This is generally accepted as the time when the city was founded. Charles would construct the first permanent fortification in the city, doing so on that same island.

As he had been a vassal also of Lothair, Charles' acts on behalf of Otto were considered treason and he was thereafter excluded from the throne. On Lothair's death (986), the magnates elected his son Louis V and on the latter's death (987), Hugh Capet. Thus, the House of Capet came to the throne over the disgraced and ignored Charles. Charles' unexceptional marriage and his lack of wealth are two of the reasons he was denied the throne. Charles made war on Hugh, even taking Rheims and Laon. However, on Maundy Thursday (26 March) 991, he was captured, through the perfidy of the Bishop Adalberon, and was imprisoned by Hugh in Orléans. He was succeeded as Duke of Lower Lorraine by his son Otto.

There is uncertainty over the date and place of Charles' death. The necrology of the diocese of Liège dates Charles' death to 22 June without specifying the year. Sigebert of Gembloux records it under the year 991, but he may have confused it with his capture, since two documents of January 992 seem to imply that Charles was still alive. One was dated by a supporter to the fifth year of "Charles king in waiting" (sperante Karolo rege); the other is dated by Hugh's reign, "Charles being thrown in prison" (Karolo trusus in carcere). He must have been dead by 995, when Adalberon and Count Odo of Blois tried to install his son Louis on the throne. His death is sometimes placed in Orléans, but this is pure conjecture.

The Historia Francorum Senonensis, written between 1015 and 1034, propagated the view that Charles was the rightful king in 987 and Hugh a usurper. In 1666, the lead sarcophagus of Charles was discovered in the Basilica of Saint Servatius in Maastricht with an inscription bearing the date 1001. This appears to be the date of his interment in Maastricht, however, and not of his death. Probably his son Otto had his body moved. While the sarcophagus remains, the original inscription has been lost.

== Family ==
In 970, Charles married Adelaide of Troyes. Together he and Adelaide had:

- Otto, succeeded as Duke of Lower Lotharingia
- Ermengarde, who married Albert I, Count of Namur
- Gerberga of Lower Lorraine (b. 975–1018), who married Lambert I, Count of Louvain
- Louis (c. 989 – 1023)
- Charles (b. 989)

== Sources ==
- Bouchard, Constance Brittain (2001). Those of My Blood: Creating Noble Families in Medieval Francia. University of Pennsylvania Press.
- Brooke, Christopher (2014). Europe in the Central Middle Ages: 962-1154. Routledge.
- Tanner, Heather J. (1992). Chibnall, Marjorie (ed.). "The Expansion of the Power and Influence of the Counts of Boulogne under Eustace II". Anglo-Norman Studies - XIV.Proceeding of the Battle Conference 1991. The Boydell Press: 251-286.
- Tanner, Heather J. (2004). Family, Friends and Allies; Boulogne and Politics in Northern France and England c. 879-1160. Brill.

Charles, Duke of Lower Lorraine Carolingian Born: 953 Died: 993
Preceded by Richar	Duke of Lower Lorraine; 977–993	Succeeded by Otto
