= Duchess of Brabant (by marriage) =

The Coat of arms of the Duchess of Brabant.

The Duchess of Brabant refers to a woman married to the Duke of Brabant. But this was only in 1840 when it was revived as an honorific title for the Crown Prince of the newly created Kingdom of Belgium. There have been only three royal duchesses.

Historically the title went back 657 years before Belgium, and had been always associated with the wives of sovereign Dukes of Brabant, who were alive in their husband's reign. In the Duchy's 611 years of existence, it only saw three Duchesses who reigned by their own right and three Dukes who rule by the virtue of their wives: Joanna, Mary the Rich, Mary II; and their husbands Wenceslaus of Luxemburg, Maximilian of Austria, Francis of Lorraine. All these Dukes were reigning monarchs and not consorts. Also there were the two Co-sovereign of the Spanish Netherlands Isabella and Albert.

Before the elevation to a Duchy, Brabant was a Landgraviate of the Holy Roman Empire. After the death on 20 September 1085 of Hermann II, count palatine of Lotharingia, Henry III of Leuven became landgrave of Brabant, which was an imperial fief between the Dender and the Zenne and his wife, Getrude of Flanders, became Landgravine. Elevated to a Duchy by Frederick Barbarossa in favor of Henry I. In 1190, after the death of Godfrey III, Henry I also became Duke of Lotharingia. Formerly Lower Lotharingia, this title was now practically without territorial authority, but was borne by the later Dukes of Brabant as an honorific title. In 1288, the Duchess of Brabant became also Duchess of Limburg. The title fell to the Duchess of Burgundy in 1430. Later on, it followed with the Burgundian inheritance through the Habsburg dynasty until 1794. After the 15th century the title became one of the many appanages associated with the Queen consorts of Spain and later the Holy Roman Empresses. Queen Sofía of Spain and also the late Crown Princess Regina of Austria also has claims to the title.

== Landgravine of Brabant ==
Picture	Name	Father	Birth	Marriage	Became Landgravine	Cease to be Landgravine	Death	Spouse
	Gertrude of Flanders	Robert I, Count of Flanders (Flanders)	1080	–	20 September 1085 husband's ascension	July 1095 husband's death	1117	Henry III of Leuven
	Ida of Chiny	Otto II, Count of Chiny (Chiny)	1078	1105		1117		Godfrey I of Leuven
	Clementia of Burgundy	William I, Count of Burgundy (Ivrea)	1078	1125		1133		Godfrey I of Leuven
	Luitgarde of Sulzbach	Berengar I, Count of Sulzbach (Babenberg)	1109	1139		13 June 1142 husband's death	after 1163	Godfrey II of Leuven
	Margaret of Limburg	Henry II, Duke of Limburg (Ardennes)	1135	1155/8		1172		Godfrey III of Leuven
	Imagina of Loon	Louis I, Count of Loon (Loon)	–	1180		21 August 1190 husband's death	5 June 1214	Godfrey III of Leuven

== Duchess of Brabant ==
=== House of Leuven, 1183–1406 ===
Picture	Name	House	Birth	Marriage	Became Duchess	Cease to be Duchess	Death	Spouse
	Mathilde of Flanders	Matthew, Count of Boulogne (Metz)	1170	1180	1183/1184 husband's elevated to Duke	16 October 1210		Henry I
	Marie of France	Philip II of France (Capet)	after 1198	22 April 1213		15 October 1224		Henry I
	Sophie of Thuringia	Louis IV, Landgrave of Thuringia (Ludowinger)	20 March 1224	1240		1 February 1248 husband's death	29 May 1275	Henry II
	Adelaide of Burgundy	Hugh IV, Duke of Burgundy (Burgundy)	1233	1251, after 21 July		28 February 1261 husband's death	23 October 1273	Henry III
	Margaret of France	Louis IX of France (Capet)	1254	5 September 1270		July 1271		John I
	Margaret of Flanders	Guy of Dampierre, Count of Flanders (Dampierre)	1251	1273		3 July 1285		John I
	Margaret of England	Edward I of England (Plantagenet)	15 March 1275	8 July 1290	3 May 1294 husband's ascession	27 October 1312 husband's death	after 11 March 1333	John II
	Marie d'Évreux	Louis of France, Count d'Évreux (Évreux)	1303	19 July 1311	27 October 1312 husband's ascession	31 October 1335		John III

=== House of Valois, 1406–1482 ===
Picture	Name	Father	Birth	Marriage	Became Duchess	Cease to be Duchess	Death	Spouse
	Jeanne of Saint Pol	Waleran III of Luxembourg, Count of Ligny and Saint Pol (Luxembourg)	1380/85	21 February 1402	1 November 1406 husband's ascession	12 August 1407		Anthony
	Elisabeth, Duchess of Luxembourg	John of Görlitz (Luxembourg)	November 1390	16 July 1409		25 October 1415 husband's death	3 August 1451	Anthony
	Jacqueline, Countess of Hainaut	William II, Duke of Bavaria (Wittelsbach)	16 August 1401	18 April 1418		7 March 1422 obtained papal divorce	8 October 1436	John IV
–	Margaret	?	?	?	17 April 1427 husband's accession	14 August 1430 husband's death	?	Philip I
	Isabella of Portugal	John I of Portugal (Aviz)	21 February 1397	7 January 1430		15 July 1467 husband's death	17 December 1471	Philip II
	Margaret of York	Richard Plantagenet, 3rd Duke of York (York)	3 May 1446	9 July 1468		5 January 1477 husband's death	23 November 1503	Charles I

=== House of Habsburg, 1482–1700 ===
Picture	Name	House	Birth	Marriage	Became Duchess	Cease to be Duchess	Death	Spouse
	Joanna of Castile	Ferdinand II of Aragon (Trastamara)	6 November 1479	20 October 1496		25 September 1506 husband's death	12 April 1555	Philip III
	Isabella of Portugal	Manuel I of Portugal (Aviz)	24 October 1503	11 March 1526		1 May 1539		Charles II
	Mary I of England	Henry VIII of England (Tudor)	18 February 1516	25 July 1554	16 January 1556 husband's ascension	17 November 1558		Philip IV
	Elisabeth of Valois	Henry II of France (Valois)	2 April 1545	22 June 1559		3 October 1568		Philip IV
	Anna of Austria	Maximilian II, Holy Roman Emperor (Habsburg)	1 November 1549	4 May 1570		26 October 1580		Philip IV
	Elisabeth of Bourbon	Henry IV of France (Bourbon)	22 November 1602	25 November 1615	31 March 1621 husband's ascension	6 October 1644		Philip V
	Mariana of Austria	Ferdinand III, Holy Roman Emperor (Habsburg)	24 December 1634	25 November 1615		17 September 1665 husband's death	16 May 1696	Philip V
	Marie Louise of Orléans	Philippe I, Duke of Orléans (Bourbon-Orléans)	26 March 1662	19 November 1679		12 February 1689		Charles III
	Maria Anna of the Palatinate-Neuburg	Philip William, Elector Palatine (Wittelsbach)	28 October 1667	14 May 1690		1 November 1700 husband's death	16 July 1740	Charles III

=== House of Bourbon, 1700–1706 ===
Picture	Name	Father	Born	Married	Became Duchess	Ceased to be Duchess	Death	Spouse
	Maria Luisa of Savoy	Victor Amadeus II of Sardinia (Savoy)	17 September 1688	2 November 1701		c. 1706; Duchy ceded to Austria	14 February 1714	Philip VI

=== House of Habsburg, 1706–1780 ===
Picture	Name	Father	Born	Married	Became Duchess	Ceased to be Duchess	Died	Spouse
	Elisabeth Christine of Brunswick-Wolfenbüttel	Louis Rudolph, Duke of Brunswick-Lüneburg (Welf)	28 August 1691	1 August 1708		20 October 1740 husband's death	21 December 1750	Charles IV

=== House of Habsburg-Lorraine, 1780–1794 ===
Picture	Name	Father	Born	Married	Became Duchess	Ceased to be Duchess	Death	Spouse
	Maria Luisa of Spain	Charles III of Spain (Bourbon)	24 November 1745	5 August 1765	20 February 1790 husband's ascession	1 March 1792 husband's death	15 May 1792	Leopold
	Maria Theresa of Naples and Sicily	Ferdinand I of the Two Sicilies (Bourbon-Two Sicilies)	6 June 1772	15 September 1790	1 March 1792 husband's ascession	1794	13 April 1807	Francis

== Royal Duchesses of Brabant ==
Picture	Name	House	Birth	Marriage	Became Duchess	Cease to be Duchess	Death	Spouse
	Archduchess Marie Henriette of Austria	Archduke Joseph, Palatine of Hungary (Habsburg-Lorraine)	23 August 1836	22 August 1853		10 December 1865 became queen	19 September 1902	Prince Leopold Louis
	Princess Astrid of Sweden	Prince Carl, Duke of Västergötland (Bernadotte)	17 November 1905	4 November 1926		17 February 1934 became queen	29 August 1935	Prince Leopold Philippe
	Jonkvrouw Mathilde d'Udekem d'Acoz	Count Patrick d'Udekem d'Acoz (d'Udekem d'Acoz)	20 January 1973	4 December 1999		21 July 2013 became queen	–	Prince Philippe Leopold

== See also ==
- List of Belgian consorts
- Duchess of Limburg
- List of Lotharingian consorts
- List of Burgundian consorts
- List of consorts of Luxembourg
- Countess of Flanders
- Countess of Holland
