= Margaret of France, Duchess of Brabant =

Duchess consort of Brabant from 1270 to 1271

Margaret of France
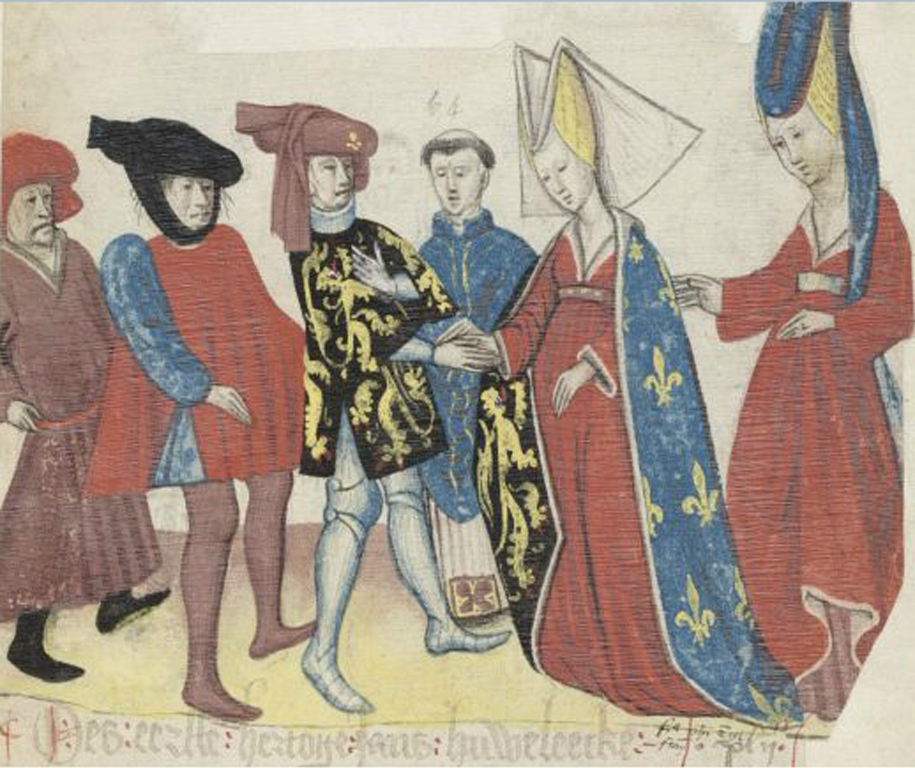
- Margaret marries John

Duchess consort of Brabant
- Tenure: 5 September 1270 – 1271
- Born: 1254
- Died: 1271 (aged 16 or 17)
- Spouse: John I, Duke of Brabant (m. 1270)
- House: Capet
- Father: Louis IX of France
- Mother: Margaret of Provence

Margaret of France (1254–1271) was a member of the House of Capet and was Duchess of Brabant by her marriage to John I, Duke of Brabant.

== Biography ==
Born in 1254, Margaret was a daughter of Louis IX of France and his wife Margaret of Provence. Margaret was originally in 1257 betrothed to Henry IV, Duke of Brabant, son of Henry III, Duke of Brabant and Alice of Burgundy. Henry was deposed in 1267. Henry's brother, John I, Duke of Brabant married Margaret on 5 September 1270.

Margaret became pregnant in 1270/1271, giving birth to a son in 1271. Neither survived, with both dying shortly after the birth.

== Sources ==
- Pippenger, Randall Todd (2022). Tales of a Minstrel of Reims in the Thirteenth Century. Translated by Rosenberg, Samuel N. Catholic University of America Press.
- Richard, Jean (1983). Lloyd, Simon (ed.). Saint Louis: Crusader King of France. Translated by Birrell, Jean. Cambridge University Press.
