= Godfrey of Brabant =

Belgian noble

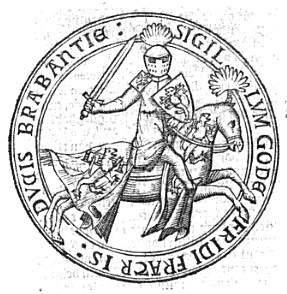

Godfrey of Brabant (died 11 July 1302 in Kortrijk), was Lord of Aarschot, between 1284 and his death in 1302, and Lord of Vierzon, between 1277 and 1302.

== Biography ==
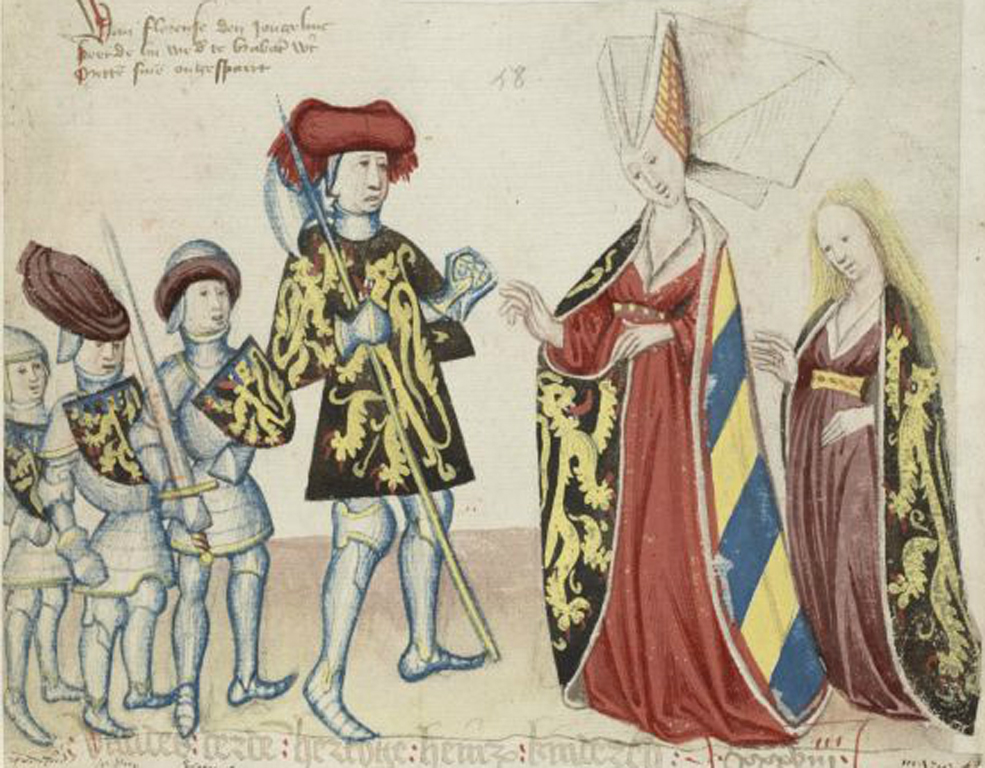
Henry III, wife and children

Godfrey was the third son of Henry III, Duke of Brabant and Adelaide of Burgundy, Duchess of Brabant. He was an able warrior and politician and supported his elder brother John I, Duke of Brabant in all his undertakings. He fought alongside his brother in the Battle of Worringen in 1288, where he captured Reginald I, Count of Guelders.

On 29 October 1284, his father appointed him Lord of Aarschot. This restored a dynasty that had been broken in 1172, when Godfried III, Count of Aarschot sold his county (and with it his heritage) to his great-grandfather Godfrey III, Count of Louvain. The transaction was made for an unknown sum and for reasons that remain unclear. Godfrey of Brabant later granted land to the inhabitants of Aarschot for the construction of new city fortifications.

In 1292, he negotiated a peace between France and the Count of Flanders. After the death of his brother, he supported his nephew John II of Brabant against all internal and external opposition.

In 1302, when Flanders revolted against King Philip IV of France, Godfrey and his only son joined the army of his French ally in the Battle of the Golden Spurs. Both were killed, as were many more knights of Brabant. His estates were divided among his four married daughters.

== Marriage and children ==
He married in 1277 Jeanne Isabeau dame de Vierzon (died 1296), daughter of Hervé IV, Lord of Vierzon, and Jeanne de Brenne. They had 1 son and 6 daughters:

- Jean (1281–1302), killed in the Battle of the Golden Spurs.
- Marie (died 1332), married to Walram, Count of Jülich (died 1297), and then to Robert of Beaumont.
- Elisabeth (died 1350), married to Gerhard V of Jülich (died 1328).
- Alix (died 1315), married in 1302 to John III of Harcourt (died 1329).
- Blanche (died 1329), married to Jean Berthout, Lord of Mechelen (died 1304), and in 1307 to John I of Thouars (died 1332).
- Marguerite, nun at Longchamps, Paris, died after 1318
- Jeanne, nun at Longchamps, Paris, died after 1318

== Ancestry ==
Ancestors of Godfrey of Brabant

16. Godfrey III, Count of Leuven
8. Henry I, Duke of Brabant
17. Margaret of Limburg
4. Henry II, Duke of Brabant
18. Matthew, Count of Boulogne
9. Matilda of Flanders
19. Marie I, Countess of Boulogne
2. Henry III, Duke of Brabant
20. Frederick I, Holy Roman Emperor
10. Philip of Swabia
21. Beatrice I, Countess of Burgundy
5. Marie of Swabia
22. Isaac II Angelos
11. Irene Angelina
23. Unknown Palaiologina?, afterwards Irene
1. Godfrey of Brabant
24. Hugh III, Duke of Burgundy
12. Odo III, Duke of Burgundy
25. Alice of Lorraine
6. Hugh IV, Duke of Burgundy
26. Hugues, Seigneur de Vergy
13. Alice of Vergy
27. Gillette de Trainel
3. Adelaide of Burgundy
28. Robert II, Count of Dreux
14. Robert III, Count of Dreux
29. Yolanda of Coucy
7. Yolande of Dreux
30. Thomas de Saint-Valéry
15. Aenor of Saint-Valéry
31. Adela de Ponthieu, Dame de Saint-Aubin
