= Eleanor of Castile =

Queen of England from 1272 to 1290

- Tomb effigy of Eleanor at Lincoln Cathedral

Queen consort of England
- Tenure: 20 November 1272 – 28 November 1290
- Coronation: 19 August 1274

Countess of Ponthieu
- Reign: 16 March 1279 – 28 November 1290
- Predecessor: Joan
- Successor: Edward II
- Alongside: Edward I
- Born: 1241; Burgos, Castile
- Died: 28 November 1290 (aged 48–49); Harby, Nottinghamshire, England
- Burial: 17 December 1290; Westminster Abbey, London, England
- Spouse: Edward I of England (m. 1254)
- Issue more...: Eleanor, Countess of Bar; Joan, Countess of Hertford; Alphonso, Earl of Chester; Margaret, Duchess of Brabant; Berengaria of England; Mary of Woodstock; Elizabeth, Countess of Hereford; Edward II of England
- House: Ivrea
- Father: Ferdinand III of Castile
- Mother: Joan, Countess of Ponthieu

Eleanor of Castile (1241 – 28 November 1290) was Queen of England as the first wife of Edward I. She was educated at the Castilian court and also ruled as Countess of Ponthieu in her own right (suo jure) from 1279. After diplomatic efforts to secure her marriage and affirm English sovereignty over Gascony, 13-year-old Eleanor was married to Edward at the monastery of Las Huelgas, Burgos, on 1 November 1254. She is believed to have birthed a child not long after.

Fuller records of Eleanor's life with Edward start from the time of the Second Barons' War onwards, when Simon de Montfort's government imprisoned her in Westminster Palace. Eleanor took an active role in Edward's reign as he began to take control of Henry III's post-war government. The marriage was particularly close; Edward and Eleanor travelled together extensively, including the Ninth Crusade, during which Edward was wounded at Acre. (Note: Later storytellers embellished this incident, creating a popular story of Eleanor saving Edward's life by sucking poison out of his wound, but this has long been discredited. The initial account from the early 1300s gives it as a story that was later recounted as fact by William Camden in his Britannia in 1586.) Eleanor was capable of influencing politics but died too young to have much effect.

In her lifetime, Eleanor was disliked for her property dealings; she bought up vast lands such as Leeds Castle from the middling landed classes after they went into arrears on loan repayments to Jewish moneylenders, and the Crown forced them to sell their bonds. These transactions associated Eleanor with the abuse of usury and the supposed exploitation of Jews, bringing her into conflict with the church. She profited from the hanging of over 300 Jewish alleged coin clippers and after the expulsion of the Jews in 1290, she gifted the former Canterbury Synagogue to her tailor. Eleanor died at Harby near Lincoln in late 1290; following her death, Edward built a stone cross at each stopping place on the journey to London, ending at Charing Cross, known as Eleanor crosses. This series of monuments may have included the renovated tomb of Little St Hugh – who was believed to have been ritually murdered by Jews – to bolster her reputation as an opponent of Jewish criminality.

Eleanor exerted a strong cultural influence. She was a keen patron of literature and encouraged the use of tapestries, carpets and tableware in the Spanish style, as well as innovative garden designs. She was a generous patron of the Dominican friars, founding priories in England, and supporting their work at Oxford and Cambridge universities. Notwithstanding the sources of her wealth, Eleanor's financial independence had a lasting impact on the institutional standing of English queens, establishing their future independence of action. After her death, Eleanor's reputation was shaped by conflicting fictitious accounts – both positive and negative – portraying her as either the dedicated companion of Edward I or as a scheming Spaniard. These accounts influenced the fate of the Eleanor crosses, for which she is probably best known today. Historians have generally neglected Eleanor and her reign as a topic of serious study, but she has received more attention since the 1980s.

== Early life ==
=== Birth and childhood ===
Eleanor was born in Burgos to Ferdinand III of Castile and Joan of Ponthieu. She was named after her paternal great-grandmother Eleanor of England, the daughter of Eleanor of Aquitaine and Henry II of England.

Eleanor was the second of five children. (Note: For the ceremonies in 1291 marking the first anniversary of Eleanor's death, 49 candle-bearers were paid to walk in a public procession to commemorate each year of her life. The tradition was to have one candle for each year of the deceased's life so 49 candles would date Eleanor's birth to 1240 or 1241.) Because her parents were separated for 13 months while King Ferdinand was on a military campaign in Andalusia – from which he returned to the north of Spain in February 1241 – Eleanor was probably born towards the end of that year. The courts of her father and her half-brother Alfonso X of Castile were known for their literary atmosphere. Both kings encouraged extensive education of the royal children so it is likely Eleanor was educated to a standard higher than the norm, a likelihood that is reinforced by her later literary activities as queen. Eleanor was at her father's deathbed in Seville in 1252.

=== Prospective bride to Theobald II of Navarre ===
Eleanor's marriage in 1254 to the future Edward I of England was not the only marriage her family planned for her. The kings of Castile had long made a tenuous claim to be paramount lords of the Kingdom of Navarre due to sworn homage from Garcia VI of Navarre in 1134. In 1253, Ferdinand III's heir Alfonso X of Castile – Eleanor's half-brother – appears to have stalled negotiations with England in the hope she would marry Theobald II of Navarre. The marriage would have afforded several advantages: the Pyrenees kingdom afforded passage from Castile to Gascony; and Theobald II was not yet of age so an opportunity to rule or potentially annex Navarre into Castile existed. To avoid Castilian control, in August 1253, Margaret of Bourbon – mother and regent to Theobald II – allied with James I of Aragon instead, and as part of that treaty, solemnly promised Theobald would never marry Eleanor.

=== Marriage ===
In 1252, Alfonso X resurrected an ancestral claim to the Duchy of Gascony in the south of Aquitaine – the last possession of the kings of England in France – which he claimed had formed part of the dowry of Eleanor of England. Henry III of England swiftly countered Alfonso's claims with both diplomatic and military moves. Early in 1253, the two kings began to negotiate; after haggling over the financial provision for Eleanor, Henry and Alfonso agreed she would marry Henry's son Edward, who now held the title of Duke of Gascony, and Alfonso would transfer his Gascon claims to Edward. Henry was anxious for the marriage to take place; he willingly abandoned the already-made, elaborate preparations for the knighting of Edward in England and agreed Alfonso would knight Edward on or before the next Feast of Assumption.

Eleanor and Edward were married at the monastery of Las Huelgas, Burgos, on 1 November 1254. Edward and Eleanor were second cousins once removed because Edward's grandfather King John of England and Eleanor's great-grandmother Eleanor of England were the son and daughter of King Henry II and Eleanor of Aquitaine. Following the marriage, they spent nearly a year in Gascony and Edward ruled as lord of Aquitaine. During this time, Eleanor, aged thirteen and a half, almost certainly gave birth to her first child, a short-lived daughter. Eleanor travelled to England alone in mid-1255, and Edward followed her a few months later.

Henry III resolved the Gascon crisis but Eleanor's position in England would have been difficult; some of her relatives travelled to England soon after her marriage. Eleanor's brother Henry of Castile stayed in England for three years, hoping Henry III would help him reconcile with his brother Alfonso. While Eleanor was still young and childless, the prospect of a new Castilian family faction at court would have been troubling for those surrounding Henry, making Eleanor's position precarious.

=== Second Barons' War ===
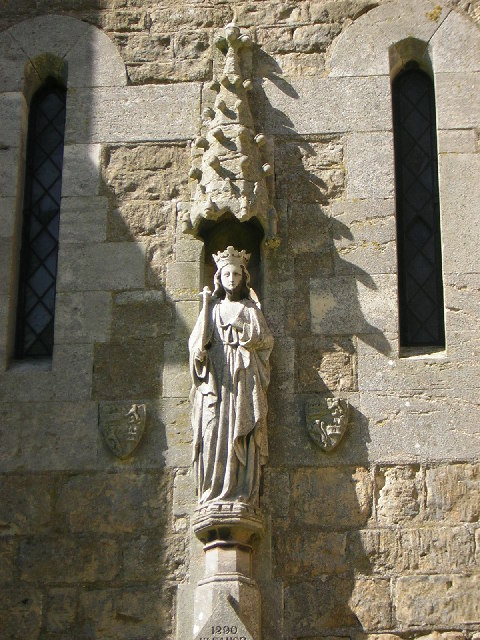
A statue of Eleanor, at the church at Harby, where she died in 1290.

There is little record of Eleanor's life in England until the 1260s, when the Second Barons' War between Henry III and his barons divided the kingdom. During this time, Eleanor actively supported Edward's interests, importing archers from Ponthieu, France. Eleanor was in England during the war, and held Windsor Castle and baronial prisoners for Edward. Rumours Eleanor was seeking fresh troops from Castile led the baronial leader Simon de Montfort to order her removal from Windsor Castle in June 1264 after the defeat of the royalist army at the Battle of Lewes.

Edward was captured at Lewes and imprisoned, and Eleanor was confined at Westminster Palace. After Edward's and Henry's army defeated the baronial army at the Battle of Evesham in 1265, Edward took a major role in reforming the government, and Eleanor rose to prominence. In July 1266, after she had birthed three short-lived daughters, Eleanor gave birth to a son John, who was followed in early 1268 by a second boy named Henry, and in June 1269 by a healthy daughter named Eleanor.

=== Crusade ===
Eleanor of Castile came from a family who were heavily involved in the Crusades; Eleanor appears to have been very committed to the church's call to arms, and took a vow to participate. Women were not obliged to travel to fulfil their vow and if not prohibited from doing so were discouraged. Although other female members of her family had travelled on crusade, it was an unusual thing to do.

By 1270, England was at peace, and Edward and Eleanor left to join Edward's uncle Louis IX of France on the Eighth Crusade. Louis died at Carthage before they arrived; the couple spent the winter in Sicily then proceeded to Acre in the Holy Land, where they arrived in May 1271. Eleanor gave birth to a daughter, who is known as Joan of Acre for her birthplace.

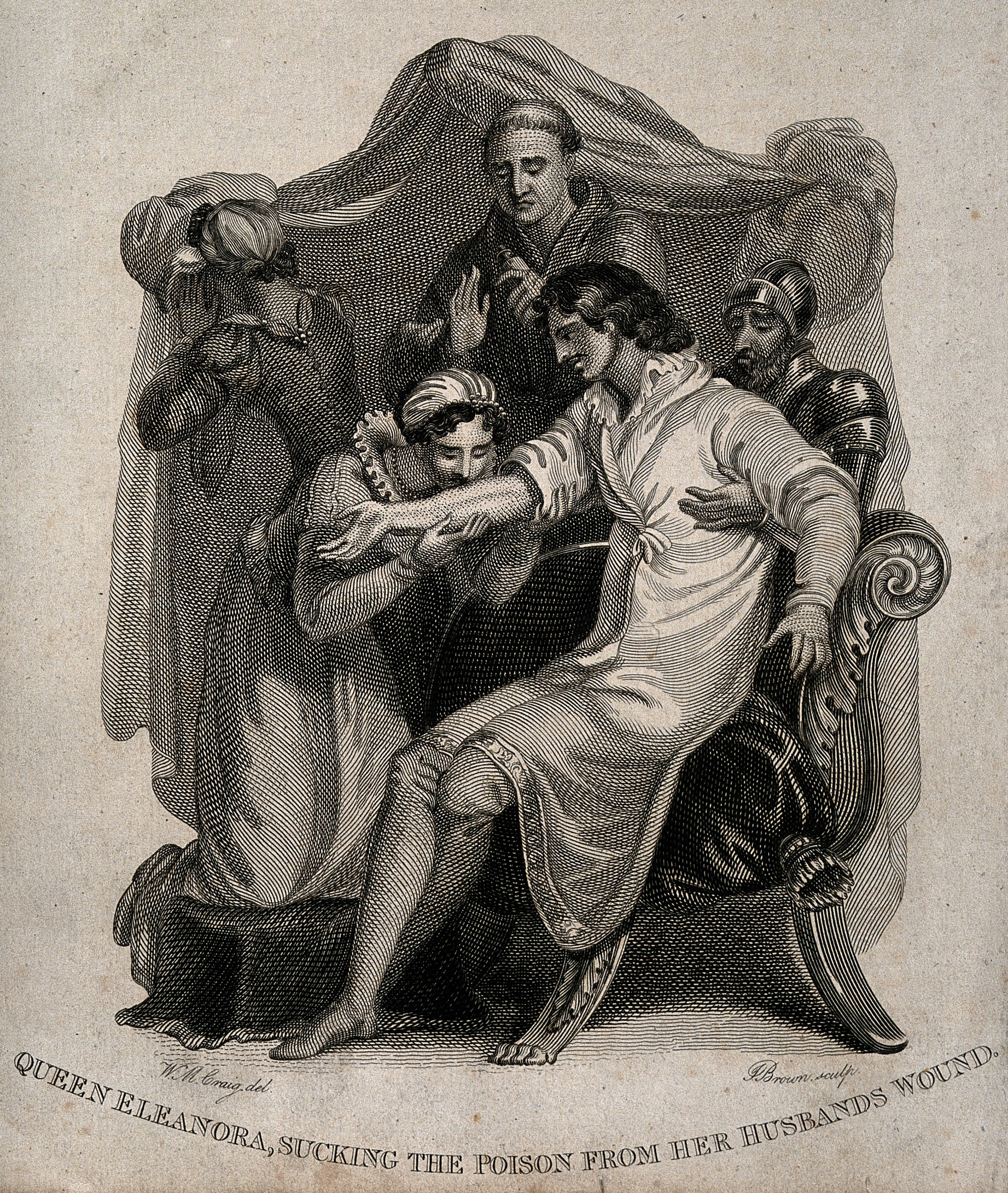
Queen Eleanor sucking the poison from King Edward's arm (19th century engraving by Brown after W.M. Craig)

The crusade was militarily a failure but Baibars of the Bahri dynasty was worried by Edward's presence at Acre and in June 1272, an assassination attempt was made on Edward. Edward was wounded in the arm by a dagger that is thought to have been poisoned. The wound quickly became seriously inflamed and a surgeon saved Edward by excising the diseased flesh after Eleanor was led away from his bed "weeping and wailing".

Eleanor and Edward left Acre in September 1272. In Sicily that December, they learnt of Henry III's death on 16 November. Following a trip to Gascony, where their next child Alphonso – named for Eleanor's half-brother Alfonso X – was born, Edward and Eleanor returned to England and were crowned together on 19 August 1274.

== Queen consort of England ==
Available evidence indicates Eleanor and Edward were devoted to each other, and it appears that Edward was faithful to her in the marriage. The couple were rarely apart; Eleanor accompanied Edward on military campaigns in Wales, giving birth to their son Edward at Caernarfon Castle on 25 April 1284. Their household records narrate incidents that imply a comfortable, even humorous, relationship. Each year on Easter Monday, Edward allowed Eleanor's ladies to trap him in his bed and paid them a token ransom so he could go to her bedroom on the first day after Lent; this custom was so important to Edward that in 1291, on the first Easter Monday after Eleanor's death, he gave her ladies the money he would have given them if she had been alive. Edward disliked ceremonies. In 1290, he refused to attend the marriage of Earl Marshal Roger Bigod, 5th Earl of Norfolk; Eleanor paid minstrels to play for him while he sat alone during the wedding.

=== Land acquisition and unpopularity ===
Eleanor's acquisition of lands was unprecedented for an English queen: between 1274 and 1290, she acquired estates worth about £2,600 yearly. This provided a majority of her expenditure, which amounted to £8,000 a year at the time of her death, while income from her dower lands was worth £4,500, to which she would be entitled in the event of Edward's death. Edward initiated this process, as he wanted the queen to hold lands sufficient for her financial needs without drawing on funds needed for government, and to be independent if she was widowed. The process began after the Battle of Evesham when Eleanor received the grant of lands formerly held by rebels.

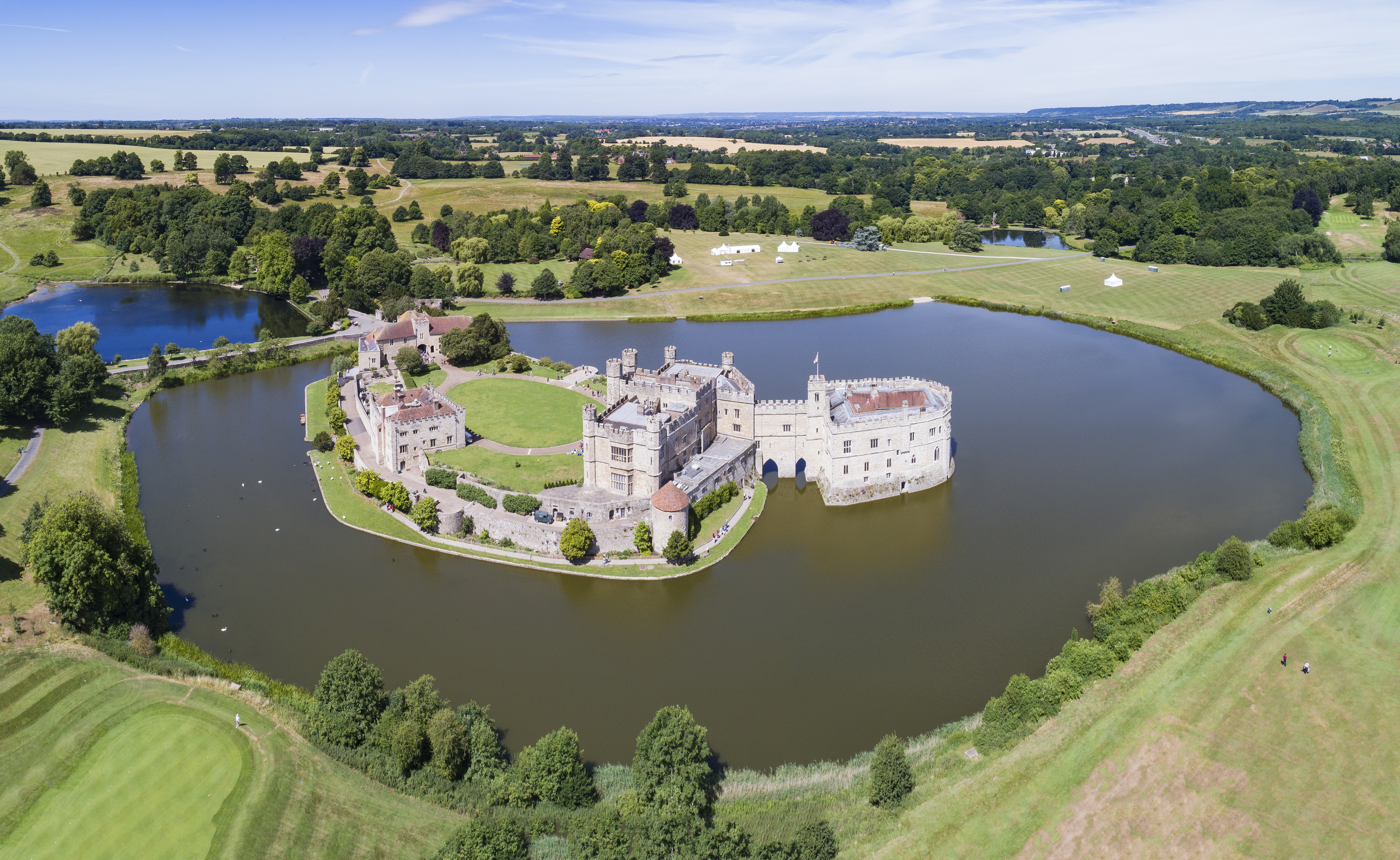
Leeds Castle, Kent, was acquired at vast discount by Eleanor through the forced sale of debt bonds from Jews.

Between 1270 and 1281, a significant method for Eleanor to acquire land was the cheap purchase of debts owed by Christian landlords to Jewish moneylenders. In exchange for cancelling the debts, she received the lands pledged against the debts. Since the early 1200s, the Jewish community had been taxed well beyond its means, leading to a reduction in the capital the small number of rich Jewish moneylenders had to support their lending. Jews were also disallowed from holding land assets. Bonds for lands could be sold to recoup against a defaulted debt but these could only be traded by royal permission, meaning Eleanor and a select group of very wealthy courtiers were the exclusive beneficiaries of these sales. The periodic excessive taxes of the Jews called "tallages" would force them to sell their bonds very cheaply, and these would be bought by courtiers. Access to these cut-price land bonds can be viewed as a form of royal patronage.

Popular poem, quoted by Walter of Guisborough:

The king would like to get our gold,
the queen, our manors fair, to hold ...

By the 1270s, this situation had led the Jewish community into a desperate position while Edward, Eleanor and a few others gained vast new estates. According to contemporaries, however, the problem resulted from Jewish "usury", which contributed to a rise in anti-Semitic beliefs. Eleanor's participation in Jewish usury and dispossession of middling landowners caused her to be criticised, both by members of the landed classes and by the church. An example of a cheaply-purchased estate is the release of Leeds Castle to Edward and Eleanor by William de Leybourne; it became a favourite residence. Through these acquisitions, Eleanor gained an "unsavoury reputation". Records of her unpopularity are common: for instance, Walter of Guisborough highlighted her reputation and preserved a contemporaneous poem reflecting her acquisitiveness. The annalist of Dunstable Priory noted in a contemporary notice of her death: "a Spaniard by birth, she acquired many fine manors". John Peckham, Archbishop of Canterbury, warned Eleanor's servants about her activities in the land market and her association with the highly unpopular moneylenders:

A rumour is waxing strong throughout the kingdom and has generated much scandal. It is said that the illustrious lady queen, whom you serve, is occupying many manors, lands, and other possessions of nobles, and has made them her own property – lands which the Jews have extorted with usury from Christians under the protection of the royal court.

Peckham also warned Eleanor of complaints against her officials' demands upon her tenants.

The majority of the lands Eleanor acquired were not acquired through the cheap acquisition of Jewish bonds. This method declined after 1275, and especially after 1281, because the Crown had largely removed the wealth of the Jewish community. By the late 1280s, Eleanor's income from the lands she had acquired was sufficient to fund future purchases. Eleanor's selection of lands was judicious, and aimed at consolidation of her estates. Neighbouring rather than isolated lands were chosen, and the price of the potential acquisitions was less important than whether it would make sense for her estate's management. Eleanor was able to seek lands because of the intelligence gathered by her advisors, and had tremendous advantages and wealth in being able to choose such strategies. She was also able to compromise with those whose lands were being purchased. It was not necessarily important to her strategy whether lands were immediately handed to her, or for the lowest possible price, for instance, which distinguished her from other courtiers, whose acquisitions tended to be more straightforwardly immediately profitable. There is evidence Eleanor's managers could impose very strict terms, and that she would have known of their actions; and she paid close attention to her property dealings. Eleanor acquired debts that had to be cleared on her succession to Ponthieu in 1279, and went on to acquire 24 properties in the region in the following years, partly financed from her English income.

Eleanor's executors' financial accounts record the payments of reparations to many of those who brought actions before the judicial proceedings in 1291, done on Eleanor's request shortly before her death to provide redress for wrongdoings in her property dealings. She is likely to have been aware of the heavy-handed tactics of her administrators because she was regularly notified of activities regarding her estates. Notwithstanding the manner by which she acquired her estates and income, Eleanor of Castile's queenship is significant in English history for the evolution of a stable financial system for the king's wife and for the honing this process gave the queen-consort's prerogatives.

=== Other income ===
As queen, Eleanor had income other than that from her estates. Queen's gold was paid as an additional sum of ten percent on taxes. She also benefited from revenues from vacant estates, and could be granted income from trials and seizures, but the income she received from these sources was at the king's discretion rather than being a right.

Eleanor was granted significant income from hidden or unclaimed assets resulting from trials. For instance, during the late 1270s, Jews were targeted for coin-clipping offences. Although the evidence was largely fictional, around ten percent of the Jewish population – over 300 individuals – was sentenced to death; their assets were seized and forfeit to the Crown, together with fines for those who escaped hanging. Over £16,500 was collected, from which Eleanor received a significant portion. Other income from Jews came from seizures of their property at death, particularly if Eleanor had close financial relationships with them. Following the 1290 Edict of Expulsion, with which the whole Jewish population was expelled from England, their houses, debts and other property was forfeit to the Crown. Around £2,000 was raised for the Crown from sales but much was given away in about 85 grants to courtiers, friends and family; Eleanor gave the synagogue at Canterbury to her tailor.

=== Political influence ===
Eleanor was given little overt political role; even in diplomatic matters her role was minor. Edward heeded her advice on the age at which their daughters could marry foreign rulers, preventing her 12-year-old daughter Eleanor from leaving England in 1282. Eleanor of Castile was in part educated in diplomatic practices – such as giving gifts to visiting princes and envoys, as a means to win influence, and in the art of interceding to reduce friction from disputes – by Edward's mother Eleanor of Provence. While Edward honoured his obligations to Eleanor's half-brother Alfonso X, his support may be seen as relatively limited. When Alfonso's need was desperate in the early 1280s, Edward did not send English knights to Castile but sent knights from Gascony, which was closer to Castile.

Eleanor played a role in Edward's counsels but she did not overtly exercise power except on occasions when she was appointed to mediate disputes between nobles in England and Gascony. Eleanor directed Edward's attention to Vegetius when she commissioned an Old French translation of De Re Militari while on Crusade in Acre in 1272. She also intervened in disputes, for instance to limit the consequences of the Baronial rebellions and to defend the Earl of Cornwall in 1287 against charges of incompetence, arguing they were unjustified. Eleanor was a "clever operator" at court with "unique influence" due to Edward's love for her. She appears to have limited her role to avoid the wide criticism her mother-in-law had experienced, and perhaps due to her immediate concerns with pregnancies and building her landholdings.

Edward was prepared to resist Eleanor's demands or to stop her if he felt she was excessive in her activities, and he expected his ministers to restrain her if her actions threatened to inconvenience important people in his realm; on one occasion, the Lord Chancellor Robert Burnell assured the Bishop of Winchester, from whom the queen was demanding the repayment of a debt the bishop owed her, that he would speak with the queen and that afterwards the business would end happily for the bishop. As queen, Eleanor's major opportunity for power and influence would have come later in her life, when her sons grew older, by promoting their political and military careers.

==== Promotion of her relatives ====
Coat of arms of Eleanor of Castile as Queen of England

Eleanor patronised many of her relatives, though as queen, given the unpopularity of foreigners in England, and the criticism of Henry III and Eleanor of Provence's generosity to them, Eleanor of Castile was cautious to choose which cousins to support. Rather than marry her male cousins to English heiresses, which would put English wealth in foreign hands, Eleanor arranged marriages to English barons for her female cousins. Edward strongly supported Eleanor in these endeavours, which provided him and his family – alongside Eleanor in her potential widowhood – with an expanded network of potential supporters.

In a few cases, Eleanor's marriage projects for her female cousins provided Edward, as well as her father-in-law Henry III, with opportunities to sustain healthy relations with other realms. The marriage of Eleanor's kinswoman Marguerite de Guînes to the Earl of Ulster, one of the most-influential English noblemen in Ireland, gave Edward a new family connection in Ireland and also with Scotland because Marguerite's cousin Marie de Coucy was the mother of Edward's brother-in-law Alexander III. The earliest of Eleanor's recorded marriage projects linked one of her Châtellerault cousins with a member of the Lusignan family, Henry III's highly favoured maternal relatives, strengthening the king's ties with that family and creating a new tie between the English king and a powerful family in Poitou, northern Gascony.

=== Cultural and other interests ===
Although she was allowed no overt political role, Eleanor found other satisfying outlets. She was an active patron of literature, maintaining the only royal scriptorium known to have existed at the time in Northern Europe, with scribes and at least one illuminator to copy books for her. Some of the works produced were vernacular romances and saints' lives but Eleanor's tastes were wider than that and were not limited to the products of her own writing office. The number and variety of new works written for her show her interests were broad and sophisticated.

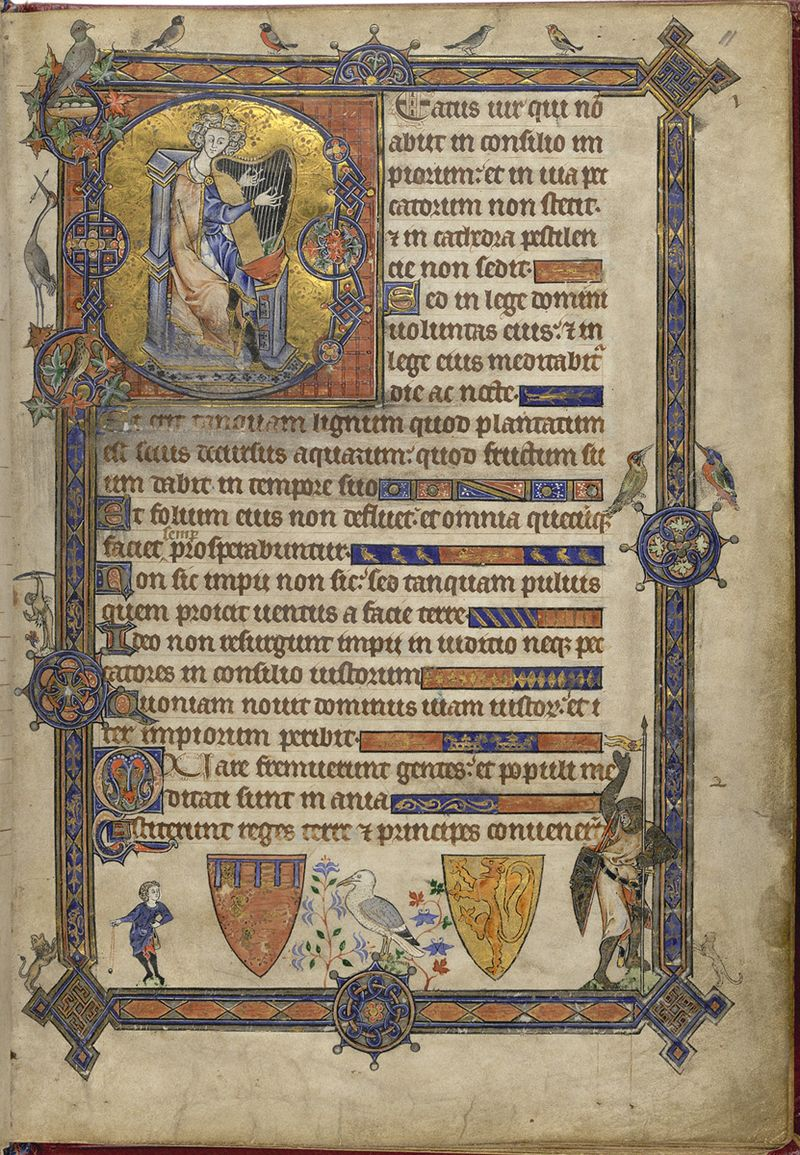
The Alphonso Psalter, or book of psalms, believed to have been commissioned by Eleanor

After Eleanor succeeded her mother as Countess of Ponthieu in 1279, a romance about the life of a fictional, ninth-century count of Ponthieu was written for her. Eleanor commissioned an Arthurian romance with a Northumbrian theme, possibly for the marriage of the Northumbrian lord John de Vescy, who married a close friend and relation of hers. In the 1280s, Archbishop Peckham wrote a theological work for Eleanor to explain angels and their roles. She almost certainly commissioned the Alphonso Psalter, which is now in the British Library, and is also thought to be the commissioner of the Bird Psalter, which bears the arms of Alphonso and his prospective wife. Eleanor's accounts reveal her corresponding in 1290 with an Oxford master about one of her books. There is also evidence Eleanor exchanged books with her brother Alfonso X. Eleanor is assumed to have spoken French, which was her mother's language and the dominant language of the English court. All of the extant literary works created for Eleanor are in French.

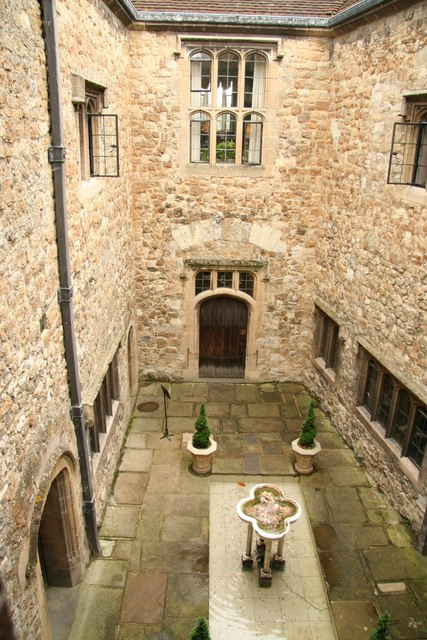
Water feature in the Fountain Court at Leeds Castle

In the domestic sphere, Eleanor emphasised comfort and made changes to residences to reflect her taste. She commissioned piped bath works at Leeds Castle and tiled bathrooms elsewhere, echoing the bathroom culture of Castile. Eleanor popularised the use of tapestries and carpets; the use of hangings and especially floor coverings was noted as a Spanish extravagance on her arrival in London but by the time of her death, it was much in vogue among rich magnates. Eleanor also promoted the use of fine tableware, elegantly decorated knives, and forks, though it is uncertain whether forks were used as personal eating utensils or as serving pieces from the common bowls or platters. She also had considerable influence on the development of garden design in the royal estates. Extensive spending on gardens, including the use of water features (such as fountains) – commonly found in Castilian garden designs – is in evidence at her properties and in most places she stayed. The picturesque Gloriette (or elevated garden building) at Leeds Castle was developed during Eleanor's ownership; she also introduced fishponds, aviaries with song birds, and Spanish flora to her gardens and grounds. Her household food supplies appear to have reflected her Spanish upbringing; they include olive oil, French cheese and fresh fruit. She also kept a connection with Acre and her time in the Crusades, ordering foodstuffs and other items from Acre throughout her time in England.

Eleanor had a keen interest in hunting, particularly with dogs. The royal family appears to have stayed each February at Quenington in the Cotswolds for hunting. She was a keen horse rider and employed Spanish horse-breeders. Eleanor enthusiastically played chess and backgammon, and passed this interest to her children.

=== Religious views and patronage ===
Contemporaneous monastic chroniclers are noticeably silent on Eleanor's piety, which was considered an important quality of a queen. The lack of material may be due to Eleanor's distance from the English Bishops, who represented traditional hierarchy, and her preference for the Dominican Order of Friars, to whom she was a patron, founding several priories in England and supporting their work at Oxford and Cambridge Universities. Eleanor's piety was intellectual and reinforced the idea the higher powers were in Eleanor's favour. Apart from her religious foundations, Eleanor was not given to direct good works; she left her chaplains to distribute alms for her. Eleanor gave significant funds to charitable foundations.

=== Eleanor as a mother ===
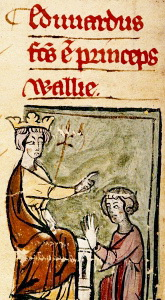
Edward I and his son, the Prince of Wales and future Edward II, portrayed in 1301, some eleven years after Eleanor's death

Eleanor birthed between 14 and 17 children, only six of whom survived into adulthood. Most of Eleanor's children were born at Windsor, although she gave birth to three while on travels. It has been suggested Eleanor and Edward were more devoted to each other than to their children. As king and queen, it was impossible for them to spend much time in one place; when the children were very young, they could not tolerate the rigours of constant travel with their parents. The children had a household that was staffed with attendants who were carefully chosen for competence and loyalty, and with whom the parents regularly corresponded. The children lived in this comfortable establishment until they were about seven years old, after which they began to accompany their parents on important occasions. By the time they were 13, the children spent much of their time with their parents. In 1290, Eleanor sent one of her scribes to join her children's household, probably to help with their education.

Eleanor's children were frequently cared for by relatives and other trusted families. In 1274, when their six-year-old son Henry lay dying at Guildford neither parent made the short journey from London to see him but Edward's mother Eleanor of Provence tended to Henry. Henry had lived with his grandmother while his parents were absent on crusade, and because he was just two years old when they left England in 1270, he could not have had substantial memories of them when they returned to England in August 1274, only weeks before his death. The dowager queen was a more familiar and comforting presence to her grandson than his parents would have been. Edward and Eleanor allowed her mother Joan, Countess of Ponthieu to raise their daughter Joan of Acre in Ponthieu; the practice of fostering noble children in other dignified households was common. Edward and Eleanor regretted allowing Joan of Ponthieu to foster Joan; when six-year-old Joan travelled to England in 1278, they found she had been spoilt; she was a spirited child and at times defiant.

=== Character ===
To her immediate friends and family, Eleanor appears to have been kind, loyal and considerate, and although not overtly charming; she appears to have had a sense of humour, employing two fools, for example. Her taste in everyday clothes and emphasis on repairing rather than replacing where possible, contrasting with her predecessors and successors, suggests some practicality in her nature. With those outside her inner circle, Eleanor was frequently harsh and manipulative, and is known to have frequently lost her temper.

Two letters from Peckham show some people thought Eleanor urged Edward to rule harshly, and that she could be a severe woman who did not take it lightly if anyone crossed her, contravening contemporaneous expectations that queens should intercede with their husbands on behalf of the needy, the oppressed and the condemned. Edward warned a convent of nuns: "if they knew what was good for them", they would accede to the queen's wishes and accept into their house a woman the convent had refused, whose vocation Eleanor had decided to sponsor. Records from the king's administrations shows Hugh Despenser the Elder, who agreed to allow Eleanor to hold one of his manors for a term of years to clear his debt to her, thought it well to demand official assurances from the King's Exchequer the manor would be restored to him as soon as the queen had recovered the exact amount of the debt. A chronicle written at St Albans in 1307–1308 includes the first positive assessment of Eleanor's character, though the chronicler may have been writing to flatter her son Edward II, who had succeeded his father in 1307.

== Death ==
Eleanor of Castile had birthed at least 16 children, suggesting she was not frail. Shortly after the birth of her last child, financial accounts from Edward's household and her own show frequent payments for medicines for the queen's use. The nature of the medicines is not specified in these documents, so the nature of Eleanor's illness cannot be deduced until late 1287, when Eleanor is recorded as having a double quartan fever, while she was in Gascony with Edward. This suggests she was suffering from a strain of malaria. Malaria is not directly fatal but weakens its victims and makes them vulnerable to opportunistic infections. Among other complications, the liver and spleen become enlarged, brittle and susceptible to injury, which may cause death from internal bleeding. It is also possible that hereditary heart conditions caused Eleanor's death.

Eleanor returned from Gascony in August 1289, and there are signs from early 1290 that Eleanor may have been aware of her impending death. Arrangements were made for the marriage of her daughters Margaret and Joan, and negotiations for the marriage of young Edward of Caernarfon to Margaret, the Maid of Norway, heiress of Scotland, were hurried on. In mid 1290, a tour north through Eleanor's properties began, but proceeded much more slowly than usual, and the autumn Parliament was convened in Clipstone rather than in London. Eleanor's children were summoned to visit her in Clipstone, despite warnings travel might endanger their health. Following the conclusion of the Parliament, Eleanor and Edward set out on the short distance from Clipstone to Lincoln. By this time, Eleanor was travelling fewer than eight miles (13 km) per day.

Eleanor's final stop was at the village of Harby, Nottinghamshire, less than seven miles (11 km) from Lincoln. The journey was abandoned and the queen was lodged in the house of Richard de Weston, the foundations of which can still be seen near Harby's parish church. After piously receiving the Church's last rites, Eleanor died there on the evening of 28 November 1290, aged 49 and after 36 years of marriage. Edward was at Eleanor's bedside to hear her final requests.

Edward was greatly affected by Eleanor's death, shown for instance in his January 1291 letter to the abbot of Cluny in France, in which he sought prayers for the soul of the wife "whom living we dearly cherished, and whom dead we cannot cease to love". Only one of Eleanor's four sons survived childhood, and even before she died, Edward worried over the succession: if that son died, their daughters' husbands might cause a succession war. Edward therefore married again, in 1299 to Margaret of France. He delighted in the sons his new wife bore, but attended memorial services for Eleanor to the end of his life.

=== Procession, burial and monuments ===
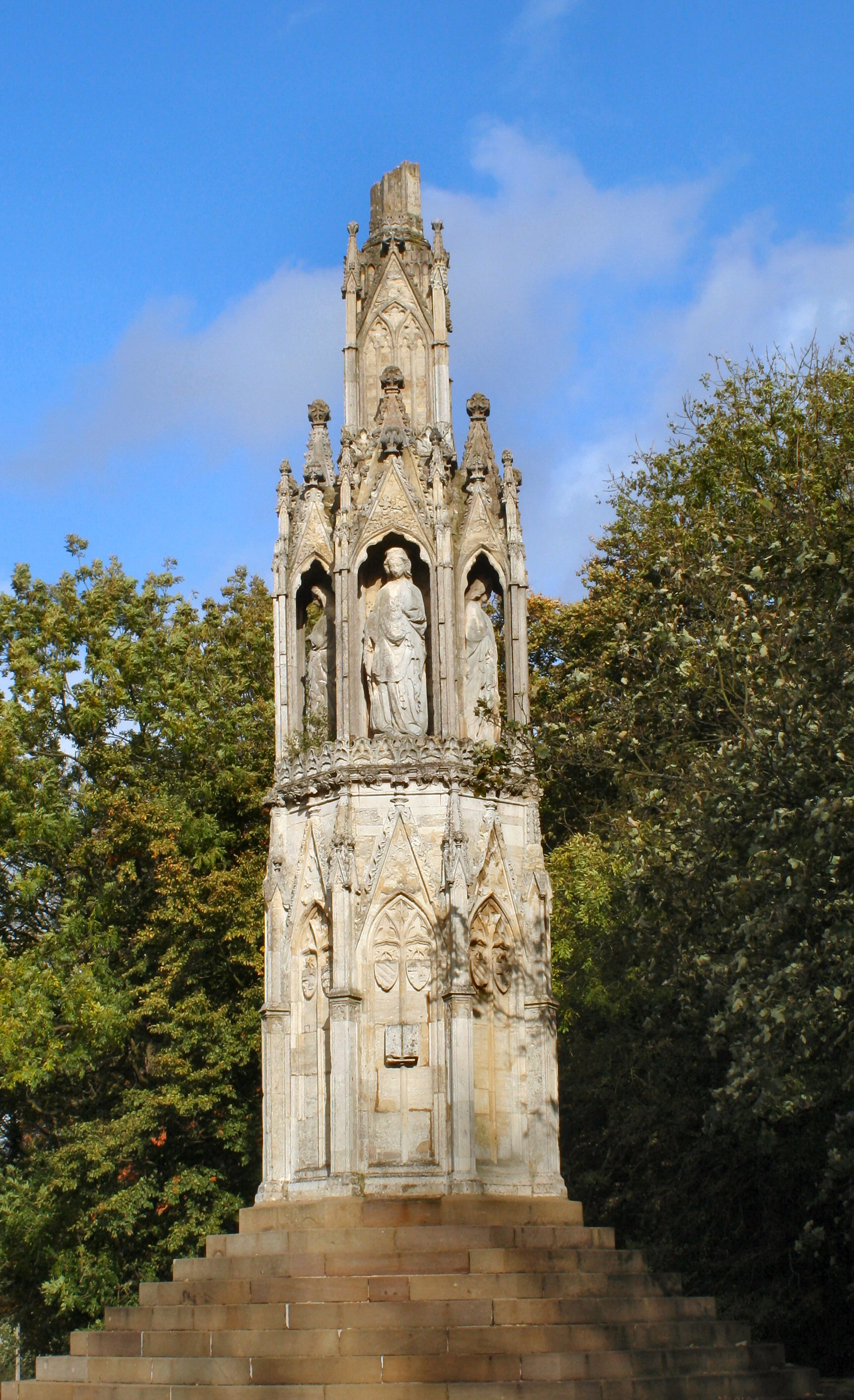
The Northampton Cross

Eleanor's embalmed body was borne in great state from Lincoln to Westminster Abbey, through the heartland of Eleanor's properties, and accompanied for most of the way by Edward and a substantial cortege of mourners. Edward ordered the erection of memorial crosses at the site of each overnight stop between Lincoln and Westminster. These artistically significant monuments, which were based on crosses in France marking Louis IX's funeral procession, enhanced the image of Edward's kingship and bear witness to his grief. Eleanor crosses stood at Lincoln, Grantham, Stamford, Geddington, Hardingstone near Northampton, Stony Stratford, Woburn, Dunstable, St Albans, Waltham, Westcheap and Charing. Only three of these monuments have survived, none in their entirety. The cross at Geddington is the best-preserved example. All three monuments have lost their crosses "of immense height" that originally surmounted them; only the lower stages remain. The Waltham cross has been heavily restored and to prevent further deterioration, its original statues of Eleanor are now in the Victoria and Albert Museum, London.

The monument now known as "Charing Cross" in London, in front of the Charing Cross railway station, was built in 1865 to publicise the railway hotel at Charing station. The original Charing cross was at the top of Whitehall on the south side of Trafalgar Square; it was destroyed in 1647 by Puritans and later replaced with a statue of Charles I.

In the 13th century, embalming involving evisceration and separate burial of heart and body was not unusual. Eleanor was afforded an unusual triple burial; her viscera, heart and body were separately buried. Eleanor's viscera were buried in Lincoln Cathedral, where Edward placed a duplicate of the Westminster tomb. The Lincoln tomb's original stone chest survives; its effigy was destroyed in the 17th century and was replaced with a 19th-century copy. (Note: On the outside of Lincoln Cathedral are two statues often identified as Edward and Eleanor; these images were heavily restored and given new heads in the 19th century.)

Also built in the same style as the Eleanor crosses and Eleanor's tomb at Lincoln was the renovated shrine of Little Saint Hugh, a cult that was based on a false ritual murder allegation made against Jews. It is likely the association with Eleanor was made to help improve her posthumous reputation because she had been closely associated with the abuse of Jewish loans. According to historians Caroline and Joe Hillaby, the crosses and tomb amounted to a "propaganda coup", rehabilitating Eleanor's image and portraying her as the protector of Christians against the supposed criminality of Jews following the expulsion of the Jewry.

Eleanor's heart was buried in the Dominican priory at Blackfriars, London, along with that of her son Alphonso. The accounts of her executors show the monument constructed at the priory to commemorate her heart burial was richly elaborate, and included wall paintings and a metallic angelic statue that stood under a carved stone canopy. It was destroyed in the 16th century during the dissolution of the monasteries.

Eleanor's funeral took place in Westminster Abbey on 17 December 1290. Eleanor's tomb, which she had probably ordered before her death, consists of a marble chest with carved mouldings and shields – originally painted – of the arms of England, Castile and Ponthieu. The chest is surmounted by William Torel's gilt-bronze effigy of Eleanor in the same pose as the image on her great seal.

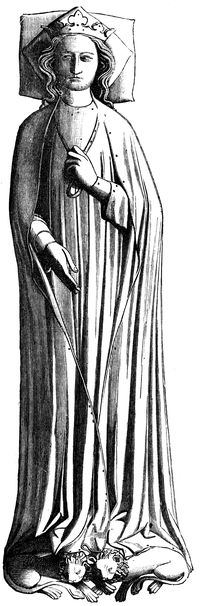
Drawing of Eleanor's tomb effigy in Westminster Abbey

== Historical reputation ==
Despite her negative reputation in her lifetime, the St Albans Chronicle and the Eleanor Crosses assured Eleanor of Castile a romantic and flattering, if slightly obscure, standing in the two centuries following her death. In 1586, the antiquarian William Camden first published in England the tale of Eleanor saving Edward's life at Acre by sucking his wound. Camden ascribed the construction of the Eleanor crosses to Edward's grief at the loss of a heroic wife, who had risked her own life to save his. (Note: See Griffin 2009, p. 52 Camden's discussion of the crosses reflected the religious history of his time. The crosses were intended to induce passers-by to pray for Eleanor's soul but the Protestant Reformation in England had officially ended the practice of praying for the souls of the dead so Camden ascribed Edward's commemoration of his wife to her supposed heroism in saving Edward's life at the risk of her own.) In 1587, Raphael Holinshed's Chronicles of England, Scotland and Ireland described Eleanor as "the jewel [Edward I] most esteemed ... a godly and modest princess, full of pity, and one that showed much favour to the English nation, ready to relieve every man's grief that sustained wrong and to make them friends that were at discord, so far as in her lay."

A counter-narrative that was driven by rising anti-Spanish feeling in England from the Reformation may have begun to emerge. The Lamentable Fall of Queene Elenor, a popular ballad sung to the popular tune "Gentle and Courteous", is thought to date from the 1550s, and to be an indirect attack on the half-Spanish queen Mary Tudor and her husband Philip II of Spain. (Note: The first printing of this ballad is from 1600, ten years after George Peele's Edward I was first performed; but the ballad in oral form is considered likely to date to the reign of Mary. Griffin 2009, p. 56; Cockerill 2014) The song depicts Eleanor as vain and violent: she demands of the king "that ev'ry man / That ware long lockes of hair, / Might then be cut and polled all"; she orders "That ev'ry womankind should have / Their right breast cut away"; she imprisons and tortures the Lady Mayoress of London, eventually murdering the Mayoress with poisonous snakes; she blasphemes against God on the common ground at Charing, causing the ground to swallow her up; and finally, miraculously spat up by the ground at Queen's Hithe, and now on her death-bed, she confesses to murder of the Mayoress and to committing infidelity with a friar, by whom she has borne a child.

This was followed in the 1590s by George Peele's The Famous Chronicle of King Edward the First. The first version of this, written in the early 1590s, is thought to have presented a positive depiction of the relationship between Eleanor and Edward. If so, it disappeared with little trace. The surviving revised version, which was printed in 1593, depicts Eleanor as a haughty "villainess capable of unspeakable treachery, cruelty, and depravity"; she is also depicted as intransigent and hubristic, "concerned primarily with enhancing the reputation of her native nation, and evidently accustomed to a tyrannous and quite un-English exercise of royal prerogative"; delaying her coronation for twenty weeks so she can have Spanish dresses made, and proclaiming she shall keep the English under a "Spanish yoke". The misdeeds attributed to her in The Lamentable Fall of Queene Elenor are repeated and expanded upon; Eleanor is now also shown to box her husband's ears. Eleanor confesses to adultery with her brother-in-law Edmund Crouchback and to conceiving all of her children, except Edward I's heir Edward II, in adultery; this revelation prompts her unfortunate daughter Joan of Acre, who is fathered by a French friar, to drop dead of shame. This portrait of Eleanor owes little to historicity, and much to the then-current war with Spain and English fears of another attempt at invasion, and is one of a number of anti-Spanish polemics of the period.

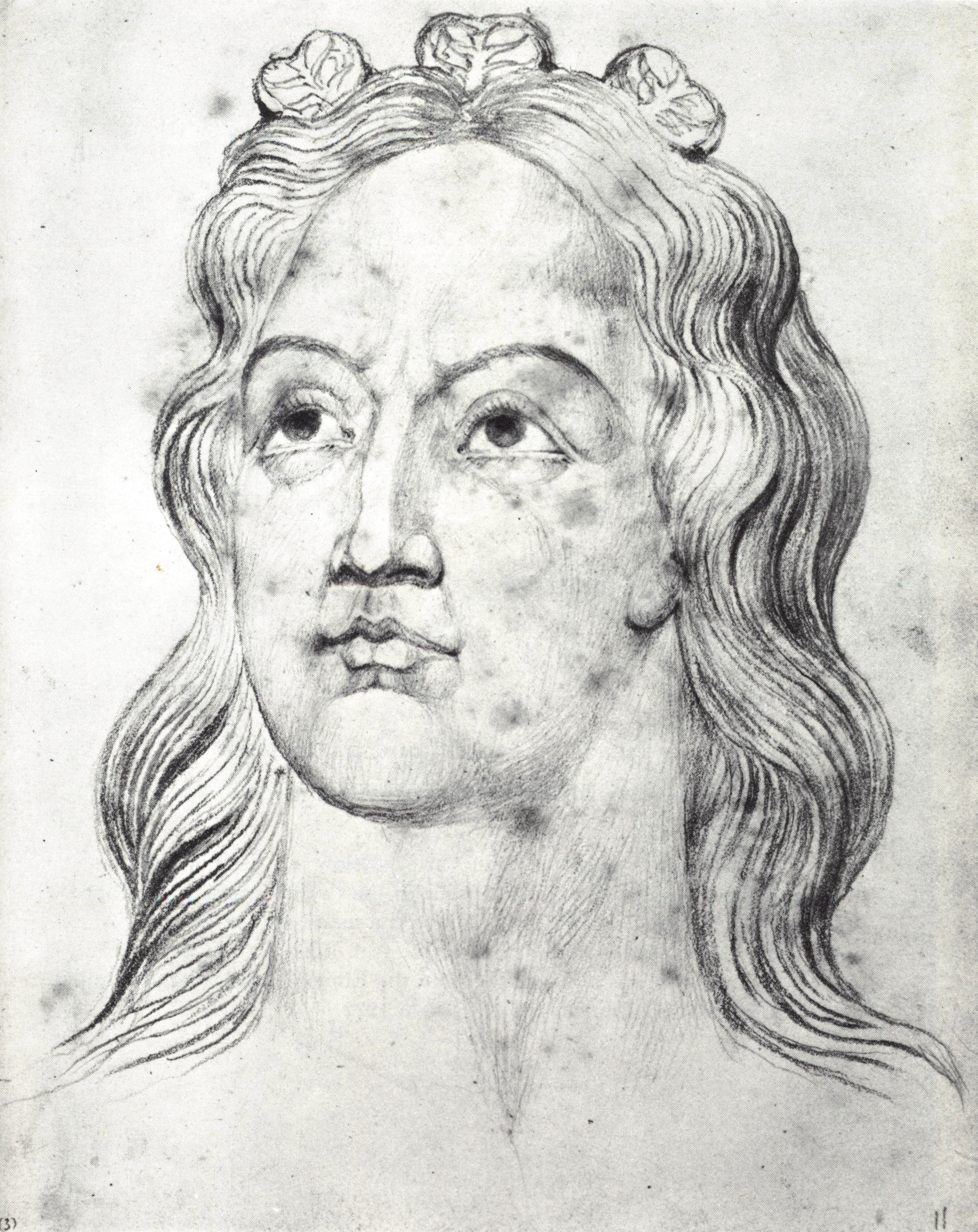
Visionary Head of Eleanor by William Blake, 1820

It is likely Peele's play and the ballad associated with it had a significant effect on the survival of the Eleanor Crosses in the 17th century. Performances of the play and reprints of The Lamentable Fall – which was reprinted in 1628, 1629, 1658, and 1664, testifying to its continuing popularity – meant that by the time of the Civil War, this hostile portrait of Eleanor was probably more-widely known than the positive depictions by Camden and Hollingshed. The loss of most of the crosses can be documented or inferred to have occurred between 1643 and 1646, Civil War years during which religious monuments that reflected elements of Catholic practices were targeted for destruction; for example, Parliament's Committee for the Demolition of Monuments of Superstition and Idolatry ordered the removal of the Charing Cross in 1643. Eleanor's reputation began to become more positive following the 1643 publication of Sir Richard Baker's A History of the Kings of England, which retold the myth of Eleanor saving her husband at Acre. Thereafter, Eleanor's reputation was largely positive and ultimately derived from Camden, whose work was uncritically repeated by historians. In the 19th century the self-styled historian Agnes Strickland used Camden to write the most-positive account of Eleanor. None of these writers used contemporaneous chronicles or records to provide accurate information about Eleanor's life.

Such documents began to become widely available in the late 19th century, but when historians began to cite them to suggest Eleanor was not the perfect queen Strickland depicted, many rejected the correction and frequently expressed indignant disbelief anything negative was said about Eleanor. Although historians now more commonly study queenship in its own right and regard medieval queens as worthy of attention, the study of consorts remains uneven; however, Eleanor of Castile's career can today be examined as the achievement of an intelligent and determined woman who was able to meet the challenges of a demanding life, though her qualities were often expressed in unpleasant or controversial ways.

== Issue ==
1. Stillborn daughter (29 May 1255)
2. Katherine (c. 1264 – 5 September 1264), buried in Westminster Abbey.
3. Joanna (January 1265 – before 7 September 1265), buried in Westminster Abbey.
4. John (13 July 1266 – 3 August 1271), died at Wallingford, in the custody of his granduncle, Richard, Earl of Cornwall. Buried in Westminster Abbey.
5. Henry (before 6 May 1268 – 16 October 1274), buried in Westminster Abbey.
6. Eleanor (18 June 1269 – 29 August 1298). She was betrothed to Alfonso III of Aragon, who died in 1291 before the marriage could take place, and in 1293, she married Count Henry III of Bar, by whom she had three children.
7. Daughter (1271 Palestine). Some sources call her Juliana, but there is no contemporary evidence for her name.
8. Joan (April 1272 – 7 April 1307). She married (1) in 1290 Gilbert de Clare, 6th Earl of Hertford, who died in 1295, and (2) in 1297 Ralph de Monthermer, 1st Baron Monthermer. She had four children by each marriage.
9. Alphonso (24 November 1273 – 19 August 1284), Earl of Chester.
10. Margaret (15 March 1275 – after 1333). In 1290, she married John II of Brabant, who died in 1318. They had one son.
11. Berengaria (1 May 1276 – before 27 June 1278), buried in Westminster Abbey.
12. Daughter (3 January 1278) probably stillborn.
13. Mary (11 March 1279 – 29 May 1332), a Benedictine nun in Amesbury.
14. Son (c. 1280)
15. Elizabeth (7 August 1282 – 5 May 1316). She married (1) in 1297 John I, Count of Holland, (2) in 1302 Humphrey de Bohun, 4th Earl of Hereford and 3rd Earl of Essex. The first marriage was childless; by Bohun, Elizabeth had ten children.
16. Edward II of England, also known as Edward of Caernarvon (25 April 1284 – 21 September 1327). In 1308, he married Isabella of France. They had four children.

== Sources ==
- Alexander, Jonathan; Binski, Paul, eds. (1987). "The Eleanor crosses". Age of Chivalry: art in Plantagenet England, 1200–1400. London: Royal Academy of Arts. pp. 361–66. ISBN 9780297791904. OL 46862874M.
- Armstrong, A.S. (2023). "Eleanor of Castile: A Consort of Contradictions". In Norrie, A.; Harris, C.; Laynesmith, J.; Messer, D.R.; Woodacre, E (eds.). Norman to Early Plantagenet Consorts. Queenship and Power. Cham: Palgrave Macmillan. pp. 237–255. doi:10.1007/978-3-031-21068-6_13. ISBN 9783031210679. OL 40320999M.
- Carpenter, David (2004). The Struggle for Mastery: The Penguin History of Britain 1066–1284. London: Penguin. ISBN 9780140148244. OL 7348814M.
- Cocke, Thomas (1986). "The Architectural History at Lincoln Cathedral from the Dissolution to the Twentieth Century". In Heslop, T.A.; Sekules, V.A. (eds.). Medieval Art and Architecture at Lincoln Cathedral. British Archaeological Association. pp. 148–155. ISBN 9780907307143. OL 2443113M.
- Cockerill, Sara (2014). Eleanor of Castile: the shadow queen. Stroud: Amberley. ISBN 9781445635897. OL 28551635M.
- Davies, Joshua (2018). "Queen Eleanor and her crosses: Trauma and memory, medieval and modern". Visions and ruins. Manchester: Manchester University Press. doi:10.7765/9781526125941.00007. ISBN 9781526125934.
- Hilton, Lisa (2008). "Eleanor of Castile". Queens consort : the autobiography. London: Phoenix. ISBN 978-0-7538-2611-9. OCLC 359673870.
- Griffin, Eric (2015). "Copying "the Anti-Spaniard": Post-Armada Hispanophobia and English Renaissance Drama". In Fuchs, Barbara; Weissbourd, Emily (eds.). Representing Imperial Rivalry in the Early Modern Mediterranean. University of Toronto Press. ISBN 9781442649026. JSTOR 10.3138/j.ctt14bth82. OL 29255494M.
- Griffin, Eric J. (2009). English Renaissance Drama and the Specter of Spain: Ethnopoetics and Empire. University of Pennsylvania Press. ISBN 9780812241709. JSTOR j.ctt3fh8z6. OL 23081992M.
- Hamilton, B. (1995). "Eleanor of Castile and the Crusading Movement". Mediterranean Historical Review. 10 (1–2): 92–103. doi:10.1080/09518969508569686.
- Hamilton, J.S. (2010). The Plantagenets: History of a Dynasty. Continuum. ISBN 9781441157126. OL 28013041M.
- Hillaby, Joe (1994). "The ritual-child-murder accusation: its dissemination and Harold of Gloucester". Jewish Historical Studies. 34: 69–109. JSTOR 29779954.
- Hillaby, Joe; Hillaby, Caroline (2013). The Palgrave Dictionary of Medieval Anglo-Jewish History. Basingstok: Palgrave Macmillan. ISBN 9780230278165. OL 28086241M.
- Huscroft, Richard (2006). Expulsion: England's Jewish solution. Stroud: Tempus. ISBN 9780752437293. OL 7982808M.
- Morris, Marc (2009). A Great and Terrible King: Edward I and the Forging of Britain. London: Windmill Books. ISBN 9780099481751. OL 22563815M.
- Norrie, A. (2023). "Preface". In Norrie, A.; Harris, C.; Laynesmith, J.; Messer, D.R.; Woodacre, E (eds.). Norman to Early Plantagenet Consorts. Queenship and Power. Cham: Palgrave Macmillan. pp. xxi–xxiii. doi:10.1007/978-3-031-21068-6_13. ISBN 9783031210679. OL 40320999M.
- Parsons, John Carmi (1984). "The Year of Eleanor of Castile's Birth and Her Children by Edward I". Mediaeval Studies. 46: 245–265. doi:10.1484/J.MS.2.306316. esp. 246 n. 3.
  —— (1995). Eleanor of Castile: Queen and Society in Thirteenth Century England. St. Martin's Press. ISBN 0312086490. OL 3502870W.
  —— (1998). "Que nos lactauit in infancia': The Impact of Childhood Care-givers on Plantagenet Family Relationships in the Thirteenth and Early Fourteenth Centuries". In Rousseau and, Constance M.; Rosenthal, Joel T. (eds.). Women, Marriage, and Family in Medieval Christendom: Essays in Memory of Michael M. Sheehan, C.S.B. Kalamazoo. pp. 289–324. ISBN 9781879288652. OL 12116082M.
  —— (2004). "Eleanor [Eleanor of Castile]". Oxford Dictionary of National Biography (online ed.). Oxford University Press. doi:10.1093/ref:odnb/8619. (Subscription, Wikipedia Library access or UK public library membership required.)
- Powicke, Frederick Maurice (1991). The Thirteenth Century, 1216–1307. Oxford University Press. ISBN 0192852493. OL 1533879M.
- Powrie, Jean (1990). Eleanor of Castile. Studley: Brewin Books. ISBN 0947731792. OL 1307649M.
- Prestwich, Michael (1988). Edward I. Yale University Press.
- Reynolds, Gordon (2023). "Proxy over Pilgrimage: Queen Eleanor of Castile and the Celebration of Crusade upon her Funerary Monument(s)". Peregrinations. 8 (4): 117–39.
- Rokéah, Zefira Entin (1988). "Money and the hangman in late thirteenth century England: Jews, Christians and coinage offences alleged and real (Part I)". Jewish Historical Studies. 31: 83–109. JSTOR 29779864.
- Stacey, Robert C. (1997). "Parliamentary Negotiation and the Expulsion of the Jews from England". In Prestwich, Michael; Britnell, Richard H.; Frame, Robin (eds.). Thirteenth Century England: Proceedings of the Durham Conference, 1995. Vol. 6. Woodbridge: Boydell Press. pp. 77–102. ISBN 9780851156743. OL 11596429M.
  —— (2001). "Anti-Semitism and the Medieval English State". In Maddicott, J. R.; Pallister, D. M. (eds.). The Medieval State: Essays Presented to James Campbell. London: The Hambledon Press. pp. 163–77. ISBN 9781852851958. OL 8976316M.
- Stocker, David (1986). "The Shrine of Little St Hugh". In Heslop, T.A.; Sekules, V.A. (eds.). Medieval Art and Architecture at Lincoln Cathedral. British Archaeological Association. pp. 109–117. ISBN 9780907307143. OL 2443113M.
- Stevenson, W. H. (1 January 1888). "The Death of Queen Eleanor of Castile". The English Historical Review. 3 (10): 315–318. JSTOR 546367.
- Stokes, H. P. (1915). "The relationship between the Jews and the Royal family of England in the Thirteenth century". Transactions of the Jewish Historical Society of England. 8. Jewish Historical Society of England: 153–170. JSTOR 29777686.
- Tolan, John (2023). England's Jews: Finance, Violence, and the Crown in the Thirteenth Century. Philadelphia: University of Pennsylvania Press. ISBN 9781512823899. OL 39646815M.

Eleanor of Castile Castilian House of Ivrea Cadet branch of the House of Ivrea Born: 1241 Died: 28 November 1290
English royalty
Vacant Title last held by Eleanor of Provence	Queen consort of England; 20 November 1272 – 28 November 1290	Vacant Title next held by Margaret of France
Regnal titles
Preceded by Joan	Countess of Ponthieu; 1279–1290 with Edward I	Succeeded by Edward II
