= Hertog Jan =

Dutch brewery

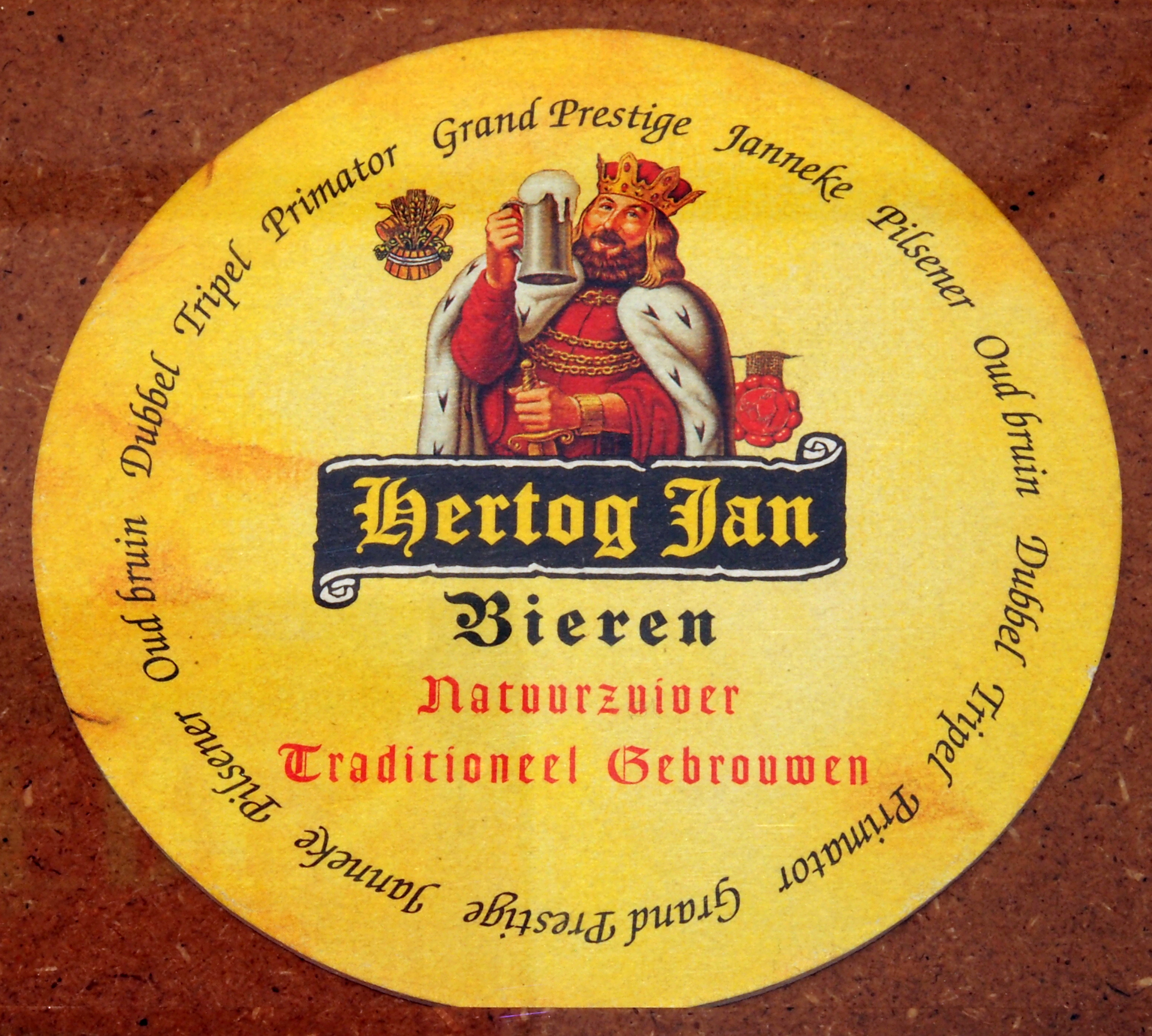
Hertog Jan Bieren beermat

Hertog Jan (Dutch pronunciation: [ˈɦɛrtɔx ˈjɑn]) is a brewery in the Netherlands. Originally Hertog Jan was a brand only, owned by distributor De Kikvorsch in Deest. Under this brand several types of beer were released, of which the top-fermenting beers were all made at the Arcense Stoombierbrouwerij in Arcen. In the early 1980s the brewery had played a major role in the revival of beer culture in the Netherlands. In 1995 it became part of the international Interbrew (later InBev, now Anheuser–Busch InBev) group and in 1998 was renamed to Hertog Jan Brouwerij. The brewery is named after John I, Duke of Brabant.

== Beers ==
The brewery produces several styles of beer under this name such as a pilsner, seasonal varieties and a barrel-aged beer called Hertog Jan Grand Prestige. Since 2017, Hertog Jan has launched an annual special edition beer called Hertog Jan Grand Prestige Vatgerijpt. Each edition has a different theme which is focused around the barrels the beer is aged in.

The logo has always included an illustration of John I, Duke of Brabant. The latest version of the logo was designed by UK branding agency Osborne Pike.
