= Henry III of Brabant =

Dutch noble (1231–1261)

Henry III
- Duke of Brabant; Duke of Lothier; Imperial Vicar
- Henry III in the Chansonnier du Roi
- Born: 1230
- Died: 28 February 1261 (aged 30–31); Leuven
- Buried: Dominican Church, Leuven
- Noble family: House of Reginar
- Spouse: Adelaide of Burgundy
- Issue: Henry IV, Duke of Brabant; John I, Duke of Brabant; Godfrey, Lord of Aarschot; Marie of Brabant, Queen of France
- Father: Henry II, Duke of Brabant
- Mother: Marie of Hohenstaufen

Henry III of Brabant (c. 1230 – 28 February 1261, Leuven) was Duke of Brabant between 1248 and his death. He was the son of Henry II of Brabant and Marie of Hohenstaufen. He was also a trouvère.

The disputed territory of Lothier, the former Duchy of Lower Lorraine, was assigned to him by the King Alfonso X of Castile, a claimant to the German throne. Alfonso also appointed him imperial vicar to advance his claims on the Holy Roman Empire.

In 1251, he married Adelaide of Burgundy (c. 1233 – 23 October 1273), daughter of Hugh IV, Duke of Burgundy and Yolande de Dreux, by whom he had four children:

1. Henry IV, Duke of Brabant (c. 1251 – aft. 1272) Mentally disabled, and made to abdicate in favor of his brother John on 24 May 1267.
2. John I, Duke of Brabant (1253–1294) Married first to Marguerite of France, daughter of King Louis IX of France (Saint Louis) and his wife Margaret of Provence, and later to Margaret of Flanders, daughter of Guy, Count of Flanders and his first wife Mathilda of Béthune.
3. Godfrey of Brabant, Lord of Aarschot (d. 11 July 1302, Kortrijk), killed at the Battle of the Golden Spurs, married 1277 Jeanne Isabeau de Vierzon (d. aft. 1296)
4. Maria of Brabant (1256, Leuven – 12 January 1322, Murel), married at Vincennes on 27 August 1274 to King Philip III of France.

On 26 February 1261 Henry III signed his will, which included a clause threatening to banish Jewish people from Brabant unless they ceased the practice of usury, albeit only after his death. He died two days later. His wife Adelaide, acting as regent since Henry IV was incapable of ruling, never enforced this policy laid out in the will, and the Jews were able to stay.

== See also ==
- Dukes of Brabant family tree

== Sources ==
- Dunbabin, Jean (2011). The French in the Kingdom of Sicily, 1266–1305. Cambridge University Press.

Regnal titles
Preceded by Henry II	Duke of Brabant and Lothier; 1248–1261	Succeeded by Henry IV
