= John II of Brabant =

13th and 14th-century duke of Brabant

John II
- Duke of Brabant; Duke of Lothier; Duke of Limburg
- Born: 27 September 1275
- Died: 27 October 1312 (aged 37); Tervuren
- Burial: Brussels Cathedral
- Spouse: Margaret of England (m. 1290)
- Issue: John III, Duke of Brabant
- House: House of Reginar
- Father: John I, Duke of Brabant
- Mother: Margaret of Flanders

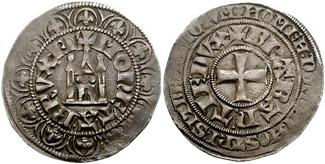
John II: Gros tournois.

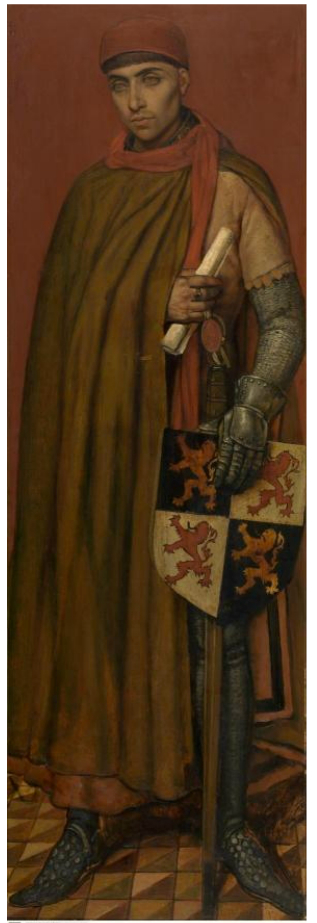
John II, Duke of Brabant, 1306 (1864-1869) by Belgian artist Jan August Hendrik Leys

John II (27 September 1275 – 27 October 1312), also called John the Peaceful, was Duke of Brabant, Lothier and Limburg (1294–1312). He was the son of John I of Brabant and Margaret of Flanders.

John II succeeded his father in 1294 During the reign of John II, Brabant continued supporting a coalition to stop French expansion. He tried to conquer South Holland (district of medieval Holland) from the pro-French Count John II of Holland, but was not successful.

In 1309, the Crusade of the Poor besieged the castle of Genappe in Brabant because it was sheltering Jews. John sent an army that defeated the Crusaders, who incurred heavy losses. According to Chris Harman (2000), during different parts of the XIV century several attacks on Jewish merchants and Christian priests took place, and also awhich, typically, masses of people would march from town to town, looting and being joined by others during their march. Harman quotes the following:

"Armed columns appeared, consisting of miserably poor artisans and labourers with an admixture of nobles who had squandered their wealth. These people begged and pillaged their way through the country, killing Jews but also storming…castles…In the end they attacked the castle of the Duke of Brabant…who three years before had routed an army of insurgent clothworkers and, it is said, buried its leaders alive." N. Cohn, The Pursuit of the Millennium. (London, 1970), p.102.

John, who suffered from kidney stones and wanted his duchy to be peacefully handed over to his son upon his death, in 1312 signed the famous Charter of Kortenberg. John died in Tervuren in 1312. He was buried in the Church of St. Michael and St. Gudula (now Brussels' cathedral).

== Family ==
On 8 July 1290, John married Margaret of England in Westminster Abbey, London. She was a daughter of King Edward I of England and his first wife, Eleanor of Castile. Only one child was born out of this marriage:

- John III, Duke of Brabant.

John II had several illegitimate children:

- Jan van Corsselaer, was later named Lord of Witthem, Wailwilre, Machelen, la Rochette and Colonster.
- Jan van Wyvliet. Lord of Blaesveld and Kuyc. Married to Margaret Pipenpoy.
- Jan Cordeken: Founder of the House of Glymes. He was legitimized by the emperor Louis IV by charter dated of 27 August 1344, lists John II as the father and Elisabeth Gortygin as his mother.
- Jan Magermann. Married to Adelise d'Elsies.
- Jan II van Dongelberg (- 1383). His mother was Marguerite van Pamel.

== Sources ==
- Prestwich, Michael (1997). Edward I. Yale University Press.
- Spencer, Andrew M. (2014). Nobility and Kingship in Medieval England. Cambridge University Press.
- Warnicke, Retha M. (2000). The Marrying of Anne of Cleves: Royal Protocol in Early Modern England. Cambridge University Press.
- Harman, C. (2000). A People's History of the World. Verso Books: London.

== See also ==
- Dukes of Brabant family tree

Regnal titles
| Preceded by John I | Duke of Brabant, Lothier, and Limburg; 1294–1312 | Succeeded by John III |
