= Adelaide of Burgundy, Duchess of Brabant =

Duchess of Brabant (1233–1273)

Adelaide of Burgundy
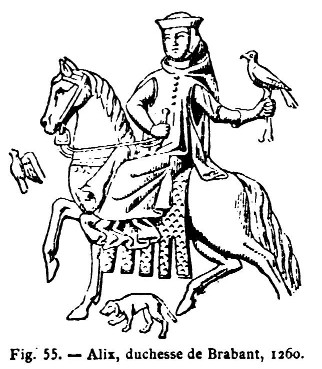
- Adelaide of Burgundy on horseback (1260)
- Born: c. 1233
- Died: 23 October 1273
- Noble family: Burgundy
- Spouse: Henry III, Duke of Brabant
- Issue: Henry IV, Duke of Brabant; John I, Duke of Brabant; Godfrey, Lord of Aarschot; Marie of Brabant, Queen of France
- Father: Hugh IV, Duke of Burgundy
- Mother: Yolande of Dreux

Adelaide of Burgundy (c. 1233 – 23 October 1273) was a daughter of Hugh IV, Duke of Burgundy by his first wife Yolande of Dreux. Alternatively, she was known as Alice (French) or Aleidis (Dutch). She was Duchess of Brabant as a result of her marriage to Henry III, Duke of Brabant in 1251 and would act as regent of the Duchy following the death of her husband a decade later.

== Biography ==
=== Marriage and motherhood ===
Adelaide was one of ten children from her father's two marriages. In 1251, she married Henry III, Duke of Brabant.

Adelaide and Henry had:

- Henry (c. 1251 – aft. 1272)
- John (1253 – 1294)
- Godfrey (died 1302)
- Marie (1256 – 1321), married Philip III of France

=== Regency ===
Upon the premature death of Henry in 1261, Adelaide assumed the regency on behalf of her underage son Henry. This arrangement was not accepted by all of the nobles at first as she faced opposition from Hendrik van Leuven of Gaasbeek, who was a cousin of her husband. Despite this, she maintained her position until her son John came of age in 1268.

One notable event of the regency was the change of Duke in 1267. Adelaide's eldest son, Henry, had physical and mental disabilities which rendered him incapable of effectively ruling the duchy upon his majority. As a result, it was decided that the adolescent was to be removed from the position and be replaced by Adelaide's second son, John. Henry would go on to become a novice in Saint Bénigne Abbey in Dijon.

It has been argued by historians such as H. Pirenne and B. Blumenkranz that Thomas Aquinas addressed his Epistola ad ducissam Brabantiae to Adelaide after she wrote to him, asking for counsel in regards to her Jewish subjects. In his final will and testament, her husband Henry had ordered for the expulsion of all usurers such as Jews and Cahorsins. In addition, Henry claimed that his Christian subjects should be freed from exactions. Although the then unknown Aquinas makes no explicit mention of Henry or his will and testament, his Epistola addresses how Adelaide should go about the matters raised by Henry. The work was only a minor treatise of Aquinas's; however, it has proven significant with historians of antisemitism and taxation during the Medieval era, the two areas of concern. He suggested that Adelaide should tax Jews to a certain extent and make them wear recognition signs. Historians such as Raymond van Uytven doubt that the similarities between the two documents are a coincidence, implying that Adelaide related her late husband's concerns to the theologian. Despite asking for Aquinas's advice, Adelaide never attempted to pursue her husband's demands.

Adelaide founded the Château of Val-Duchesse priory for women in 1262. The name means Valley of the Duchess. It was the first priory for women in the Low Countries that followed the rule of Saint Dominic.

In 1268, Adelaide handed over the reins of government to John, and died five years later at roughly aged forty.

== Gallery ==
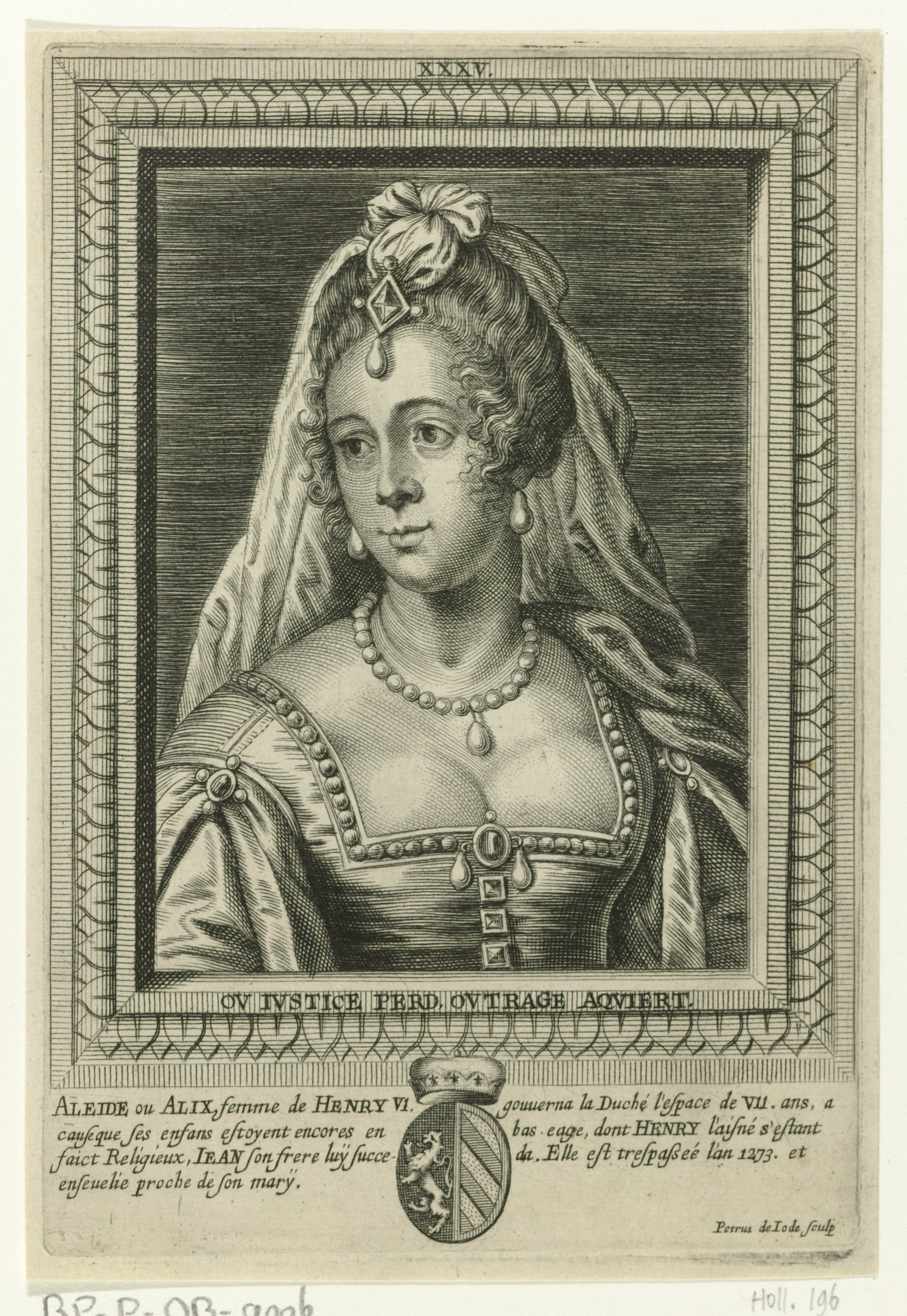
Posthumous engraving of Duchess Adelaide by Pieter de Jode II (dated 1661–1663)

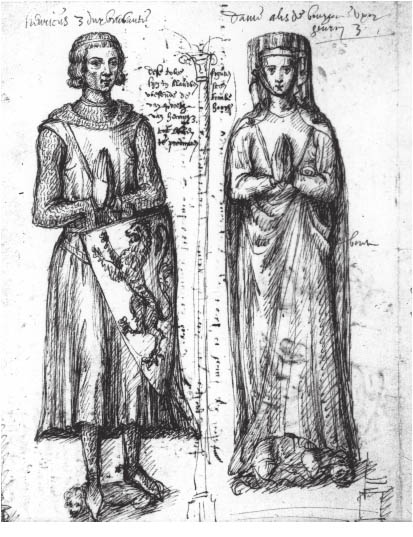
Sketching of Adelaide and her husband

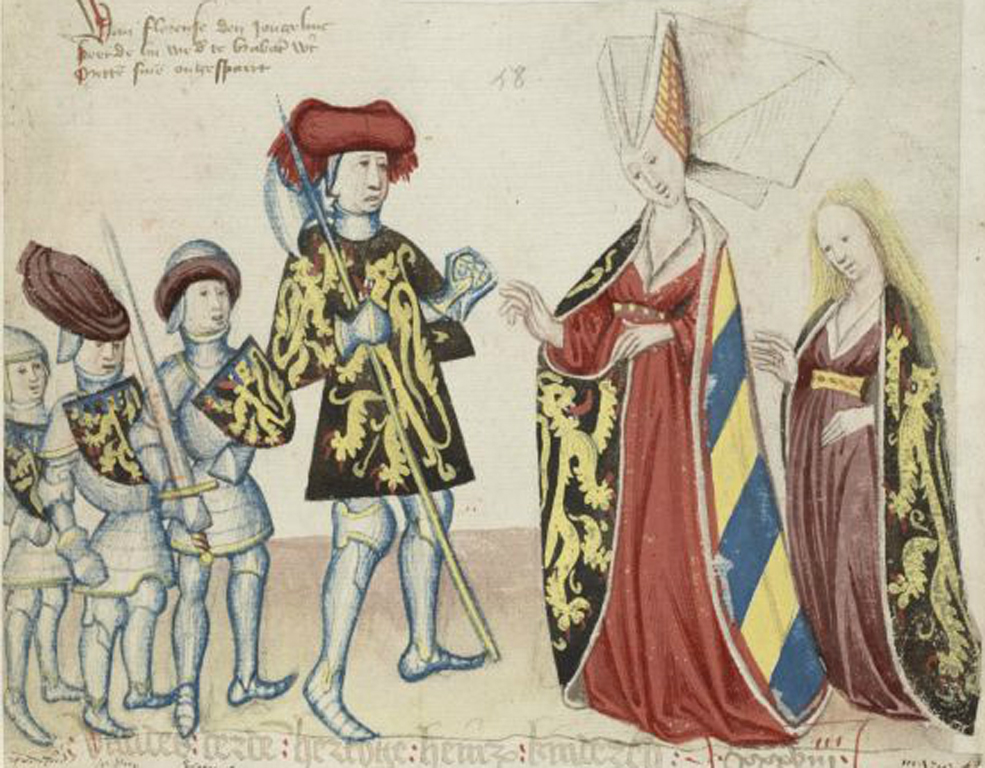
Adelaide with her husband and four children by Jan van Boendale

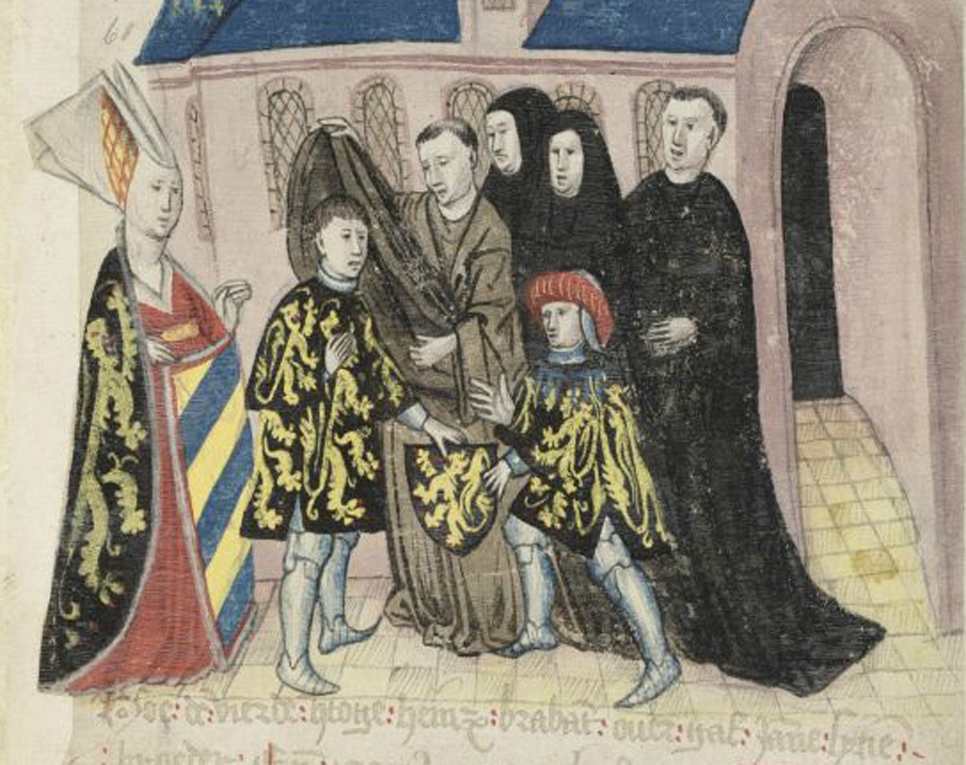
Adelaide is present as young Henry IV enters the religious life and is replaced as Duke by John (van Boendale).

== Sources ==
- Commire, Anne (1999). Women in World History: Aak-Azz. Yorkin Publications.
- Dunbabin, Jean (2011). The French in the Kingdom of Sicily, 1266–1305. Cambridge University Press.
- Previtê, C.W. (1960). The Shorter Cambridge Medieval History. Vol. II. Cambridge at the University Press.
- van Uytven, R. (1983). "The Date of Thomas Aquinas's Epistola ad ducissam Brabantiae". In Lievens, R.; van Mingroot, E.; Verbeke, W. (eds.). Pascua Mediaevalia. Leuven University Press.
