= John I of Brabant =

Duke of Brabant (1252/53 – 1294)

John I
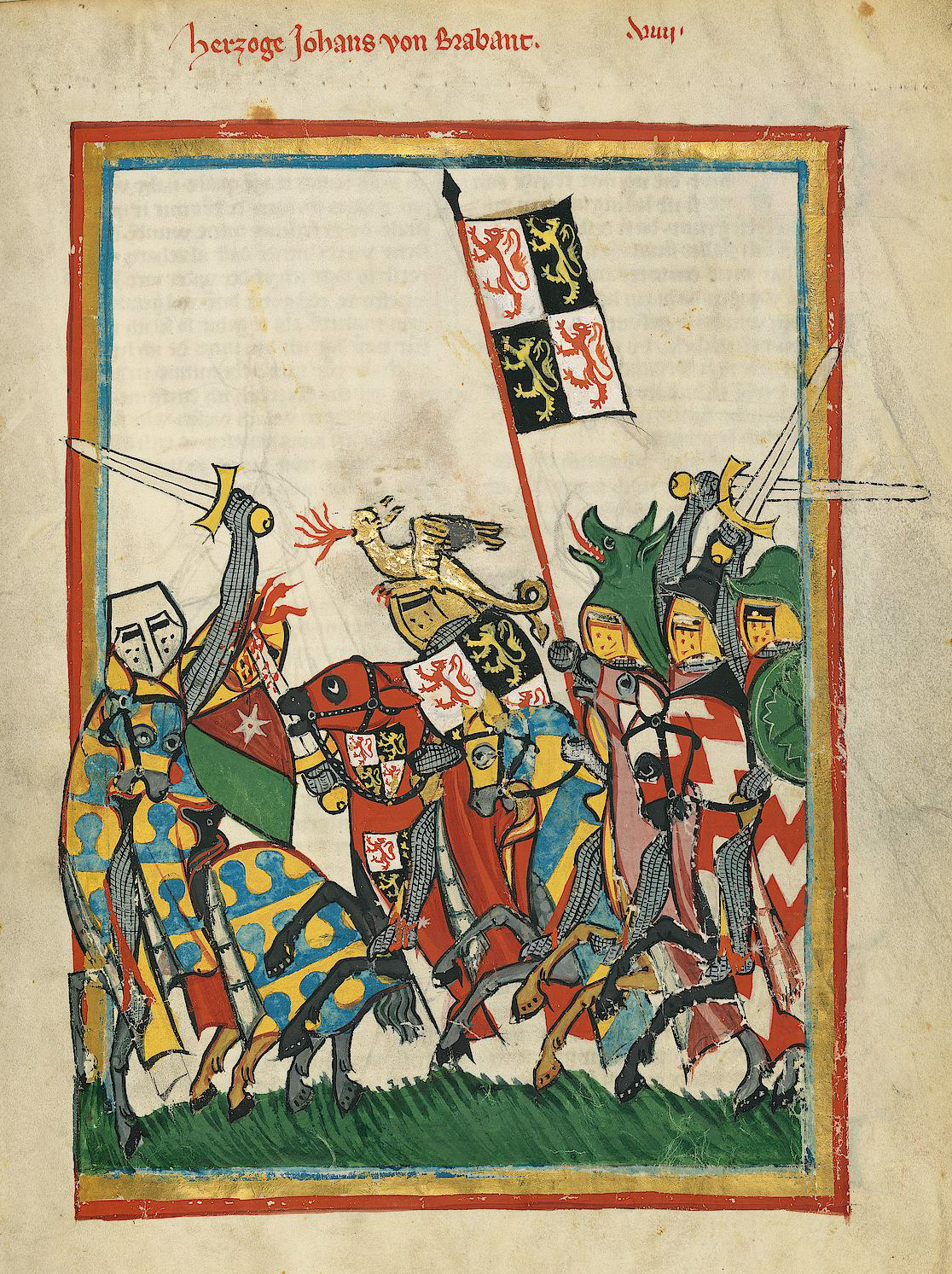
- John going to battle, from the Codex Manesse

Duke of Brabant and Lothier
- Reign: 1267–1294
- Predecessor: Henry
- Successor: John II

Duke of Limburg
- Reign: 1288–1294
- Predecessor: Reginald I of Guelders
- Successor: John II
- Born: 1252
- Died: 3 May 1294 (aged 41–42)
- Burial: Franciscan Church, Brussels
- Spouses: Margaret of France (m. 1270; died 1271) Margaret of Flanders (m. 1273; died 1285)
- Issue: John II, Duke of Brabant; Margaret, German Queen; Marie, Countess of Savoy
- House: House of Reginar
- Father: Henry III, Duke of Brabant
- Mother: Adelaide of Burgundy
- Coat of arms

John I, also called John the Victorious (1252/53 – 3 May 1294) was Duke of Brabant (1267–1294), Lothier and Limburg (1288–1294). During the 13th century, John I was venerated as a folk hero. He has been painted as the perfect model of a brave, adventurous and chivalrous feudal prince.

== Life ==
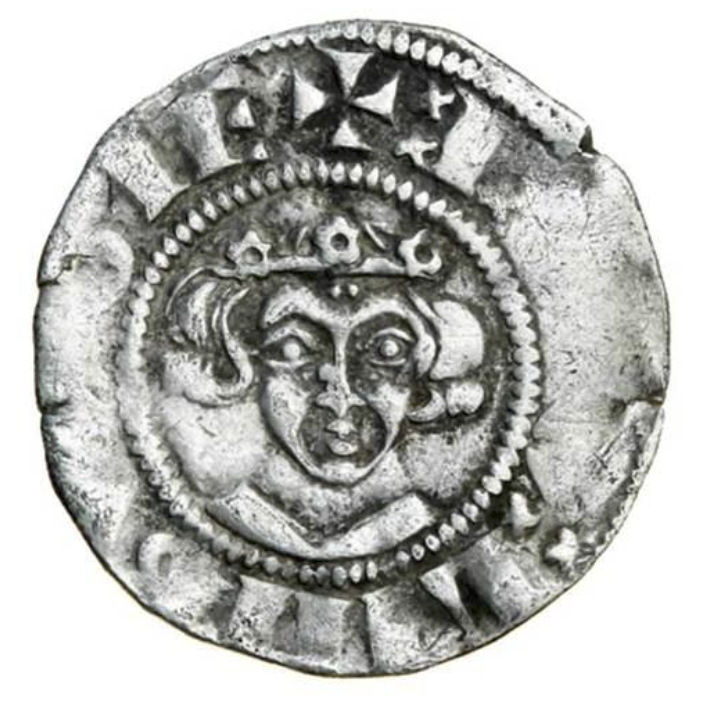
John I's effigy on a silver coin. Struck in Brussels or Leuven during his reign.

Born in Leuven, he was the son of Henry III, Duke of Brabant and Aleidis of Burgundy, daughter of Hugh IV, Duke of Burgundy. He was also an older brother of Maria of Brabant, Queen consort of Philip III of France. In 1267 his older brother Henry IV, Duke of Brabant, being mentally deficient, was deposed in his favour.

John's greatest military victory was the Battle of Worringen 1288, by which John I came to reign over the Duchy of Limburg. He was completely outnumbered in forces but led the successful invasion into the Rhineland to defeat the confederacy. In 1288 Limburg was formally attached to Brabant.

He was popular in the Middle Ages for poetry and literature. Even today there exists an ode to him, so well known that it was a potential candidate to be the North Brabant anthem. He was also famous for his many illegitimate children.

On 3 May 1294 at some marriage festivities at Bar-le-Duc, John I was mortally wounded in the arm in an encounter by Pierre de Bausner. He was buried in the church of the Order of Friars Minor (Minderbroederskerk) in Brussels, but since the Protestant iconoclasm (Beeldenstorm) in 1566, nothing remains of his tomb.

== Family and children ==
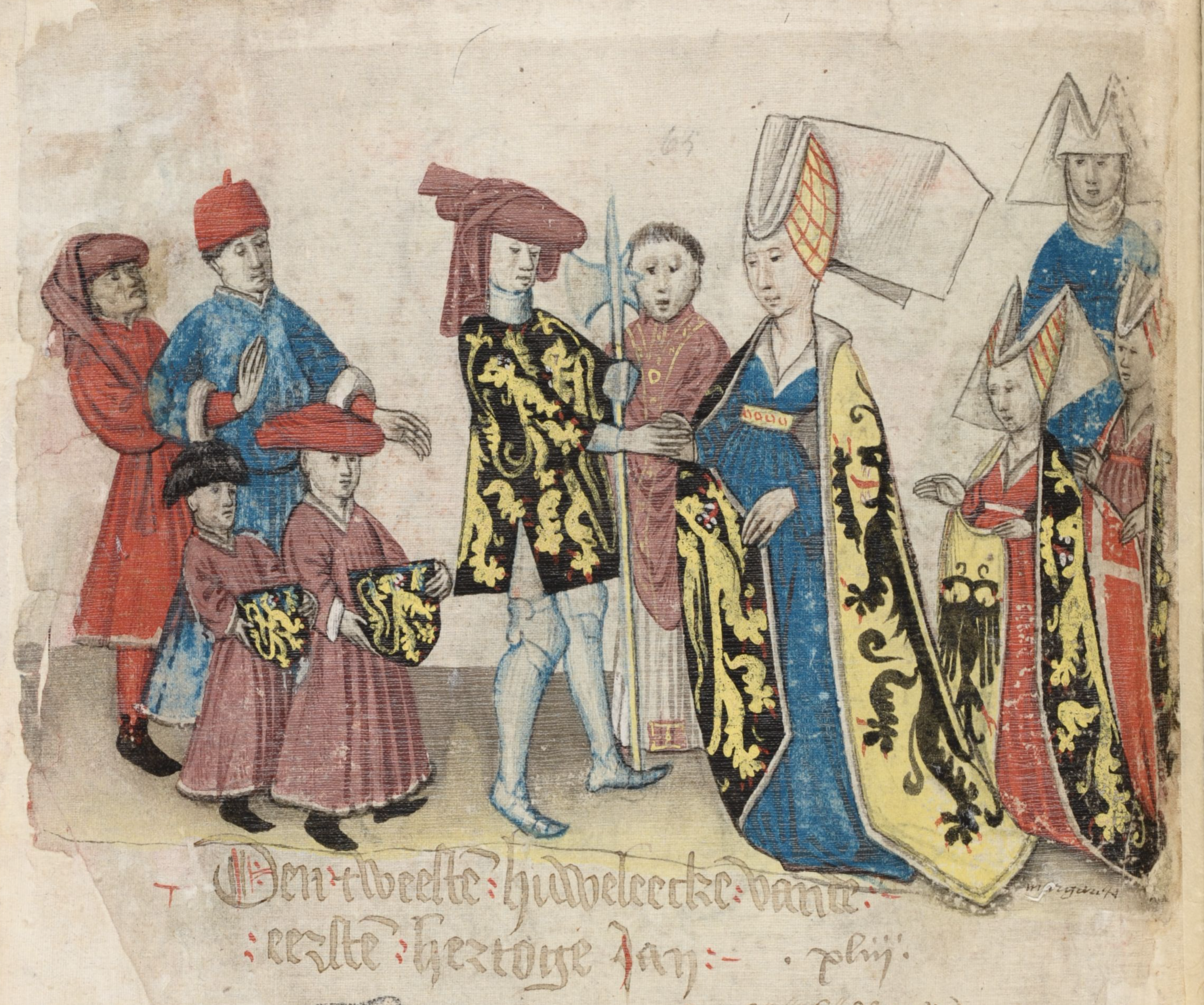
Marriage of John and Margaret of Flanders from the Chronicle Brabantse Yeesten by Jan Van Boendaele.

John was married twice. On 5 September 1270, he married Margaret, daughter of Louis IX of France and Margaret of Provence. They had a son, but both mother and child died shortly after his birth.

In 1273, John married Margaret (d. 3 July 1285), daughter of Guy, Count of Flanders and had the following children:

1. Godfrey (1273/74 – aft. 13 September 1283).
2. John II of Brabant (1275–1312), married 8 July 1290 to Margaret of England.
3. Margaret (4 October 1276 – 14 December 1311, Genoa), married 9 July 1292 to Henry VII, Holy Roman Emperor.
4. Marie (d. after 2 December 1338), married to Count Amadeus V of Savoy.

John I had several illegitimate children:

1. Gillis van der Balcht
2. Jean Meuwe, Seigneur of Wavre and Dongelberg.
3. Margareta of Tervuren, she was married on 2 March 1292 to Jean de Rode de Lantwyck
4. Jan Pylyser (1272–1342)
5. Jan van der Plasch

== Legacy ==
The duke is remembered in the folkish song Harbalorifa that remains popular. The popular Dutch beer Hertog Jan was named after the duke. Also the beer Primus of the Haacht Brewery is named after John I (Jan Primus).

== Ancestry ==
Ancestors of John I of Brabant

8. Henry I, Duke of Brabant
4. Henry II, Duke of Brabant
9. Matilda of Flanders
2. Henry III, Duke of Brabant
10. Philip of Swabia
5. Marie of Swabia
11. Irene Angelina
1. John I, Duke of Brabant
12. Odo III, Duke of Burgundy
6. Hugh IV, Duke of Burgundy
13. Alice of Vergy
3. Adelaide of Burgundy
14. Robert III, Count of Dreux
7. Yolande of Dreux
15. Aenor of Saint-Valéry

== See also ==
- Dukes of Brabant family tree
- Hertog Jan

== Bibliography ==
- Appelmans, Janick (2005). "The Abbey of Affligem and the Emergence of a Historiographic Tradition in Brabant (1268–1322)". In Milis, Ludovicus; Verbeke, Werner; Goossens, Jean (eds.). Medieval Narrative Sources: A Gateway Into the Medieval Mind. Leuven University Press.
- Dunbabin, Jean (2011). The French in the Kingdom of Sicily, 1266–1305. Cambridge University Press.
- Richard, Jean (1992). Lloyd, Simon (ed.). Saint Louis: Crusader King of France. Translated by Birrell, Jean. Cambridge University Press.
- Verbruggen, J.F. (2002). DeVries, Kelly (ed.). The Battle of the Golden Spurs (Courtrai, 11 July 1302). Translated by Ferguson, David Richard. Boydell Press.
- H. Barlandus, Rerum gestarum a Brabantiae ducibus historia usque in annum 1526 (Leuven, 1566)
- G. C. van der Berghe, Jean le Victorieux, duc de Brabant (1259–1294), (Leuven, 1857)
- K. F. Stallaert, Gesch. v. Jan I. van Braband en zijne tijdvak (Brussels, 1861)
- A. Wauters, Le Duc Jean I^{er} et le Brabant sous le règne de ce prince (Brussels, 1859)

Regnal titles
| Preceded by Henry IV | Duke of Brabant and Lothier; 1267–1294 | Succeeded by John II |
| Preceded by Reginald | Duke of Limburg; 1288–1294 | Succeeded by John II |
