= Henry IV of Brabant =

Duke of Brabant from 1261 to 1267

Henry IV
- Duke of Brabant; Duke of Lothier
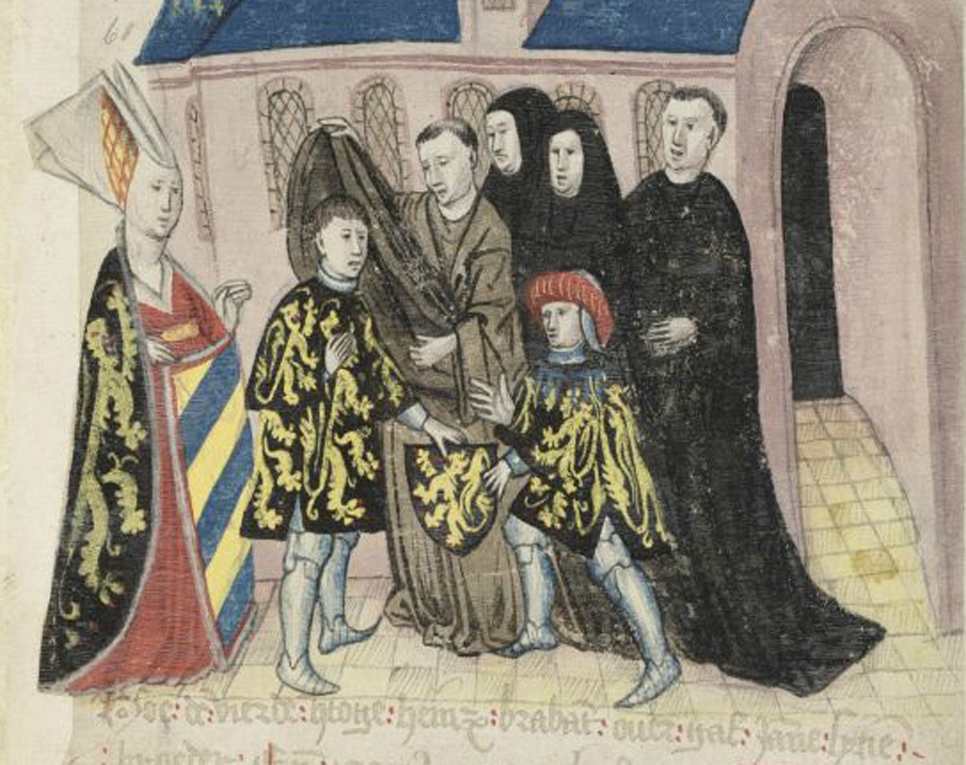
- Born: 1251
- Died: after 29 April 1272
- Noble family: House of Reginar
- Father: Henry III, Duke of Brabant
- Mother: Adelaide of Burgundy

Henry IV of Brabant (1251/1252 – after 29 April 1272) was Duke of Brabant from 1261 to 1267.

Born at Leuven, he was the eldest son of Henry III, Duke of Brabant, and Adelaide of Burgundy.

Succeeding his father at about the age of ten, he proved infirm of mind and body, and was deposed in 1267 in favor of his younger brother John I, Duke of Brabant. After being deposed, Henry became a novice in Saint Bénigne Abbey in Dijon.

It is unknown what happened to Henry after 1272. Some historians have speculated he may have been transferred from Saint Bénigne Abbey to a secluded monastic house in the Ardennes region. A fragmentary letter from 1281, preserved in the Cartulary of Orval Abbey, makes reference to a “Heinricus, formerly of highly estate, now in divine contemplation,” which some scholars have tentatively linked to the deposed duke.

Regnal titles
Preceded by Henry III	Duke of Brabant and Lothier; 1261–1267	Succeeded by John I
