= Margaret of England, Duchess of Brabant =

English princess (born 1275)

Margaret of England
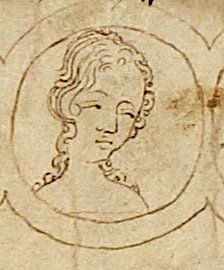
- Depiction of Margaret on the family tree

Duchess consort of Brabant, Lothier and Limburg
- Tenure: 3 May 1294 – 27 October 1312
- Born: 15 March 1275; Windsor Castle, Berkshire
- Died: aft. 1333 (aged c. 58); Belgium
- Burial: Cathedral of St. Michael and St. Gudula, Brussels
- Spouse: John II, Duke of Brabant (m. 1290; died 1312)
- Issue: John III, Duke of Brabant
- House: Plantagenet
- Father: Edward I of England
- Mother: Eleanor of Castile

Margaret of England (15 March 1275 – after 1333) was the tenth child and seventh daughter of King Edward I of England and his first wife, Eleanor of Castile. Her husband was John II, Duke of Brabant, whom she married in 1290, the year of her mother's death. Margaret and John had one child, John III, Duke of Brabant.

== Early life ==
Margaret was born on 15 March 1275, at Windsor Castle, the tenth child of King Edward I and his wife Eleanor of Castile.

Margaret's fifteen siblings included Joan of Acre, Eleanor, Countess of Bar, Elizabeth of Rhuddlan and her father's successor, Edward II of England.

== Duchess of Brabant ==
On 8 July 1290 Margaret married John II, Duke of Brabant in Westminster Abbey, London, becoming Duchess of Brabant less than four years later on 3 May 1294. She had been acquainted with her groom since childhood, as they had been betrothed in 1278 when she was three years old. Margaret's wedding festivities were splendidly extravagant; they included a procession of knights in full body armour and richly dressed ladies singing as they paraded through the streets of London to the music provided by harpers, minstrels and violinists, while fools danced. Their only child was John III, Duke of Brabant, successor to his father.

Margaret, described as having been a good-natured, merry child in her youth, was unhappy at the Brabant court, as she was forced to accept her husband's perennial succession of mistresses and the illegitimate children they bore him, all of whom were raised at court alongside her own son John. The latter was her only child, born 10 years into her marriage to the Duke.

During the reign of John II, Brabant continued supporting a coalition to stop French expansion. He tried to conquer South Holland from the pro-French count John II of Holland, but was not successful.

Margaret and John attended the wedding of her brother Edward to Isabella of France in Boulogne on 25 January 1308. They accompanied the royal pair to England for their joint coronation at Westminster Abbey the following month.

== Later life and death ==
John, who suffered from kidney stones and wanted his duchy to be peacefully handed over to his son upon his death, in 1312 signed the famous Charter of Kortenberg. Her son was a minor when he became Duke and a Regency was put in place. However, Margaret was not appointed to it; it was composed by count Greve Louis of Évreux, count Gerard V of Jülich and Floris Berthout.

Margaret died twenty-two years after her husband, during the reign of her nephew Edward III of England. She died in Brabant and was buried at the Cathedral of St. Michael and St. Gudula, Brussels. Her tomb and that of her husband have been destroyed.

== Ancestry ==
Ancestors of Margaret of England, Duchess of Brabant

8. John of England
4. Henry III of England
9. Isabella of Angoulême
2. Edward I of England
10. Ramon Berenguer IV, Count of Provence
5. Eleanor of Provence
11. Beatrice of Savoy
1. Margaret of England
12. Alfonso IX of León
6. Ferdinand III of Castile
13. Berengaria of Castile
3. Eleanor of Castile
14. Simon de Dammartin
7. Joan of Ponthieu
15. Marie of Ponthieu
