= Margaret of Flanders, Duchess of Brabant =

13th-century Flemish noblewoman

Margaret of Flanders
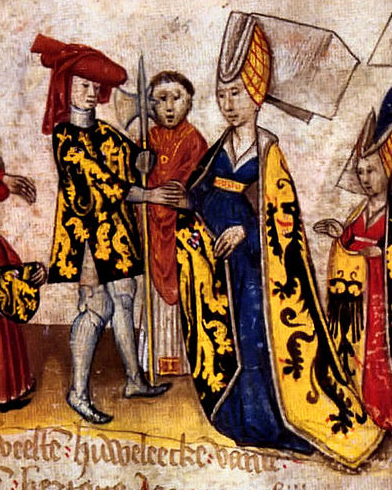
- John I, Duke of Brabant and his wife Margaret of Flanders
- Born: c. 1251
- Died: 3 July 1285
- Noble family: House of Dampierre
- Spouse: John I, Duke of Brabant
- Issue: Godfrey; John II, Duke of Brabant; Margaret of Brabant
- Father: Guy of Dampierre
- Mother: Matilda of Béthune

Margaret of Flanders (died 3 July 1285) was a Duchess consort of Brabant. She was the daughter of Guy of Dampierre and his first wife Matilda of Béthune.

Margaret married John I, Duke of Brabant in 1273. She was the mother of:

1. Godfrey (1273/74 – aft. 13 September 1283).
2. John II of Brabant (1275–1312).
3. Margaret of Brabant (4 October 1276 – 14 December 1311, Genoa), married 9 June 1292 to Henry VII, Holy Roman Emperor.
4. Marie (d. after 2 December 1338), married to Count Amadeus V of Savoy.

== Sources ==
- Verbruggen, J.F. (2002). DeVries, Kelly (ed.). The Battle of the Golden Spurs (Courtrai, 11 July 1302). Translated by Ferguson, David Richard. Boydell Press.
