= House of Croÿ =

Princely family from northern France

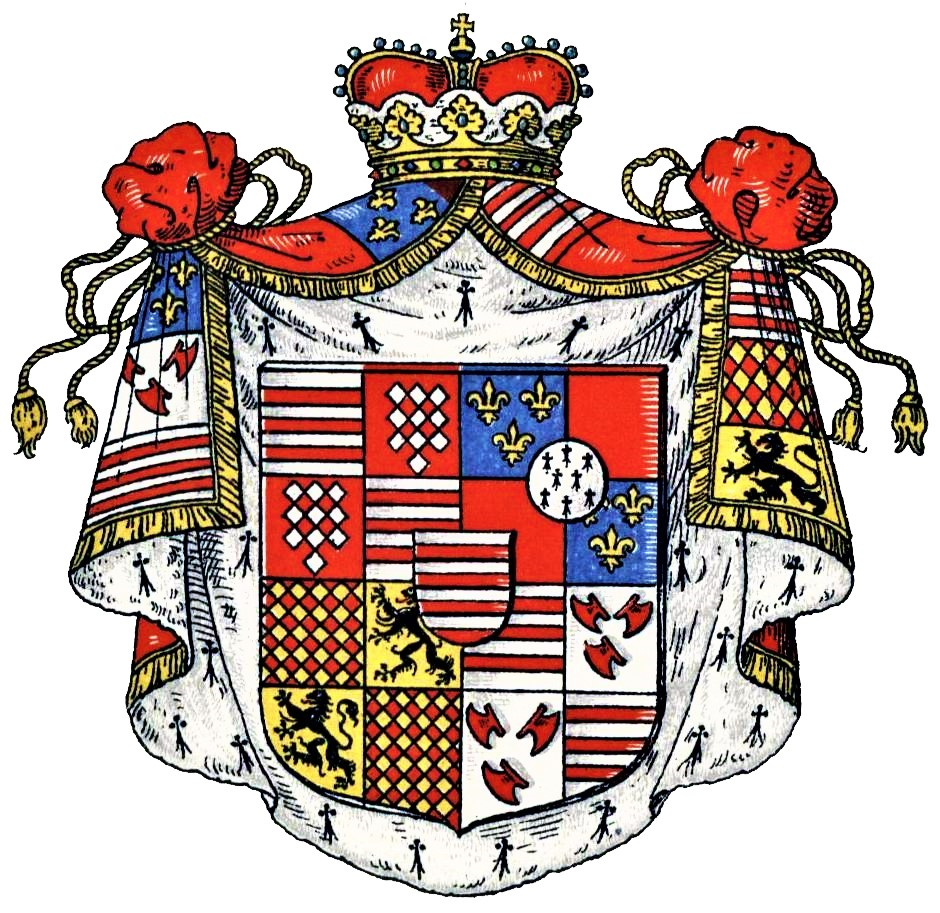
- Coat of arms of Croy family 1803
- Country: France Belgium; Holy Roman Empire Germany
- Founded: 1200; 826 years ago
- Current head: Rudolf, 15th Duke of Croy
- Titles: Duke of Croÿ; Prince of the Holy Roman Empire
- Estates: Chimay; Havre; Le Roelux; Dulmen; Haus Merfeld
- Cadet branches: Croy-Solre (extant)

The House of Croÿ (French pronunciation: [kʁwi]) is an old European noble family of princely and historically sovereign rank, which held a seat in the Imperial Diet from 1486, and was elevated to the rank of Princes of the Holy Roman Empire in 1594. In 1533 they became Dukes of Aarschot (in Belgium) and in 1598 Dukes of Croy in France. As a former ruling and mediatized family, it belongs to the Hochadel (high nobility). In 1913, the family had branches in Belgium, France, Austria and Prussia.

This dynastic house, which originally adopted its name from the Château de Crouy-Saint-Pierre in French Picardy, claimed descent from the Hungarian Prince Marc, (if true, he was likely a grandson of Prince Géza) who allegedly settled in France in 1147, where he married an heiress to the barony of Croÿ. The Croÿ family rose to prominence under the Dukes of Burgundy. Later, they became actively involved in the complex politics of France, Spain, Austria, and the Low Countries.

Among the known members of the House of Croÿ were two bishop-dukes of Cambrai, two cardinals (one being also the Archbishop of Toledo and another being the Archbishop of Rouen), five bishops (those of Thérouanne, Tournai, Cammin, Arras, and Ypres), one prime minister of Philip the Good, one finance minister, archchancellor, chief admiral, godfather and tutor of Holy Roman Emperor Charles V (himself godfather to another Croÿ), one Grand-Bouteiller, one Grand-Maitre and one Marshal of France; one Grand Equerry of the King of Spain, several imperial field marshals and twenty generals, four finance ministers of the Netherlands, two governors of the Netherlands and Belgium, one Russian field marshal; numerous ministers, ambassadors and senators in France, Austria, Belgium, and a record of thirty-two knights of the Order of the Golden Fleece.

The head of the house bears the title of duke, with all the other members titled as princes or princesses. All of them bear the predicate of Serene Highness.

== The Croÿs of Burgundy ==
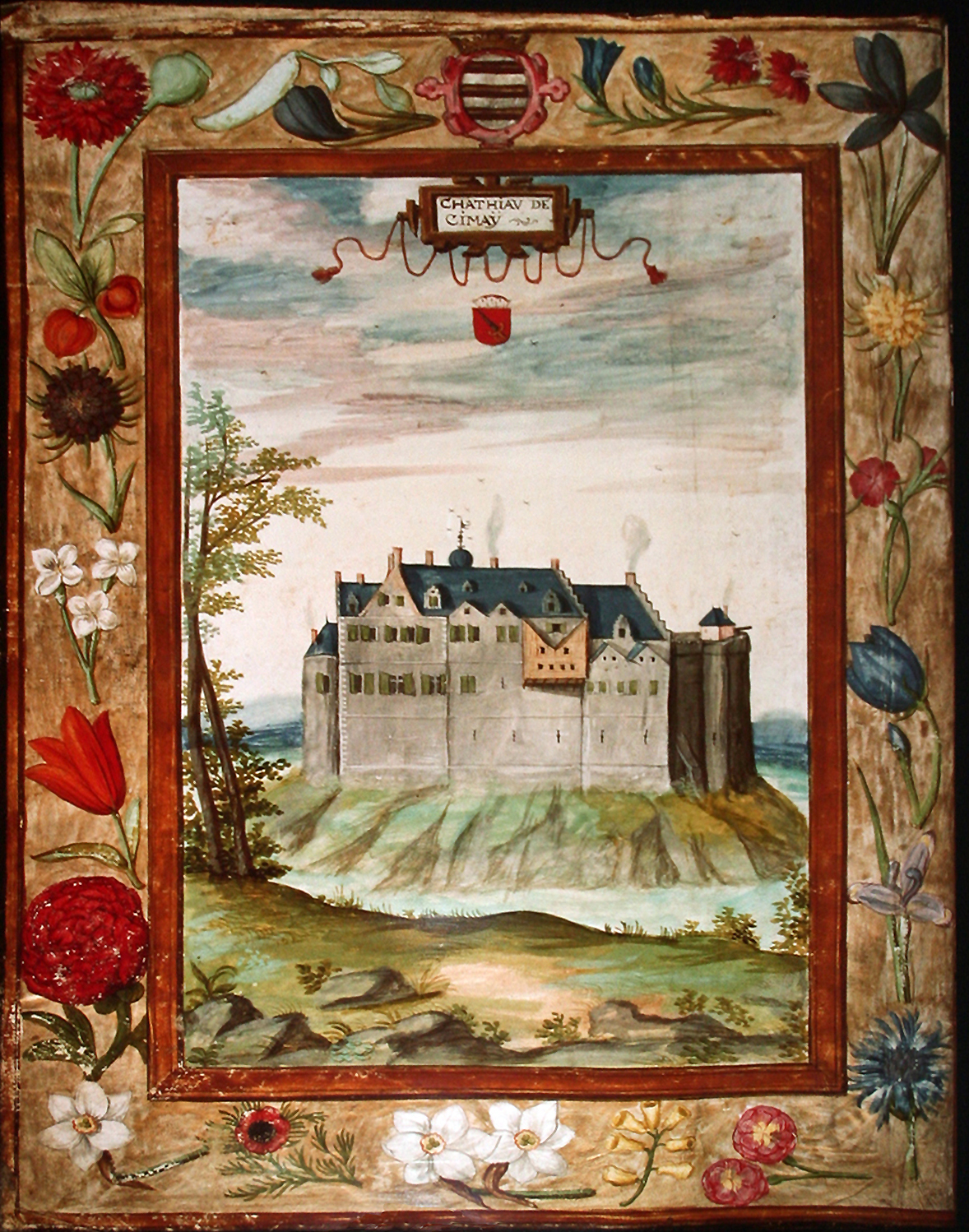
Chimay Castle.

Jean I de Croÿ was responsible for the ascendancy of his family to a position of supreme power in medieval Burgundy. He served Philip the Bold and his son John the Fearless in the capacity of councillor and chamberlain. In 1384 he married a wealthy heiress, Marie de Craon, successfully suing her first husband's family upon her death. In 1397, Jean acquired the lordship of Chimay, which was to become a core dominion of the Croÿ family. Four years later, he was appointed governor of Artois and led the ducal armies against the rebellious citizens of Liège. He was recorded as the Grand Bouteiller of the king of France in 1412 when he laid siege to Bourges. The following year, Isabeau of Bavaria had him apprehended and incarcerated in the castle of Montlhéry, whence he escaped. Jean, together with two of his sons, were killed in the Battle of Agincourt on 25 October 1415.

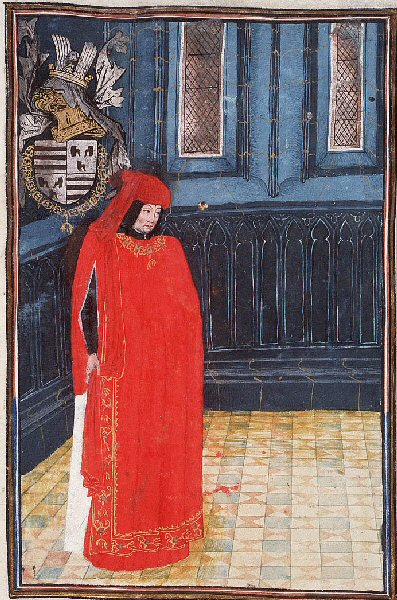
Antoine I le Grand, as represented on a miniature (ca. 1390)

Antoine I le Grand, Jean I's eldest surviving son and heir, was a key figure in 15th-century French politics. Securing for himself the post of governor general of the Netherlands and Luxembourg, he presided over the pro-French party at the court of Philip the Good and was one of the judges at the trial for treason in 1458 of Duke of Alençon. Like his father, he led French and Burgundian armies against Liège and distinguished himself at the Battle of Brouwershaven fighting against the English. While on a mission to the court of the Duke of Berry, he was implicated in the assassination of Louis de Valois, Duke of Orléans and as a consequence suffered torture in the Château de Blois.

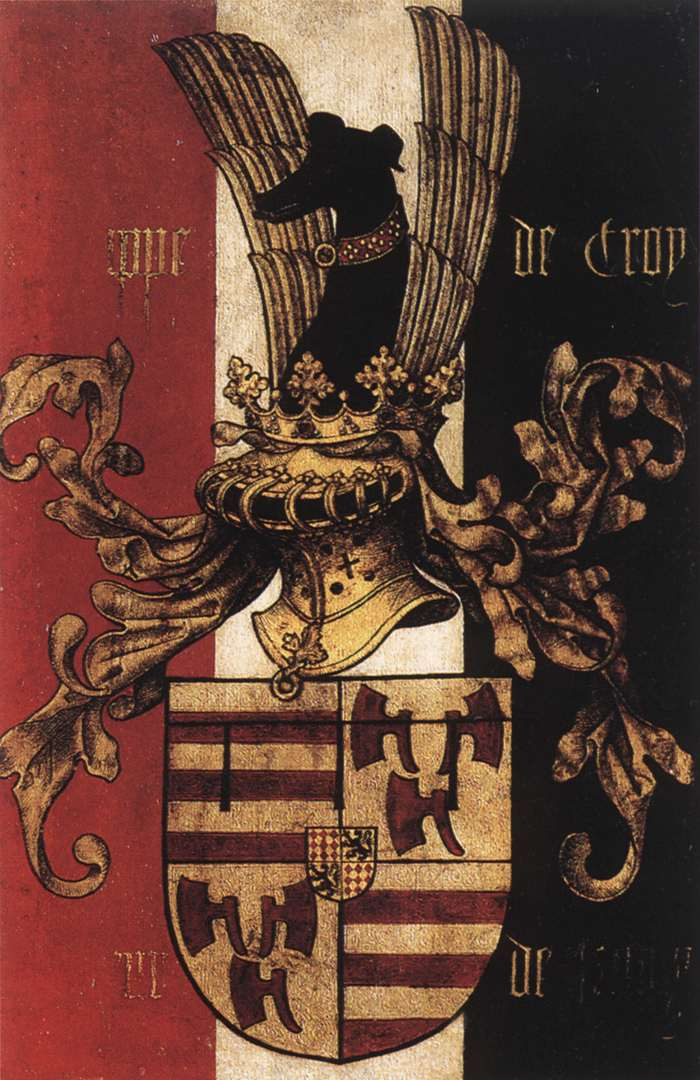
Arms of Philippe I de Croÿ, detail of Rogier's diptych (ca. 1460)

Having extricated himself from this predicament, Antoine used his power to expand his family's possessions: in 1429 he obtained the lordship of Le Rœulx; three years later he married a princess of Lorraine, who brought Aarschot to his family as her dowry; in 1446 he purchased the Château de Montcornet and completely rebuilt it. In 1438 he acquired the castle of Porcien and was made Count of Porcéan and Guînes by Charles VII in 1455. A year earlier, he had married his daughter to Count Palatine Louis I of Pfalz-Zweibrücken in order to increase his influence in the orbit of the Holy Roman Empire.

With Charles the Bold, the future Duke of Burgundy, he was at loggerheads, especially after they clashed over the inheritance of Jeanne d'Harcourt, Countess of Namur. Upon Charles's accession, Antoine was accused of plotting with astrologers to bring about the Duke's downfall and was compelled to flee to France. In France he took part in the coronation of Louis XI and was chosen as a godfather to the future Louis XII. It was not until the age of 83 that he reconciled himself with Charles and was allowed to reclaim his properties in Burgundy. He died either in 1475 or 1477 and was interred in Porcien.

Agnes de Croÿ was his sister and the mistress of Duke John the Fearless, by whom she had a natural son, the future bishop of Cambrai and archbishop of Trier. Several noble families of Belgium and the Netherlands descend from this prelate's eleven illegitimate children.

The lines of Croÿ-Arschot-Havré and Croÿ-Rœulx stem from Antoine's two sons, Philippe I and Jean III, while his younger brother, Jean II, was the progenitor of the only extant line of the family, that of Croÿ-Solre. All three lines engaged in a complex pattern of intermarriage, so that estates and titles would stay within the family as long as possible.

== The line of Croÿ-Aerschot ==
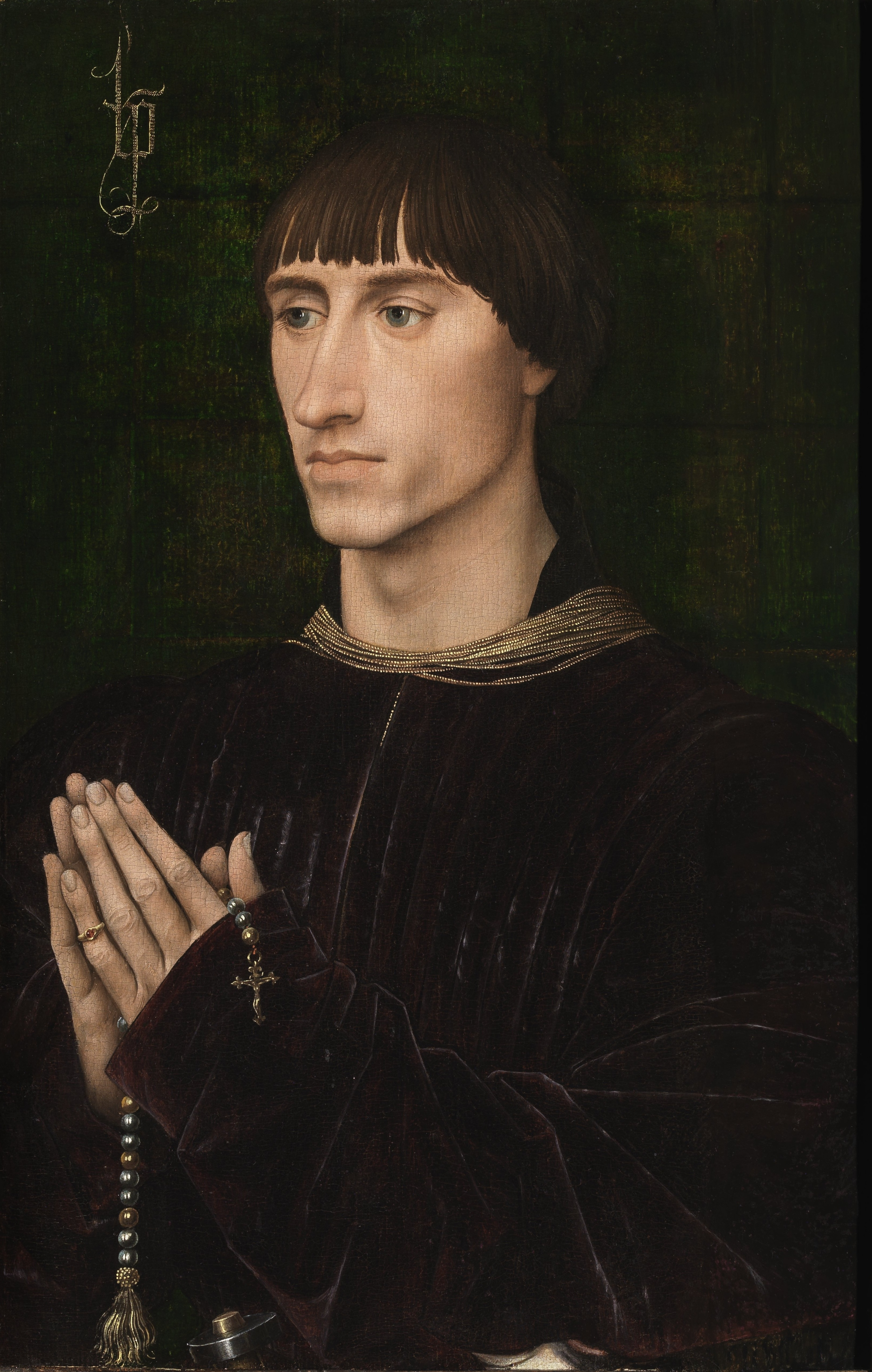
Portrait of Philippe I de Croÿ, by Rogier van der Weyden

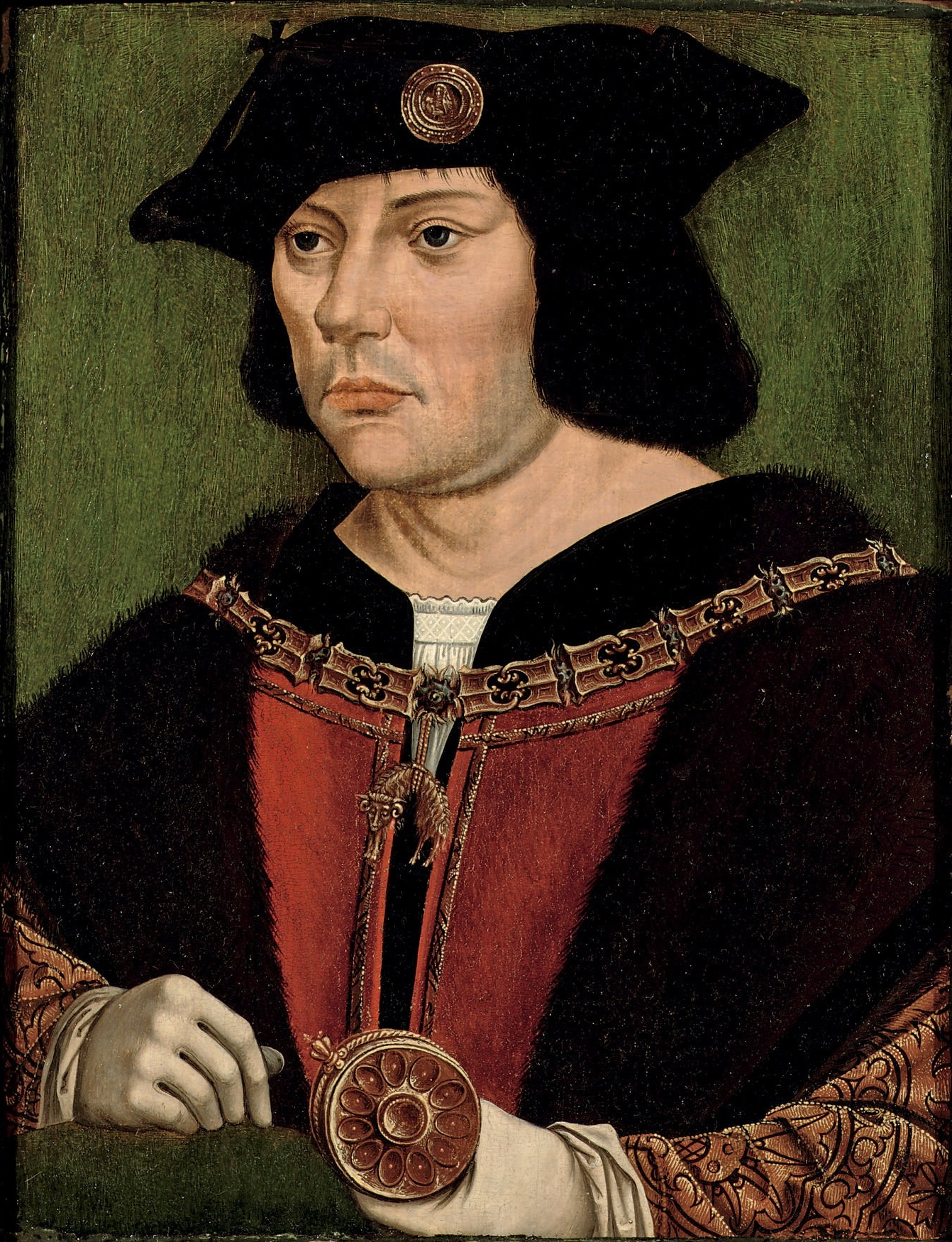
Guillaume II de Croÿ (1458–1521), Duke of Sora and Archi, godfather and tutor of the emperor Charles V, prime minister of Burgundy

Antoine was succeeded as count of Porcéan by his eldest son, Philippe I de Croÿ, governor of Luxembourg and Ligny. Philippe I de Croÿ was raised together with Charles the Bold, who arranged Philippe's marriage to Jacqueline of Luxembourg in 1455. The bride's father was extremely against the alliance and attempted to win his daughter back by force, but the Count of Porcéan closed the borders of Luxembourg and announced that the marriage had been consummated. In 1471 Philippe defected to the king of France with 600 knights but returned to Burgundy to fight for Charles during the Battle of Nancy. During the battle he was taken prisoner. Following Charles's death, Philippe de Croÿ helped arrange the betrothal of his heiress, Marie, with Emperor Maximilian I. Toward the end of his life, he was employed by the Emperor as governor of Valenciennes, lieutenant general of Liège, and captain general of Hainaut. Philippe commissioned a remarkable church in Château-Porcien, in which he was buried upon his death in 1511.

Among Philippe's sons, Antoine, Bishop of Thérouanne, predeceased his father and lies buried in Cyprus. More notable was Guillaume de Croÿ (1458–1521) (Guillermo de Chièvres, Chievres or Xebres in Spanish documents). As a tutor to Carlos I of Spain (afterwards Emperor Charles V), Guillaume became the power behind the Spanish throne during his pupil's minority, obtaining for himself the titles of Marquis of Aarschot and Duke of Soria and Archi. The Spanish aristocracy detested him as a foreigner, accusing him of pillaging the treasury and other irregularities, causing a wave of civil unrest to spread through Castile. Guillaume attended the Diet of Worms, where he was poisoned on 28 May 1521, apparently by German nobles afraid of his influence on imperial politics.

Guillaume's nephew and namesake, Guillaume III de Croÿ (1497–1521), was tutored by the Spanish humanist Juan Luís Vives. As it appeared unlikely he would succeed to the lands of his grandfather, Philippe I, he was steered toward the church. Family interests ensured his rapid promotion: he was elected bishop of Cambrai at the age of eighteen, and made a cardinal a few months later. Within a year, Charles V bestowed upon his young friend the archbishopric of Toledo, making him the primate of Spain. This unprecedented move brought Spain to the brink of a civil war. Guillaume accompanied his uncle and Charles to Worms, where on 6 January he died at the age of 23, following a fall from his horse. His tomb is in the Celestine monastery of Louvain, founded by his father.

Guillaume III's elder brother, Philippe II de Croÿ (1496–1549), succeeded to the County of Porcéan upon his father's death in 1514. Like his predecessors, he was Governor of Hainault and senior knight of the Order of the Golden Fleece, but it is as Charles V's general that he is best remembered. In 1533 Charles V created Philippe Duke of Soria and Archi and grandee of Spain. Earlier, he had become marquis of Renty and exchanged the lordship of Longwy in Normandy for that of Havré, which his descendants would develop as the family seat. His first wife was a cousin, Anne de Croÿ, Princess of Chimay. She died in 1539, and nine years later Philippe married Anna of Lorraine, leaving offspring by both marriages.

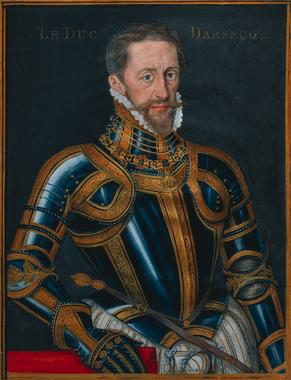
Philippe III de Croÿ, Duke of Arschot

Philippe II's eldest son, Charles I de Croÿ (1522–51), inherited the principality of Chimay from his mother and succeeded to the duchy of Aarschot upon his father's death. He was assassinated in Quievrain two years later, leaving no children by his marriage to Louise of Lorraine-Guise. Thereupon Chimay and Aarschot passed to Philippe II's second son, Philippe III.

Philippe de Croÿ, Duke of Aerschot (1526–1595), was made 216th knight of the Order of the Golden Fleece by Philip II of Spain. In 1567 his cousin Antoine III de Croÿ, 1st Prince of Porcéan died without issue by his marriage to Catherine of Cleves, and the principality of Porcéan devolved upon Philippe. His devotion to the Roman Catholic Church, which he expressed by showing his delight at the Massacre of St. Bartholomew, led Philip II to regard him with great favor. He was appointed governor of the citadel of Antwerp but defected to the other side before long. Jealous of William the Silent's influence, he was then the head of the party which induced Archduke Matthias (afterwards emperor) to undertake the sovereignty of the Netherlands, and soon afterwards was appointed governor-general of Flanders by the state council. A strong party, including the burghers of Ghent, distrusted the new governor; Arschot, who was taken prisoner during a riot at Ghent, was only released on promising to resign office. He then sought to regain the favor of Philip of Spain, and having been pardoned by the king in 1580 again shared in the government of the Netherlands; but he refused to serve under the Count of Fuentes when he became governor-general in 1594, and retired to Venice, where he died in December 1595.

Philippe III was succeeded by his only son, Charles II de Croÿ (1560–1612), who was created Duke of Croÿ by Henry IV of France in 1598. As Charles was childless, the duchy of Arschot passed to his sister Anne de Croÿ, who had married Charles de Ligne, 2nd Prince of Arenberg, thus bringing Aarschot to the House of Arenberg. Another sister, Marguerite, inherited the lordships of Halewyn and Comines, which passed to her husband, Wratislaw, Count of Fürstenberg.

== The line of Croÿ-Havré ==
=== First line ===
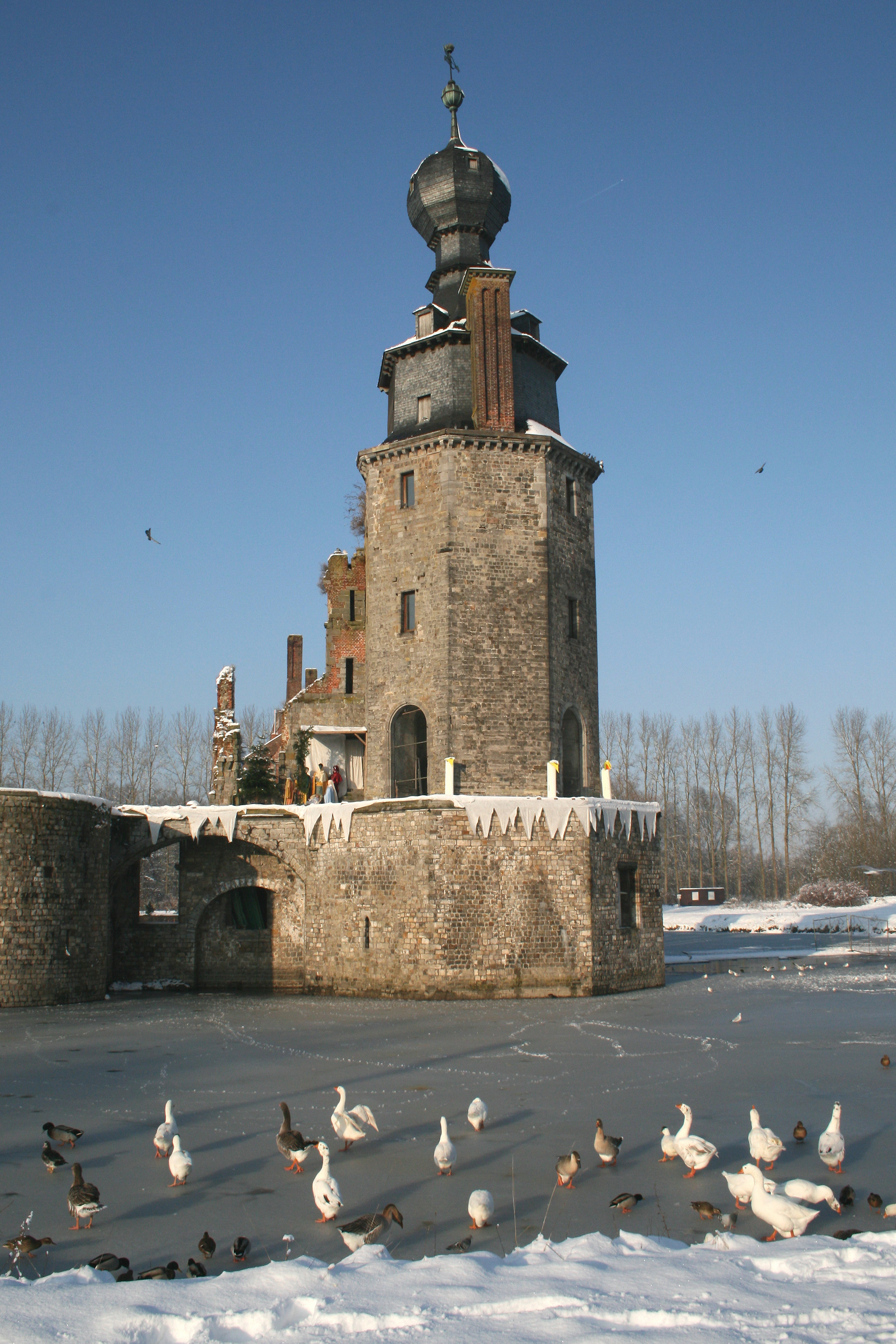
Château d'Havré - a family seat of the line of Croÿ-Havré

Charles Philippe de Croÿ (1549–1613) was the eldest son of Philippe II by his second wife, Anne of Lorraine. A successful imperial general, he was created Prince of the Holy Roman Empire in 1594. It was the first time when a simple baron was admitted among Princes of the Empire.

Charles Alexandre de Croÿ, Marquis of Havré (1581–1624) was the son of the preceding. He inherited the title of Prince of Croÿ from his father, that of Count of Fontenoy from his mother, Diane de Dompmartin, and that of Duke of Croÿ (in the French peerage) - from his childless cousin and brother-in-law, Charles II. He served as a hereditary marshal of the Holy Empire in the Battle of White Mountain, and advised Archduke Albert of Austria, Governor of Netherlands in the capacity of his chamberlain. Philip III of Spain made him the Superintendent of Finances and a Grandee of Spain. His second wife was Countess Geneviève d'Urfé. Charles Alexandre was murdered in November 1624. His reminiscences were not published until 1642.

Charles Alexandre's nephew, Ernst Bogislaw von Croÿ (1620–1684), inherited both princely and ducal titles of Croÿ when he was just four years old. As his father died a month after his birth, Ernst Bogislaw was brought up by his mother, Anne de Croy (also known as Anna of Pomerania in her native land, where he was styled Prince of Massow and of Neugarten). Although he was destined for the church and received the see of Cammin in due time, Ernst Bogislaw also had illegitimate children by several mistresses. He died in Königsberg at the age of 63 and was buried in Stolp Castle.

=== Second line ===
Charles Antoine Joseph de Croÿ, 4th Duke of Havré (1683–1710)

Marie Claire de Croÿ (1605–1664) was Charles Alexandre's only daughter by marriage to Princess Yolande de Ligne. She married two of her distant cousins, Charles Philippe de Croÿ, Marquis of Renty (in 1627) and then his brother Philippe Francois de Croÿ, Count of Solre (in 1643), in order to preclude the family estates from passing to another family. At the time of her first marriage, Philip III of Spain raised her marqusate of Havré to a dukedom, with her as the first duchess.

By her first marriage, she had two children - Philippe Eugene de Croÿ, Bishop of Valencia and Marie Ferdinande, Marquise of Renty, the wife of Louis Philippe, Count of Egmond. Her only son by the second marriage, Ferdinand de Croÿ-Solre, succeeded to the ducal title. Among his children, Charles, 4th Duke of Havré, was killed at Saragossa in 1710; Marie Therese left children by her marriage to Landgrave Philip of Hesse-Darmstadt; and Jean-Baptiste de Croÿ, the 5th Duke, left children by his marriage to Marie Anne Lante Montefeltro della Rovere (daughter of Antonio Lante Montefeltro della Rovere). This line came to an end in 1839, when the 7th Duke of Havré and Croÿ died in Paris, aged ninety-five, having outlived all of his sons. His daughter and heiress married a distant cousin, Emmanuel de Croÿ-Solre, who succeeded to the estates and titles.

The 7th Duke's sister, Louise Elisabeth de Croÿ-Havré (1749–1832), is best known for her book of memoirs on the French Revolution and the years of emigration that followed. A close friend of Queen Marie Antoinette, she was appointed by her to the vacant post of royal governess for the future Louis XVII. During the revolution, she was incarcerated with her own daughter and doomed to the guillotine when a mysterious gentleman smuggled them out of the prison. After one of her pupils ascended the throne as Charles X he made her an hereditary duchess. Louise Elisabeth de Croÿ, 1st Duchess of Tourzel died in the Château de Groussay on 15 May 1832.

== The line of Croÿ-Roeulx ==
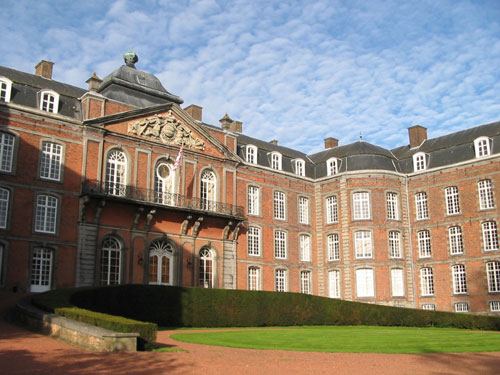
Château du Rœulx - a family seat of the line of Croÿ-Rœulx

The line of Counts of Rœulx descends from Jean III de Croÿ (1436–1505), the second son of Antoine le Grand and younger brother of Philippe I. Jean III's grandson, Adrien de Croÿ, 1st Count of Rœulx, served as governor of Flanders and Artois before his death in combat in 1553. His granddaughter is remembered as La Belle Franchine, the beautiful mistress of Alessandro Farnese.

In 1609, the senior line of the Counts of Rœulx became extinct, and the county passed to a cadet branch, represented by Eustache de Croÿ (1608–73), governor of Lille and Douai. Eustache's son, Ferdinand Gaston Lamoral de Croÿ, unexpectedly succeeded to the duchy of Croÿ in 1684, when the most senior member of the house, Ernst Bogislaw von Croÿ, had died in Königsberg. After Ferdinand's grandson, 6th Duke of Croÿ, died childless at Le Rœulx in 1767, the line of Croÿ-Rœulx expired and the Château du Rœulx together with the ducal title passed to the line of Croÿ-Solre (see below).

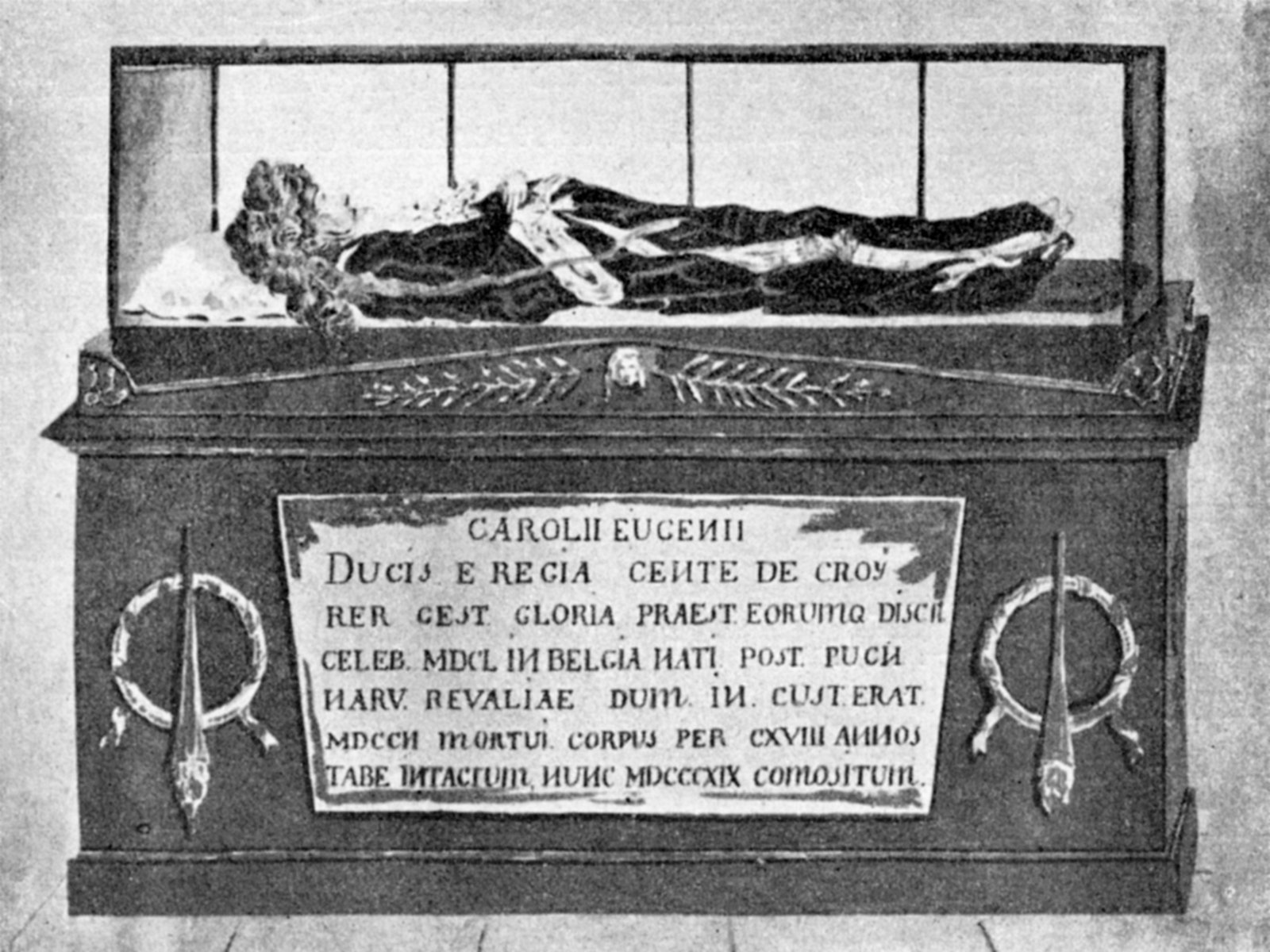
19th-Century drawing of de Croÿ's mummy at St. Nicholas' Church, Tallinn.

Probably the most illustrious member of the Croÿ-Rœulx branch was Eustache's nephew, Charles Eugène de Croÿ (1651–1702). He participated in the Battle of Lund (1676) against the Swedes before succeeding to his father's title as Prince of Croÿ-Millendonck in 1681. Charles Eugene fought with success in the Imperial Austrian Army against the Turks and participated in both the liberation of Vienna in 1683 and the attack on Belgrade in 1690. He was promoted Imperial field marshal for his vital services to the Austrian crown. In 1697 he entered the Russian service and was put in charge of Peter I's forces fighting in Livonia during the initial stages of the Great Northern War. After suffering a humiliating defeat in the Battle of Narva on 20 November 1700, Charles Eugene was taken prisoner by the Swedes and died at their fortress of Reval on 30 January 1702. On demand of his creditors, his body was not buried for more than a century (190 years-until 1897), and, when mummified, was exhibited in a glass coffin as a curiosity, with fees paid by tourists as a price of admission used to settle his debts.

== The line of Croÿ-Solre ==
=== Origins ===
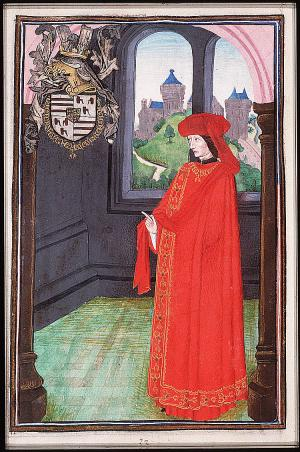
Jean II Croÿ as Knight in the Order off the Golden Fleece, 1473

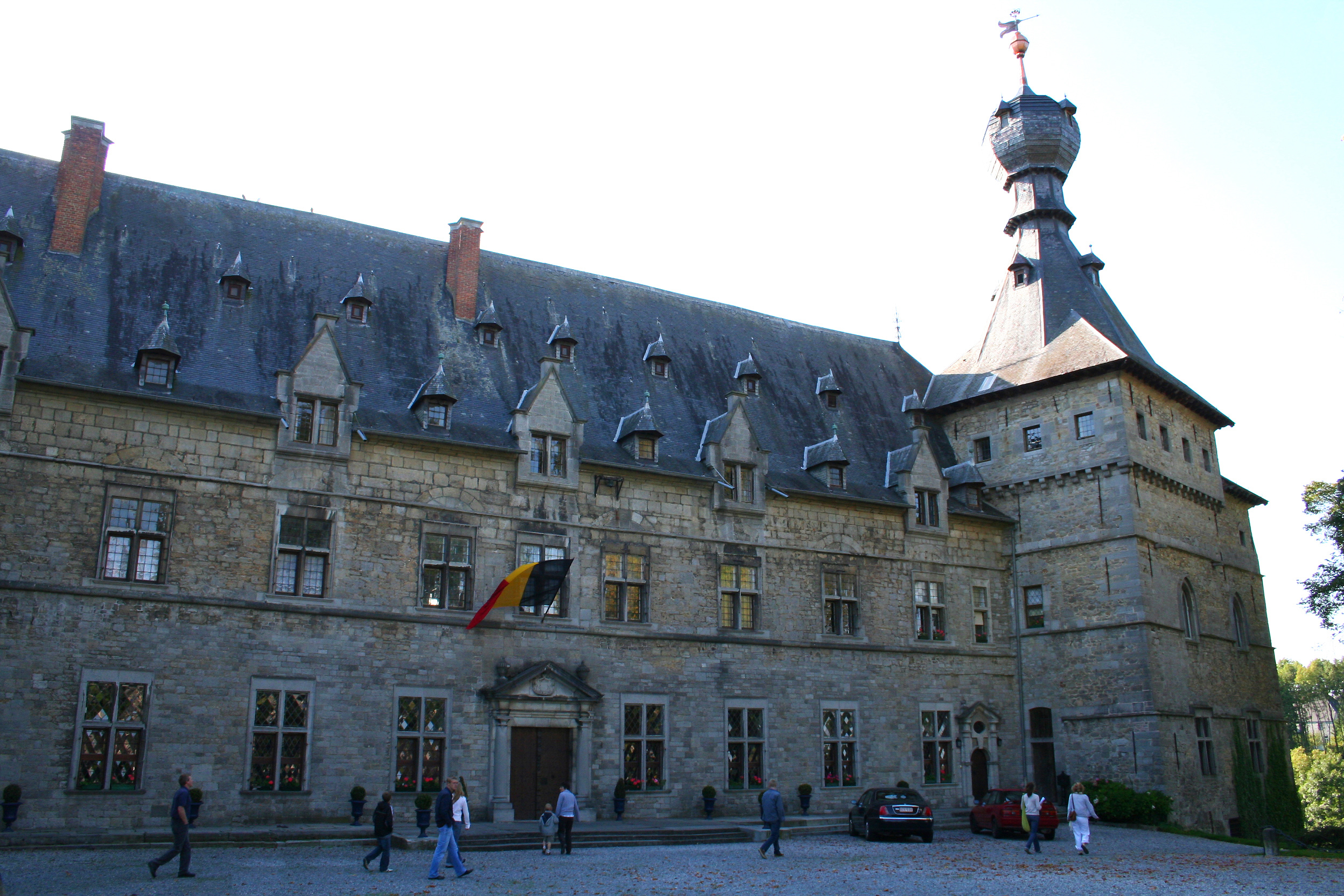
Chimay Castle in Belgium

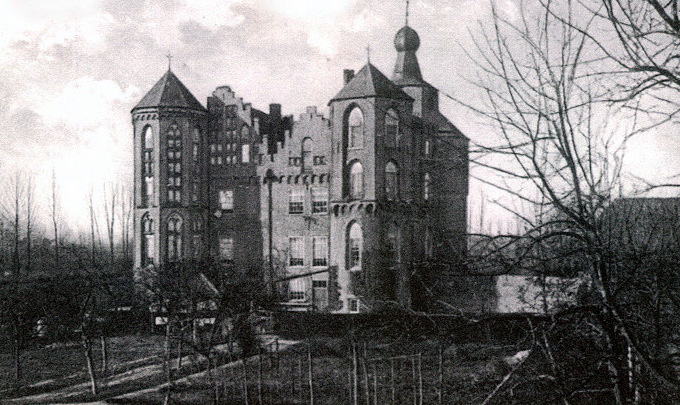
Croÿ Castle in the Netherlands

The only line of the House of Croÿ existing today, that of Croÿ-Solre, descends from Antoine le Grand's younger brother, Jean II de Croÿ (1395–1473), who governed Hainaut and Namur in the name of the Dukes of Burgundy. His dominions were centred on the town of Chimay, of which he became the first count. In 1430, he was made one of the first Knights of the Order of the Golden Fleece.

Jean II's grandson, Count Charles de Croÿ-Chimay (1455–1527), made a name for himself in the Battle of Guinegate in 1479. He succeeded to the county of Chimay in 1482 and to the possessions of his mother, a countess of Mors-Saarwerden, several years later. In 1500, Charles was summoned to take part in the baptism of the future emperor Charles V, during whose minority he served as one of the governors. The Prince of Chimay had many children by his wife, Louise d'Albret, sister of Jean d'Albret, King of Navarre. Only two daughters reached the age of majority, Anne inheriting Chimay while Marguerite obtained Wavrin. The former married a cousin, Philippe II de Croÿ, Duke of Arschot (see above), and their children succeeded to the principality of Chimay.

Jacques III de Croÿ-Sempy (1508–1587) was Jean II's great-grandson and Charles de Chimay's nephew. It was through his mother, Louise of Luxembourg, that he succeeded to the Château of Fontaine-l'Évêque in 1529, later obtaining more lands as a dowry for his three marriages. His last wife, Yolande de Lannoy, brought the manors of Molembais, Solre, and Tourcoing to the House of Croÿ. Their son Philippe was the first to style himself Count of Solre. He died in Bohemia in 1612, leaving two daughters and four sons, of whom the eldest, Jean de Croÿ, Count of Solre, inherited his titles and distinguished himself at the Spanish court. A younger son married the 1st Duchess of Havré, giving birth to the second line of Croÿ-Havré, which expired in 1839 (see above).

=== Modern times ===
Towards the end of the 18th century, as other branches of the family were coming to an end, the line of Croÿ-Solre accumulated a number of their titles and possessions. During the French Revolution, Anne Emmanuel de Croÿ, 8th Duke of Croÿ (1743–1803), moved his seat from Le Rœulx to the Westphalian town of Dülmen, formerly a possession of his wife, a princess of Salm-Kyrburg. Among his sons, Prince Gustave of Croÿ (1773–1844) rose to become a cardinal and archbishop of Rouen.

Another son, Auguste de Croÿ, 9th Duke of Croÿ, better known as Le Bel Auguste (1765–1822), was mediatized upon the demise of the Holy Roman Empire in his capacity as sovereign prince of Dülmen. When the Bourbons were restored to the throne of France, Auguste was made a peer of France. From three of Auguste's sons – Alfred, Ferdinand and Philipp Franz – descend the three extant branches of the House of Croÿ, residing in Germany and France.

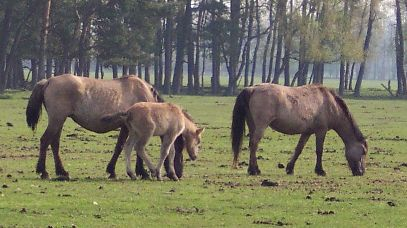
The only wild herd of Dülmen ponies extant today, owned by the Dukes of Croÿ

On 24 October 1913, Karl Rudolf, 13th Duke of Croÿ, married Nancy Leishman, daughter of Pittsburgh industrialist John George Alexander Leishman, United States Ambassador to Germany and former president of Carnegie Steel. In 1974, Karl Rudolf died and was succeeded by his son Carl, 14th Duke of Croÿ (1914–2011); Carl was married to Princess Gabriele, daughter of Crown Prince Rupprecht of Bavaria.

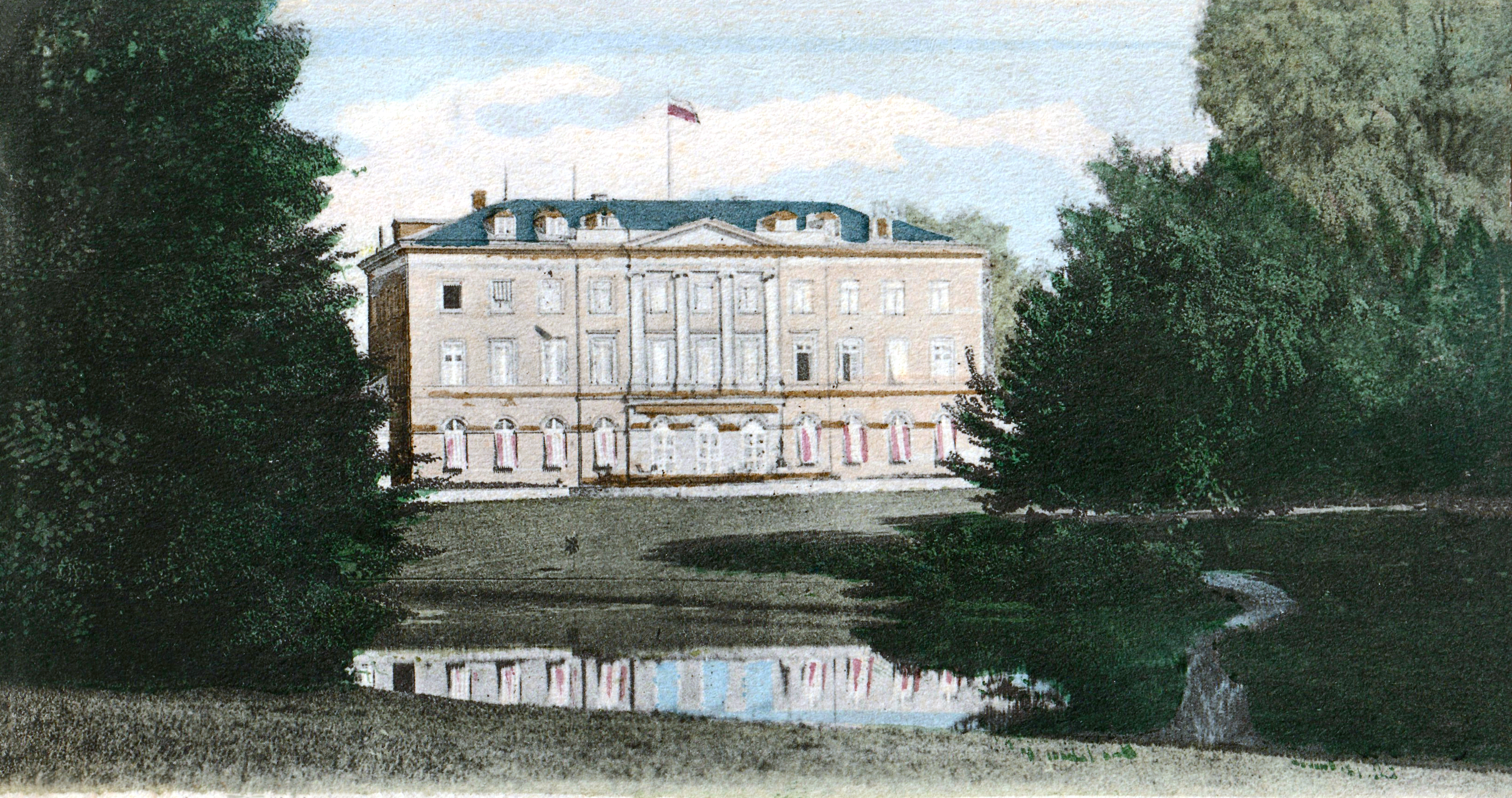
Schloss Dülmen (destroyed in 1945)

Their eldest son, Rudolf, the 15th and current Duke of Croÿ (b. 1955), married Alexandra Miloradovich, member of the Miloradović noble family; they had six children. Duchess Alexandra died on 23 September 2015; her funeral took place at St Jakobus Kirche in Dülmen on 3 October 2015. The Duke and his family live at their Haus Merfeld estate near Dülmen.

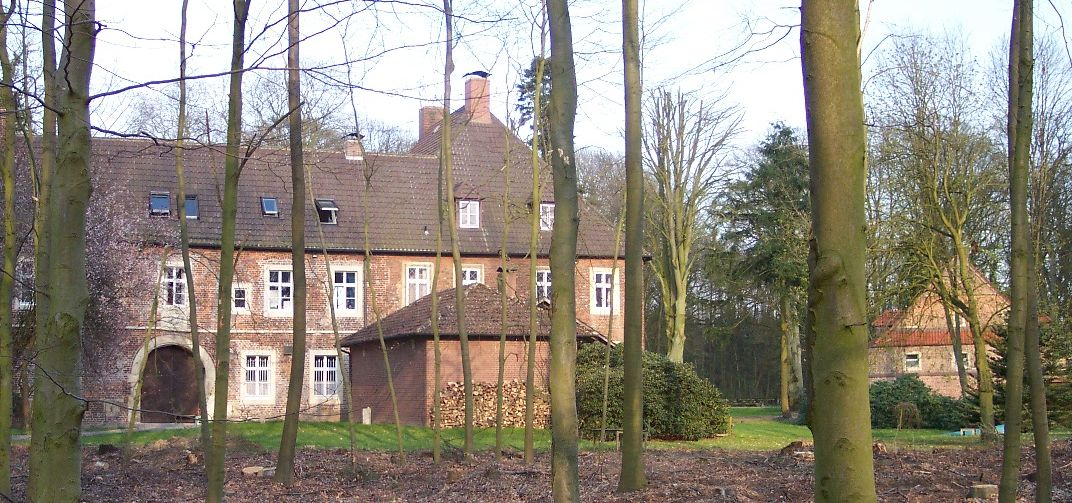
Haus Merfeld

In 1965 Princess Charlotte von Croÿ (1938–2026) married Kraft, Prince of Hohenlohe-Langenburg, son of Princess Margarita of Greece and Denmark (descendant of Queen Victoria and sister-in-law of Queen Elizabeth II).

== Dukes of Croÿ of the Solre line (1767–present) ==
- Philippe Emanuel Ferdinand of Croÿ (1641–1718), created Prince of Solre
  - Philippe-Alexandre-Emmanuel of Croÿ (1676–1723), 2nd Prince of Solre
    - Emmanuel, 7th Duke 1767–1784 (1718–1784), 3rd Prince of Solre
      - Anne Emmanuel, 8th Duke 1784–1803 (1743–1803), 4th Prince of Solre
        - Auguste, 9th Duke 1803–1822 (1765–1822), Solre title passed to his brother
          - Alfred, 10th Duke 1822–1861 (1789–1861)
            - Rudolf, 11th Duke 1861–1902 (1823–1902)
              - Karl Alfred, 12th Duke 1902–1906 (1859–1906)
                - Karl Rudolf, 13th Duke 1906–1974 (1889–1974)
                  - Carl, 14th Duke 1974–2011 (1914–2011)
                    - Rudolf, 15th Duke 2011–present (born 1955)
                      - Carl Philipp, Hereditary Prince of Croÿ (born 1989)
                      - Prince Marc Emanuel of Croÿ (born 1992)
                      - Prince Heinrich of Croÿ (born 1993)
                      - Prince Alexander of Croÿ (born 1995)
                    - Prince Stefan of Croÿ (born 1959)
                      - Prince Lionel of Croÿ (born 1996)
                  - Prince Clemens Franz of Croÿ (born 1934)
                    - Prince Carl Clemens of Croÿ (born 1963)
                      - Prince Vincenz of Croÿ (born 1993)
                      - Prince Sebastian of Croÿ (born 1995)
                    - Prince Constantin of Croÿ (born 1968)
                      - Prince Emanuel of Croÿ (born 2008)
                - Prince Anton Prosper Clemens of Croÿ (1893–1973)
                  - Prince Clemens Anton Philipp Joseph of Croÿ (born 1926)
                    - Prince Eugen Alexander of Croÿ (born 1953)
                    - Prince Philipp Alexander of Croÿ (born 1957)
                      - Prince Alexander of Croÿ (born 1987)
                      - Prince Maximilian of Croÿ (born 1988)
                    - Prince Albrecht-Alexander of Croÿ (born 1959)
                      - Prince Julius Constantin of Croÿ (born 1993)
                    - Prince Engelbert of Croÿ (born 1962)
                      - Prince Constantin of Croÿ (born 1992)
                      - Prince Carl-Georg of Croÿ (born 1994)
                  - Prince Anton Egon Clemens of Croÿ (1945–2003)
                    - Prince Anton Clemens of Croÿ (born 1974)
                    - Prince Anton Ferdinand of Croÿ (born 1994)
            - Prince Alexis Wilhelm of Croÿ (1825–1898), ancestor of Bohemian line
          - Prince Ferdinand Victor Philippe of Croÿ (1791–1865), ancestor of the Belgian houses of Croÿ-Solre, Croÿ du Rœulx (Croÿ-Rœulx) and Croÿ-Rumillies.
          - Prince Philipp Franz of Croÿ (1801–1871), male line survives

== Coats of arms ==
Original arms

Jean I de Croÿ

Philippe de Croÿ

Jean II de Croÿ

Charles Philippe de Croÿ

Guillaume de Croÿ

Emmanuel de Croÿ

Croy-Solre-Dülmen

== Members ==
- Jean I de Croÿ (1365–1415)
- Antoine de Croy, Comte de Porcéan (1385–1475)
- Jean II de Croÿ (1390–1473)
- Philippe I de Croÿ (1435–1511)
- Philip I of Croÿ-Chimay (1436–1482)
- Charles I de Croÿ (1455–1527)
- William de Croÿ, advisor to Emperor Charles V (1458–1521)
- William de Croÿ (archbishop) (1497–1521)
- Philippe II de Croÿ (1496–1549)
- Charles de Croÿ, Prince of Chimay (1506–1564), Bishop of Tournai, 1524 to 1564
- Charles II de Croÿ (1522–1551)
- Philippe III de Croÿ (1526–1595)
- Charles III de Croÿ (1560–1612)
- Ernst Bogislaw von Croÿ (1620–1684)
- Charles Eugène de Croÿ (1651–1702)
- Louise Elisabeth de Croÿ-Havré (1749–1832)
- Gustave de Croÿ-Solre (1772–1844)
- Princess Isabella of Croÿ (1856–1931), married Archduke Friedrich, Duke of Teschen

== Sources ==
Georges Martin. Histoire et Généalogie Maison de Croÿ. HGMC, 2002.

Werner Paravicini. Montée, crise, réorientation. Pour unse histoire de la famille de Croy au XVe siècle, in: Revue belge de philologie et d'histoire 98 (2020), 2, pp. 149–355.
