= Jean de Croÿ =

Jean de Croÿ can refer to:

- Jean I de Croÿ, Baron of Renty and Seneghem (around 1365 – 1415)
- Jean II de Croÿ, Count of Chimay (1390? – 1473)
- Jean de Croÿ, Count of Solre (1588—1640)
