= Philip I de Croÿ =

Member of the House of Croÿ and Count of Porcéan

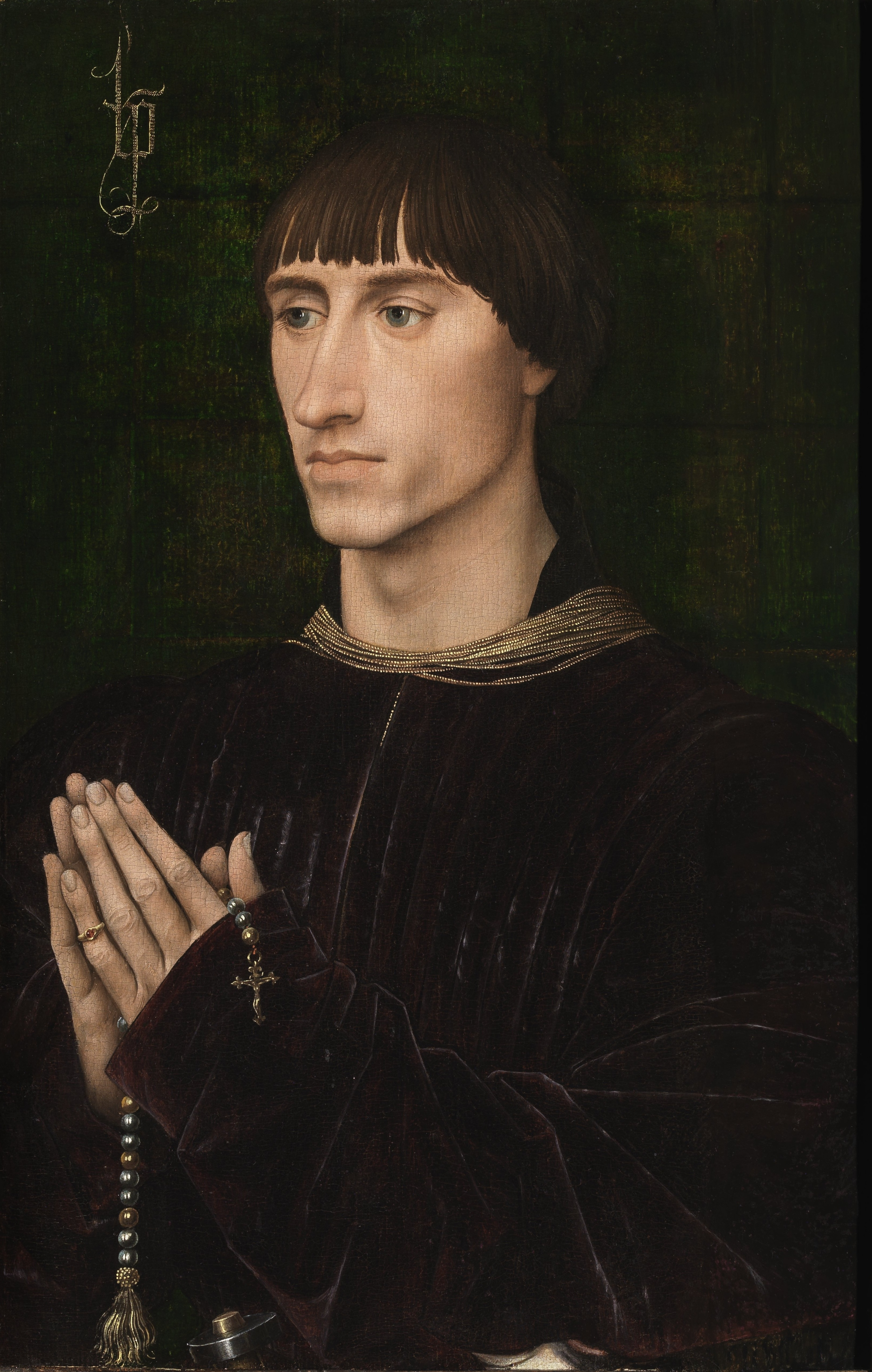
Portrait of Philip de Croÿ

Philip I de Croÿ (1435–1511) was Seigneur de Croÿ and Count of Porcéan. Philip I was a legitimate heir to the powerful House of Croÿ. He was the eldest surviving son of Antoine de Croÿ, Comte de Porcéan and Margaret of Lorraine-Vaudémont. Philip was raised with Charles the Bold, who arranged Philip's marriage to Jacqueline of Luxembourg in 1455. The bride's father, Louis de Luxembourg, Count of Saint-Pol, was extremely against the alliance and attempted to win his daughter back by force, but the Count of Porcéan closed the borders of Luxembourg and announced that the marriage had been consummated. He was also Governor of Luxembourg and Ligny.

Philip had determination and a strong force of personality, and was both respected as an administrator and accomplished in battle. He is recorded as a participant in most of the battles of Philip the Good and Charles the Bold, during which his fortunes ranged from being knighted for valour to being held hostage.

In 1471 he defected to the King of France with 600 knights but returned to Burgundy to fight for Charles during the Battle of Nancy. It was during the battle that he was taken prisoner. Following Charles's death, Philip helped arrange the betrothal of his heiress Marie with Emperor Maximilian I. He subsequently fought for Maximilian against the French at the Battle of Guinegate (1479).

Towards the end of his life, he was employed by the Emperor as Governor of Valenciennes, Lieutenant General of Liege, and Captain General of Hainaut. Philippe commissioned a church in Château-Porcien, in which he was buried upon his death in 1511.

== Children ==
Philippe I de Croÿ and Jacqueline of Luxembourg had:

- Henry de Croÿ (died 1514), married Charlotte de Chateaubriand (died 1509) and had issue:
  - Philippe II, Duke of Aarschot (1496–1549)
  - William de Croÿ (1498–1521), also known as Guillaume III de Croÿ, Bishop of Cambrai and Archbishop of Toledo
  - Robert de Croÿ (1500–1556), Bishop of Cambrai
  - Jacqueline de Croÿ, married Anthony of Glymes
- Antoine de Croÿ, Bishop of Thérouanne, died on 21 September 1495 in Cyprus and lies buried there.
- Guillaume de Croÿ (1458–1521), Also known as: Guillaume II de Croÿ, was Preceptor (chief tutor) and First Chamberlain of the infant Charles V, Holy Roman Emperor, no issue

== Sources ==
- Brown, Cynthia J. (1995). Poets, Patrons, and Printers: Crisis of Authority in Late Medieval France. Cornell University Press.
- Hulin de Loo, Georges. "Diptychs of Rogier van der Weyden: I". Burlington Magazine, Vol 43, No. 245, 1923. 53–58
- de Mandrot, B. (1901). Memoires de Philippe de Commynes (in French). Vol. I. Alphonse Picard et Fils.
- Vaughan, Richard (1970). Philip the Good: The Apogee of Burgundy. Vol. 3. The Boydell Press.
