= Montcornet =

Montcornet may refer to:

- Montcornet, Aisne, a municipality in the Aisne department, France
  - Battle of Montcornet, an engagement of the Battle of France on 17 May 1940
- Montcornet, Ardennes, in the Ardennes department, France
  - Château de Montcornet, a castle
