= Jean IV of Ligne =

Member from the House of Ligne

Jean IV of Ligne (c. 1435 - 15 May 1491) (French: Jean de Ligne) was a member from the House of Ligne from the Low Countries in the service of the Dukes of Burgundy.

== Biography ==
Jean was the son of Michel, baron of Barbançon, and grandson of Jean II of Ligne (ca.1361-1442). Until 1468 he was known as lord of Rely, after a lordship from his mother's dowry.

He inherited the Hainaut lordships of Ligne, Stambruges and Montrœul-sur-Haine, and the lordship of Belœil, a fief of the county of Namur, from his uncle Jean III of Ligne, who had died childless in 1468. He was also hereditary Marshal of Hainaut.

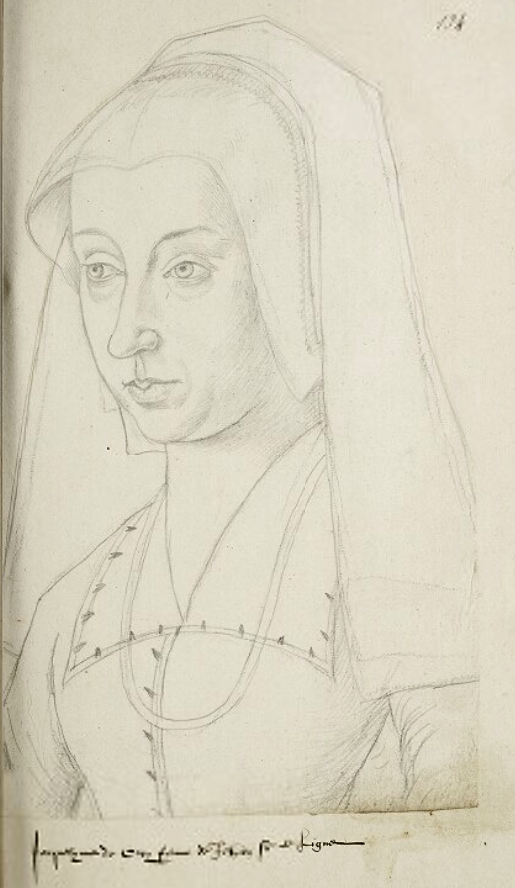
Jacqueline de Croÿ

Jean married Jacqueline de Croÿ, daughter of Antoine I de Croÿ, on 16 May 1472. This association with the influential house of Croÿ proved very favorable for Ligne's reputation.

Jean became chamberlain to Charles the Bold and accompanied him, among other things, at the Siege of Neuss. After Charles' death he enlisted in Maximilian's service and fought against the French at the Battle of Guinegate (1479), where he was captured. To pay the ransom of 9,000 ecu, he sold the seigniory of Woelingen to Godfried van Gavere.

In 1481, Jean became the first knight in the Order of the Golden Fleece from the house of Ligne. Jean had become one of Maximilian's closest advisers during his regency in the name of his son Philip the Fair, together with Pierre de Hennin, Baudouin de Lannoy and Antoine Rolin.

At the conclusion of the Treaty of Arras (1482), it was Jean of Ligne who officially placed the toddler Margaret of Austria in the hands of the French to be married to the Dauphin. After the resumption of hostilities, Jean defeated the French and recaptured the castle of Oudenaarde (1484). He then played a role in suppressing the Flemish revolts against Maximilian of Austria.

Jean died in 1491 and was interred in Belœil. His only son, Antoine of Ligne, succeeded him.

== Sources ==
- Biographie Nationale de Belgique, vol.12, col. 135
- Jean III de Ligne, Baron de Ligne, Seigneur de Roubaix op Genealogics
- Donche, P. : "Une liste de nobles du comté de Hainaut vers 1427-1430" (PDF)
