= Charles II de Croÿ =

- Prince of Chimay; Duke of Aarschot
- Born: 31 July 1522
- Died: 24 June 1551 (aged 28); Quiévrain, Belgium
- Spouse: Louise of Lorraine (m. 1541; died 1542) Antoinette of Burgundy (m. 1549; murdered 1551)
- House: Croÿ
- Father: Philippe II de Croÿ
- Mother: Anne de Croÿ

Charles II de Croÿ (31 July 1522 – Quiévrain, 24 June 1551) was Seigneur de Croÿ, 2nd Duke of Aarschot, 3rd Prince of Chimay and 3rd Count of Beaumont.

== Early life ==
Charles, born on 31 July 1522, was the eldest son of Philippe II de Croÿ, Duke of Aarschot, and Anne de Croÿ, Princess of Chimay (daughter and heir of Charles I de Croÿ). (Note: Hanno Wijsman states Philippe II de Croy married Anne de Croy, Princess of Chimay. Hanno, does not, mention Charles b. 1522 as their son.)

== Career ==
After his mother's death in 1539, he inherited the Principality of Chimay, and after his father's death in 1549, the Duchy of Aarschot, thus uniting for the first time the two great titles of the House of Croÿ.

== Personal life ==
In 1541, Charles married Louise of Lorraine (1521–1542), daughter of Claude, Duke of Guise and Antoinette de Bourbon. After Louise's death the following year, he married Antoinette of Burgundy (1529–1588) in 1549. Antoinette was the sister of Maximilian II of Burgundy, who was married to Charles' sister, Louise de Croÿ (1524–1585).

Charles de Croÿ was murdered in 1551 in Quiévrain. Because he had no children, all his titles and possessions went to his younger brother Philippe III de Croÿ. His widow later married Jacques d’Anneux, Seigneur d'Aubencourt. His brother was succeeded by his son, Charles III de Croÿ (who like Charles II, died childless).

== Sources ==
- Carroll, Stuart (2009). Martyrs and Murderers: The Guise Family and the Making of Europe. Oxford University Press.
