= Antoine I de Croÿ =

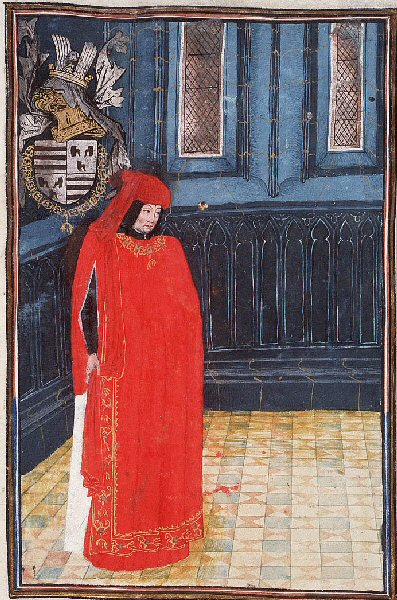
Antoine le Grand, as represented on a 15th-century miniature

Antoine I de Croÿ (the Great or Le Grand de Croÿ), Seigneur de Croÿ, Renty and Le Roeulx, Count of Porcéan (c. 1383/1387 – 21 September 1475), was a member of the House of Croÿ.

== Life ==
Antoine was the eldest surviving son and heir of Jean I de Croÿ and Marguerite de Craon, and was a key figure in 15th-century French politics. In 1452, he secured for himself the post of Governor General of the Netherlands and Luxembourg, and presided over the pro-French party at the court of Philip the Good, Duke of Burgundy. He was also one of the judges at the trial of John II of Alençon for treason in 1458.

Like his father, he led the French and Burgundian armies against Liège and distinguished himself at the Battle of Brouwershaven, fighting against the English. While on a mission to the court of King Charles VII of France, he was implicated in the assassination of Louis of Valois, Duke of Orléans, and as a consequence, suffered torture in the Château de Blois.

Having extricated himself from this predicament, Antoine used his power to expand his family's possessions: in 1429 he obtained the lordship and peerage of Le Rœulx; three years later, he married Marguerite of Lorraine-Vaudémont, daughter of Antoine, Count of Vaudémont and Marie of Harcourt, who brought Aarschot to his family as her dowry. In 1437, he married his daughter Jeanne to Louis I, Count Palatine of Zweibrücken, in order to increase his influence in the orbit of the Holy Roman Empire. He acquired Porcien in 1438, and was made Count of Porcéan and of Guînes by King Charles VII later in 1455. In 1446, he purchased the Château de Montcornet and completely rebuilt it. In 1455, he proceeded with the building of the Kasteel van Arenberg on the site of a demolished medieval castle, of which he had destroyed all but one tower; the château would not be completed until 1515, by his grandson, William de Croÿ.

With Charles the Bold, the future Duke of Burgundy, he was at loggerheads, especially after they had clashed over the inheritance of Jeanne d'Harcourt, Countess of Namur. Upon Charles's accession as Duke, Antoine was accused of plotting with astrologers to bring about the Duke's downfall and was compelled to flee to France. In France, he took part in the coronation of King Louis XI and was chosen as a godfather to the future king, Louis XII. It was not until the age of 83 that he reconciled himself with Charles the Bold and was allowed to reclaim his properties in Burgundy.

He died either in 1475 or 1477 and was interred in Porcien.

== Family ==
=== Marriage and children ===
Antoine de Croÿ married firstly in 1410, Marie Jeanne de Roubaix (1390–1430).

Antoine remarried on 5 October 1432, Marguerite of Lorraine-Vaudémont, Dame d'Aarschot (1420–1477), daughter of Antoine of Lorraine, Count of Vaudémont and Marie of Harcourt, and had six children by her:

- Philip I de Croÿ (c.1433–1511), his successor.
- Jeanne de Croÿ (1435–1504), married Louis I, Count Palatine of Zweibrücken.
- Jean III de Croÿ (1436–1505), progenitor of the line of Croÿ-Roeulx.
- Marie de Croÿ (c.1440–1489), who married Wilhelm II von Heinsberg, Graf of Blankenheim (1441-1469).
- Jacqueline de Croÿ (c.1445–1486), who married Jean IV de Ligne, Baron de Ligne (d. 1491).
- Isabelle (or Isabeau) de Croÿ (c.1446–1486)

=== Relatives ===
Agnes de Croÿ was his sister and the mistress of John the Fearless, Duke of Burgundy (the grandfather of Charles the Bold), by whom she had an illegitimate son, John of Burgundy, who became the Bishop of Cambrai and the Archbishop of Trier. Several noble families of Belgium and the Netherlands are descended from the eleven illegitimate children of this prelate.

The lines of Croÿ-Arschot-Havré and Croÿ-Roeulx stem from Antoine's two sons, Philippe I and Jean III, while his younger brother, Jean II de Croÿ, was the progenitor of the only extant line of the family, that of Croÿ-Solre. All three lines demonstrate a complex pattern of intermarriage, so that estates and titles would stay within the family as long as possible.

== Sources ==
- Harcourt (1996). "Index des Noms de Personnes". Annuaire-Bulletin de la Société de l'histoire de France. Editions de Boccard: 131–135.
- Vaughan, Richard (2002). Philip the Good. Boydell Press.
- Vaughan, Richard (2002a). John the Fearless. Boydell Press.
- de Wavrin, Jean (2012). Hardy, William (ed.). Recueil Des Chroniques Et Anchiennes Istories de la Grant Bretaigne a present Nomme Engleterre (in French). Vol. 3: From A.D. 1422 to A.D. 1431. Cambridge University Press.
