= Philip I of Croÿ-Chimay =

Belgian noble (1436–1482)

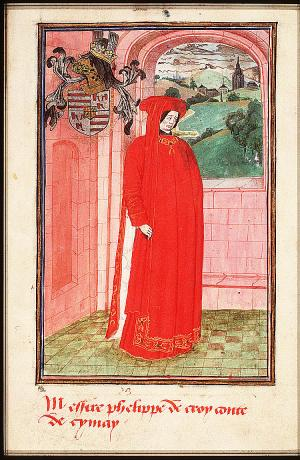
Philip I of Croÿ-Chimay, as Knight in the order of the Golden Fleece

Philip I of Croÿ-Chimay (November 1436 – Bruges, 14 September 1482), count of Chimay, Lord of Quiévrain, was a noble from the House of Croÿ, in the service of the Dukes of Burgundy.

== Life ==
Philip was the eldest son of Jean II de Croÿ, confidant of Philip the Good, and Mary of Lalaing.

Philip was knighted at the age of 17 after the Battle of Gavere. At a young age, he became grand baillif of Hainaut. At the age of 28, he was appointed Chamberlain of Charles the Bold, who was not consulted in this decision. This fact strengthened Charles's already strong hate towards the Croÿ family.

When Charles the Bold came to power in 1465, he banished Philip, as well as his father Jean II and his uncle Antoine I de Croÿ. Philip was the first to reconcile with Charles in 1468. In 1471, he led an embassy to Ferdinand I of Naples and Pope Sixtus IV.

When his father died in 1473, Philip became the second count of Chimay. He became also a Knight in the Order of the Golden Fleece. Furthermore, he received the confiscated properties of Philippe de Commynes after his betrayal. Between 1474 and 1477, Philip was Stadtholder of the newly conquered Duchy of Guelders.

In 1477 Philip was taken prisoner in the Battle of Nancy, where Charles the Bold was killed. After his release, he entered in the service of Maximilian of Austria.

== Marriage and children ==
Philip married in 1453 with Walburga von Moers und Saarwerden. They had:

- Charles I of Croÿ-Chimay (1455–1527), count and later prince of Chimay
- Antoine of Croÿ-Chimay (died 1546), lord of Sempy
- Françoise, married Antoine of Luxembourg-Ligny, count of Charny
- Catharina, married Robert II de La Marck, Duke of Bouillon
- Margareta (died 1514), married 1501 count Jacob III of Horne

== Sources ==
- Bietenholz, Peter G.; Deutscher, Thomas Brian, eds. (1995). Contemporaries of Erasmus: A Biographical Register of the Renaissance and Reformation. University of Toronto Press.
- Jones, Michael (1986). Gentry and Lesser Nobility in Late Medieval Europe. Sutton.
- Vaughan, Richard (2010). Philip the Good: The Apogee of Burgundy. Vol. 3. The Boydell Press.
- Vaughan, Richard (2002). Charles the Bold: The Last Valois Duke of Burgundy. The Boydell Press.
- Paravicini, Werner (2020). Montée, crise, réorientation. Pour unse histoire de la famille de Croy au XVe siècle, in: Revue belge de philologie et d'histoire 98, 2, pp. 149–355.
