= Charles I de Croÿ =

Charles II de Croÿ
- Prince of Chimay
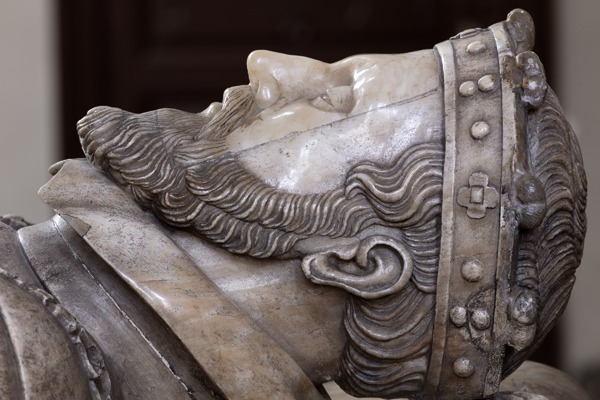
- Funeral monument to Charles I de Croÿ
- Born: 1455
- Died: 1527 (aged 71–72)
- Spouse: Louise d'Albret
- Issue: Anne de Croÿ; Margaret de Croÿ
- House: Croÿ
- Father: Philip I of Croÿ-Chimay
- Mother: Walburga von Moers und Saarwerden

Charles I de Croÿ (1455–1527), Count and later 1st Prince of Chimay, was a nobleman and politician from the Low Countries in the service of the House of Habsburg.

== Early life ==
Charles was born into the House of Croÿ as the eldest son of Philip I of Croÿ-Chimay and Walburga of Moers.

== Career ==
He was knighted by Maximilian of Austria on the eve of the Battle of Guinegate (1479). In this battle, he was almost killed when his stirrup broke and he was thrown to the ground. He was saved by Maximilian, Josse de Lalaing and a few Germans who came to his rescue, risking being enveloped themselves.

His loyalty to Maximilian and Philip the Fair was appreciated by the Habsburgs. In 1486, Maximilian raised Charles's County of Chimay to a Principality. Charles was from then on a Prince of the Holy Roman Empire. Furthermore, in 1491 he became a Knight in the Order of the Golden Fleece.

In 1500, Charles had the honor of being the godfather at the baptism of Charles V. He became the tutor of the young Charles, but because of frictions with the prince's aunt Margaret, he resigned in 1509 in favour of his cousin William de Croÿ.

Charles was in 1519 one of the negotiators during the talks which led to a military alliance with John II, Duke of Cleves. He was also stadtholder of the County of Hainaut and governor of Valenciennes, but he resigned in 1521 in favour of his son-in-law, Philippe II de Croÿ.

== Personal life ==
Charles married Louise d'Albret, daughter of Alain I of Albret. Together, they had eight children of which only two daughters survived:

- Anne de Croÿ (1501–1539), who married Philippe II de Croÿ, Duke of Aarschot and jure uxoris next Prince of Chimay.
- Margaret de Croÿ (1508–1549), who married Charles II de Lalaing, 2nd Count of Lalaing, in 1528.

The Prince de Chimay died in 1527.

== Sources ==
- Moreau, Gerard (1995). "Charles (I) de Croy". In Bietenholz, Peter G.; Deutscher, Thomas Brian (eds.). Contemporaries of Erasmus: A Biographical Register of the Renaissance and Reformation. Vol. 1: A-E. University of Toronto Press. pp. 363–364. ISBN 0-8020-2507-2.
