= Le Rœulx Castle =

Castle in Wallonia, Belgium

Coordinates: 50.505°N 4.109°E

- Wallonia, Belgium
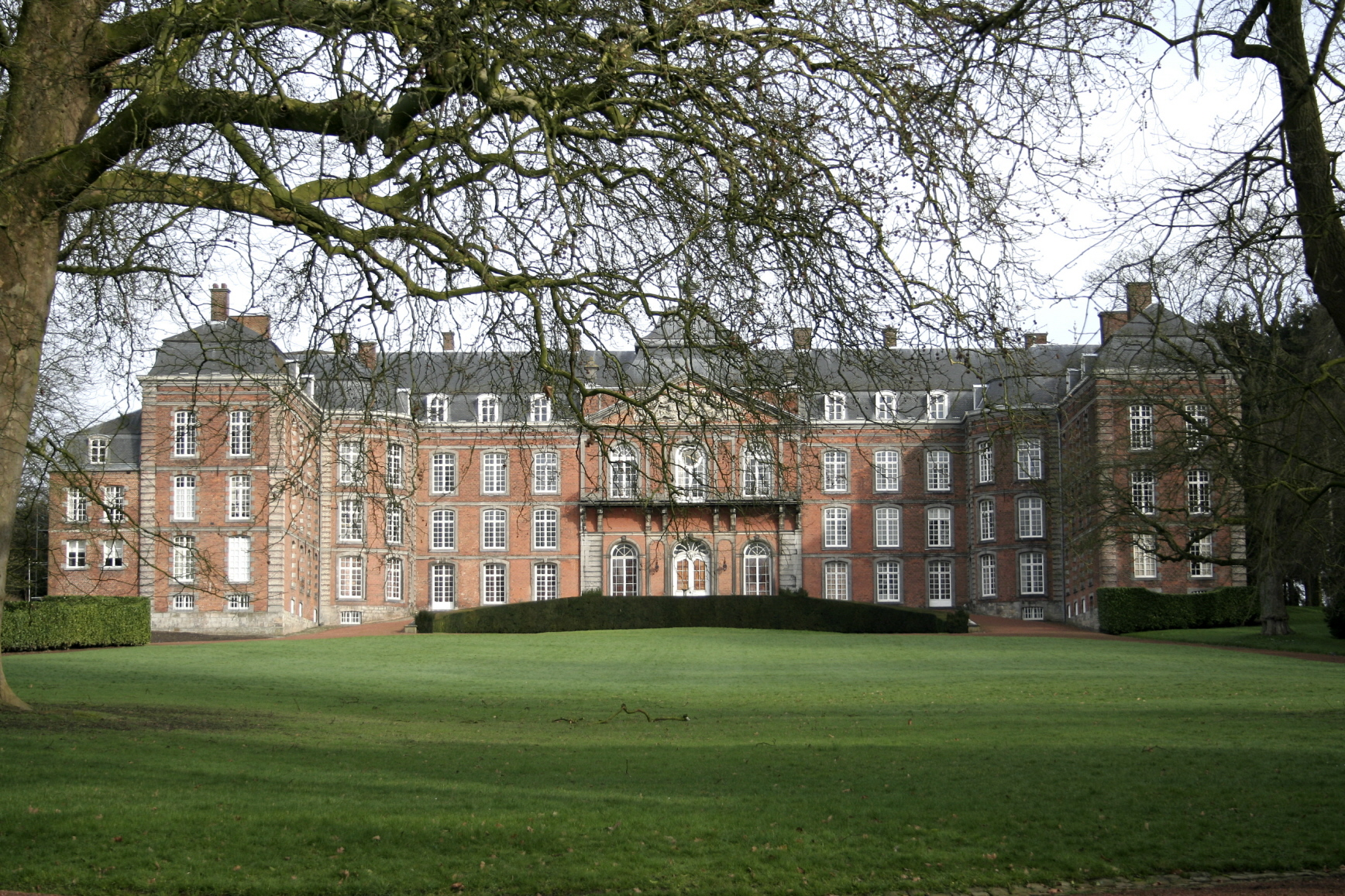

Site information
- Type: Castle

Le Rœulx Castle (French: Château du Rœulx), also known as the Château des Princes de Croÿ, or "castle of the Princes de Croÿ", is a castle in the town of Le Rœulx in the province of Hainaut, Wallonia, Belgium.

== See also ==
- List of castles in Belgium
- House of Croÿ
