= Jean I de Croÿ =

Founder of the House of Croÿ

Jean I de Croÿ, Seigneur of Croÿ et d'Araines, Baron of Renty and of Seneghem (around 1365 – 25 October 1415), was the founder of the House of Croÿ.

== Biography ==
Jean's parents were Guillaume I, Seigneur of Croÿ (†1384) and Isabeau of Renty. He was responsible for the ascendancy of his family to a position of supreme power in medieval Burgundy. He served Philip the Bold and his son John the Fearless in the capacity of councillor and chamberlain.

In 1384, Jean married a wealthy heiress, Marguerite de Craon (ca 1370–1420), successfully suing her first husband's family upon her death. In 1397, Jean acquired the lordship of Chimay, which was to become a core dominion of the Croÿ family. Four years later, he was appointed Governor of Artois and led the ducal armies against the rebellious citizens of Liège. He was recorded as the Grand-Bouteiller of King Charles VI of France in 1412, when he laid siege to Bourges.

The following year, Isabeau of Bavaria had Jean apprehended and incarcerated in the castle of Montlhéry, whence he escaped. Jean, together with one of his sons, was killed at the Battle of Agincourt on 25 October 1415.

He had seventeen children, including:

- Antoine I de Croÿ, Count of Porcéan (1385–1475)
- Archambaud de Croÿ (1386–1412)
- Jean de Croÿ (1387 – 1415 at Battle of Agincourt)
- Jean II de Croÿ (1395–1473), Prince of Chimay, progenitor of the House of Croÿ-Solre.
- Agnès de Croÿ (1386?), mistress of John the Fearless, Duke of Burgundy, by whom she had a natural son, John of Burgundy (Jean de Bourgogne), the future Bishop of Cambrai.
- Jeanne de Croÿ (1390–?), married Jean de Lannoy (c. 1370–1415), also killed at Agincourt, mother of Jan van Lannoy, Stadtholder of Holland.

== Sources ==
- Thielemans, Marie-Rose (1959). "Les Croÿ, conseillers des ducs de Bourgogne. Documents extraits de leurs archives familiales, 1357-1487". Bulletin de la Commission royale d'histoire. Académie royale de Belgique (in French). 124 (1): 1–141. doi:10.3406/bcrh.1959.1557.
- Vaughan, Richard (2002). John the Fearless. Boydell Press.
