= William de Croÿ =

Politician (1458–1521)

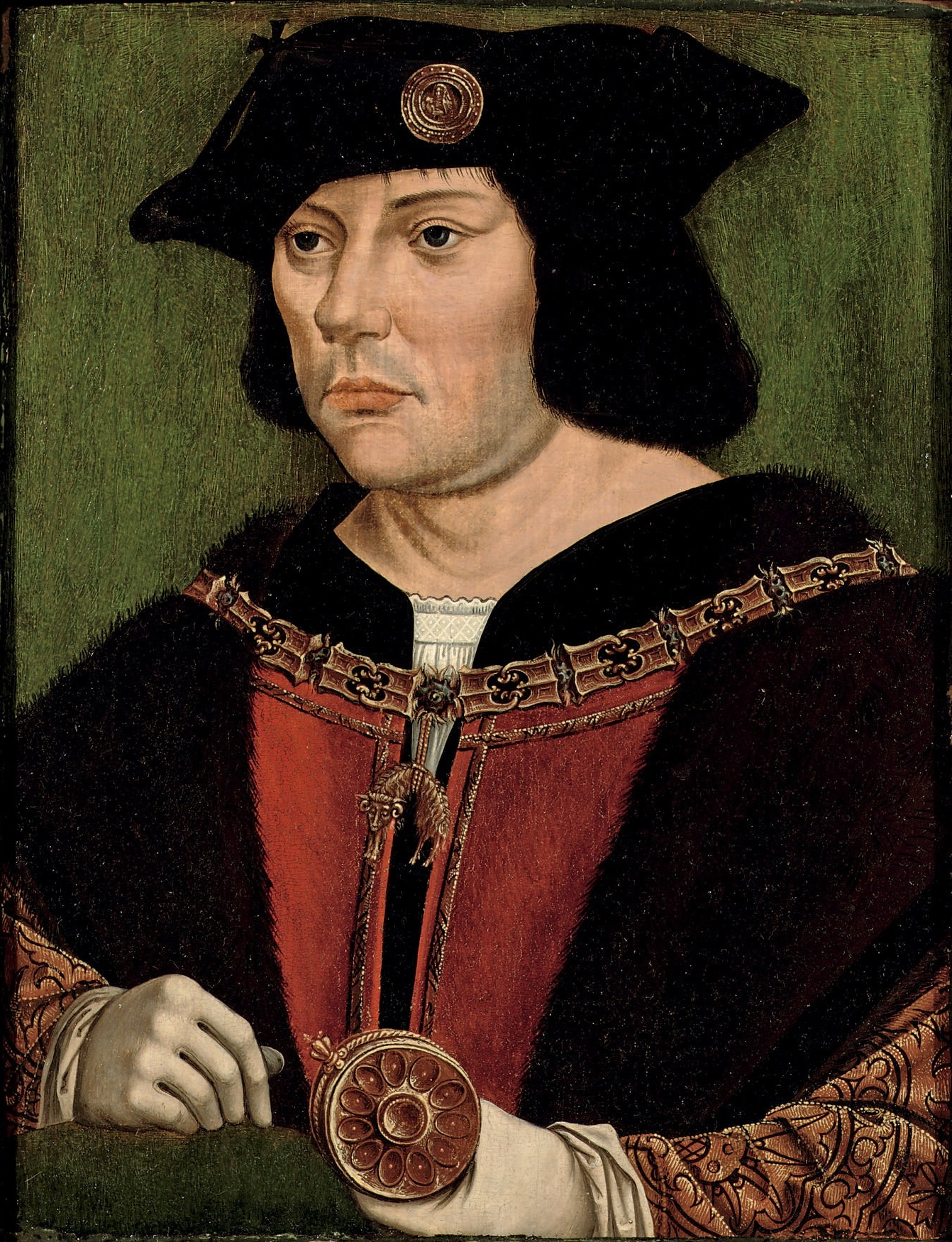
Portrait of William, circle of Quentin Matsys

Coat of Arms William de Croÿ

William II de Croÿ, Lord of Chièvres (1458 – 28 May 1521) (also known as: Guillaume II de Croÿ, sieur de Chièvres in French; Guillermo II de Croÿ, señor de Chièvres, Xevres or Xebres in Spanish; Willem II van Croÿ, heer van Chièvres in Dutch) was the chief tutor and First Chamberlain to Charles V. He was from the House of Croÿ.

== Biography ==
William was the second son of Philippe de Croÿ, Lord of Aarschot and Jacqueline of Luxembourg. William married Maria-Magdalena of Hamal, widow of Adolf van der Marck. William bought the lordships of Beaumont and Chièvres from his father in 1485. In 1489 he was one of the lords who tried to reason with Philip of Cleves during his rebellion against Maximilian of Austria. William was also elected a Knight of the Golden Fleece in 1491. He became part of the court of Philip the Handsome in 1494, but did not accompany Philip on his first voyage to Spain in 1501–03. After Philip's death in 1506, William became part of the regency council and held chief responsibility for the finances of the Low Countries, as well as being supreme commander. He was confirmed in his tasks by Emperor Maximilian in 1510.

In 1509 William became chief tutor of young Archduke Charles as a replacement for Charles de Croÿ, prince of Chimay. William helped engineer Charles taking the title of Duke of Burgundy, and moved the nine-year-old Charles away from the court of Margaret of Austria so that he could better influence Charles. The young man was dependent on William—who plotted to have Charles declared to be of age at fifteen and appointed Grand Chamberlain—for advice. Charles named William part of his first council in 1515 and rewarded him with the Duchy of Sora and Arce, and Rocca Guglielma in 1516.

It was on William's advice that Charles sent his brother Ferdinand away from Spain. Ferdinand was loved by the people and Spanish-born, while Charles was distrusted as a foreigner. The fear was that Ferdinand might be used as a figurehead for a revolt.

William arranged for his namesake twenty-year-old nephew to be appointed Archbishop of Toledo. He was thus able to enjoy the immense revenues the see generated from afar. This appointment landed Charles in trouble later, as the appointment of an unqualified young foreigner offended the sensibilities of the Spanish and helped provoke the Revolt of the Comuneros.

William insisted that Charles become a candidate for the Imperial election in 1519 and was present at the Diet of Worms in 1521, where he was opposed to the violent persecution of Martin Luther and his followers. Charles broke with his advisors and went to war against France. William died in 1521 with the cause recorded as poison. Protestant followers of Martin Luther were blamed for this purported reprisal for the Edict of Worms which had been issued three days earlier on 25 May 1521.

William was married to Marie de Hamal, but the marriage was childless. He was succeeded by his other nephew Philippe II de Croÿ.

== Titles ==
William was also later titled Duke of Sora and Arce between 1516 and 1528, Baron of Roccaguglielma (all three in Kingdom of Naples, now in the Province of Frosinone), 1st count of Beaumont, 1st Marquess of Aarschot and Lord of Temse. Charles raised Beaumont to a county and Aarschot (which William inherited from his father in 1511) to a margraviate between 1517 and 1519. Other functions William acquired were:

- Grand-Bailli of Hainaut (1497–1503)
- Stadtholder of Namur (since 1503)
- Admiral of the Kingdom of Naples and Chief Admiral of all countries (in 1516)
- Chief of the Spanish treasury (contador mayor) (since 1517, though later sold to Alvaro de Zúñiga, duke of Béjar, for 30,000 ducats)

William de Croÿ House of Croÿ Born: 1458 Died: 28 May 1521
Regnal titles
Preceded by Engelbert II of Nassau	Governor of the Habsburg Netherlands; 1504–1507	Succeeded by Margaret of Austria
