= Montcornet Castle =

Castle in the commune of Montcornet

Coordinates: 49°49′46″N 4°37′39″E

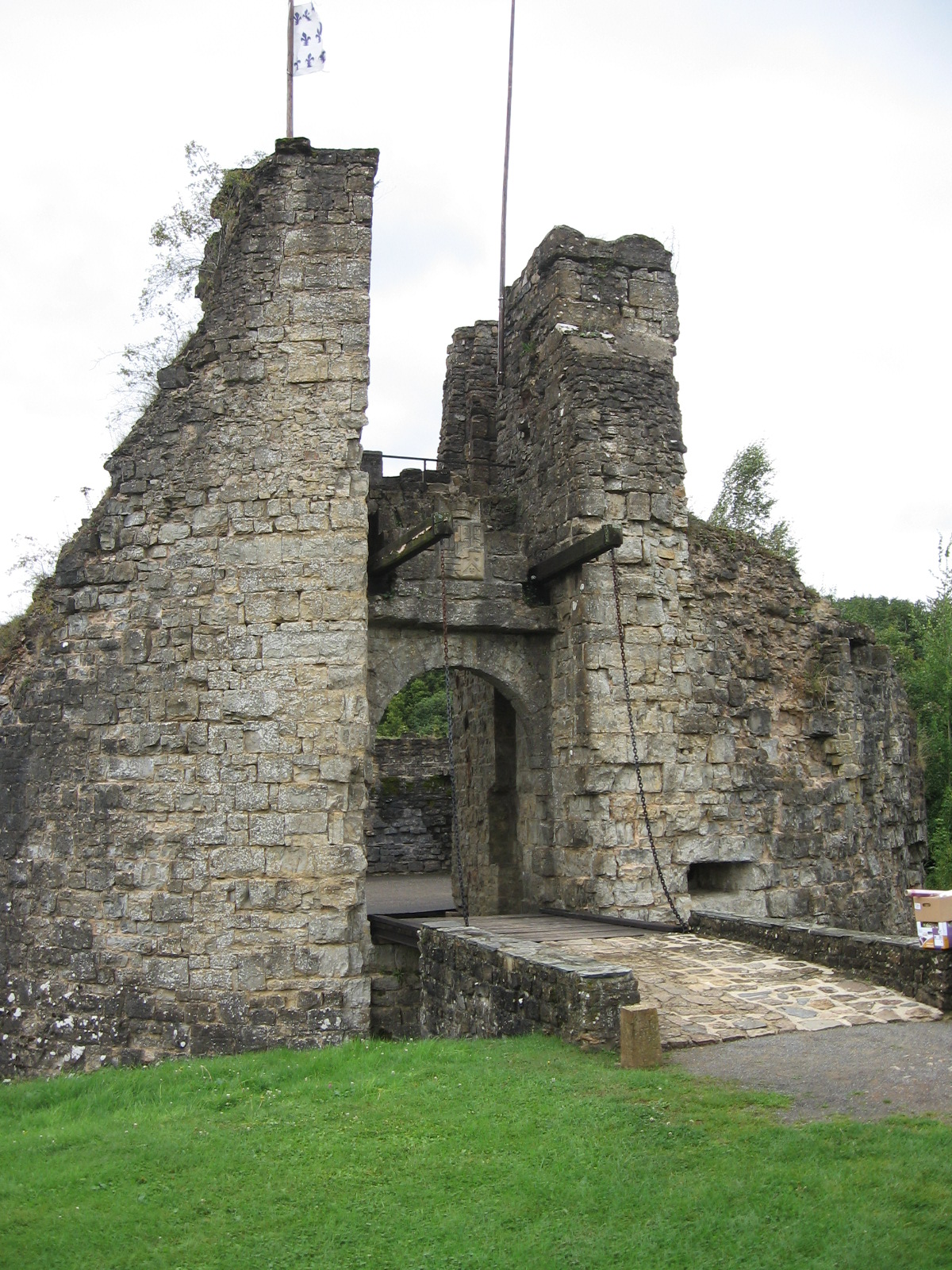
Entry and drawbridge of Montcornet

Montcornet Castle (French: Château de Montcornet) is a castle in the commune of Montcornet in the Ardennes département of France.

== History ==
The castle was built between the 11th and 12th centuries by the first occupants, the Montcornets. In the 13th and 14th centuries, the fortress passed to Miles de Noyer and then to the Mello family. In 1446, Antoine I de Croy repurchased the castle and rebuilt it almost completely. In 1613, Charles of Gonzaga, who was in the process of building the nearby Charleville, capital of the Principauté d'Arches, purchases the castle. From then it passed into the hands of the Meillerais, then finally to the duke of Aiguillon, who dismantled it around 1760. Only ruins survive today.

The artefacts excavated from the castle grounds—keys, currency, pottery, bones, etc.—are on display in a room of the castle.

Château de Montcornet has been listed as a monument historique by the French Ministry of Culture since 1926.

== Gallery ==
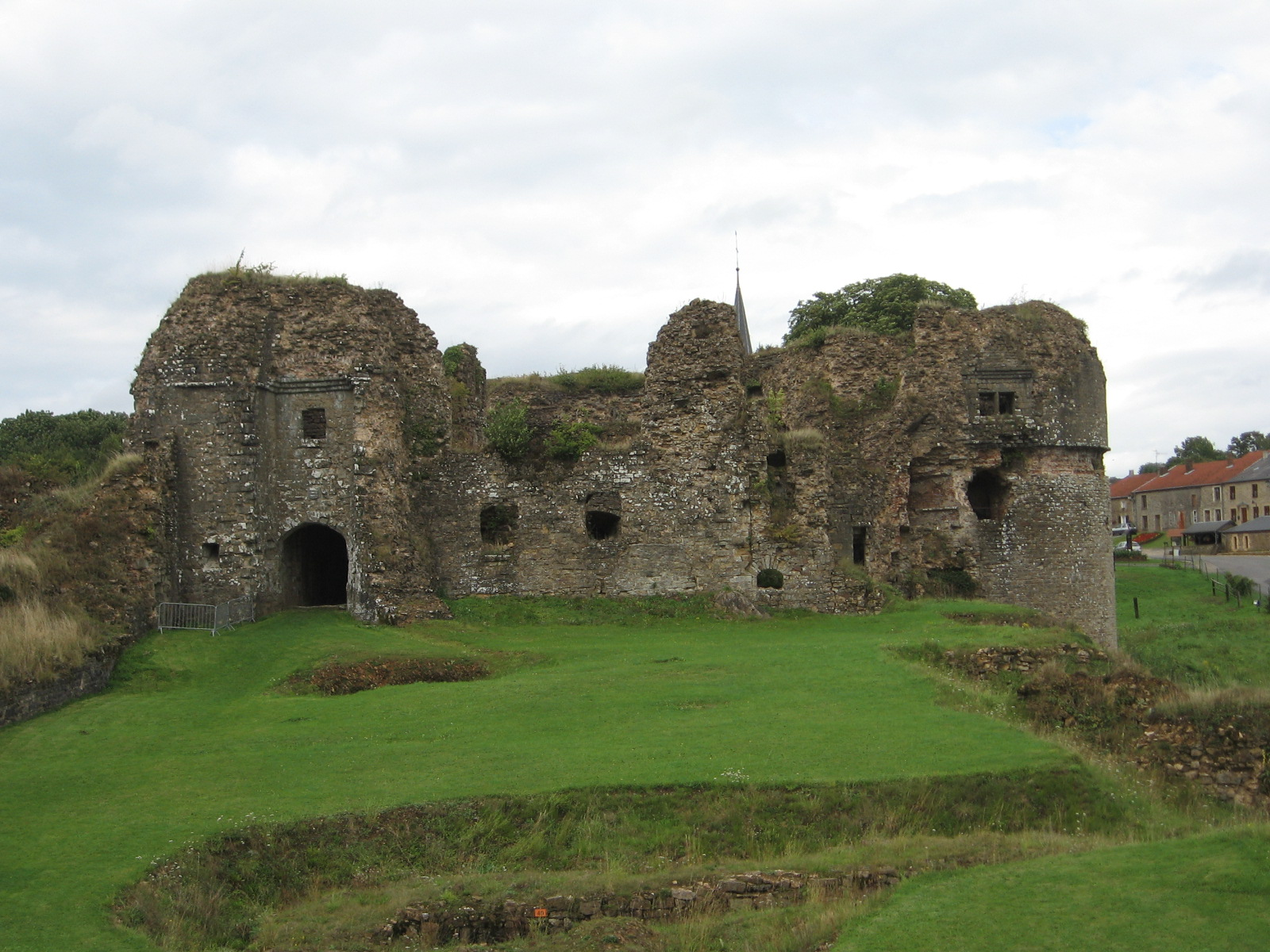
Haute cour

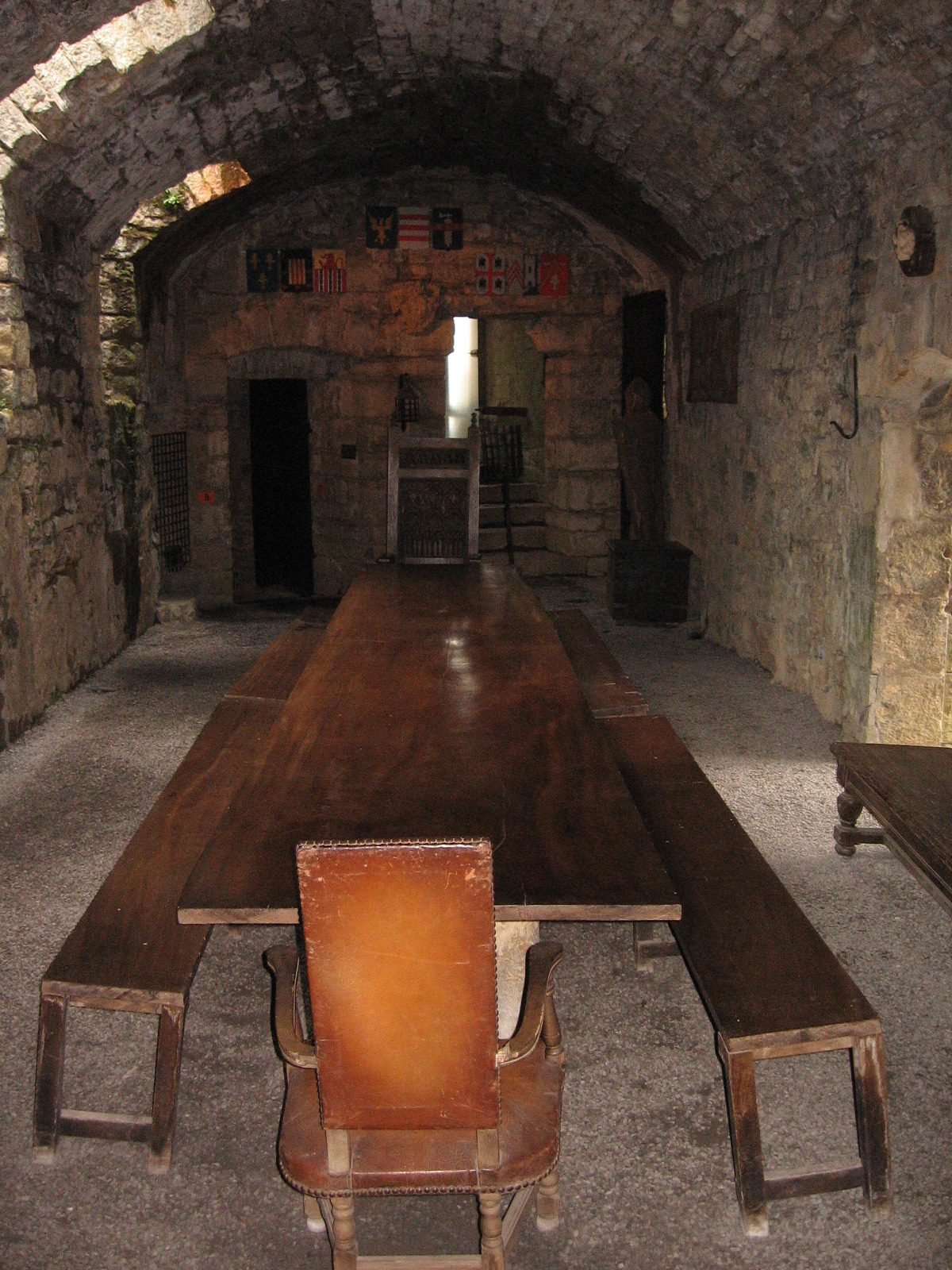
Salle d'armes

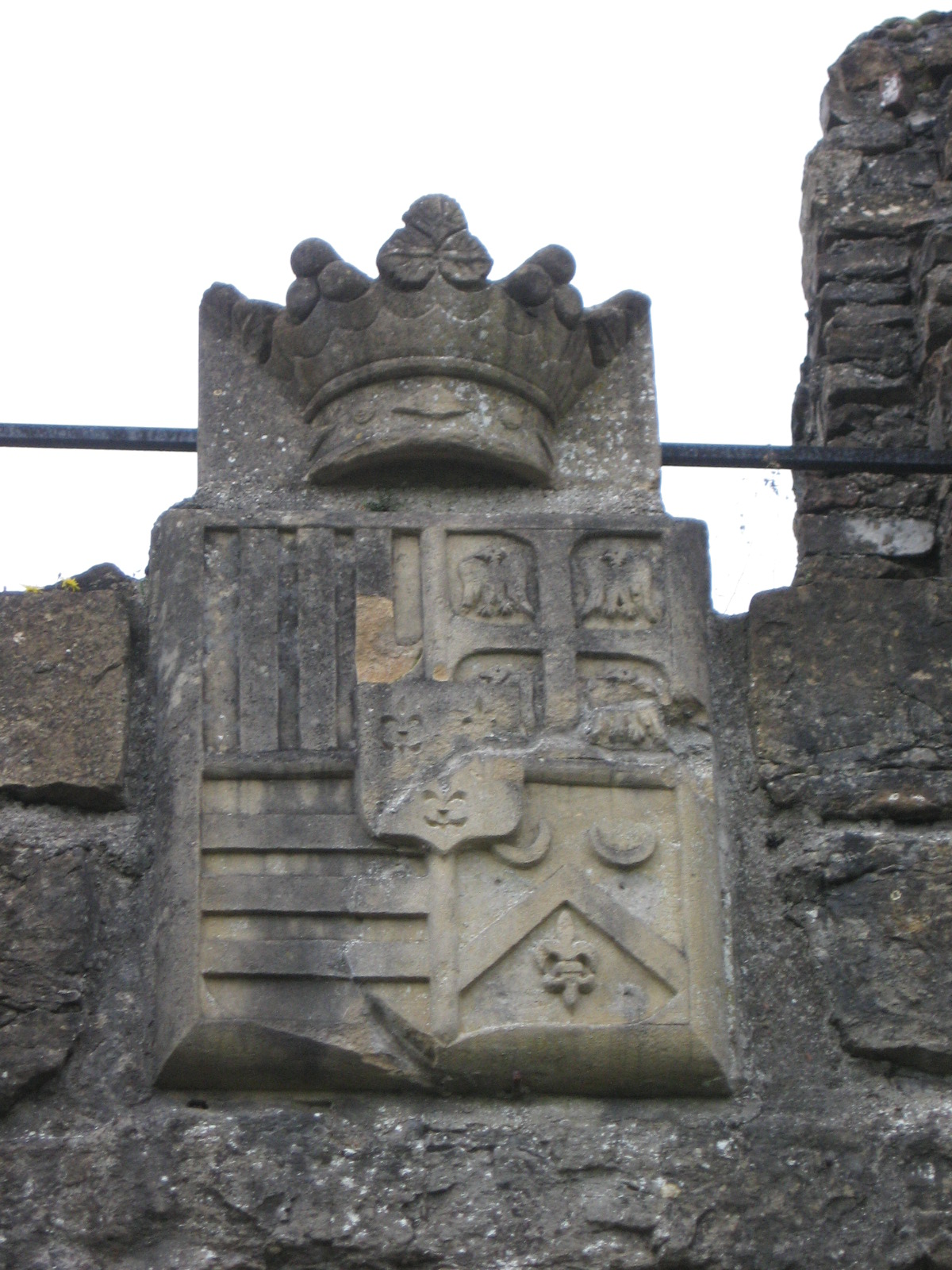
Montcornet coat of arms

== See also ==
- List of castles in France
