= Philippe II de Croÿ =

Belgian noble (1496–1549)

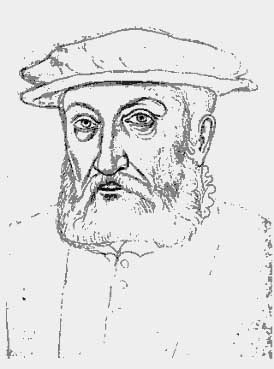
Philippe II de Croÿ (by Jacques Le Boucq).

Philippe II de Croÿ (1496–1549) was Seigneur de Croÿ, Count of Porcéan and first Duke of Aarschot and belonged to the powerful House of Croÿ. He was the eldest son of Henry de Croy, and Charlotte de Châteaubriand. Philippe succeeded to the County of Porcéan upon his father's death in 1514 and in 1516 became a member of the Order of the Golden Fleece. In 1521 he inherited the titles of his uncle William: (Note: Gerard Moreau mentions Philippe inheriting a major portion of his uncle William's lordships and titles, but doesn't mention any specifically.) amongst others, Duke of Soria and Archi, and Count of Beaumont.

Like his predecessors, Philippe was Governor of Hainault, but it is as Charles V's general that he is best remembered. He fought against the French in the Italian War of 1521–1526, and played an important role in the conquest of Tournai (1521).

On 1 April 1533 Charles V created Philippe ("our cousin", as he styled him) Duke of Aarschot and Grandee of Spain First Class. Earlier, he had become Marquess of Renty and exchanged the lordship of Longwy in Lorraine for that of Havré, which his descendants would develop as a family nest.

== Marriage and children ==
Philippe's first wife was a distant cousin, Anne de Croÿ (1502–1539), Princess of Chimay, daughter of Charles I de Croÿ and Louise d'Albret, Vicomtesse de Limoges. She was the great granddaughter of Jean II de Croÿ, Count of Chimay.

Philippe and Anne had:

- Charles II (1522–1551), 2nd Duke of Aarschot, 3rd Prince of Chimay, 3rd Count of Beaumont
- Louise (1524–1585), married Maximilian of Burgundy, Marquis de Vere et de Vlissingen (died 1558) and John of Burgundy, Lord of Sommelsdijk (died 1586).
- Philippe III (1526–1595), 3rd Duke of Aarschot, 4th Prince of Chimay, 4th Count of Beaumont
- William (1527–1565), 2nd Marquis de Renty, one daughter Anne de Croy d. 1609
- Antoine (1530–1530)
- Louis (1533–1533)

Nine years after Anna's death, Philippe married Anna of Lorraine (1522–1568), daughter of Antoine, Duke of Lorraine and widow of René of Châlon. They had one son, born after Philippe's death:

- Charles Philippe de Croÿ, Marquis d’Havré (1549–1613), had issue

== Sources ==
- Geevers, Liesbeth; Marini, Mirella, eds. (2015). Dynastic Identity in Early Modern Europe: Rulers, Aristocrats and the Formation of Identities. Ashgate Publishing.
- Israel, Jonathan I. (1997). Conflicts of Empires: Spain, the Low Countries and the Struggle for World Supremacy, 1585-1713. The Hambledon Press.
- Moreau, Gerard (1995). "Charles (I) de Croy". In Bietenholz, Peter G.; Deutscher, Thomas Brian (eds.). Contemporaries of Erasmus: A Biographical Register of the Renaissance and Reformation. Vol. 1: A-E. University of Toronto Press. pp. 363–364. ISBN 0-8020-2507-2.}
- Polt, J. H. R. (1989). "More on Valera's "Nescit Labi Virtus"". Romance Notes. 30 (2 Winter). University of North Carolina at Chapel Hill.
- De Remi, Philippe (2019). Gnarra, Irene (ed.). Philippe de Remi's La Manekine. Routledge.
- Sicking, Louis (2004). Neptune and the Netherlands: State, Economy, and War at Sea in the Renaissance. Brill.
