= Jean II de Croÿ =

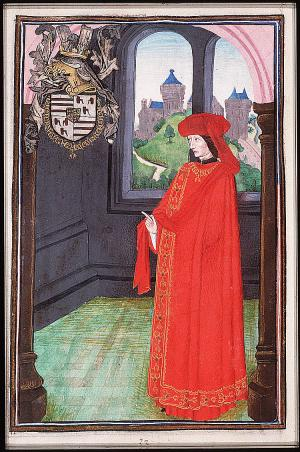
Jean II Croÿ as Knight in the Order off the Golden Fleece, 1473

Jean II de Croÿ (1390? – Valenciennes, 25 March 1473) was Count of Chimay and progenitor of the line of Croÿ-Solre. Jean belonged to the powerful House of Croÿ.

== Life ==
Jean was the second surviving son of Jean I de Croÿ and Marie de Craon. His elder brother was Antoine I de Croÿ. He was a prominent member of the Burgundian court. He governed Hainaut and Namur in the name of the Dukes of Burgundy as grand bailli de Hainaut. Jean's dominions were centred on the town of Chimay, of which he became the first count. In 1430, he was made one of the first Knights of the Order of the Golden Fleece.

Jean was godfather to Charles the Bold in 1433 and to the Dauphin in 1459. In 1435 he played an important part in the formation of the Congress of Arras. He was subsequently charged with bringing the city of Amiens under Burgundian control. In 1436, Jean commanded the Burgundian-Flemish army that besieged Calais and was blamed for the complete failure of the expedition. During the Revolt of Ghent (1449–1453), he lifted the siege of Oudenaarde and in 1453, he defeated William I of Brunswick-Wolfenbüttel at Thionville, securing the Duchy of Luxembourg for Burgundy.

Jean was also amongst those who took the Vow of the Pheasant in 1454. Jean had a great influence on Philip the Good, for which he was hated by Charles the Bold. When Charles the Bold came to power in 1465, he exiled Jean, as well as his son Philip I of Croÿ-Chimay and his brother Antoine I de Croÿ. Jean only reconciled with Charles in 1473, the year of his death.

== Marriage and children ==
Jean was the progenitor of the only line of the House of Croÿ extant today, that of Croÿ-Solre.

He married Marie of Lalaing (1390–1474) and had five children.

- Jacqueline (1430–1500), married in 1463 Jean IV de Nesle
- Philip de Croy-Chimay (Mons, 1430 – Bruges, 18 September 1482), lord of Quievrain, his successor
- Jacques (1436–1516), Bishop of Cambrai
- Michel de Croy, Seigneur de Sempy (died 1516), Order of the Golden Fleece
- Catherine (1440–1515), married Adrien de Brimeu who died in the Battle of Marignano (1515)

== Sources ==
- vanden Bemden, Yvette (2000). Les vitraux de la première moitié du 16e siècle conservés en Belgique (in French). Presses Universitaires de Namur.
- Guynemer, Paul (1912). La seigneurie d'Offémont (in French). Imprimerie du Progrès de l'Oise.
- Vaughan, Richard (2002a). Philip the Good. Boydell Press.
- Vaughan, Richard (2002b). Charles the Bold. Boydell Press.
