= Jean de Croÿ, Count of Solre =

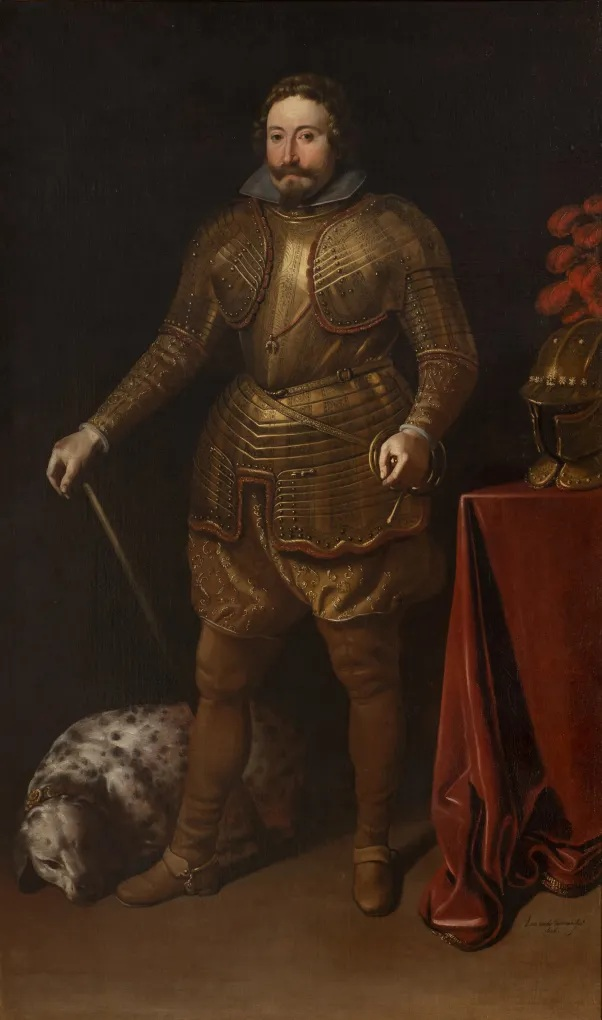
Jean de Croÿ, II Count of Solre (1620–1622) by Juan van der Hamen

Jean de Croÿ (14 November 1588—1638), count of Solre, baron of Molembaix and marquess of Renty, knight of the Golden Fleece, was a nobleman from the Low Countries who held high office under the Spanish Habsburgs.

== Life ==
Jean was born in 1588, the son of Philippe de Croÿ-Solre and Anne de Beaufort. After his mother's death, his father married Anne de Croÿ, widow of Emanuel Philibert de Lalaing. In 1608 Jean married his step-sister Jeanne de Lalaing, Anne de Croÿ's daughter from her first marriage. In 1614 he was appointed a knight of the Order of the Golden Fleece, and in 1616 chamberlain to Archduke Albert.

In the years 1619—1636 he undertook diplomatic missions in Poland, Germany and France on behalf of Philip IV of Spain, and in 1622—23 was acting high bailiff and captain-general of the County of Hainaut. In 1624 he was appointed captain of the royal guard in Spain, and a member of the Spanish council of state. In September 1627 he became a councillor on the Supreme Council of Flanders in Madrid. He died in Madrid in 1638.
