= Montcornet, Ardennes =

Montcornet
- Commune
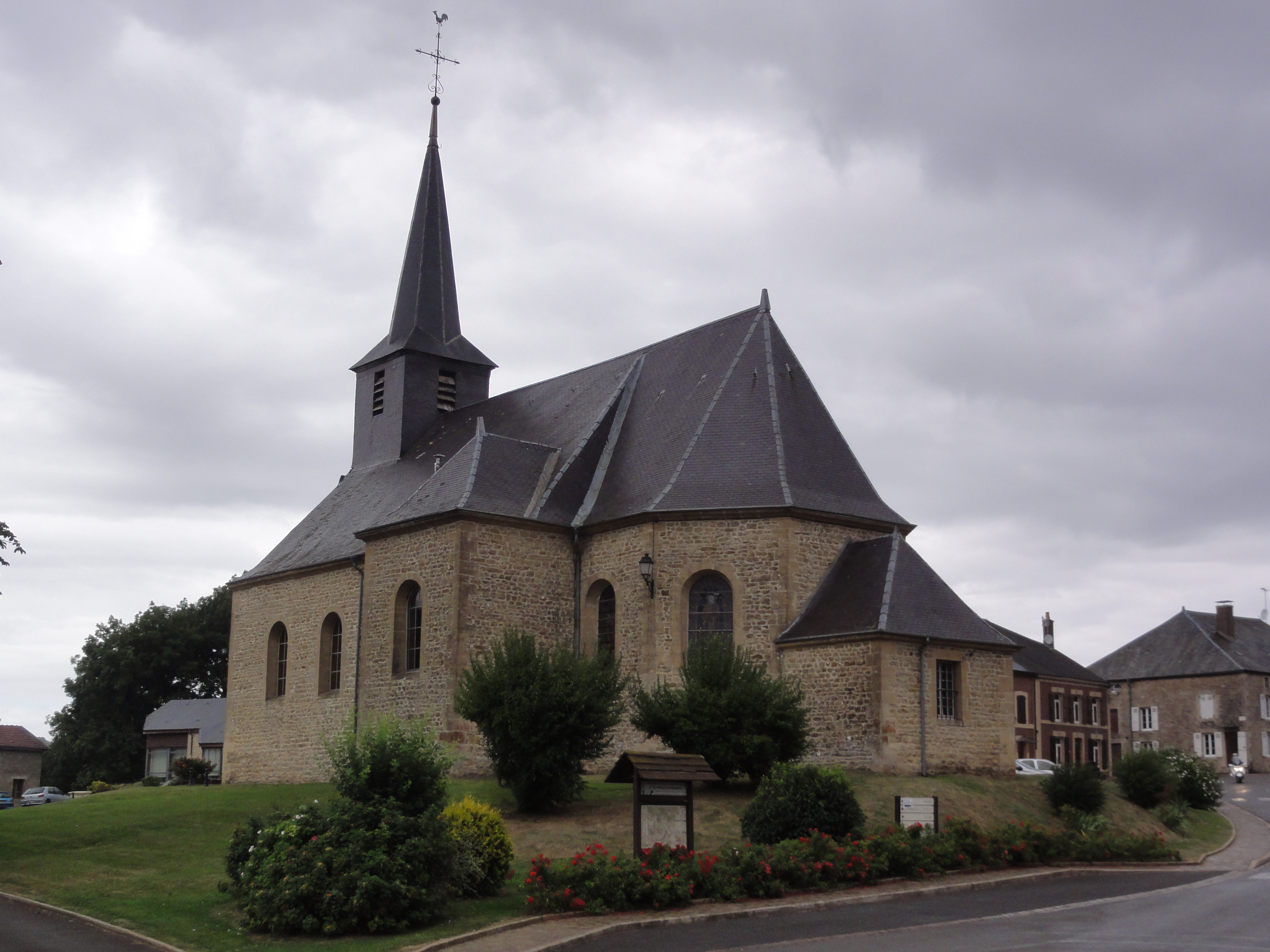
- The church in Montcornet

- Coat of arms
- Location of Montcornet
- Location within France Location within Grand Est
- Coordinates: 49°49′53″N 4°37′47″E
- Country: France
- Region: Grand Est
- Department: Ardennes
- Arrondissement: Charleville-Mézières
- Canton: Bogny-sur-Meuse

Government
  - Mayor (2020–2026): Régis Depaix
- Area^{1}: 11.51 km^{2} (4.44 sq mi)
- Elevation: 182 m (597 ft)
- Population (2023): 300
  - Density: 26/km^{2} (68/sq mi)
- Time zone: UTC+01:00 (CET)
  - Summer (DST): UTC+02:00 (CEST)
- INSEE/Postal code: 08297 /08090
- ^{1} French Land Register data, which excludes lakes, ponds, glaciers > 1 km^{2} (0.386 sq mi or 247 acres) and river estuaries.

Montcornet (French pronunciation: [mɔ̃kɔʁnɛ]) is a commune in the Ardennes department in northern France.

== Population ==
Historical population
Year	Pop.	±% p.a.
1968	230	—
1975	217	−0.83%
1982	215	−0.13%
1990	214	−0.06%
1999	218	+0.21%
2007	249	+1.68%
2012	316	+4.88%
2017	297	−1.23%
2023	300	+0.17%
Source: INSEE

== See also ==
- Communes of the Ardennes department
