= Château-Porcien =

- Commune
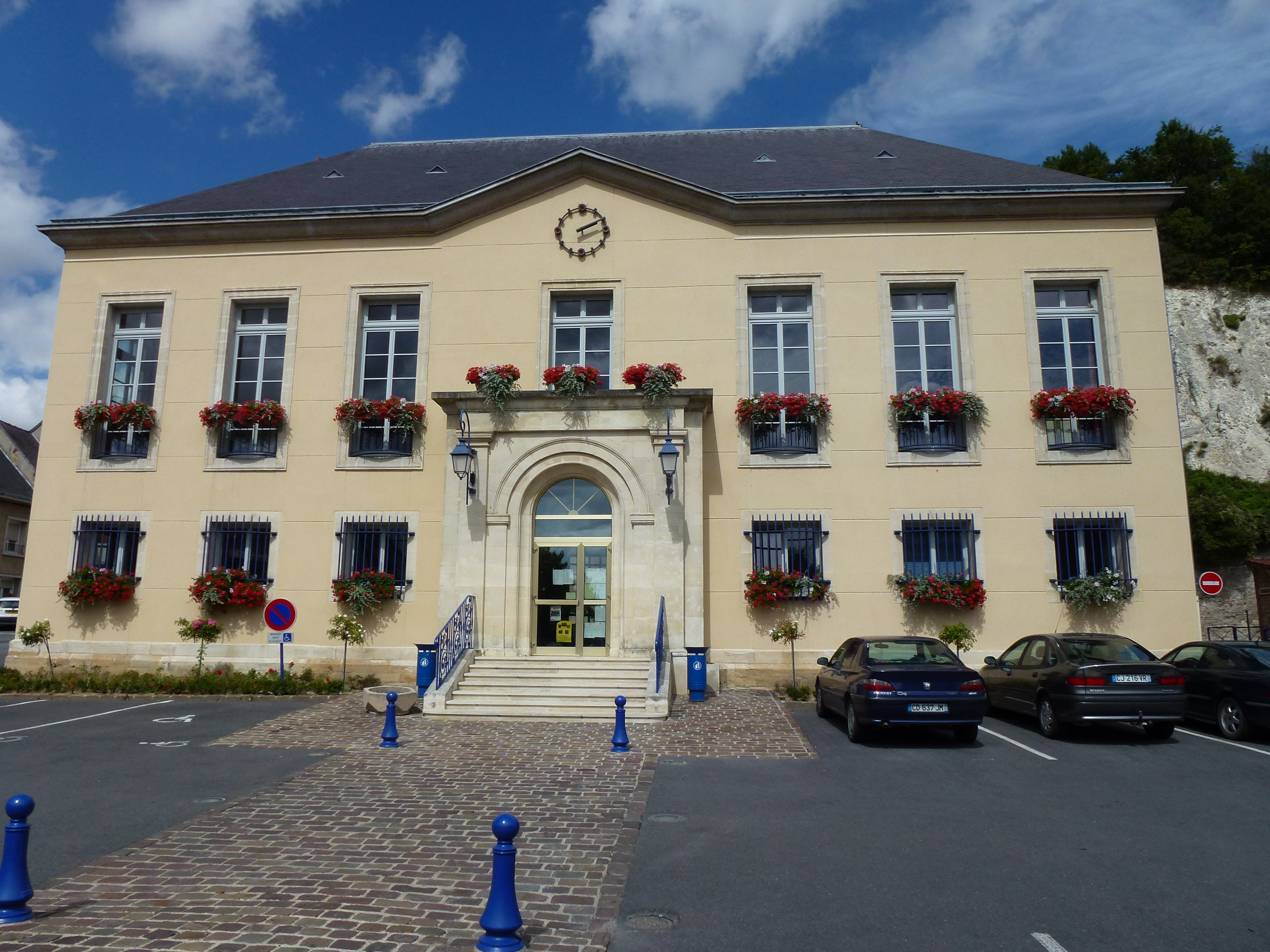
- The town hall in Château-Porcien

- Coat of arms
- Location of Château-Porcien
- Location within France Location within Grand Est
- Coordinates: 49°31′48″N 4°14′48″E
- Country: France
- Region: Grand Est
- Department: Ardennes
- Arrondissement: Rethel
- Canton: Château-Porcien

Government
  - Mayor (2020–2026): Didier Simon
- Area^{1}: 17.31 km^{2} (6.68 sq mi)
- Elevation: 71 m (233 ft)
- Population (2023): 1,285
  - Density: 74.23/km^{2} (192.3/sq mi)
- Time zone: UTC+01:00 (CET)
  - Summer (DST): UTC+02:00 (CEST)
- INSEE/Postal code: 08107 /08360
- ^{1} French Land Register data, which excludes lakes, ponds, glaciers > 1 km^{2} (0.386 sq mi or 247 acres) and river estuaries.

Château-Porcien (French pronunciation: [ʃɑto pɔʁsjɛ̃]) is a commune in the Ardennes department in northern France.

== Population ==
Historical population
Year	Pop.	±% p.a.
1968	1,006	—
1975	1,156	+2.01%
1982	1,281	+1.48%
1990	1,302	+0.20%
1999	1,285	−0.15%
2007	1,400	+1.08%
2012	1,417	+0.24%
2017	1,367	−0.72%
2023	1,285	−1.03%
Source: INSEE

== See also ==
- Communes of the Ardennes department
