= Battle of Guinegate (1479) =

Battle between France and the Habsburg royals

Coordinates: 50.6081°N 2.2711°E

- Part of the War of the Burgundian Succession
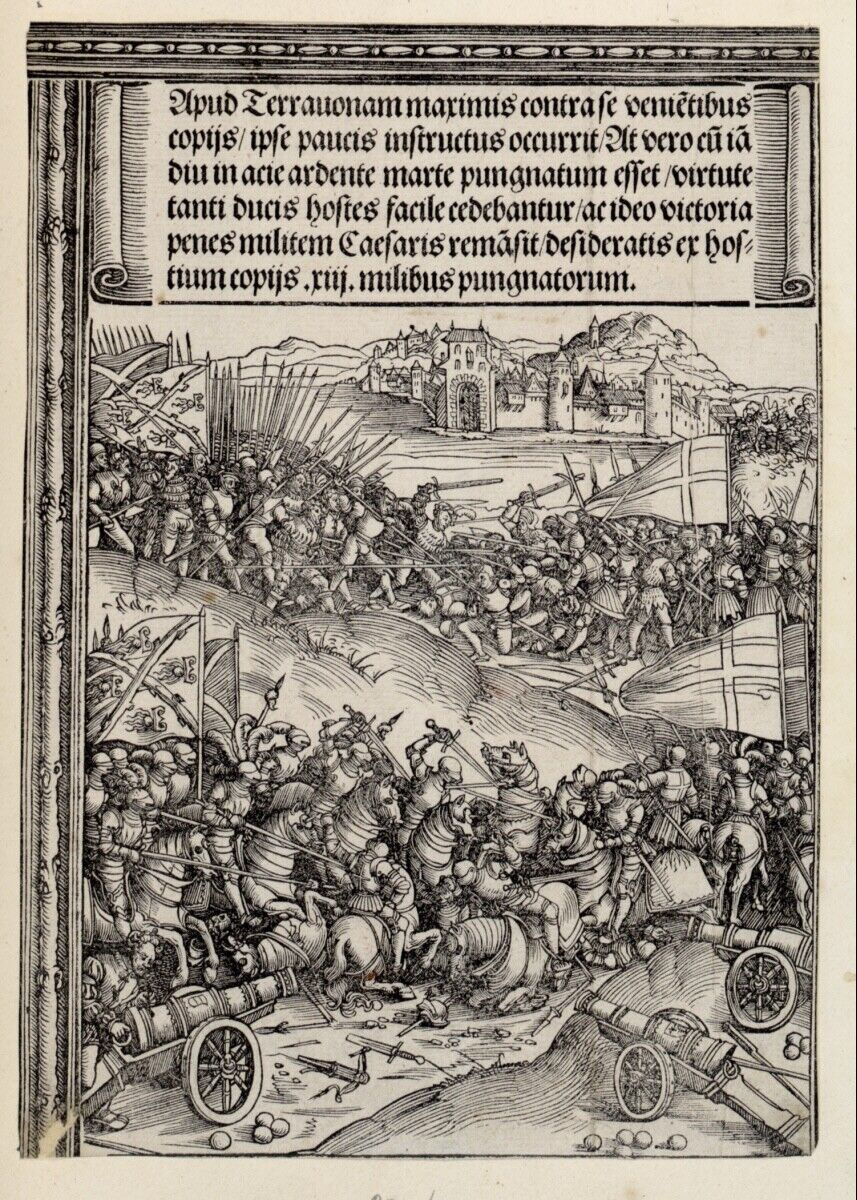
- Early 16th century depiction of the battle by Wolf Traut
Date	7 August 1479
Location	Guinegatte, County of Artois
Result	Burgundian victory

Belligerents
Valois	Burgundian State

Commanders and leaders
Philippe de Crèvecœur d'Esquerdes	Maximilian I of Habsburg, Duke of Burgundy; Engelbert of Nassau; Jacques of Savoy, Count of Romont; Philip of Cleves, Lord of Ravenstein

Strength
c. 16,000 (not counting cannoneers)–c. 20,000 men in total 4,000 (2,000 heavy cavalry and 2,000 light cavalry)–10,800 cavalry 8,000 regular archers 12,000 infantry (including archers; mounted archers also fought on foot)	c. 16,000–c. 23,000 men in total 1,650 (825 heavy cavalry plus 825 light cavalry)–4,950 cavalry (including mounted archers); 300 English archers plus 3,000 archers, crossbowmen, arquebusiers and coleuvriniers. c. 11,000 pikemen; or 11,000 foot soldiers with close-combat weapons; (Note: "[...] the Burgundian army was probably stronger by a few thousand men than the French army, even if we include in the latter force the garrison of Thérouanne, 4,000 men, who threatened the rear of the Burgundians during the battle.")or 2,475 lance infantry (including archers) and an unspecified number of contingents of Flemish militia pikemen

Casualties and losses
1,300 dead (probably exaggerated)	5,000 dead

The First Battle of Guinegate took place on 7 August 1479. King Louis XI's French troops, led by Philippe de Crèvecœur d'Esquerdes (who had been a commander under Charles the Bold but defected to the French side after the latter's death in 1477), were defeated by the Burgundians, led by Duke (later Emperor) Maximilian I of Habsburg. The battle was the first in which the innovative Swiss pike square formation was used by a power that was not natively Swiss.

== Background ==
Charles the Bold, the last Duke of Burgundy, had been killed at the Battle of Nancy on 5 January 1477. King Louis XI immediately adjudicated his territories to be recovered fiefs of the Kingdom of France and campaigned in the Counties of Artois, Flanders and Hainaut and the Duchy of Burgundy. Nevertheless, Charles' only heir, Mary of Burgundy, on 19 August had married Archduke Maximilian, who, determined to protect the Burgundian inheritance, organised troops in the Burgundian Netherlands and marched against the French army.

Many of the troops who had been victorious at the Battle of Nancy had been provided by the Lower League. Among the troops was a sizable contingent of Swiss soldiers, which had been a part of the victorious army of Lorraine, and its salient characteristic was its method of fighting. Formed up in pike squares, the Swiss mercenaries made themselves and their method of warfare felt far beyond their borders. The notable characteristic of the pike squares was the difficulty with which the traditional cavalry of the day had in penetrating it.

The failure at Nancy and its reasons had not escaped Jacques of Savoy, Count of Romont, who had fought under the Archduke's father-in-law, Charles, at the Battle of Nancy. He was now fighting on the side of the Archduke and urged him to adopt a similar method of fighting with his 11,000 foot troops. According to Delbruck, as the 20-year-old Maximilian was still young, inexperienced and in the territories of his wife, it was Romont, the count of Romont, who formed up the Flemish infantry in the Swiss manner.

Also, in the same area, a formation similar to that of the Swiss had been used by Flemish rebels against the French knights successfully in the 1302 Battle of the Golden Spurs, but at Roosebeke in 1382, the combat method failed in the plain terrain, as opposed to the Swiss mountainous terrain.

Jelle Haemers and Gerhard Benecke on the other hand note that the Archduke took personal control of military operations himself, like an impresario, although he got help from advisors, especially regarding financial matters, which he also controlled during the time of war. (Note: "On the battlefield Maximilian of Austria acted like a true ‘impresario of war ’. James Tracy anointed emperor Charles V with this title, which means a 'director' of war. An impresario, such as Maximilian, sets the objectives for the military campaign, establishes numerical quotas and guidelines for the recruitment of the troops, coordinates battles, which he also attends in person, and adjusts troop movements as necessary. Of course, when exercising his impresarial mastery, the duke received help from his advisors, especially concerning financial matters".)

== Armies ==
Both sides met at the village of Guinegatte in the County of Artois, and their armies gathered into formation. The cavalry was stationed on the flanks, and the infantry was positioned in the centre. However, both sides otherwise diverged significantly in the character of their armies.

=== French dispositions ===
The French, whose infantry consisted primarily of archers, positioned them between their cavalry, which was composed of gendarmes and coutiliers.

=== Burgundian dispositions ===
The Archduke was employing Burgundians in his army and had formed his infantry into two deep large squares. One square was commanded by Count Engelbert of Nassau, who had also fought under the Archduke's father-in-law at Nancy. The other square was commanded by the Count of Romont.

== Battle ==
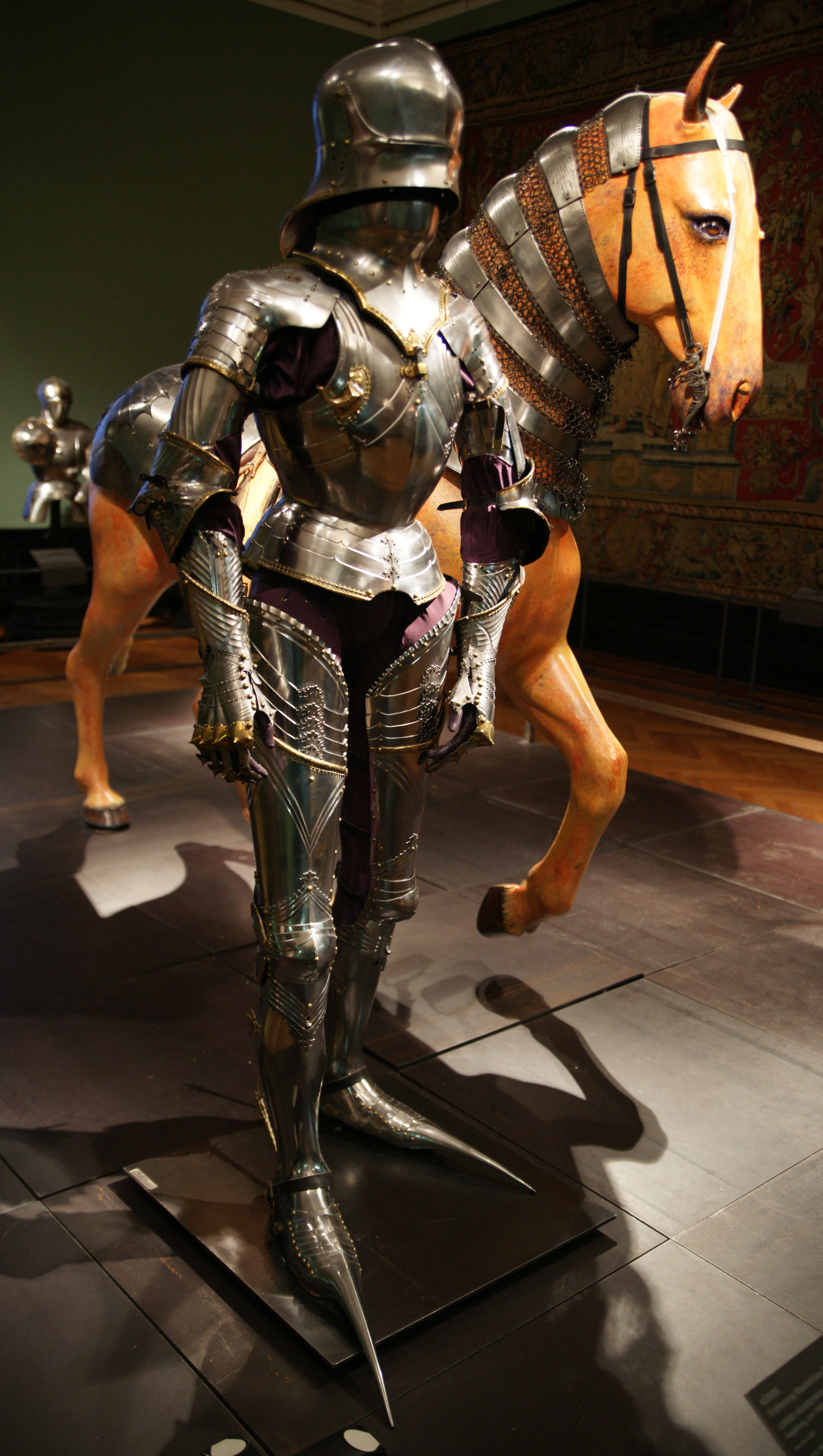
HJRK A 60 – Gothic-style plate armour, likely wore by Maximilian at Guinegate, under a luxurious crimson satin robe, according to Pierre Terjanian

Initially, it was Philip of Cleves, who was Mary of Burgundy's cousin and Maximilian's right-hand man, who commanded the cavalry. When they were crossing the Lys though, Philip's horse got out of control, pushing him ahead of his man. Maximilian witnessed Philip's fall and thought he was dead. In reality, both Philip and his horse survived. Philip's sumptuous attire and magnificent horse prompted the French to think that he was Maximilian. Consequently, Philip was chased by one hundred French troops for 9 km until they reached the Aire. Philip stayed there for that night.

As the battle started, Lord des Cordes forced back the knights within the left infantry square and also captured the Burgundian artillery drawn up on that flank. The Burgundian left flank under the command of Nassau was in a perilous state. In addition to being attacked from the front, it was also drawing fire on its flank from the captured artillery. However, instead of following up their advantage on the left flank, the French knights on the left chased after the Burgundian knights who were fleeing from the field and thereby gave up their advantage. Meanwhile, on the other flank, commanded by Maximilian and Romont, the Burgundians held fast and slowly fought their way forward against the French, who directed their efforts against the main line of the Burgundians and turned their artillery pieces against them. The momentum of the French was lost. After a long duration of indecisive fighting, the Burgundian side launched a counter-attack, which forced the French to retreat at 8:00 p.m. towards Hesdin. The Burgundian knights rode back on the battlefield and took revenge on their French counterparts, who fled the battlefield.

According to Delbruck, Maximilian did not fight with the knights but stood with his pikemen from the beginning. These nobles were positioned in the first ranks of the squares. The writings of de But and others make a point that the pikemen were the primary factor in the repulse of the French attack, with Maximilian's personal bravery playing a notable role. Delbruck opines that the flank protection accomplished by the knights on at least one side of the squares played a role as well. According to Verbruggen, the French strong cavalry at first repelled the Burgundian cavalry, which consisted of 825 lances. Maximilian then dismounted, together with 500 of his nobles, who fought with the foot troops and provided the formation and leadership.

In the battle, Maximilian risked his life to rescue Charles I de Croÿ from a perilous situation.

Benecke and Querengässer note that Maximilian incorporated Hussite War tactics, with the use of wagon forts, into the battle.

== Aftermath ==
According to the French historian Bertrand Schnerb, the battle was not decisive in determining the Burgundy war. Despite winning, Maximilian had to abandon the siege of Thérouanne and disband his army either because the Netherlanders did not want him to become too strong or because his treasury was empty. Nevertheless, the victory confirmed the position of Maximilian as the protector of Burgundian heritance. The battle was a critical point in military history, though, since the Burgundian pikemen were the precursors of the Landsknechte, and the French derived the momentum for military reform from their loss. According to the Belgian historian Jelle Haemers, after Guinegate, the war against France was no longer defensive in nature "but had instead become an offensive drive to recapture territory lost in 1477." The Estates in Flanders did not want to support Maximilian financially in that endeavour. Meanwhile, trying to avoid another direct military confrontation, Louis XI adopted a broader strategy in encouraging the Burgundians' internal opponents, which successfully forced Maximilian to split his forces in different directions, abandon plans to recapture territories and search for new allies. (Note: "Hoping to avoid another direct military confrontation with Maximilian, Louis XI adopted a new, ‘broad’ strategy. While making truce agreements to avoid military conflict, he encouraged internal opponents of the Burgundian-Habsburg court, supporting the opposition in the Duchy of Ghelders and a rebellion of nobles in Luxembourg.") The efforts of Maximilian and Margaret of York led to the rupture between Edward IV and Louis XI.

After the battle, Maximilian began to recruit mercenaries and to train them in a format that took inspiration from the Swiss model. From 1482, they gradually became known as the Landsknechte. Also, the fact that he had fought together with the infantry in the first ranks during the battle and thus obliged his nobles to do the same was also considered revolutionary. The Landsknechte was not considered just a supporting arm since an esprit-de-corps developed and distinguished them from other mercenaries.

In 1482, Maximilian was forced to cede Artois and Burgundy itself (except the County of Charolais) to Louis XI, according to the Treaty of Arras, after Mary of Burgundy had died from a riding accident. The Habsburgs did not gain back the territories until the Treaty of Senlis (1493).

== Bibliography ==
- Delbruck, Hans (1985). History of the Art of War Volume IV: The Dawn of Modern Warfare. Lincoln: University of Nebraska Press. pp. 4–7. ISBN 0-8032-6586-7.
- Haemers, Jelle (2009). For the Common Good: State Power and Urban Revolts in the Reign of Mary of Burgundy, (1477–1482). Isd. ISBN 978-2-503-52986-8.
- Schnerb, Bertrand (2010). "Guinegate, Battle of". In Rogers, Clifford J. (ed.). The Oxford Encyclopedia of Medieval Warfare and Military Technology. Vol. 2. Oxford University Press. pp. 230–231. ISBN 978-0195334036.
- Terjanian, Pierre, ed. (2019). The Last Knight: The Art, Armor, and Ambition of Maximilian I. Metropolitan Museum of Art. ISBN 978-1588396747.
- Verbruggen, J.F. (2002). "Flemish Urban Militias Against French Cavalry Armies In The Fourteenth And Fifteenth Centuries". Journal of Medieval Military History. Boydell Press. pp. 145–156. ISBN 978-0851159096.

== See also ==
- Battle of Guinegate (1513)
