= St. Paul's Abbey, Utrecht =

Monastery in Utrecht, Netherlands

Coordinates: 52.0892°N 5.1231°E

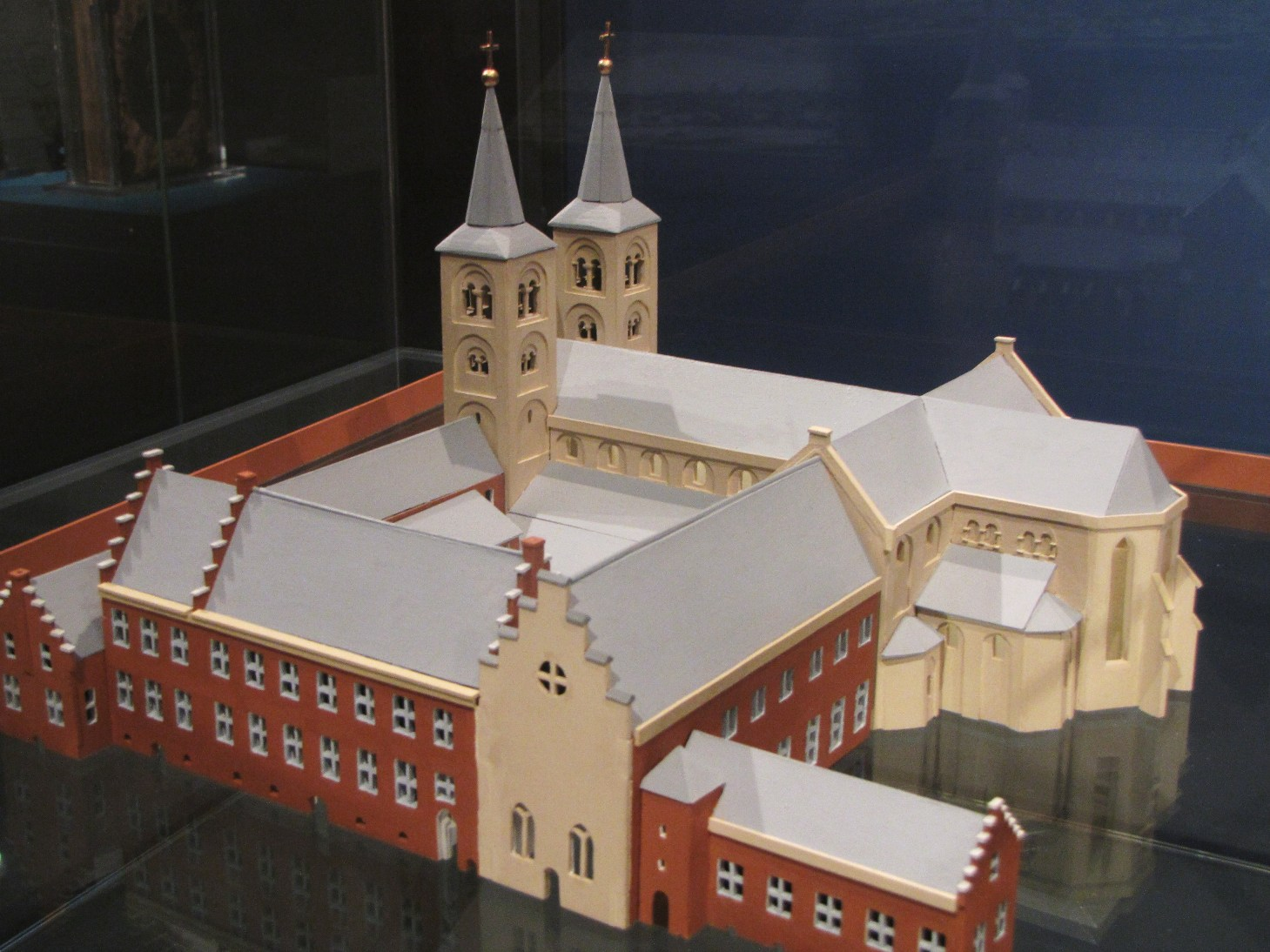
St. Paul's Abbey in the sixteenth century. Model by G.M.J. Engelbregt and J.B.A. Terlingen (2010)

St. Paul's Abbey was a monastery in Utrecht in the Netherlands. In 1580 it was the second oldest monastery in the Netherlands, second only to Egmond Abbey in the north.

== History ==
The origins of the abbey went back to the foundation, by Bishop Afsried in approximately 1000, of a monastery at Hohorst near Leusden. In approximately 1020 the monastery adopted the Rule of Saint Benedict. By 1050 the Monastery, now under Bishop Bernold, had relocated to Utrecht, which was already the administrative and ecclesiastical focus of an important imperial prince-bishopric. Here they settled directly to the south of what is now the city's cathedral.

Dedicated to the Apostle Paul, the abbey church was consecrated on 26 June 1050. Architecturally the church was closely related to the nearby St. Peter's Church, built around the same time. St. Paul's Abbey church was a Romanesque building with a conventional three-part nave (incorporating a side aisle on each side of the main nave). It was constructed from tuff stone and featured twin towers at its west end.

During the course of the Reformation the abbey was deconsecrated. In 1595 the Court of Utrecht was housed in the monastery buildings, while the abbey church was transferred to the religious community of St. Salvator, whose own church had been demolished in 1587/88. Most of the nave of the church was demolished in 1707, and the choir met the same fate in 1804. Today all that survives of the church is a section of transept wall, integrated into the row of substantial houses that now lines the Hofpoort Street. The site of the monastery is now the location of the Utrecht Archives.
