= St. Salvator's Church, Utrecht =

Former Catholic Church in Utrecht

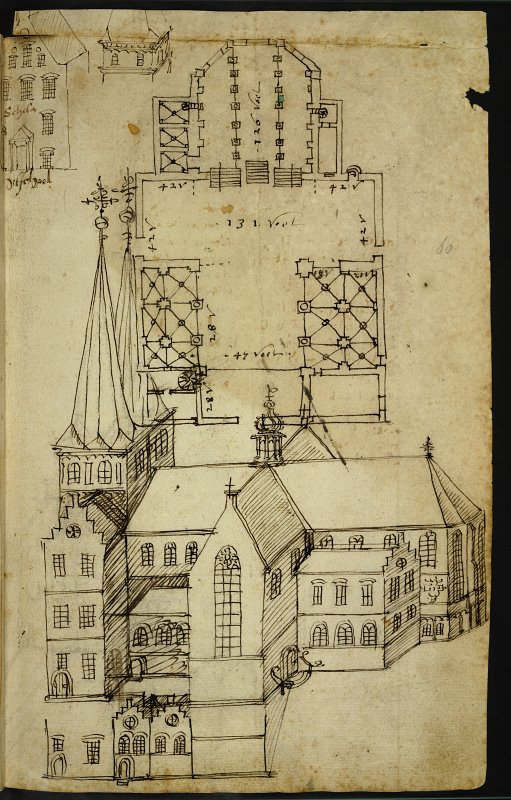
- (1615)

Religion
- Affiliation: Catholic Church
- Status: demolished

Location
- Location: Utrecht, Netherlands
- Interactive map of St. Salvator's Church, Utrecht
- Coordinates: 52.0903°N 5.1217°E

Architecture
- Materials: Tuff

The Sint-Salvator church (also called the Old-Munster church) was one of five Catholic Church collegiate churches in Utrecht, Netherlands, before the Protestant Reformation. The others were St. Martin's Cathedral (the present-day Dom Church), St. Peter's Church, St. John's church and St. Mary's church. The church building was situated on the present-day Domplein and was demolished during the Protestant Reformation, after the 1587 outlawing of Catholicism in the Dutch Republic.

== The first St. Salvator church ==
The exact history of first church building is not known but it was possibly built c. 695 and its presence was definitely established by 724. It was established by Willibrord, after he had received his mission from Pope Sergius I. The patron saint of the church, Salvator, is a possible reference to the Basilica of St. John Lateran, the ecclesiastical seat of the Pope and the mother church of the Catholic Church, as this church was at first also dedicated to St. Salvator. The name Salvator means savior and is a direct reference to Jesus the Savior.

During World War II, the former church building location was subject to an archaeological excavation. At the site of the former crossing, on the axis of the church, wall remnants and limestone sarcophagi were found. From the positioning of the remnants it was concluded that the eastern annex of the church had been found. By studying the groundplan of the second church which included a very broad and extremely short nave and a heavy tower, the dimensions of the connecting hall were deduced. The original church was a 12 by 18 metres (39 ft × 59 ft) rectangular single-nave building with an attached 9 by 12 metres (30 ft × 39 ft) rectangular annex on the east side. The excavation showed that the annex, which contained many tombs within its walls, may have been a grave chapel and possibly a choir.

The St. Salvator church was located southwest of a second small church building, known as the Holy-Cross chapel, which was likely the original St. Martin's church. That small church building was demolished in 1826. Until the 10th century, these two churches formed a double cathedral building but it is not clear whether both church functioned as a cathedral. The bishop's cathedra was installed, c. 750, in St. Martin's church, the direct predecessor of the later Dom Church, which from then on was known as St. Martin's Cathedral.

== Restoration and rebuilding in later times ==
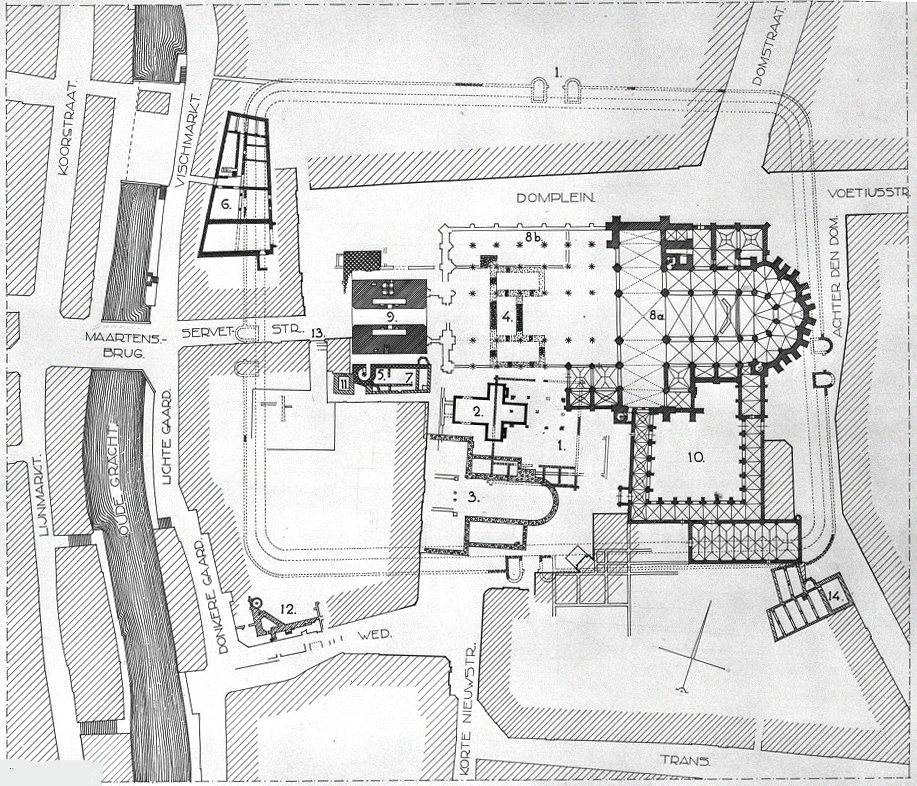
Map of the cathedral square in Utrecht showing Roman and medieval construction. St. Salvator is labeled 3.

The church was restored and possibly expanded during the episcopate of bishop Balderic of Utrecht (918-976). What exactly was done is not clear. A new grave-room might have been added to the eastern side. Balderic most likely paid more attention to the construction of the St. Martin's Cathedral to replace the old one. Under Balderic's third successor, Ansfried of Utrecht (995-1010), the church was largely rebuilt. The hall was cut into two. On the western half a westwork was erected after the example of the westwork at the Palatine Chapel in Aachen. The eastern half was transformed into a basilic layout by adding aisles. The eastern annex choir was maintained. In this form, the church may have acted as the bishopric's palatine church. (Note: Palatine churches and chapels belong to, imperial, royal, or private palaces and castles.) Similar churches were also built elsewhere from around 1000. They served to represent the bishop and his court.

Bishop Bernold made an end to the status of palatine church. The St. Salvator church was reformed into a chapter church, and the St. Martin's church was upgraded to cathedral status, becoming the seat of the bishop of Utrecht. Bernold and his successor William I adjusted the St. Salvator church to its new function, once more modifying and expanding it. The old eastern annex was taken down and replaced by a transept, whereby the eastern side received a prestigious, very deep, three-sided closed choir. Below this choir was a spacious crypt, that was accessible through side-chapels at the sides of the choir. Its layout corresponded to the other churches Bernold had built. The only difference, the extremely deep choir, seemed to be a reference to the special status of the church as burial place for the first bishops of Utrecht, amongst them Saint Boniface (who had never been bishop of Utrecht but was considered as such in medieval times).

The main altar was at first dedicated to Christ the Savior. The altar at the northern side-chapel was dedicated to Mary, and the southern side-chapel to John the Baptist. Together these altars represented the crucifixion and salvation of Christ. The main altar was also dedicated to Boniface, who had died as a martyr in 754 at Dokkum. Below the high altar, in the crypt, there was an altar dedicated to Saint Stephen, the first Christian protomartyr. Bishop Frederick of Utrecht, who was murdered in the church in 835, according to legend for his criticism of Empress Judith of Bavaria, was buried in front of this altar.

Around this time the St. Salvator church was designated a collegiate church with its own chapter and immunity from civil law in favor of canon law. This immunity also extended to the houses of the canons and the Holy-Cross chapel, which, as stated above, can be identified as the original St. Martin's church, and was eventually rebuilt as a cathedral by Bishop Balderic of Utrecht.

In 1131 and 1253 the church building was damaged by fire, but restored in both cases.

== The final church ==
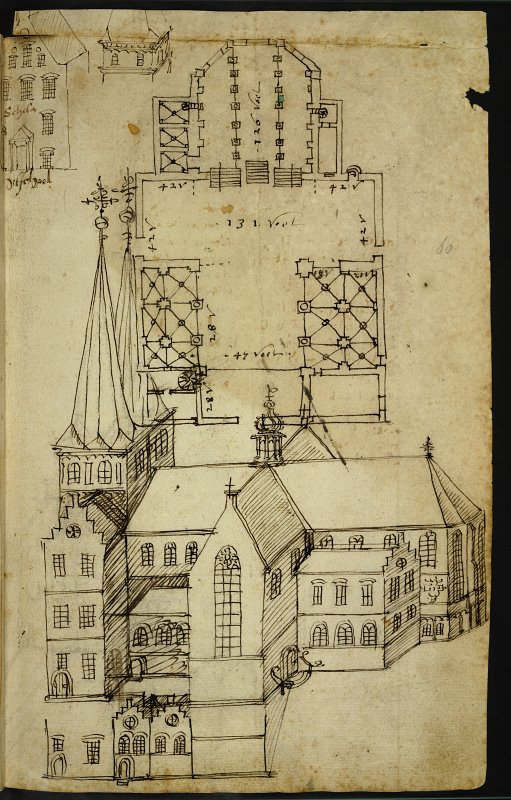
Sint-Salvatorkerk, drawing made around 1615 by Aernout van Buchel

In its final form, the St. Salvator church was a Tuff-stone basilica with a deep choir, a transept and short nave, and a westwork with two towers. While the 10th-century nave and westwork, and 11th-century choir and transept were Romanesque, the church was later adapted to the Gothic style. Several new structures were also built, such as a school at the southern side of the tower and a library on the southern side of the choir.

A map and construction drawings of the church in its final form were made by Aernout van Buchel. These drawings, which have been preserved, were made either shortly before or after the demolition of the church in 1587-1588. Another source is a description made by Canon Jan Mersman, in 1592, of the demolished church. Not much remains of the church; most of its foundation had been removed. Today one can see the outlines of the choir and part of the transept in the paving of the Domplein, the square in front of the Dom Church.

== Bibliography ==
- Stöver, Reitze J. (1997). De Salvator- of Oudmunsterkerk te Utrecht : stichtingsmonument van het bisdom Utrecht. Clavis kunsthistorische monografieën (in Dutch). Vol. 16. Utrecht: Clavis. ISBN 9789075616040.
