= Aernout van Buchel =

Aernout van Buchel (Latinised: Arnoldus Buchelius) (Utrecht, 1565 – Utrecht, 15 July 1641) was a Dutch antiquarian and humanist, specialising in genealogy and heraldry.

== Life ==
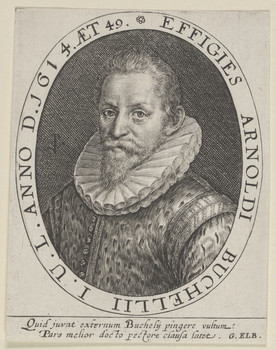
Arnoldus Buchellius, 1614 (Crispin de Passe)

Buchel was the illegitimate child of a Canon of the St. Peter's Church in Utrecht. He studied in Leiden for several months, but in 1585 he continued his studies in France, where he made contacts with other learned men who were interested by Roman ruins, inscriptions and writings. He travelled to Rome, where he wrote an extensive account of the monuments and art that he saw in the city and elsewhere in Italy. These were included in Buchel’s Iter Italicum, which forms a part of his Commentarius rerum quotidianarum (Diary of daily things), which covers the years 1560 through 1599. Especially interesting within the Iter Italicum is the selection of drawings that Buchel made, many of which are based on earlier prints. One example is his drawing of the Sarcophagus of Constantia, which resembles an illustration from Bartolomeo Marliani’s travel guide Antiquae Romae topographia, first published in 1538. Marliani’s illustration is based in turn on an etching and engraving by Ambrosius Brambilla, published by Claudio Duchetti in 1582 in the Speculum Romanae Magnificentiae (Mirror of Roman Magnificence). In 1588, Buchel returned to Utrecht.

In response to the demolishing of buildings and destruction of works of art after the Protestant Reformation, van Buchel started writing and drawing threatened inscriptions, tombstones, arms boards and other noteworthy items with the aim of preserving their memory before they were lost to the destruction. The only remaining drawings and description of the lost St. Salvator's Church in Utrecht were made by van Buchel. He put together a number of manuscripts that, together, form a treasure of immeasurable worth for research into lost buildings and inventories.

Buchel hardly published anything during his life. His book about the bishops of Utrecht, published posthumously, is still seen as a standard work on the subject. During his life he was a respected scholar, and with Petrus Scriverius one of the first antiquaries of the Netherlands.

== Works ==
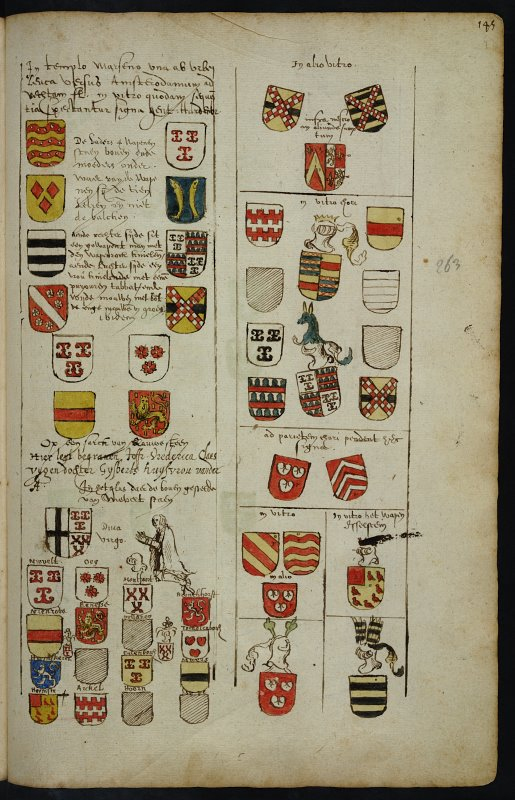
Page from the Monumenta by Aernout van Buchel (source: The Utrecht Archive)

- Perhaps his most lengthy work, his diary, or Diarium was first published in 1907 The transcription in Latin is "Commentarius rerum quotidianarum, in quo, praeter itinera diversarum regionum, urbium, oppidorumque situs, antiquitates, principes, instituta, mores, multa eorum quae tam inter publicos quam privatos contingere solent, occurrent exempla"
- The Monumenta passim in templis ac monasteriis Trajectinae urbis atque agri inventa, describes antiquities in the city of Utrecht and some villages in the area, such as Kortenhoef, Maarssen, Houten, Maartensdijk, Westbroek, Tienhoven en Breukelen. The manuscript is kept in the Utrecht Archive.
- The Inscriptiones monumentaque in templis et monasteriis Belgicis inventa, describes inscriptions in a number of settlements in the Sticht Utrecht, particularly Amersfoort, Holland (including mainly Leiden, but also The Hague, Delft, Amsterdam, and Rotterdam), and the Duchy of Brabant (including mainly Antwerp, but also Leuven and Brussels). The manuscript is kept in the University library in Utrecht.

== Literature ==
- Pollmann, J. (2000): Another road to God : the religious development of Arnoldus Buchelius (1565–1641). Dissertation University of Amsterdam, 1998.
- Langereis, S. (2001): Geschiedenis als ambacht. Oudheidkunde in de Gouden Eeuw: Arnoldus Buchelius en Petrus Scriverius. Dissertatie UvA, Publisher Verloren, Hilversum (see: Google Books)
