= Adrien van der Burch =

Office-holder in the Habsburg Netherlands (1501–1557)

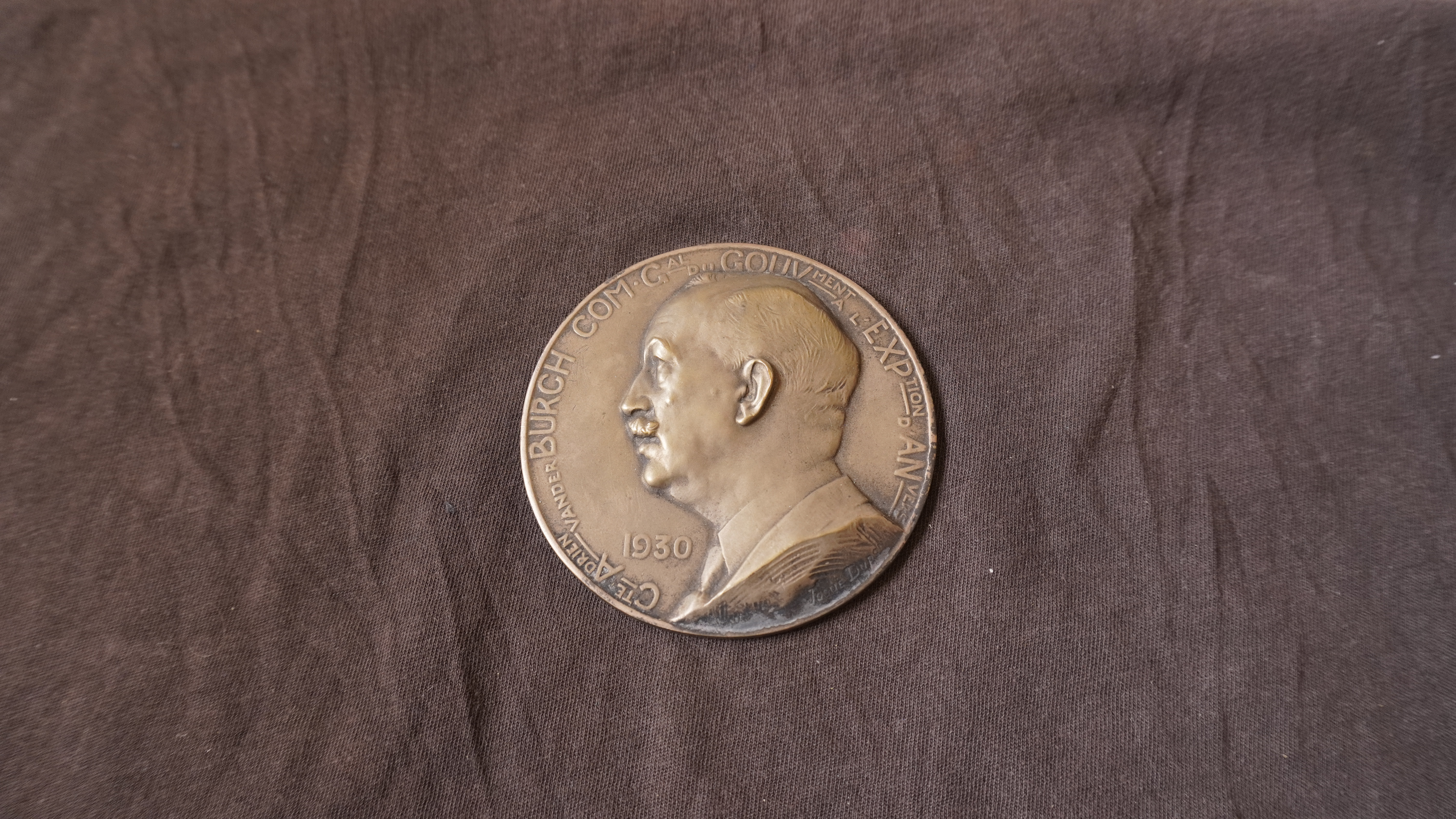

Adrien van der Burch (1501–1557) was an office-holder in the Habsburg Netherlands.

== Life ==
Van der Burch was born in 1501 to a noble family in Flanders. From 1533 to 1540 he served as pensionary to the rural Liberty of Bruges. He was then in turn a member of the Council of Flanders, and a member and master of requests to the Great Council of Mechelen.

Alongside his work as a judge and councillor, Van der Burch was employed on diplomatic business in Flanders, Spain and England, including the negotiation of the marriage between Queen Mary and Charles's son, Philip in 1554.

On 26 August 1556, Charles V appointed Van der Burch president of the Court of Utrecht. On 9 November 1556 he was appointed Councillor of State and Keeper of the Seals. He died in London on 2 July 1557.

He was the father of Jan van der Burch, who became president of the Brussels Privy Council, the historian Lambert van der Burch, and the poet Adrianus van der Burch.
