= Lambert van der Burch =

- Dean of St. Mary's Church, Utrecht
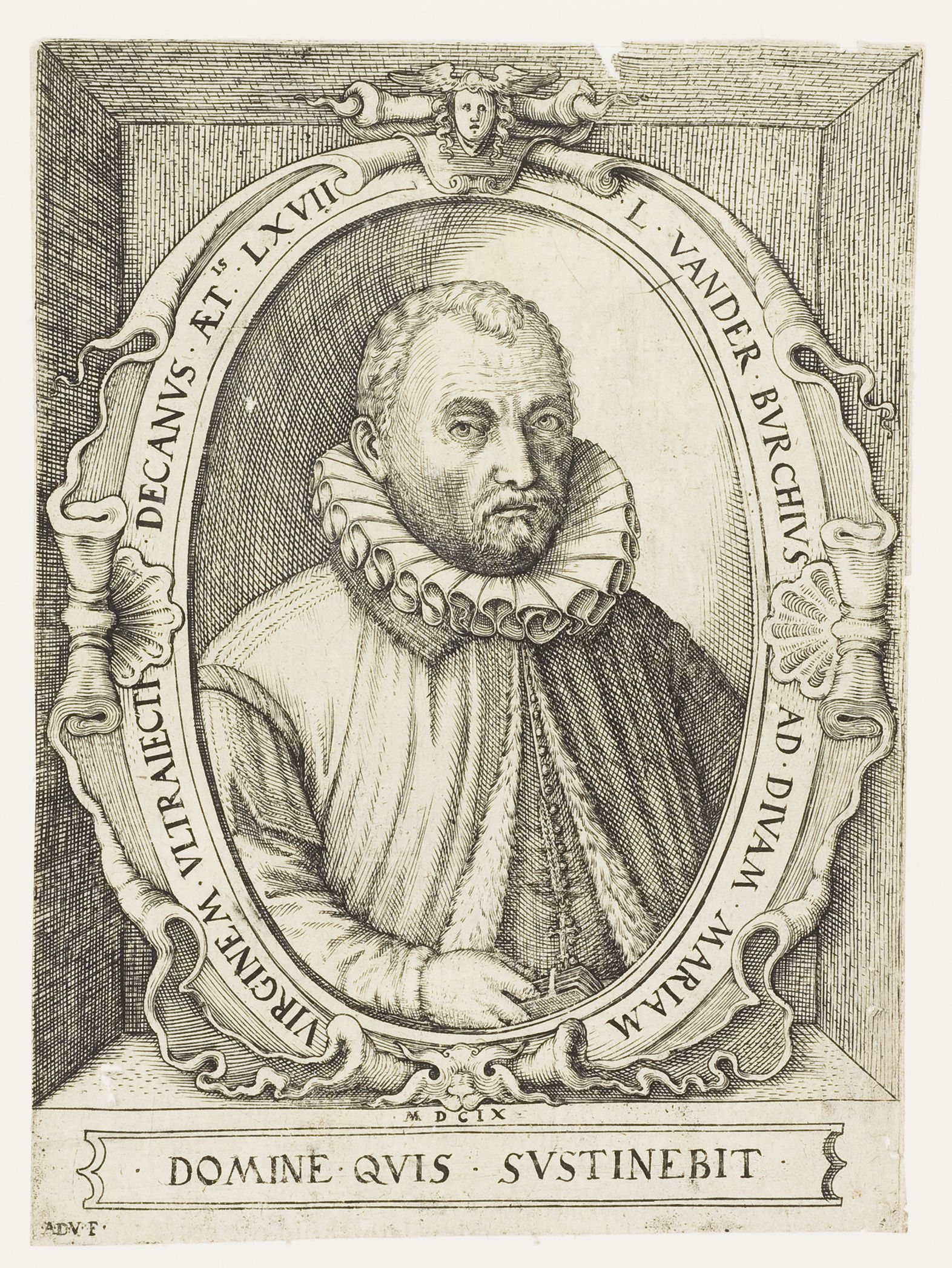
- Appointed: 9 December 1578

Personal details
- Born: 8 August 1542 Mechelen, Lordship of Mechelen, Habsburg Netherlands
- Died: 17 August 1617 (aged 75) Utrecht, Lordship of Utrecht, Dutch Republic
- Parents: Adrien van der Burch

Lambert van der Burch (1542–1617) was a clergyman and historian from the Habsburg Netherlands.

== Life ==
Lambert was born in Mechelen on 8 August 1542, the son of Adrien van der Burch. He became a canon of St. Mary's Church, Utrecht in 1555, and on 9 December 1578 was appointed dean of the chapter.

He sat in the States of Utrecht until 1582, when he was excluded as a Catholic. After a long exile in the Duchy of Cleves he returned to Utrecht, where he was appointed scholaster in 1605. He died in Utrecht on 17 August 1617.

== Writings ==
- Sabaudorum ducum principumque historiae gentilitae (1599)
- Guidonis Comitis Flandriae Vita (1615)
- Preces rythmicae latines ad divam virginem; origo admiranda et fundatio ecclesiae collegiatae D. Virginis Ultrajecti
- Historia comitum Flandriae (manuscript)
