= Adrianus van der Burch =

Latin poet in the Dutch Republic (died 1606)

Adrianus van der Burch or Vanderburchius (died 1606) was a Latin poet in the Dutch Republic.

== Life ==
He was born in Bruges, the son of Adrien van der Burch, and became clerk to the Court of Utrecht, of which his father had served as president. During the early decades of the Dutch Revolt he spent some time in exile in the Duchy of Cleves and then in Leiden, ultimately returning to Utrecht. He died in Utrecht on 24 December 1606.

== Works ==
- Laudes Hieronyma columnae, ascanii columnae (Antwerp, Plantin Press, 1582)
- Epigrammatum sacrorum centuriae II (Leiden, Franciscus Raphalengius, 1589)
- Epigrammatum centuriae III (1590)
- Hymnus paschalis, morte et resurrectione Christi (1590)
- Farrago piarum similitudinum (Leiden, Franciscus Raphalengius, 1593)
- Charites sive Silvas piorum amorum (1595)
- Fides ac spes (1597)
- Pia decasticha, seu sententiarum et exemplorum centuriae III (1599)
- Pii Lusus: In quibus Oscula & Oculi, ac post illos Tristia & Funera (Utrecht, Herman Borculos, 1600)
- Solatia, sive loci aliquot piarum consolationum (Utrecht, 1602)
- Piorum hexasticon centuriae IV (1603)
