= St. Paul's Abbey =

St. Paul's Abbey may refer to:

- St. Paul's Abbey in the Lavanttal, Austria
- St. Paul's Abbey, Oosterhout, Netherlands
- St. Paul's Abbey, Utrecht, Netherlands
- St. Paul's Abbey (New Jersey), United States, near Newton, in Andover Township
