= Utrecht Archives =

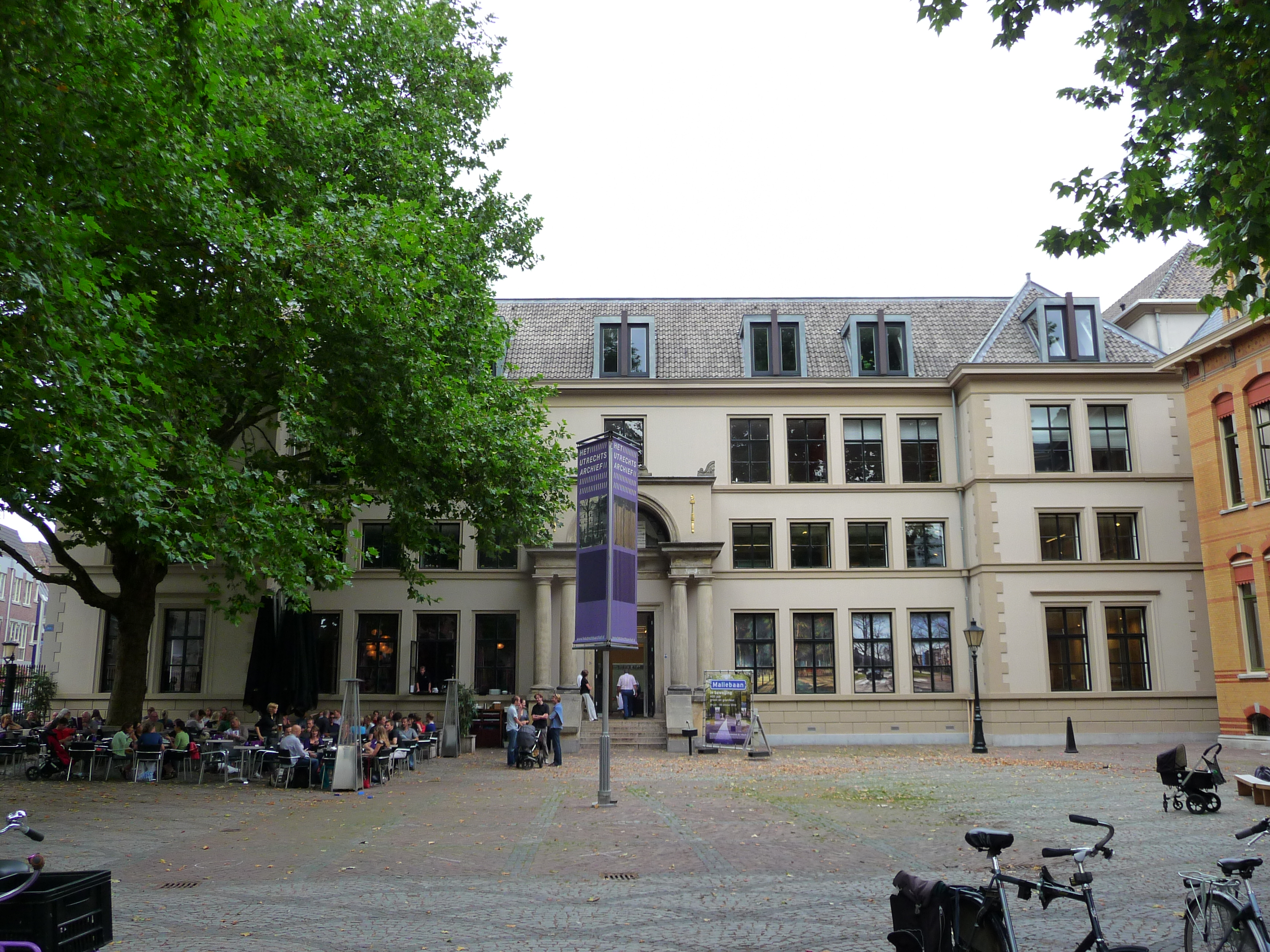
Utrecht Archive, Hamburgerstraat 28, Utrecht

The Utrecht Archives (Dutch: Het Utrechts Archief (HUA)) is a records department in the Dutch city of Utrecht. The Utrecht Archives manages the biggest and richest collection of documents about the history of the city and the province of Utrecht and its towns and people. With over 200 km of archives, images (such as prints, drawings, maps, photos, films) and 70.000 publications, the Archive is the major source of information for the history of Utrecht. The Utrecht Archives also disposes knowledge about legal supervision of archives in the field of analog as well as digital archive management. Besides, the national centre for ecclesiastical records is located in the Utrecht Archives together with the records of the Dutch Railways. The Utrecht Archives institution works closely together with other partners such as (local) governments, private individuals, partner institutions and other museums in Utrecht.

== Origin ==
The origin of the Utrecht Archives can be found in a chest with charters, which was stored in one of the city gates during the Middle Ages. This gate was the ‘Catharijnepoort’. Due to the fact that this gate was also used as a place to store gunpowder, the city archive had to be moved to another location. From 1546 it was placed in a house called ‘Lichtenberg’ located at the ‘Stadhuisbrug’. In April 1803, magistrate Pertus van Musschenbroek, from Utrecht, was appointed ‘archivarius honorair’ (honorary keeper of records) for the department of Utrecht. On October 17, 1803, he was permanently appointed as archivist of the City of Utrecht. From 1826 on, a Royal Decree mandated that provinces and local authorities draw up an inventory of their archives. For the ecclesiastical records they named Christiaan Paulus de Vos as keeper of records. These records would become the foundation for the future Public Record Office in Utrecht. De Vos’ successor, Gerrit Dedel, who already went by the name of ‘Master of the Rolls’. The current Utrecht Archives originated in 1998 from a merger between the Public Record Office and the Communal Archive and Photo Service of Utrecht. Since then, the Utrecht Archives are managed by a ‘mutual arrangement’ of the Dutch Ministry of Education, Culture and Science and the municipality of Utrecht. There are over 70 employees and a large group of volunteers working at the Archive. Until 1 October 2012, the director of the Utrecht Archives was Saskia van Dockum.

== Visitor centre and reading rooms ==
The Utrecht Archives can be found in two locations: The first is Hamburgerstraat 28 in Utrecht, which houses the visitor centre as well as a reading room for genealogical research and local history plus exhibitions. The second location is the Alexander Numankade 199–201 in Utrecht, where one can find the depots with archival records and collections established, together with the library and the reading room where visitors can study the original records.

== Archives ==
The Image Bank of the Archive allows readers to search, consult and download almost 130,000 digitized images from the image collection of the Utrecht Archives. The collection consists of more than 100,000 pictures, around 18,000 postcards, approximately 110 films, more than 6,000 drawings and almost 5,000 prints of the city of Utrecht and the Province of Utrecht, including those of the Dutch Railways Archive. This collection gets constantly supplemented. The Archive Database contains more than 1,249,300 scans of archive records. Digital versions of the local newspaper Utrechts Nieuwsblad, from 1893 until 1967, are available in the newspaper database.

== Building history ==
In 1050, St. Paul's Abbey, one of the oldest and most important monasteries in Utrecht, was built on this location. The construction of the Abbey can be attributed to Bishop Bernold. Today, only a few fragments of wall remain from the abbey and its church, still visible in the Utrecht Archives. In the hallway at the ground floor are the remains of the old ambulatory; in the auditorium there are fragments of the monastic chapter house, refectory and dormitory. The remains of the library can be seen in the reading room, and in the basement there are still some remnants of the cellars.

After the fire of 1253, the monastery needed to be extensively rebuilt. In the 16th century, after the Iconoclastic Fury and the Reformation, the monastery buildings became the site of the Court of Utrecht, and the building remained in use as a law court until the year 2000. A lot of reconstruction was done in the 19th century. The architect Christiaan Kramm provided the building with a new neoclassicist façade. As a result of this, the entrance was moved to the centre of the façade and the ground floor had to be raised. However, in 1900 the building had already turned out to be too small for its purpose. At the former location of a house at the Hamburgerstraat the Cantonal Court was built, after a design of the architect Willem Metzelaar. In the 1950s and 1960s the Court of Law has seen some dramatic changes.

The current floors, staircases and doorposts can be traced back to this period as well. The part which is now the Court Hotel was remodeled at the same time, including the part where the old façade still stands. In 2000, the law court was moved to a new building at the Catharijnesingel. The Utrecht Archives have been located in this building since June 2008.
