= St. Mary's Church, Utrecht =

St. Mary's Church
- Maria Maior
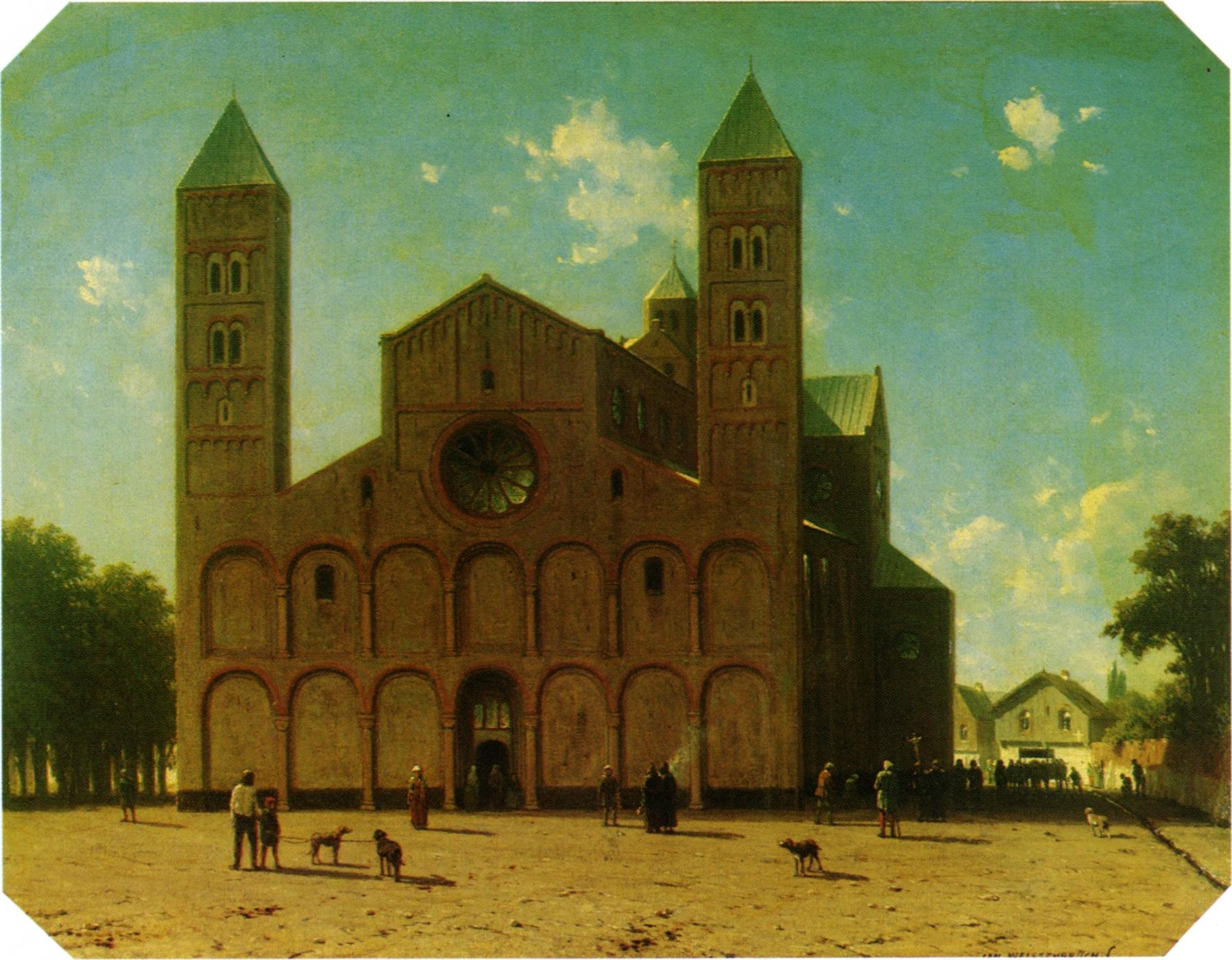
- St. Mary's Church
- 52°5′21″N 5°7′0″E
- Country: Netherlands
- Denomination: Catholic, Anglican

History
- Status: Demolished
- Founded: 1085
- Consecrated: 1099

Architecture
- Style: First Romanesque
- Closed: 1811
- Demolished: 1844

St. Mary's Church, also called Mariakerk or Maria Maior, was one of five collegiate churches in the Dutch city of Utrecht, the others being St. Martin's Cathedral, St. Salvator's Church, the Pieterskerk, and the Janskerk. It dated from the eleventh century and was considered one of the finest buildings in Romanesque style in the Netherlands.

The church was demolished in stages during the first half of the nineteenth century. Today only the cloister at the Mariaplaats remains, behind the Gebouw voor Kunsten en Wetenschappen which houses the Utrecht Conservatory.

== History ==
St. Mary's Church was said to be founded jointly by Henry IV and Conrad, Bishop of Utrecht as the western culmination of the kerkenkruis of Utrecht. Conrad was a loyal supporter of Henry IV during the Investiture Crisis. He accompanied him during his expedition in Italy in 1083 and was present at his coronation as emperor in 1084.

The church was located further west in the kerkenkruis because the location in the immediate west of the Traiectum was already occupied by business district Stathe, and the Buurkerk.

From 1085 onward Conrad spend more time in Utrecht, and it is postulated that the construction of St. Mary's Church started around this time. The church was built to resemble the Speyer Cathedral in mind as an example, which served as the most eminent church of Henry IV, and which was the burial church of the Salian dynasty. As such St. Mary's Church became a symbol of the emperor.

In 1099 the construction of the St. Mary's Church had advanced to a point that the choir could be inaugurated. In the same year however, Conrad was murdered, and the construction came to a standstill. Only after an episode in 1133, when Floris the Black entrenched himself in St. Mary's Church during his raids of the diocese, construction was resumed, albeit under a different plan: the nave and the west side were performed in Lombard style, which gave St. Mary's Church a remarkable Italian appearance, unlike anything found north of the Alps. Around 1160 two towers were added next to the westwork.

At this point, St. Mary's Church had a very grand, monumental stature. Unlike the other Romanesque churches in Utrecht, it had two further transepts, was entirely vaulted in stone and additionally had stands above the aisles. St Mary's Basilica was linked to a chapter of thirty canons.

In 1421 the relatively modest Romanesque choir was replaced by a much larger Gothic choir. The windows in the west wall were also modernized. A picture of Emperor Henry was placed. In 1528 the painter Jan van Scorel became canon of St. Mary's Church; among other things he designed a rood screen and some stained glass windows. After his death he was buried in St. Mary's Church, his tomb becoming the first elaborately decorated grave ever to be given to an artist in the Netherlands.

The church' decline began during the siege of Vredenburg in 1576, when the north tower was destroyed by cannon fire. After the Reformation, the church was taken in use by the Anglican Communion and the choir was re-purposed to serve as an exhibition space. In 1682 the remaining tower was demolished followed by the demolition of the entire west side in 1715.

The lifting of the chapter in 1811 eventually led to the destruction of the church. Emperor Napoleon ordered the demolition of the church in 1813 for the proceeds from the sale of materials. The demolition was complete by 1816 leaving only the Gothic choir, which had served as a concert hall since 1764. This too was finally demolished in 1844, making way for the new Gebouw voor Kunsten en Wetenschappen.

== Cloister ==
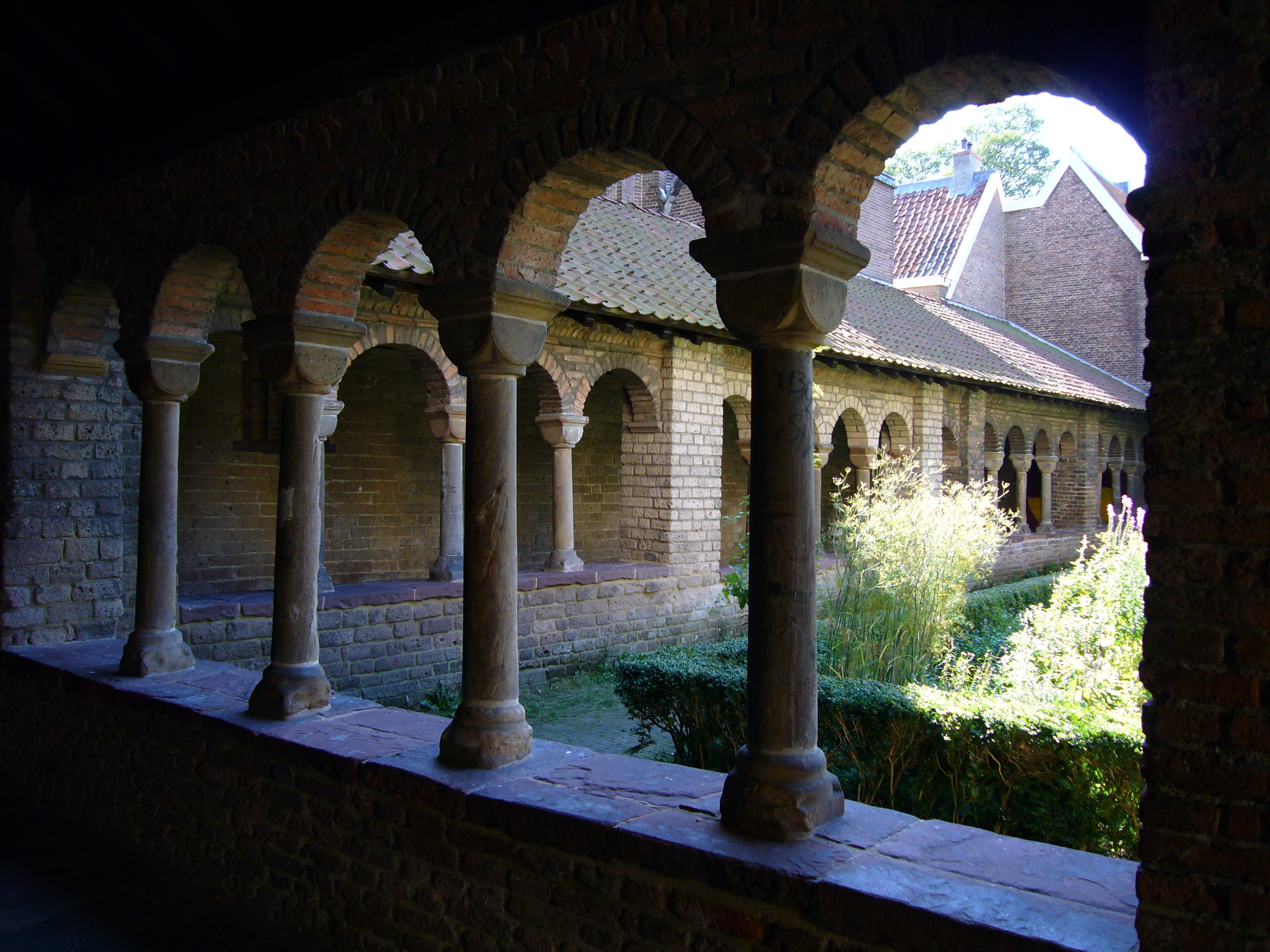
the cloister

The cloister of St. Mary's Church was spared because at the time of the demolition of the church it resided on the territory of the Old Catholic Church. Of the three arms is the western arm is the oldest, originating in the eleventh century. The other arms arose around 1140. During later repairs of the cloister, the original tuff walls were replaced by brick. The columns and capitals are sandstone. The westarm was rebuilt in 1633. Restorations took place during the early twentieth century.
