= Bernold =

Roman Catholic Bishop of Utrecht and saint

Bernold of Utrecht
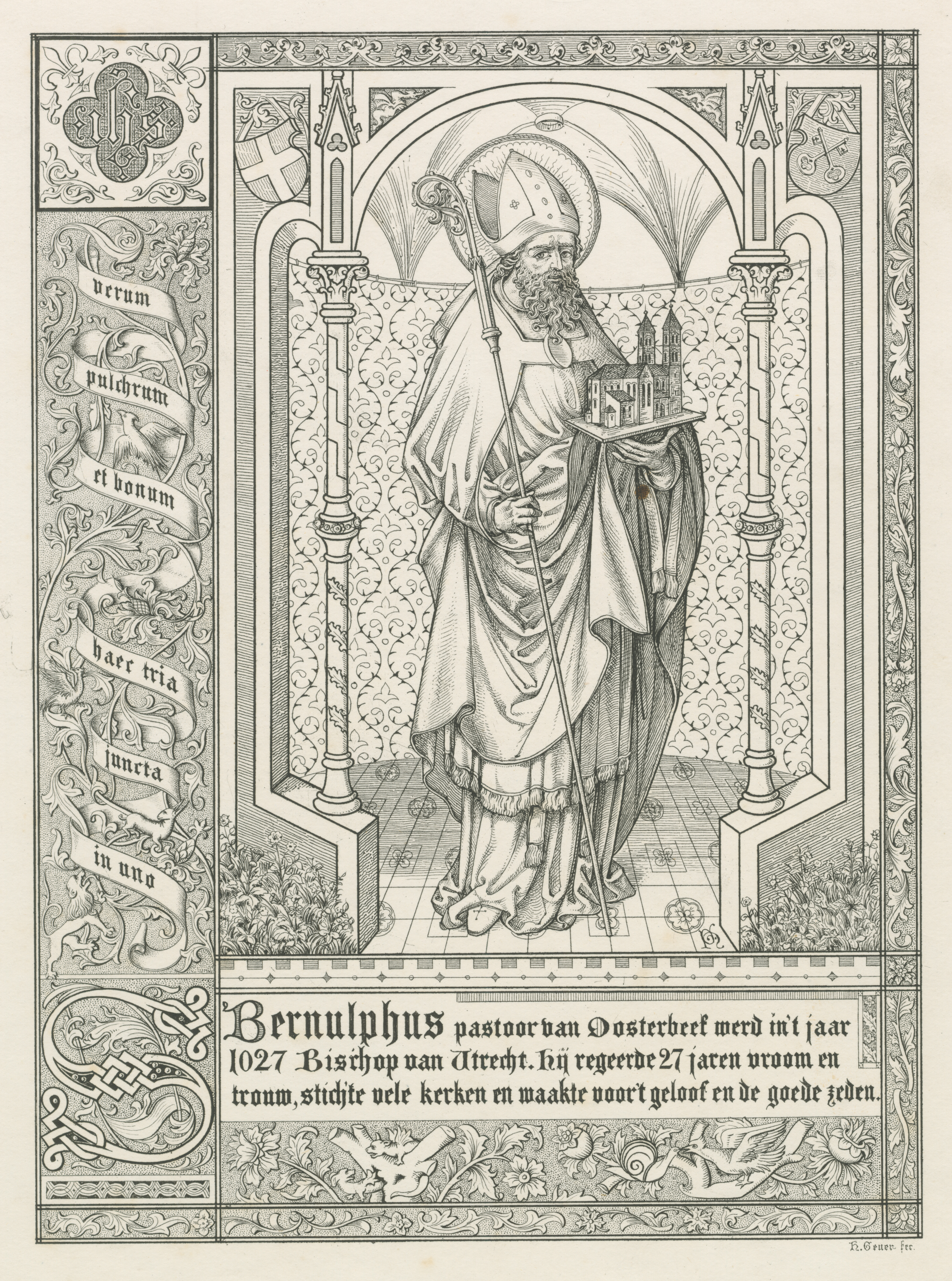

Bishop
- Died: 19 July 1054; Utrecht
- Venerated in: Eastern Orthodox Church, Roman Catholic Church
- Feast: 19 July, and additionally 24 July in the Orthodox Church
- Patronage: Dutch Artists

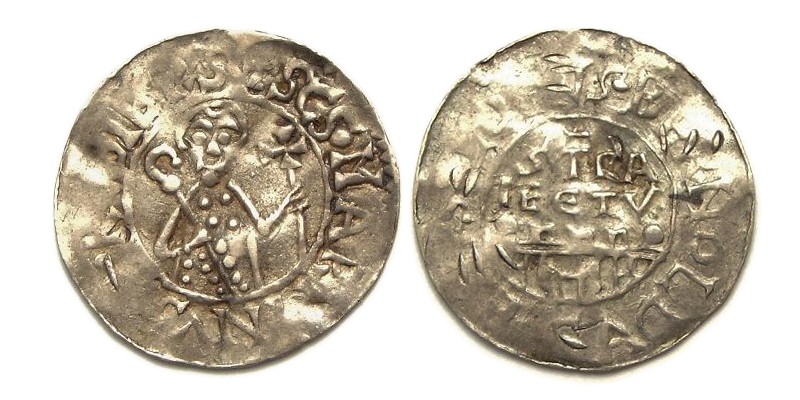
Denier, struck under Bernold, Bishop of Utrecht.

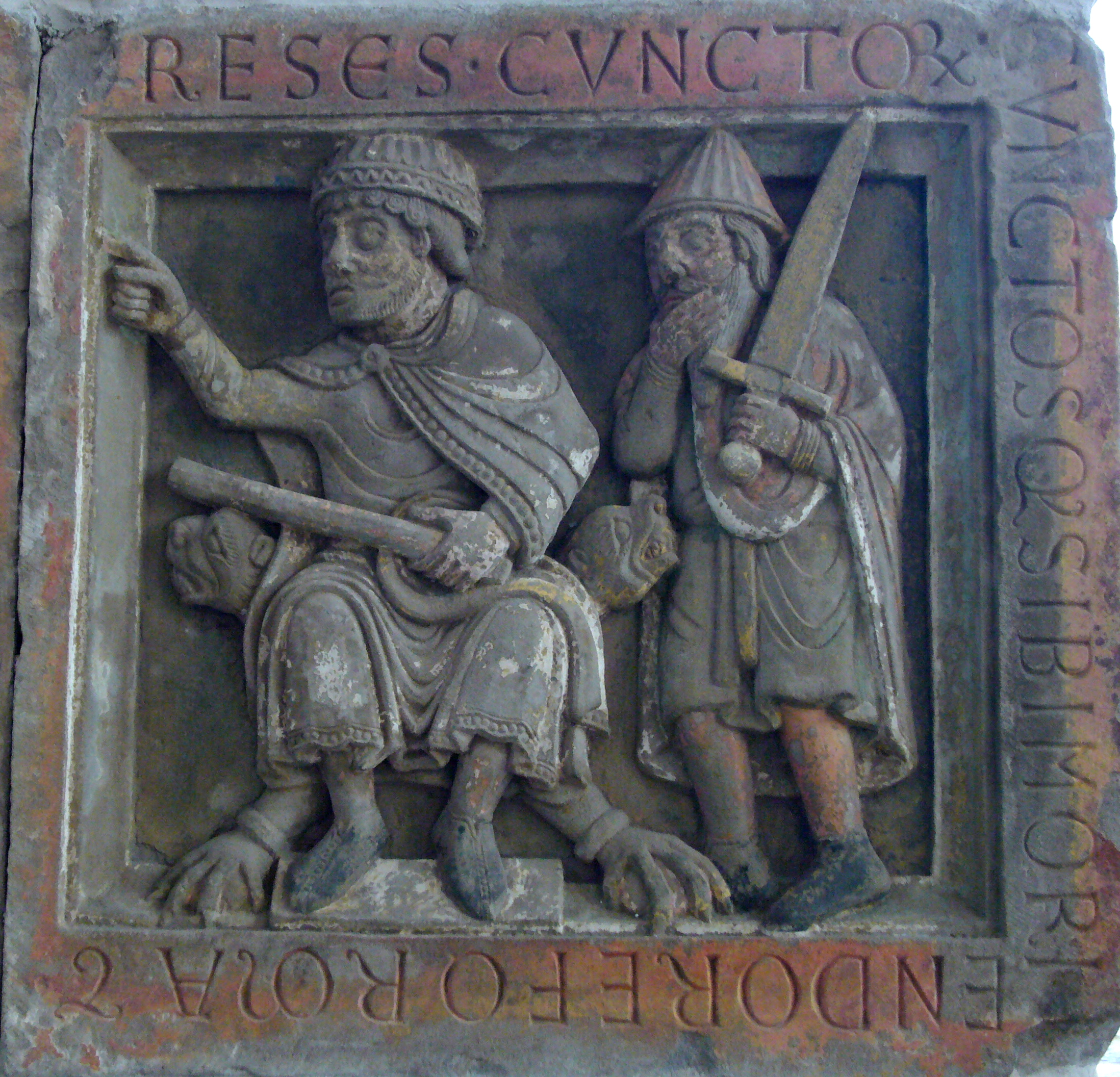
A relief from Saint Peters (St Pieterskerk), Utrecht, founded by Bernold in 1039.

Saint Bernulf or Bernold of Utrecht (died 19 July 1054) was Bishop of Utrecht (1026/27–1054).

Bernold succeeded Saint Adalbold as Bishop of Utrecht on 24 September 1027, when he was appointed by emperor of the Holy Roman Empire Conrad II. He was likely an official in Conrad's court prior to taking on the powerful post as Prince-Bishop: both an episcopal head and secular feudal lord within the Empire. A supporter of Conrad and his successor Henry III, Bernold was active church reform, helping to reduce episcopal power over monastic orders, helping to strengthen the Cluniac order in his domains, weakening lay lords control of churches and church land, and aiding the Holy Roman Emperor. For this, Conrad and Henry expanded his see, further angering local nobility. Bernold was friend of the future Emperor Henry III (succeeded Conrad in 1046), and traveled on Henry's 1041 campaign against the Hungarians. During Henry's visits to Utrecht in 1040 and 1042, he expanded the see. A brief rebellion led by Lorraine nobility in 1046 was defeated by Emperor Henry, and the Council of Aachen in 1049 saw Bernold's see expanded.

Bishop Bernold established the Collegiate churches of Saint John (Janskerk) in 1040, Saint Peter (St Pieterskerk) in 1039, and St. Paul's Abbey and its church (St Pauluskerk). With the “Mariakerk” (begun 1090), they form the outside of the Utrecht “Kerkenkruis”: the Church Cross formed by four churches and a cathedral placed at its center.

Bernold died on 19 July 1054, which is his feast day. He has an additional feast day of 24 July in the Orthodox Church. His relics, including a cloth shirt, are venerated in Utrecht, and his cult goes back to at least the 14th century. In 1917, he was made patron of the Artist's guild of Holland.

== See also ==
- Guild of St. Bernulphus
- Bishops of Utrecht
- Henry III, Holy Roman Emperor
- Utrecht

Catholic Church titles
Preceded by Adalbold II	Bishop of Utrecht; 1026/7–1054	Succeeded by William I
