= Kerkenkruis =

Formation of churches that form a cross

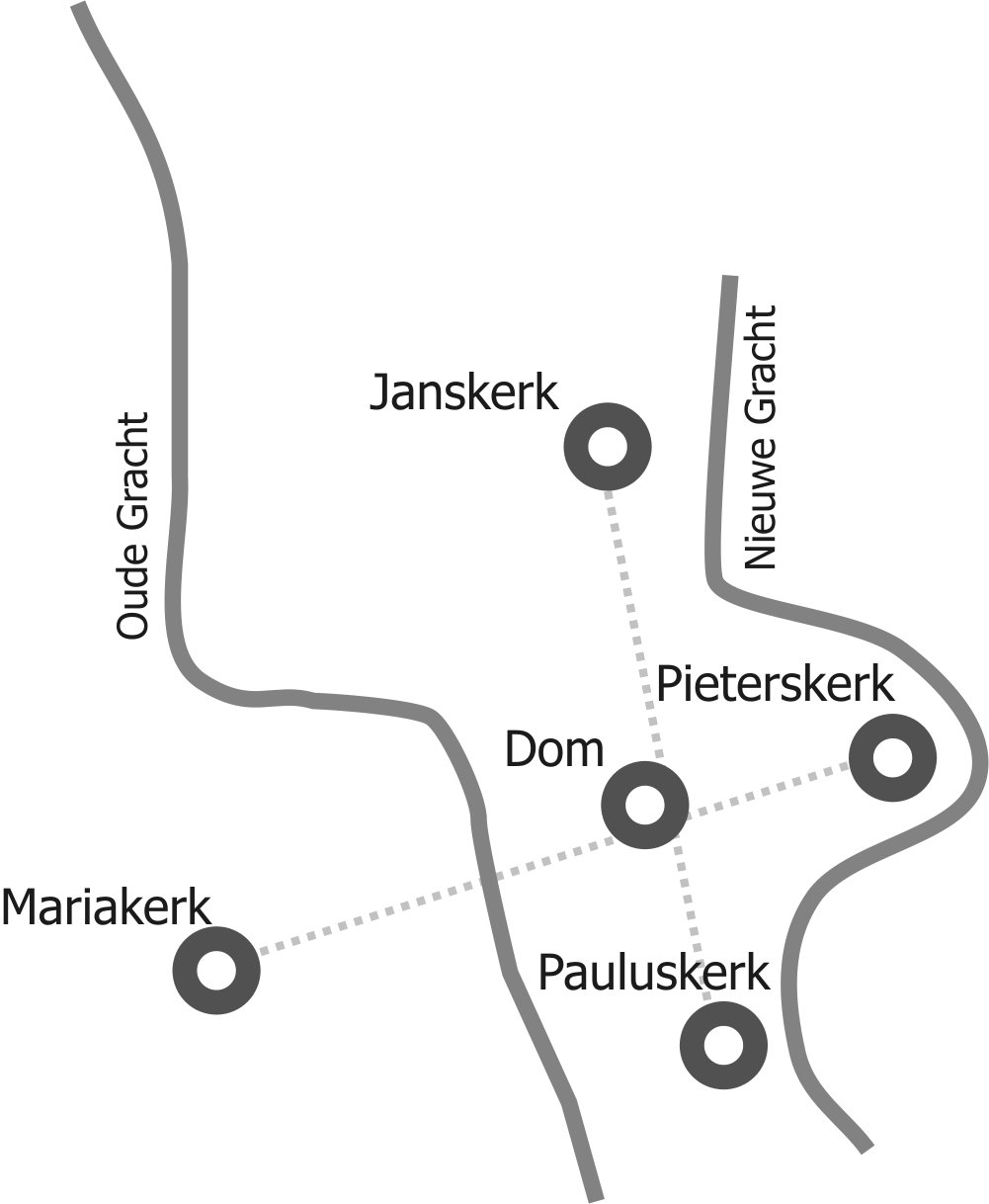
The kerkenkruis in Utrecht

A kerkenkruis (Dutch: literally "church-cross") is a formation of churches that form a cross on a map. The primary example is in Utrecht, the Netherlands, where five churches form a cross: the Utrecht Cathedral (known as the Dom) in the center, with St. John's Church, St. Peter's Church, St. Paul's Abbey, and St. Mary's Church as the north, east, south, and west extremities respectively.

All of the churches date from the Middle Ages, but the term kerkenkruis is younger. It is uncertain whether forming a cross was accidental or intentional.
