= Court of Utrecht =

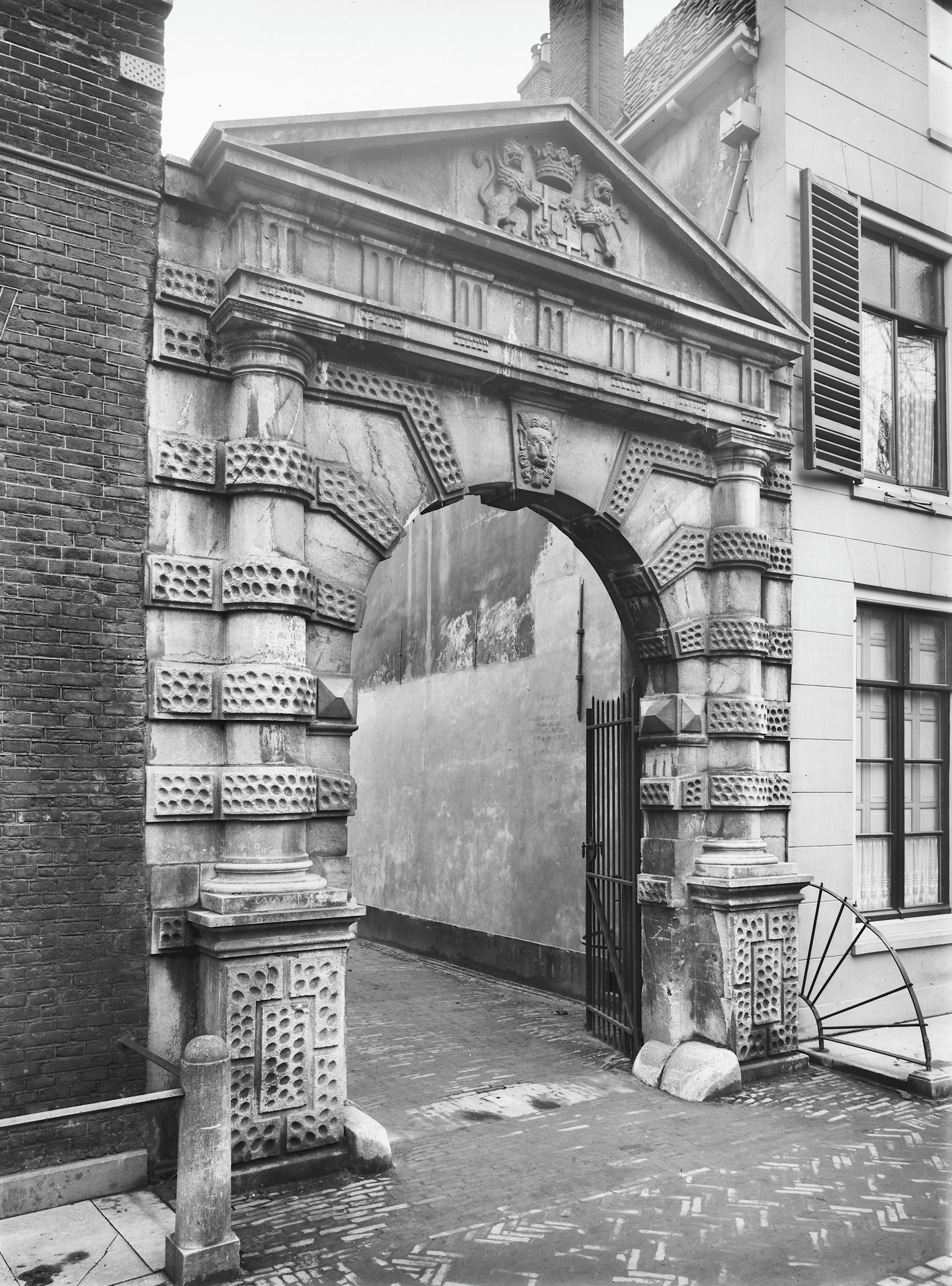
The entrance gate

The Court of Utrecht (Dutch: Hof van Utrecht) was the highest law court in the Lordship of Utrecht from 1530 until 1795 and in the departments of the Batavian Republic (1795-1806) and the Kingdom of Holland (1806-1811) that would become the Province of Utrecht. It had civil and criminal jurisdiction in the City of Utrecht and was an appellate court for the province.

Charles V, who had acquired lordship over Utrecht in 1528, established the court on 23 March 1530. Originally established in what had been an orphanage, in 1595 the court moved into the buildings of the former St. Paul's Abbey, Utrecht.

The court continued to function under the Dutch Republic, the Batavian Republic, the Kingdom of Holland, and for a year after the annexation of the province into the First French Empire. It was dissolved in 1811. Its records are held by the Utrecht Archives, which since 2008 have a located at the law court's former site.
