= St. Peter's Church, Utrecht =

Church building in Utrecht, Netherlands

Coordinates: 52°5′29″N 5°7′28″E

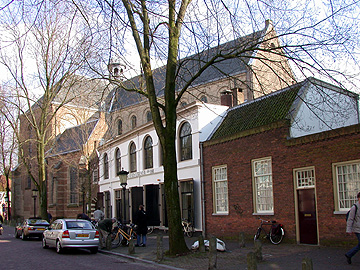
St. Peter's Church seen from the northwest

St. Peter's Church (Dutch: Pieterskerk) is a Reformed and former Roman Catholic church in the city of Utrecht in the Netherlands, dedicated to Peter the Apostle. It is one of the city's oldest churches. Its construction began in 1039 and it was inaugurated on 1 May 1048 by Bernold, Bishop of Utrecht (although the lost west towers were probably only finished about a century after the inauguration). The church was the eastern end of Utrecht's "Kerkenkruis", of which the Domkerk is the centre. Characteristic of the Romanesque style in which it is built are the church's large nave pillars, each hewn from one piece of red sandstone, and the crypt under the choir. The building is now used by the Walloon Church.

== Gallery ==
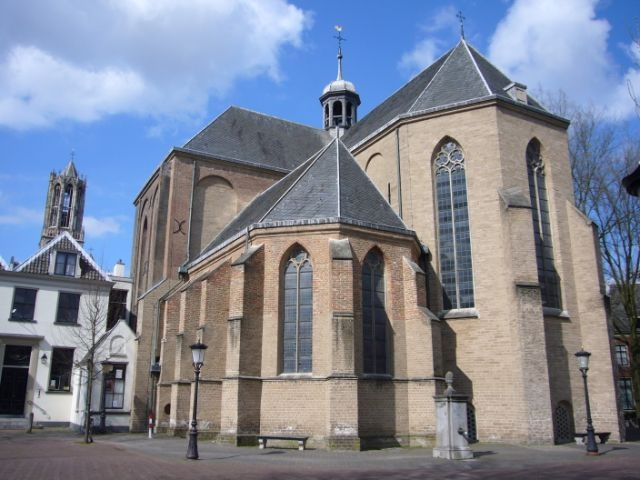
The choir of the Pieterskerk seen from the southeast

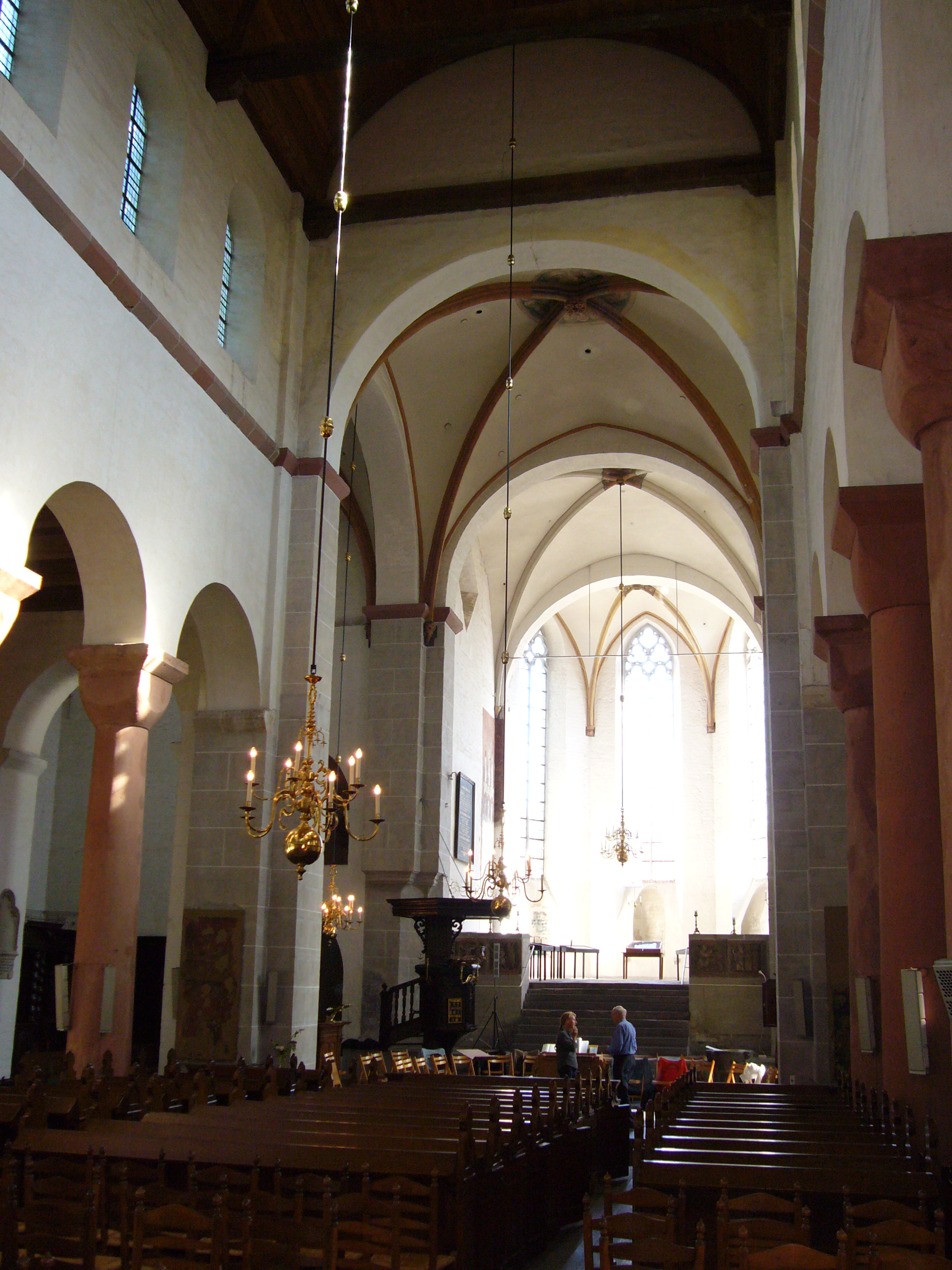
Interior of the Pieterskerk

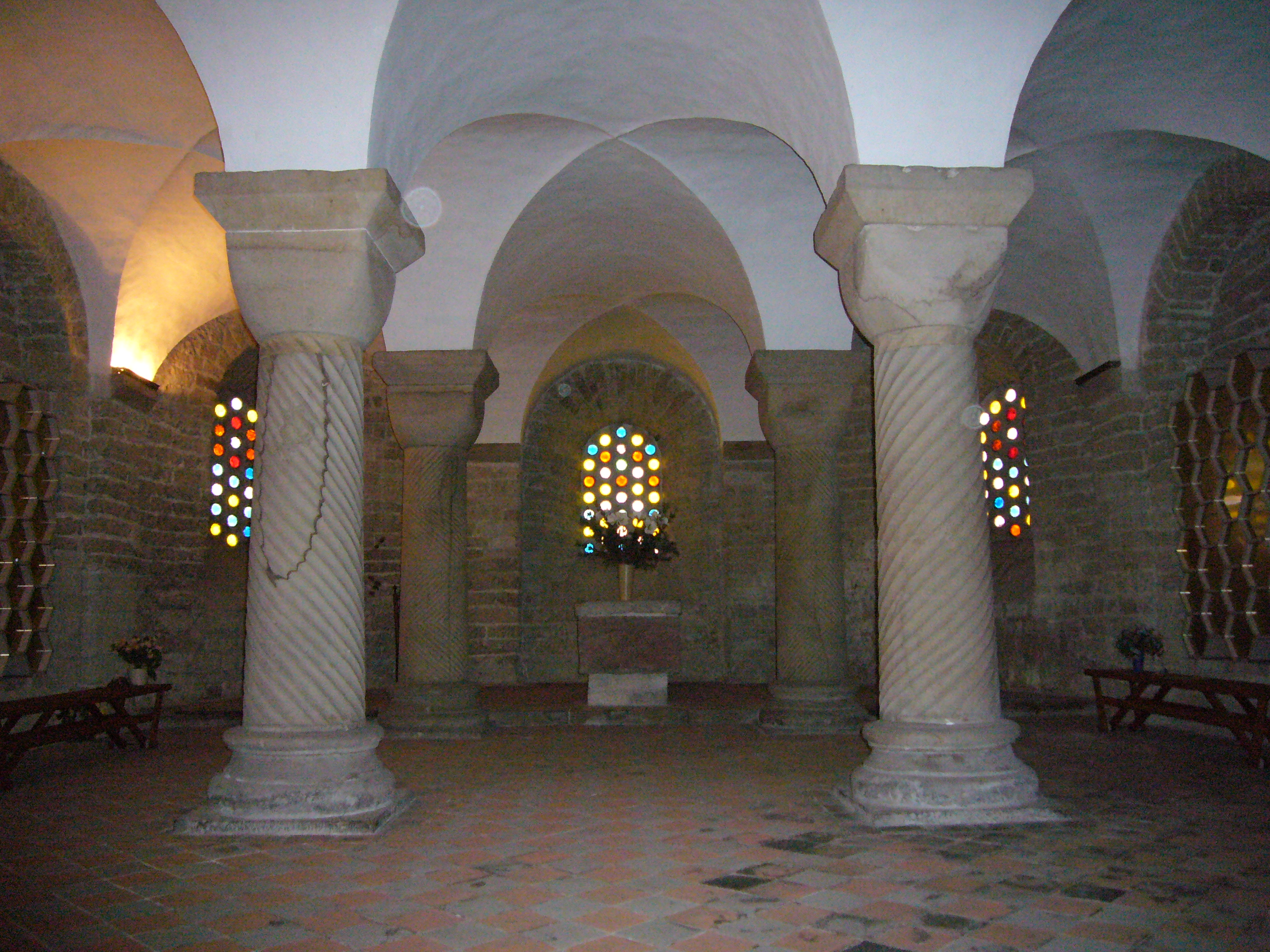
Crypt of the Pieterskerk

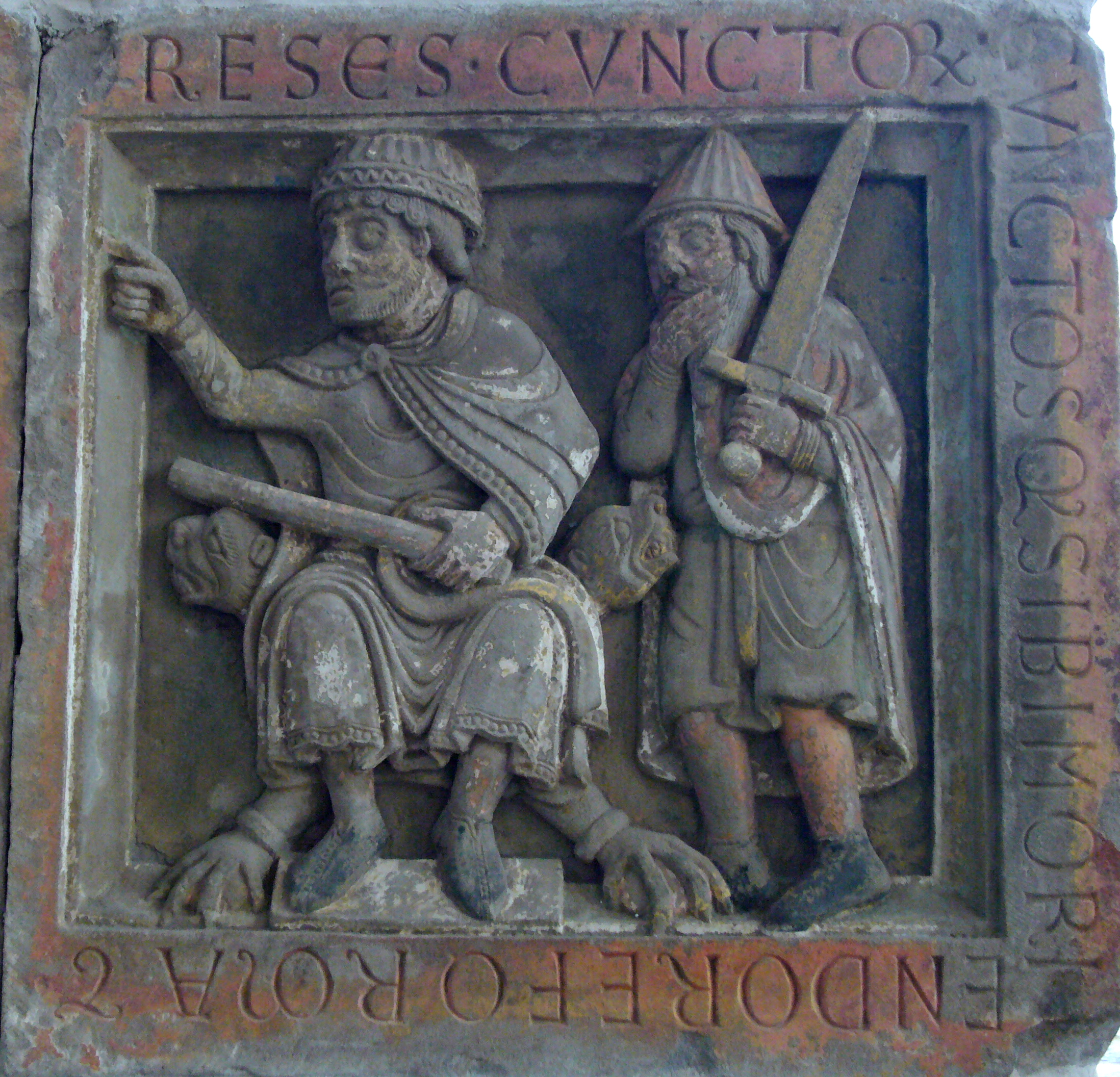
One of the Romanesque reliefs from the Pieterskerk
