= St. Martin's Cathedral, Utrecht =

Church dedicated to Saint Martin of Tours

Utrecht Cathedral
- St Martin's Cathedral
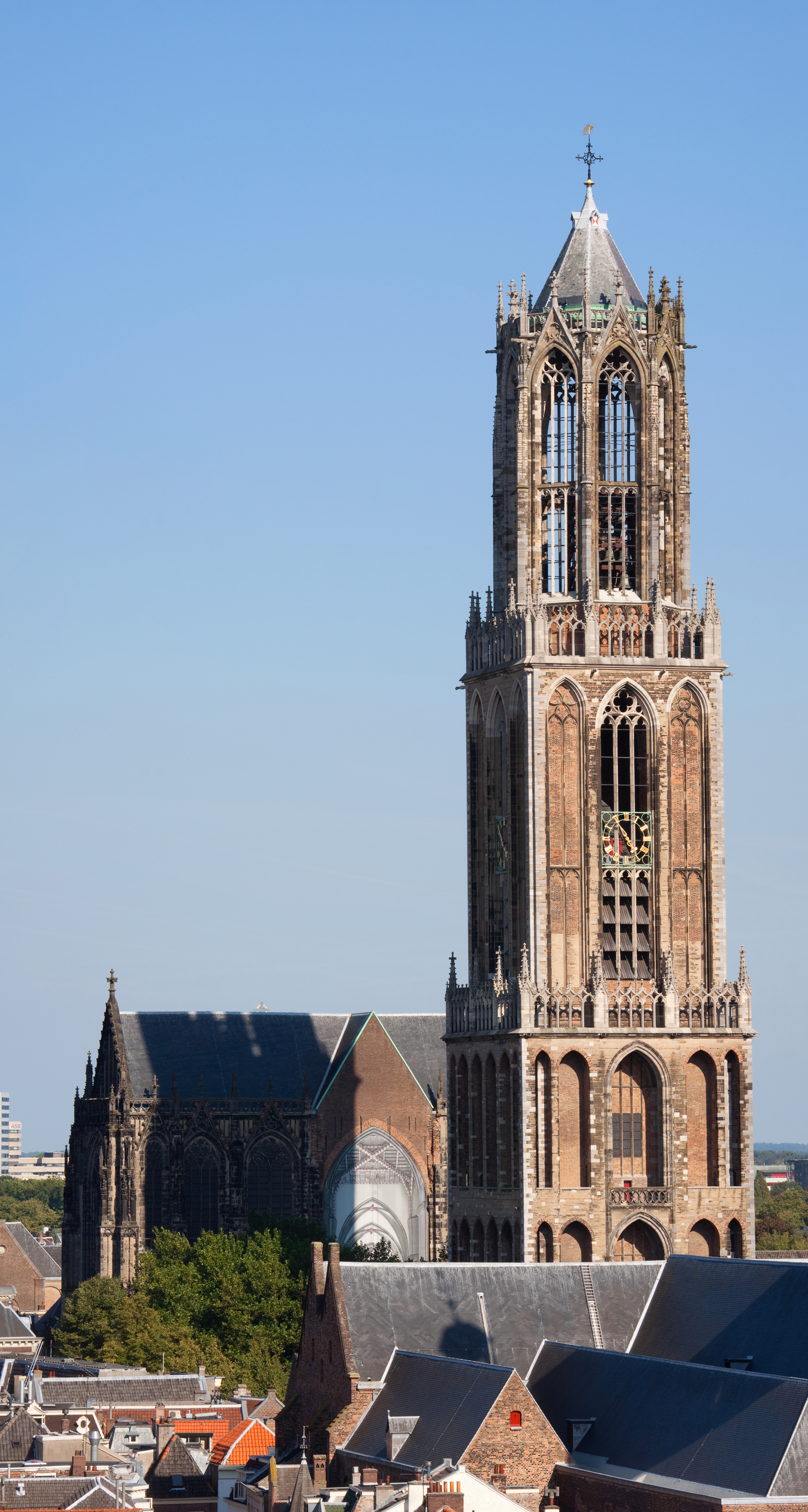
- Utrecht Cathedral
- 52°5′27″N 5°7′18″E
- Denomination: Protestant Church in the Netherlands
- Previous denomination: Roman Catholic

Architecture
- Style: Gothic

Frontiers of the Roman Empire -- The Lower German Limes: Utrecht-Domplein
UNESCO World Heritage Site
- Interactive map of Frontiers of the Roman Empire -- The Lower German Limes: Utrecht-Domplein
- Location: Utrecht, Netherlands
- Criteria: Cultural: (ii), (iii), (iv)
- Reference: 1631
- Inscription: 2021 (44th Session)

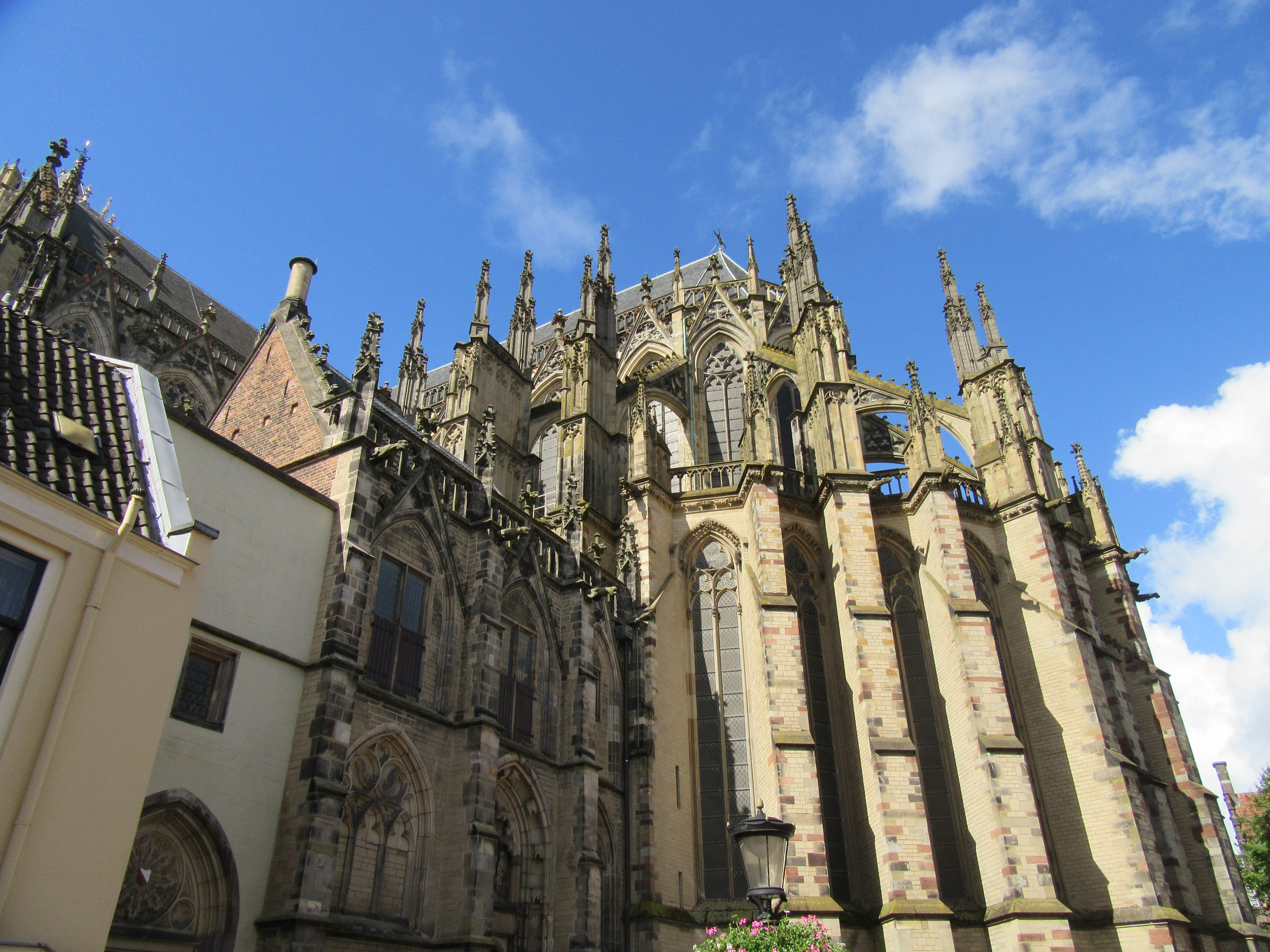
St Martin's Cathedral, Utrecht, buttresses as seen from SE

St. Martin's Cathedral, Utrecht, or Dom Church (Dutch: Domkerk), is a Gothic church dedicated to Saint Martin of Tours, which was the cathedral of the Diocese of Utrecht during the Middle Ages. It is the country's only pre-Reformation cathedral, but has been a Protestant church since 1580.

It was once the Netherlands' largest church, but the nave collapsed in a storm in 1674 and has never been rebuilt, leaving the tower isolated from the east end.

The building is the one church in the Netherlands that closely resembles the style of classic Gothic architecture as developed in France. All other Gothic churches in the Netherlands belong to one of the many regional variants. Unlike most of its French predecessors, the building has only one tower, the 112-metre-high (367 ft) Dom Tower, which is the hallmark of the city.

In the joint 2021, 2022 session of the World Heritage Committee the cathedral, Dom Tower, and the Domplein were inscribed as a UNESCO World Heritage Site as part of the Lower Germanic Limes, for its Roman archaeological remains within the square.

== History ==
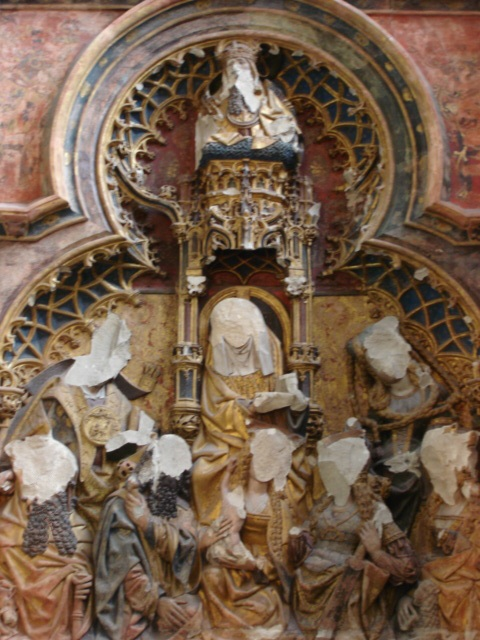
Altar piece in St. Martin's Cathedral, attacked in Reformation iconoclasm in the 16th century

The first chapel in Utrecht was founded around 630 AD by Frankish clergy under the patronage of the Merovingian kings, but it was destroyed during an attack of the Frisians on Utrecht shortly thereafter. The site of this first chapel within Utrecht is unknown. Saint Willibrord (died 739), the Apostle to the Frisians, established a second chapel devoted to Saint Martin on (or close to) the site of the current building. This church was destroyed by the Normans in the 9th century during one of their many raids on Utrecht, but was reconstructed by Bishop Balderic in the 10th century. During this period St. Martin's came to be the principal church of Utrecht, see of the bishop. The church had its own small territorial close (known as an "immunity") and was led by a cathedral chapter of canons, who generally belonged to the nobility.

The church was repeatedly destroyed by fires and then rebuilt. A Romanesque style church was built by Bishop Adalbold and consecrated in 1023. It is thought to have been the center of a cross-shaped conglomeration of five churches, called a Kerkenkruis, built to commemorate Conrad II. This building, also known as Adalbold's Dom, was partially destroyed in the fire of 1253 which ravaged much of Utrecht, leading Bishop Henry van Vianen to initiate the construction of the current Gothic structure in 1254. The construction of the Gothic cathedral continued into the 16th century. The first part to be built was the choir. The Dom Tower was started in 1321 and finished in 1382. After 1515, steadily diminishing financing prevented completion of this building project, of which an almost complete series of building accounts exists. In 1566, the Beeldenstorm or Iconoclast Fury swept across much of the Low Countries, justified by the Calvinist belief that statues in a house of God were idolatrous images which must be destroyed. As a result, many of the ornaments on both the exterior and interior of the cathedral were destroyed.

In 1580 the Utrecht city government devolved the cathedral from the Diocese of Utrecht to local Calvinists. From then on Protestant services were held in the building with one brief exception, in 1672 and 1673, during the Franco-Dutch War, when Catholic Masses were again held in the cathedral. A year after the French retreat, the still unfinished and insufficiently supported nave collapsed on 1 August 1674 during the 1674 derecho. Over the subsequent centuries, much of the enormous building fell into further neglect. The pitiable state of the cathedral led to some small restoration activities in the nineteenth century, followed by major renovations in the early twentieth century with the aim of returning the cathedral to its original state. However, the nave was never rebuilt.

The Catholic Church remained strong within Utrecht following the Reformation but was legally obliged to worship discreetly in clandestine churches (schuilkerken). One of these churches, St. Gertrude's, later became the principal cathedral of the Old Catholic Church of the Netherlands.

The Catholic Church, during the 1853 reestablishment of the episcopal hierarchy in the Netherlands, designated the former St. Catherine's Church of the Carmelites as the cathedral of the Roman Catholic Archdiocese of Utrecht.

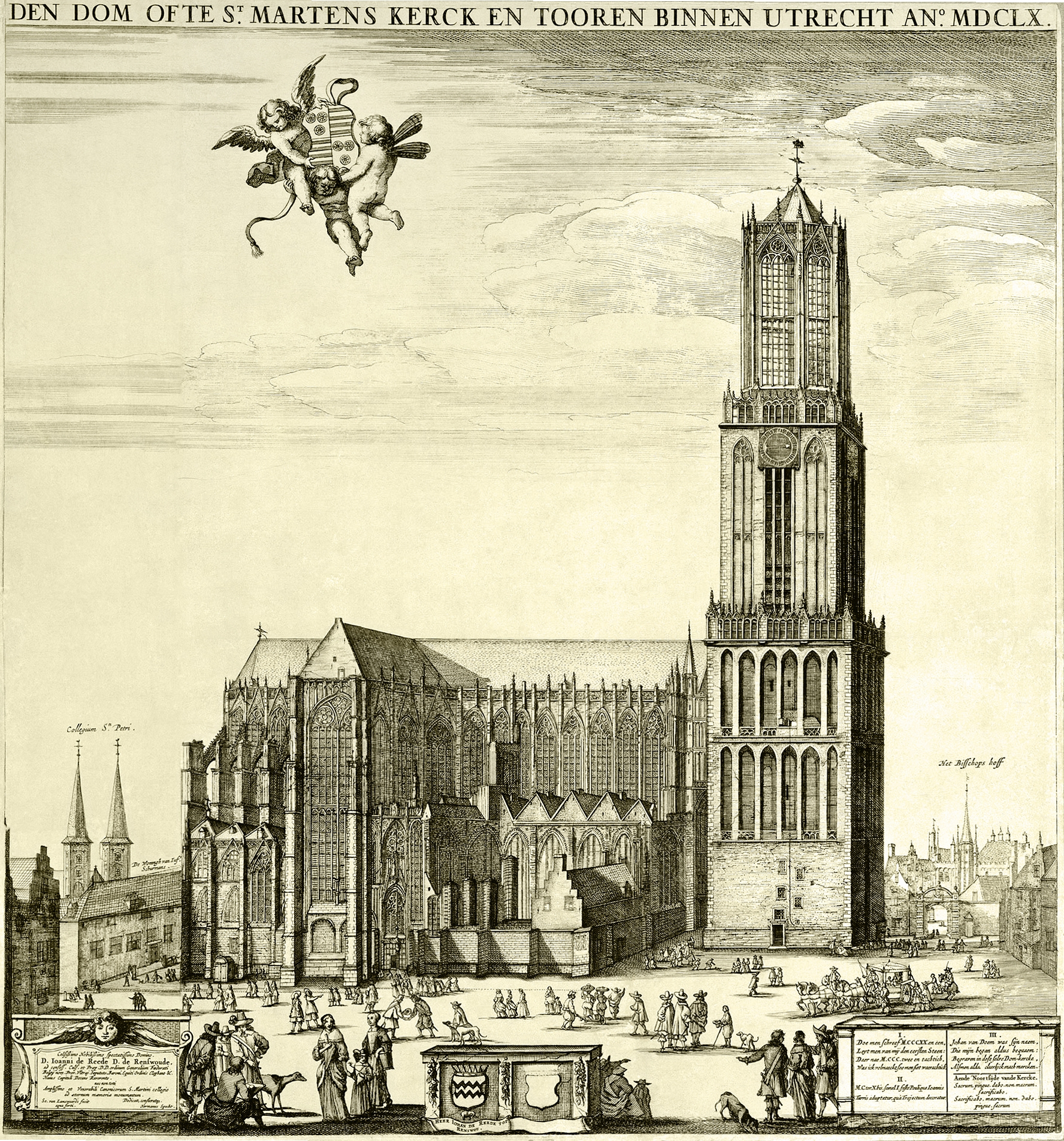
View of St. Martin's Cathedral from the north, before the nave's collapse. Etching after Steven van Lamsweerde, 1660

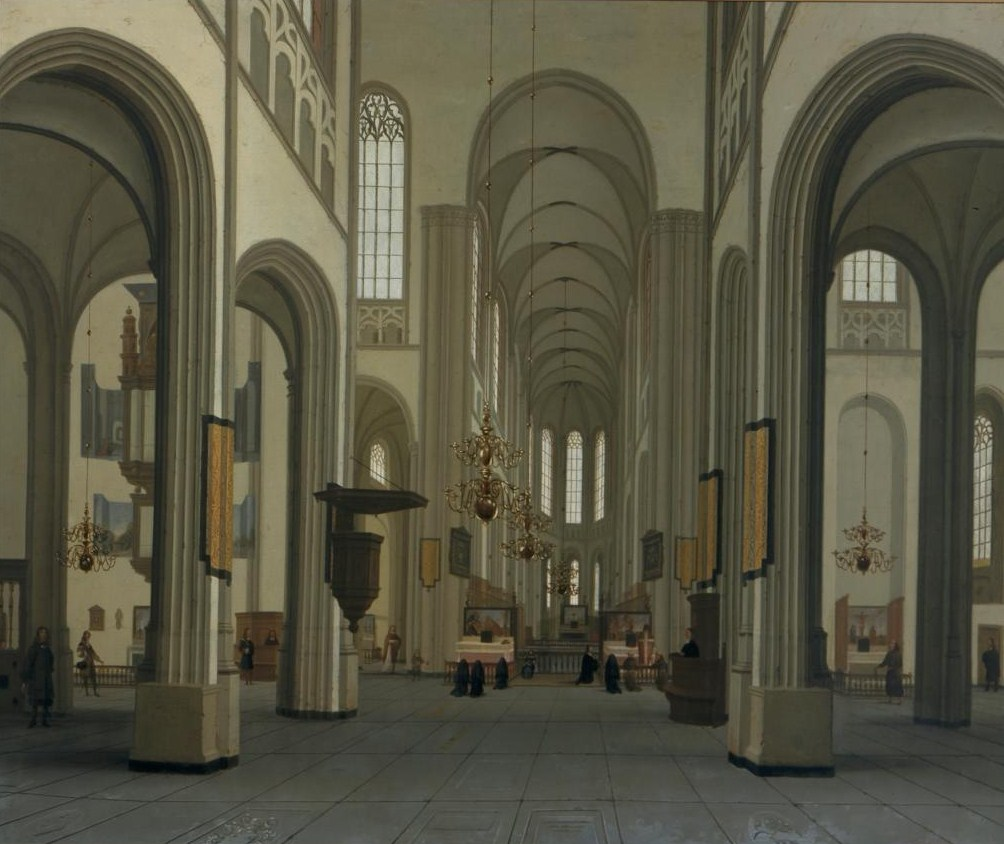
Interior view by Hendrick van Vliet, 1674 (the year of the storm)

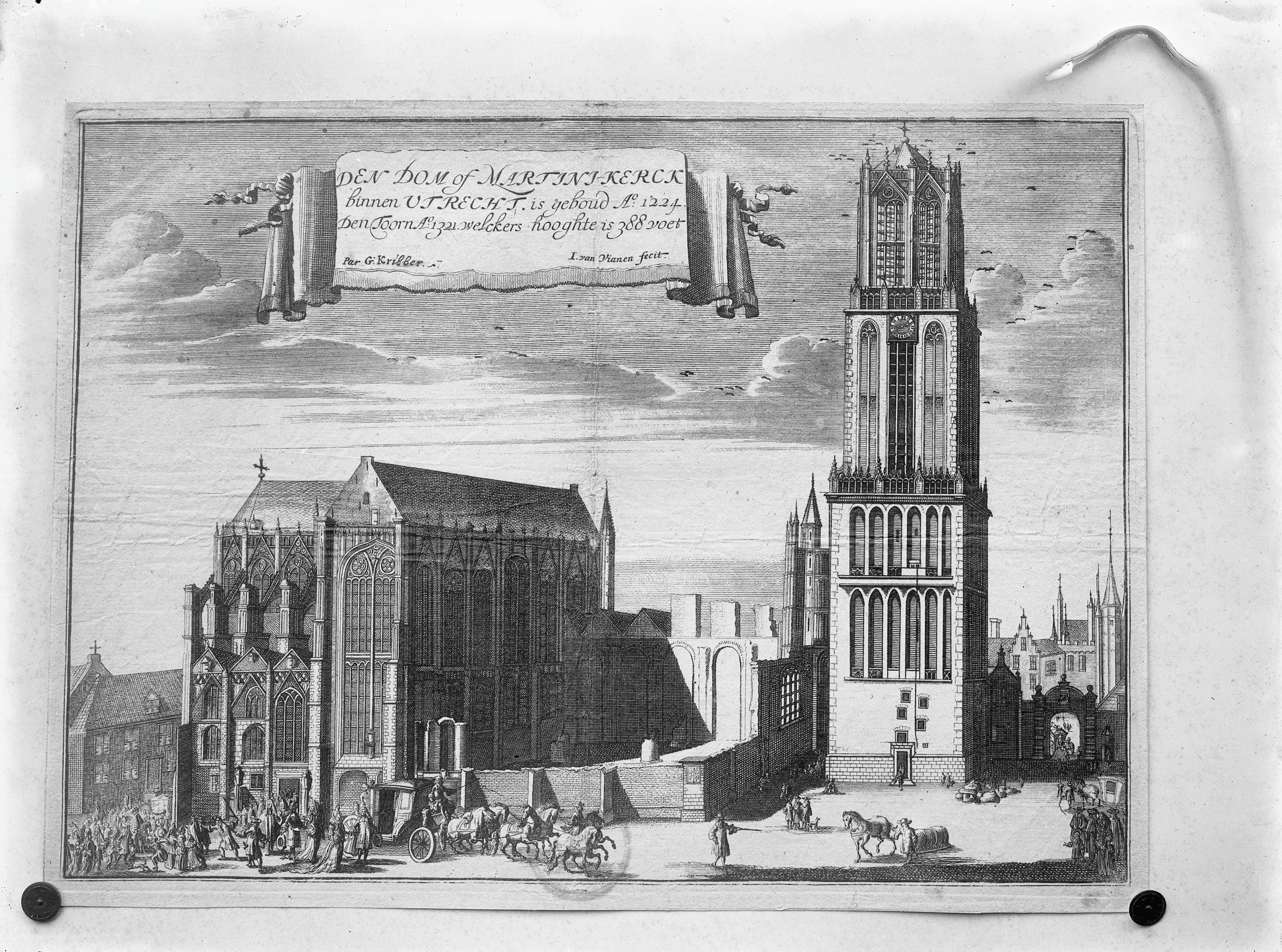
View of the choir from the north showing the collapsed nave. Engraving by I. van Vianen, 1697

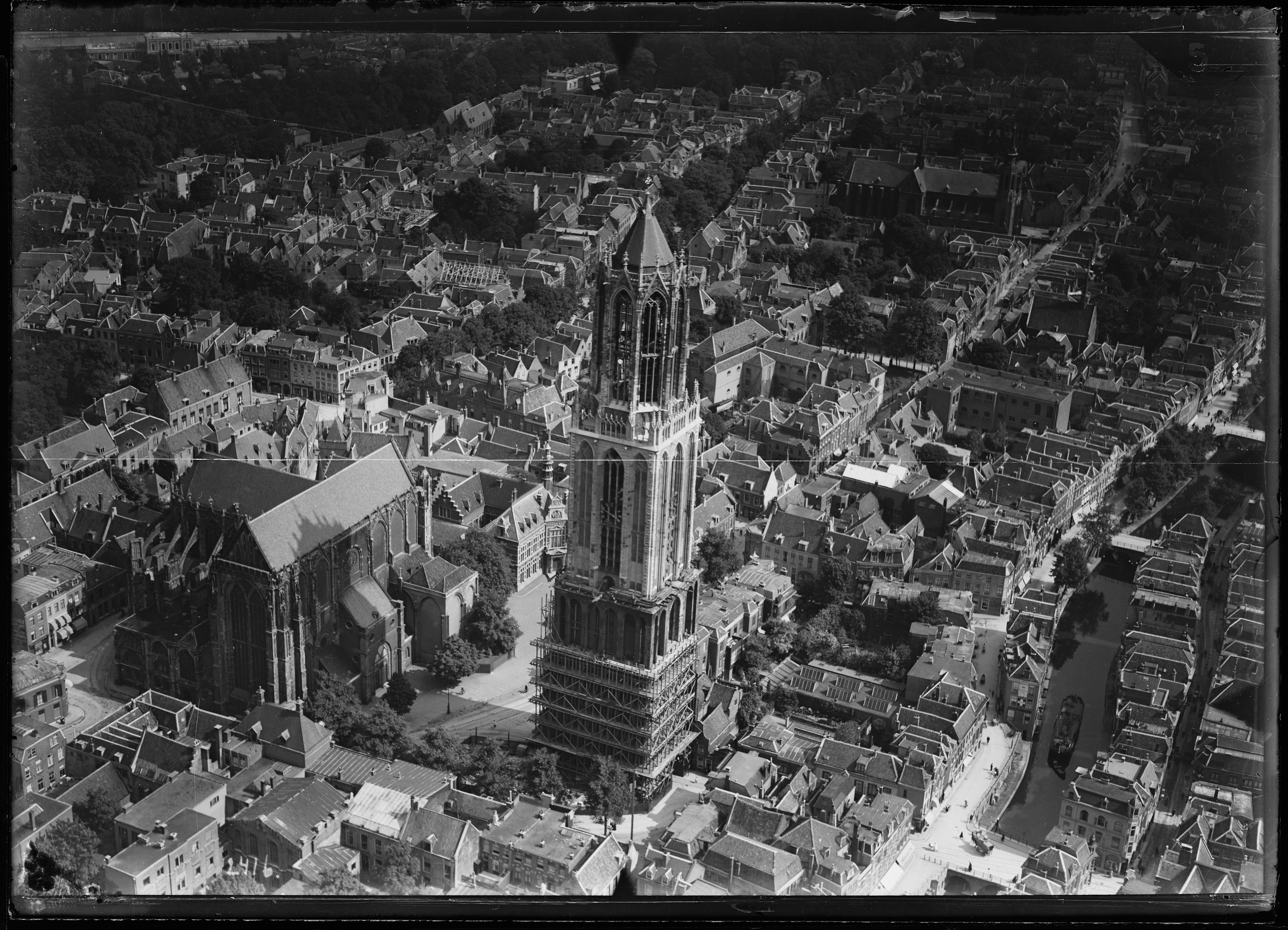
Military aerial view of Domplein and its environs, 1920–1940. Nederlands Instituut voor Militaire Historie.

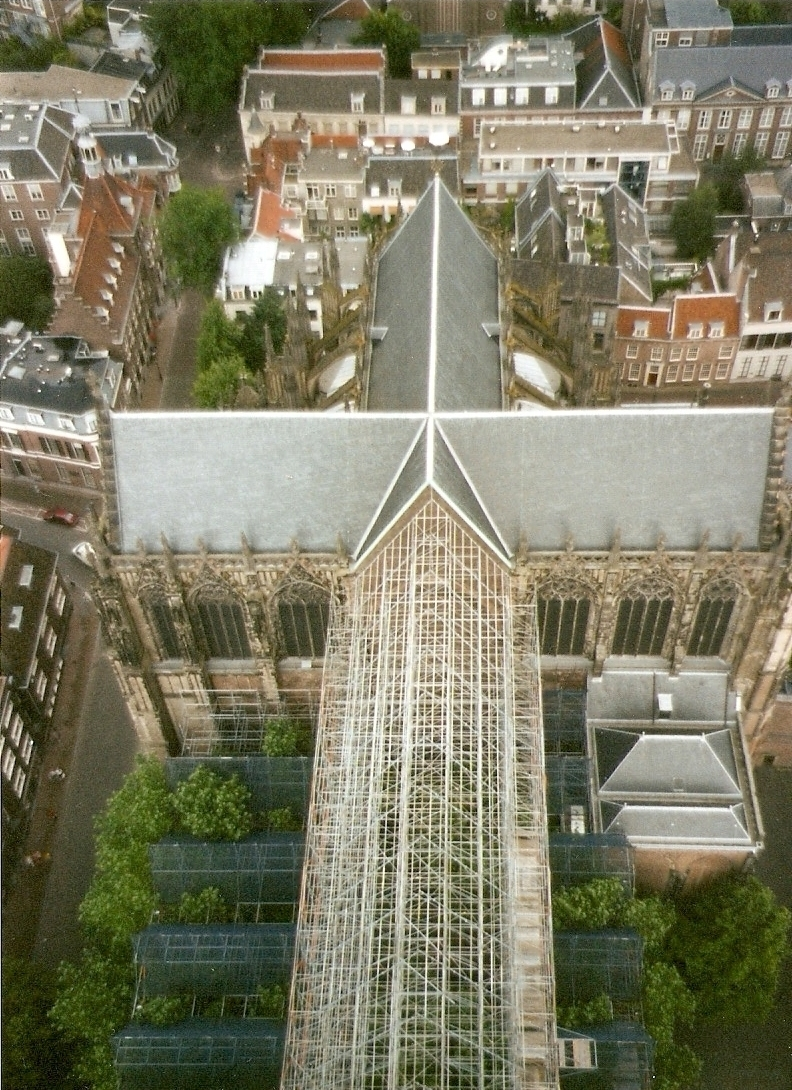
The church as seen from the tower, in front the temporarily rebuilt section, 2004

== Present-day church ==
What remains of St. Martin's today are the choir, the transept and the Dom Tower. The central nave of the cathedral, which collapsed in the storm of 1674, is now a square with large trees, the Domplein, and the wider vicinity is known as the Domkwartier. Stones in the pavement in various colours indicate the original outlines of the church.

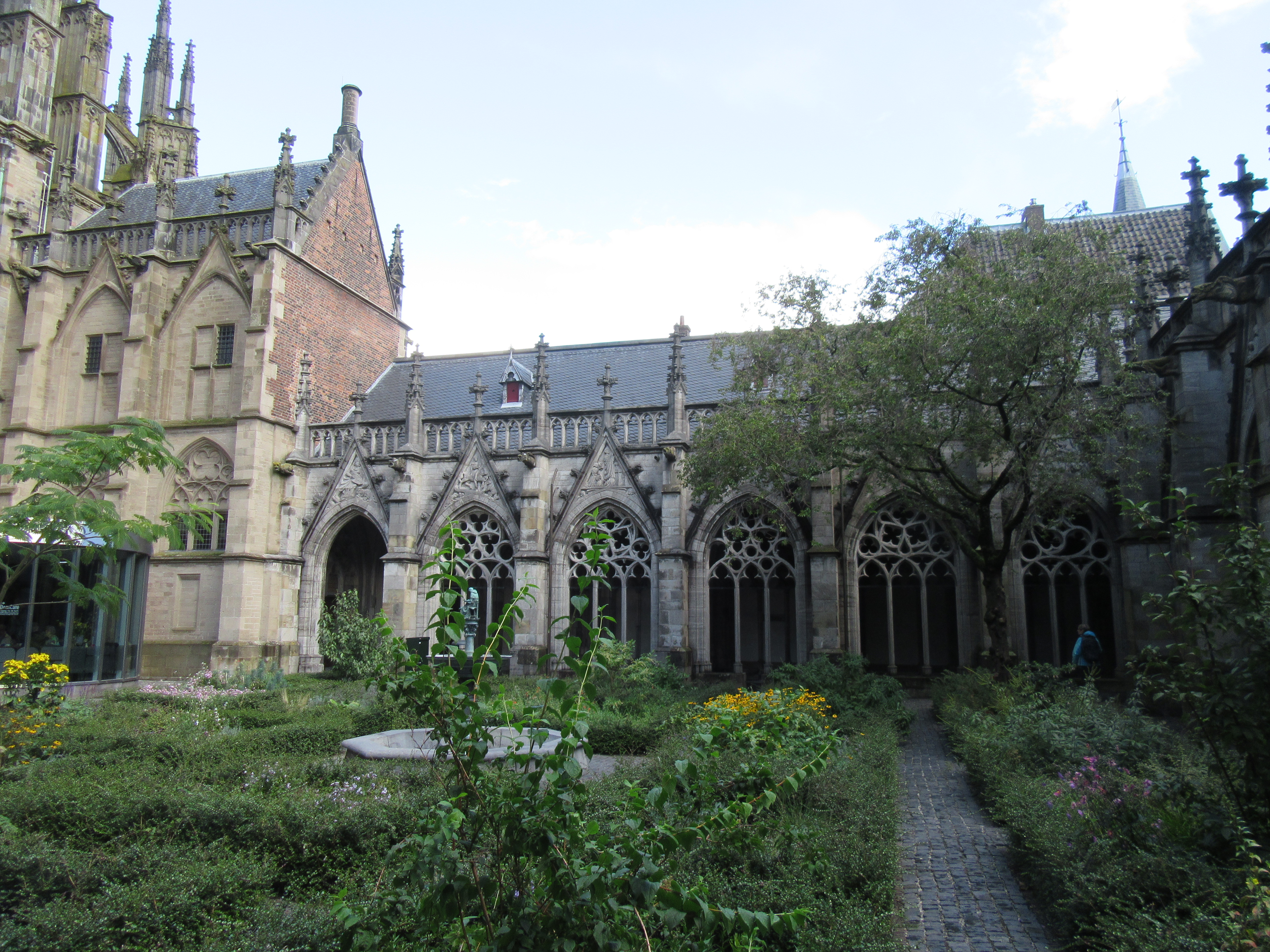
Cloister of St Martin's Cathedral, Utrecht

The cloister and a chapter house to the south, the latter of which is now an important hall of Utrecht University, are also still intact in their original form and standing. The Union of Utrecht, a founding document of the Republic of the Seven United Netherlands, was signed in the chapter house.

In 2013, a project started to expose the cathedral's archaeological artifacts.

Since 2019, the Dom tower has been undergoing major renovations. When the church spire was temporarily removed, between November 2021 and July 2022, the Nieuwe Kerk in Delft briefly became the church with the tallest tower in the Netherlands. The renovation works were completed in 2024 and the tower was officially opened with new lighting in November 2024.

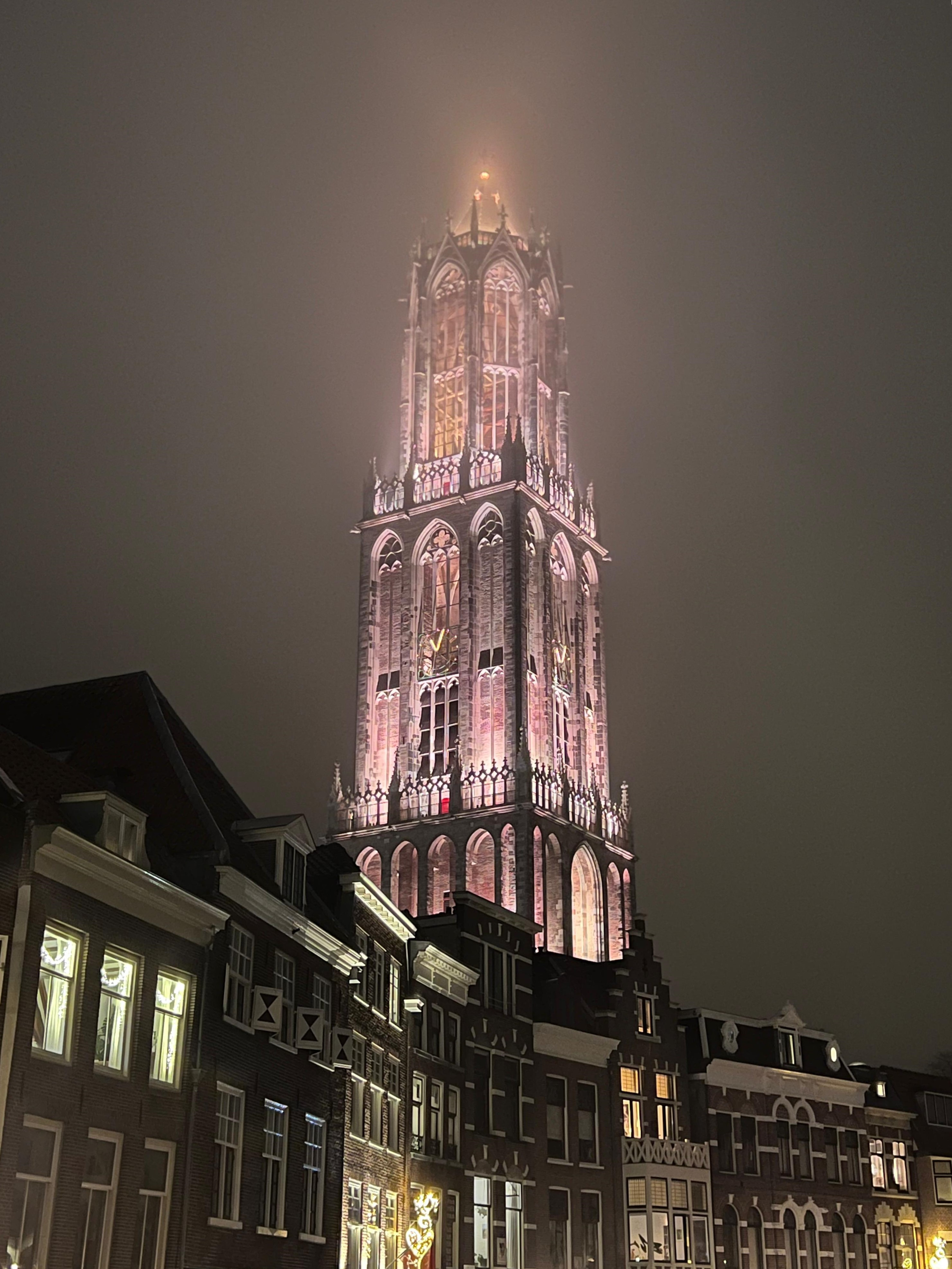
Domtower after restoration with new lighting in November 2024

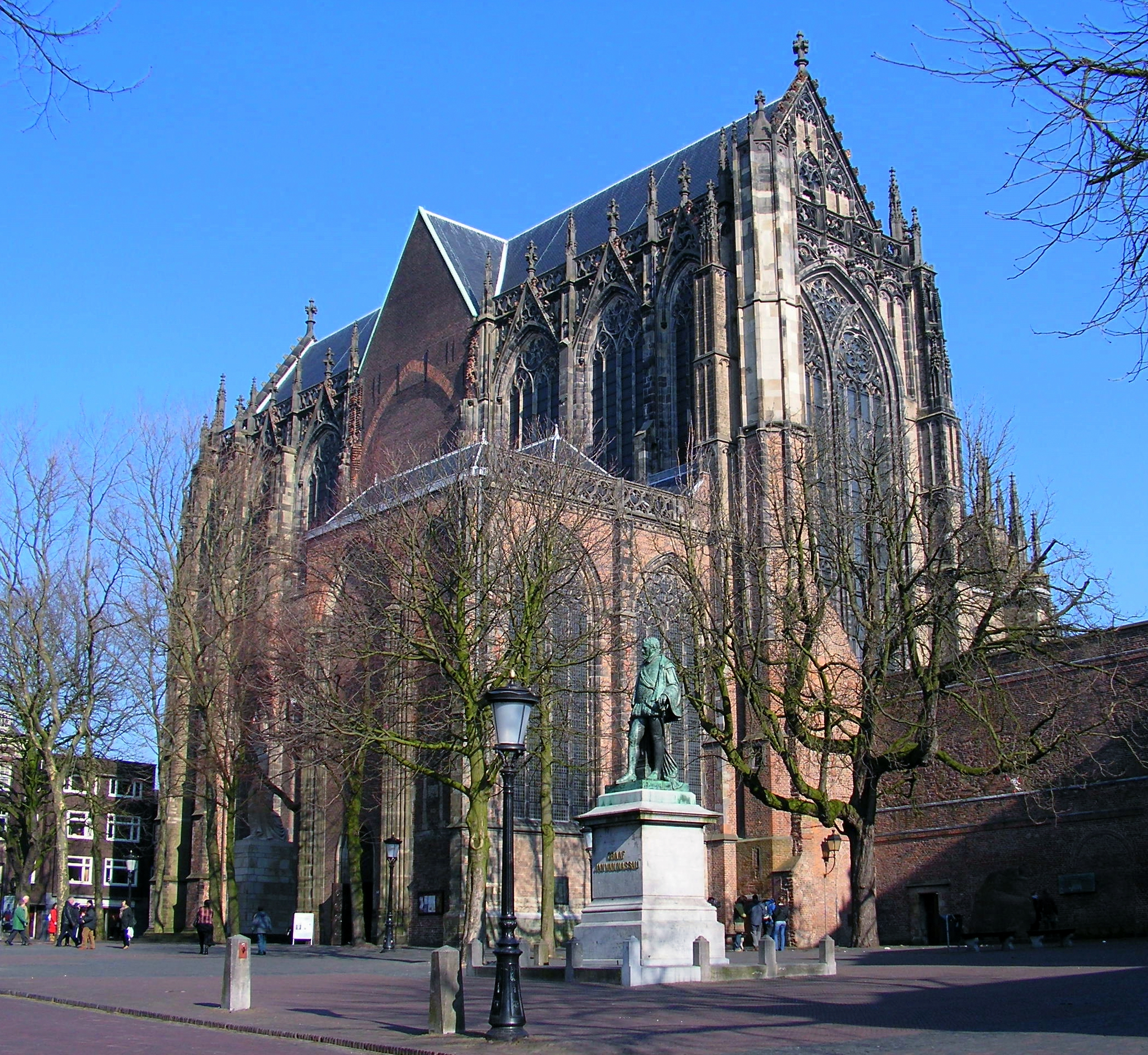
Exterior of St. Martin's Cathedral

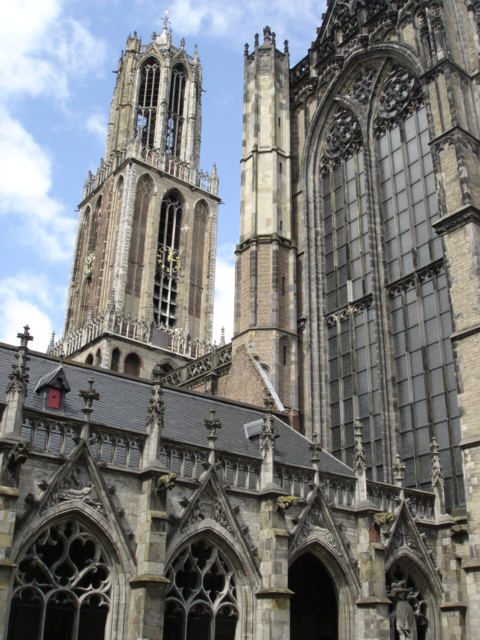
View from the cloister

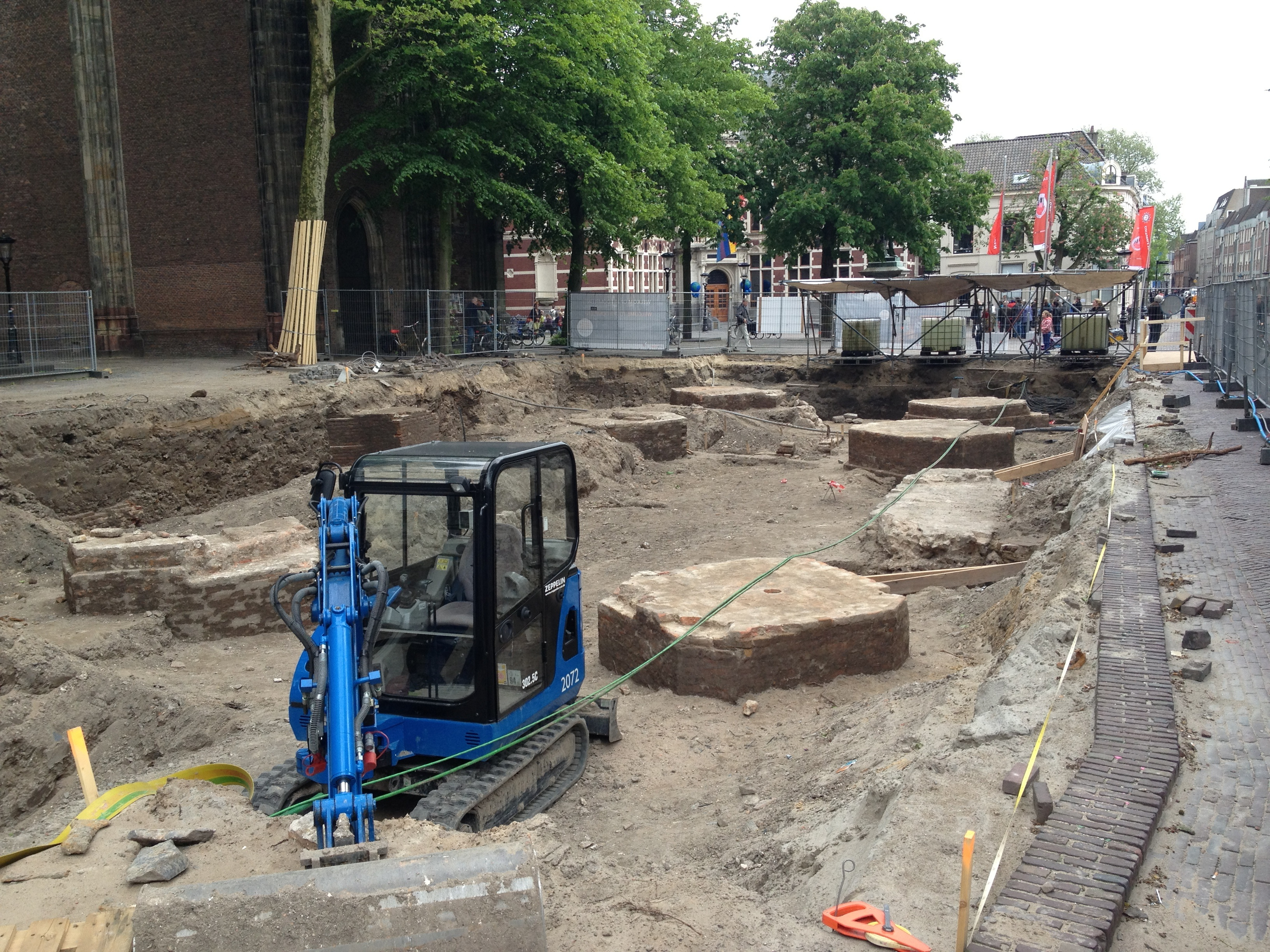
Excavation work on the foundations of the central nave pillars, 2013

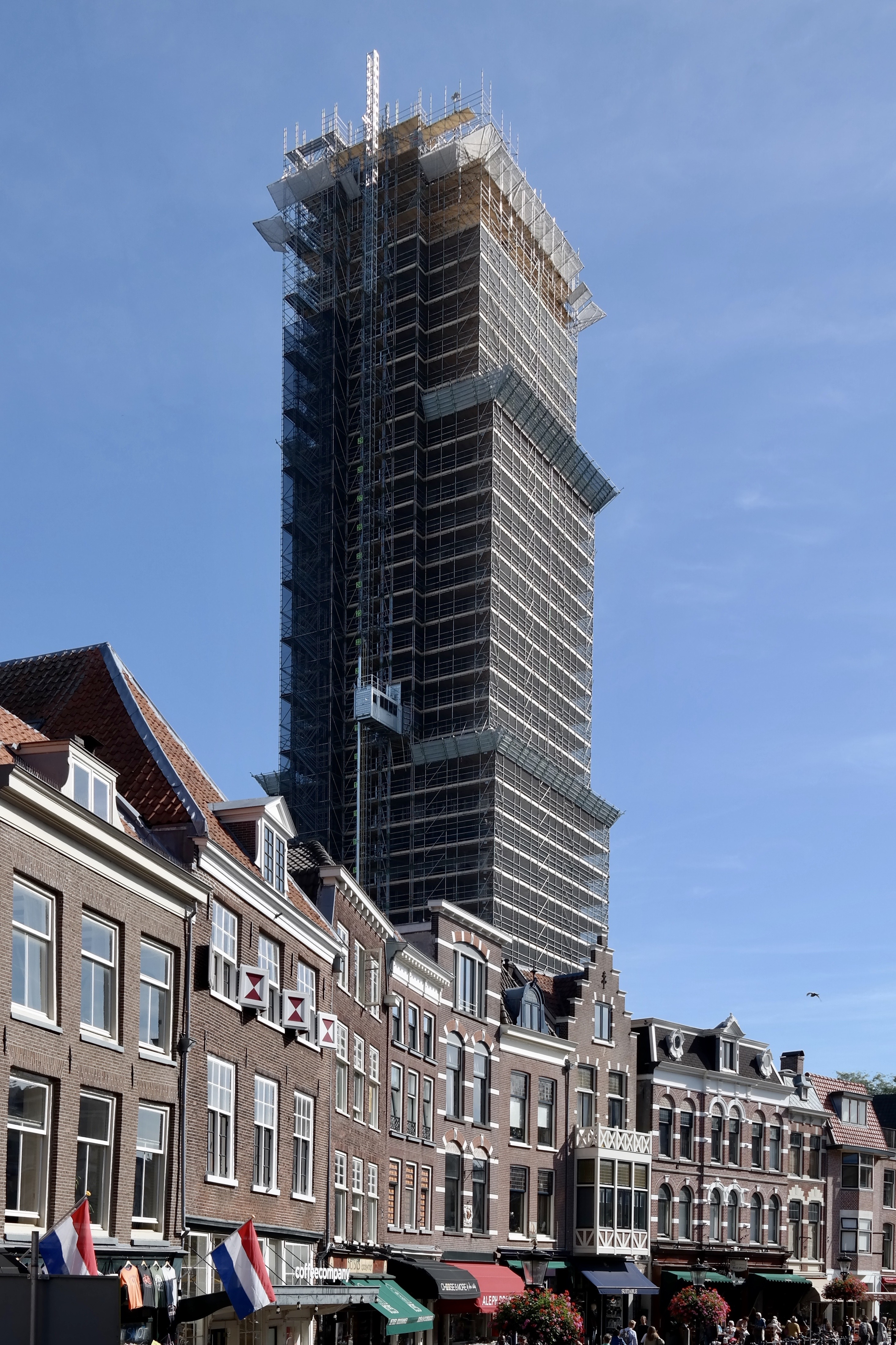
Dom tower under renovation, 2019

== Burials and memorials in the Dom ==
Utrecht was an important city in the western Holy Roman Empire and had particularly close links to the imperial Salian dynasty. In the early Middle Ages, the Holy Roman Emperor was always an honorary canon of the cathedral. The Emperor Conrad II and the Emperor Henry V both died in Utrecht, in 1039 and 1125 respectively. Their bowels and hearts were interred in the cathedral. The modest "Emperors' stones" (keizerssteentjes) in the floor of the choir of the cathedral are a reminder of this fact.

The only medieval tomb of importance to remain relatively unscathed in the cathedral is that of the 14th-century Bishop Guy of Avesnes – the brother of John II, Count of Holland, Hainaut, and Zeeland.

There are many other beautifully carved burial slabs and memorials in the cathedral. Of particular note is the monumental cenotaph, which contained the heart of the 16th-century Bishop George van Egmond.

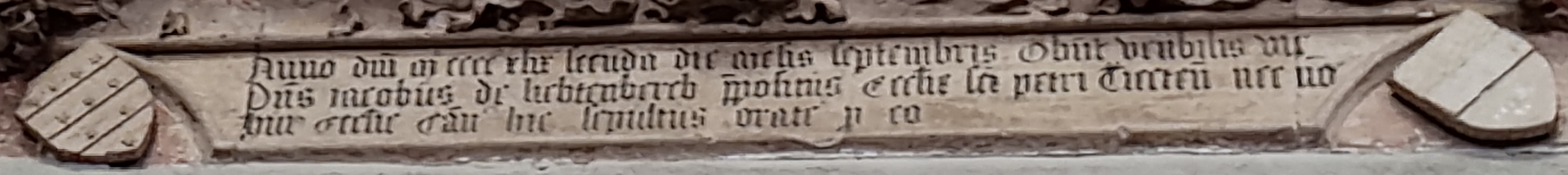
Epitaph for the Provost and Canon Jacob van Lichtenberg (around 1384–1449), illegitimate father of Utrecht poet and anchorite Suster Bertken (1426–1514), 2023.
