= William de Croÿ (bishop) =

French cardinal and clergyman (1497–1521)

His Eminence William de Croÿ
- Archbishop of Toledo; Primate of Spain
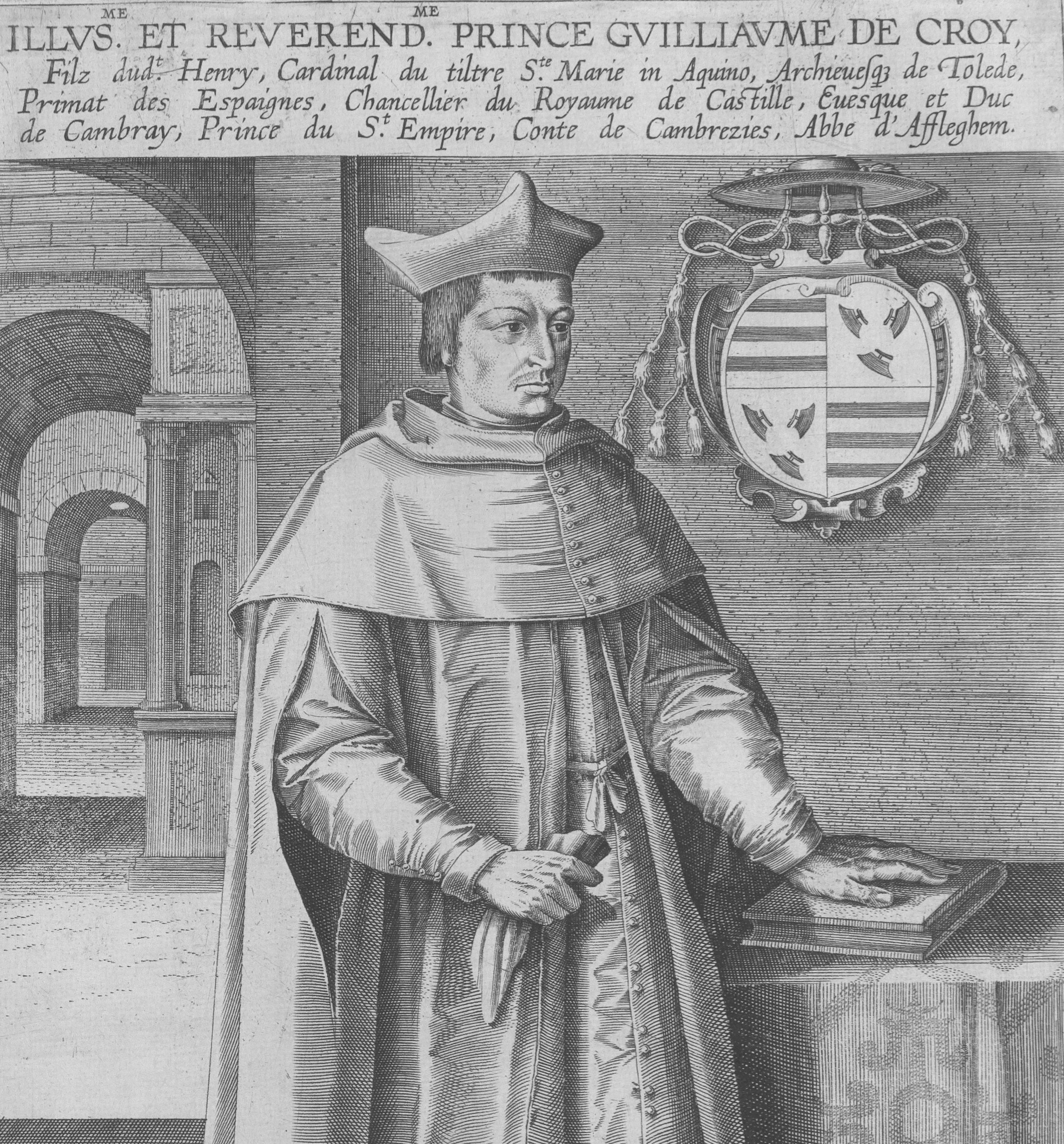
- Engraving depicting Cardinal de Croÿ, 17th century
- Church: Catholic Church
- Archdiocese: Toledo
- Appointed: 18 August 1517
- Term ended: 6 January 1521
- Predecessor: Francisco Jiménez de Cisneros
- Successor: Alonso de Fonseca
- Other posts: Cardinal-Deacon of Santa Maria in Aquiro (1517-1521)
- Previous posts: Prince-Bishop of Cambrai (1516-1519)

Orders
- Created cardinal: 1 April 1517 by Pope Leo X
- Rank: Cardinal-Deacon

Personal details
- Born: Guillaume de Croÿ; 1497 Flanders, Habsburg Netherlands
- Died: 6 January 1521 (aged 23–24) Worms, Germany (then part of the Bishopric of Worms)
- Coat of arms

Cardinal Guillaume, Guillermo or William de Croÿ (1497 – 6 January 1521), a member of the noble House of Croÿ, was Prince-Bishop of Cambrai from 1516 to 1519 and Archbishop of Toledo from 1517 to 1521. He was born in the Habsburg Netherlands and died in Worms, Germany.

== Family and early life ==
William de Croÿ was the son of Henry de Croÿ, count of Porcien, and Charlotte de Châteaubriant. One of his uncles was the powerful William de Croÿ, Lord of Chièvres, a leading adviser to the future Holy Roman Emperor, Charles of Ghent. Another was Jacques de Croÿ, prince-bishop of Cambrai. The young William was tutored by the Spanish humanist Juan Luis Vives. He matriculated at the University of Leuven on 3 September 1511. He was later the dedicatee of Vives' Meditationes (Leuven, 1518), and of Jacobus Latomus' De trium linguarum (Antwerp, 1519), both figures who had mentored him at university.

== Ecclesiastical career ==
In 1516, aged only 18, Croÿ was elected bishop of Cambrai in succession to his uncle Jacques. This appointment made him duke of Cambrai, count of Cambrésis, and a prince of the Holy Roman Empire. On 1 April 1517, Pope Leo X appointed him cardinal deacon of Santa Maria in Aquiro. From 1518 he also held the title of Abbot of Affligem, making him the most senior member of the First Estate in the States of Brabant.

On 8 November 1517, the Archbishop of Toledo, Cardinal Francisco Jiménez de Cisneros, died. The Archbishopric of Toledo was the richest and most powerful in Spain. The main claimant to succeed Cisneros was Alonso de Aragón, Archbishop of Saragossa, who was King Ferdinand II of Aragon's illegitimate son and young King Charles's half-uncle. However, the seventeen-year-old Charles's biggest influence was still the Lord of Chièvres, who maneuvered his twenty-year-old nephew into the Archbishopric, making him primate of Spain and chancellor of Castile. The decision was taken on 9 November, but the appointment was only made in the first week of 1518. Complications were caused by Queen Isabella I of Castile's will specifically prohibiting the granting of ecclesiastical offices to foreigners. Charles resolved this problem by issuing a writ of naturalization on 14 November declaring William a Castilian. Pope Leo X had granted an indult on 12 October freeing William from any current or future residency requirement to an office. It had been originally meant to legitimize his holding of the Bishopric of Soria, and was now used to justify the Archbishopric of Toledo.

Croÿ's appointment was immensely scandalous in Castile. Cisneros had been universally respected, and William was an unknown foreign boy. The outrage at this act of patronage would be one of the many sparks of the Revolt of the Comuneros in 1520. The representatives at the Cortes of Valladolid in 1518 presented petitions protesting the act, demanding that no further foreigners be granted naturalization writs and that Croÿ reside in his see. Charles agreed, but while Croÿ resigned Cambrai in preparation (in favour of his own brother, Robert de Croÿ), he never got as far as visiting Spain, let alone Toledo.

== Death ==
William was injured by a fall from his horse on 6 January 1521 while out hunting. He was at the time attending upon the Emperor in preparation for the Diet of Worms, which would open a few weeks later. William died later the same day, aged 23. His death was only publicly announced on 11 January, which is sometimes incorrectly given as his date of death. After a funeral service in Worms on 21 January, his body was transported to the Low Countries and buried in the church of the Celestines in Heverlee, a community that his father had founded.

On 16 February, Erasmus wrote to Guillaume Budé about his death, saying that "with his whole heart he loved liberal studies"; Croÿ had corresponded with Erasmus, who in 1519 had given the young bishop a tour of his library and drunk a cup of friendship with him.

News of Croÿ's death had reached Spain by 25 January, and there it provoked a clamor. Antonio Osorio de Acuña, bishop of Zamora and comunero rebel, dropped his campaign in the North of Castile around Palencia to head south to Toledo and attempt to succeed William as archbishop. The comuneros were eventually defeated, however, and Alonso III Fonseca became the new Archbishop of Toledo in 1523. Croÿ went largely unlamented in Castile. Diego López Pacheco, the Marquis of Villena, had been one of the very few nobles to support his appointment, likely in an attempt to gain the elder Croÿ's favor. A contemporary account by Alonso de Santa Cruz, historiographer royal to King Philip II, said that "it was a just judgment of God that neither did Croy enjoy the archbishopric nor was the Marquis restored."

== Sources ==
- Bartlett, Kenneth R.; McGlynn, Margaret (2014). The Renaissance and Reformation in Northern Europe. Toronto: University of Toronto Press.
- Fisquet, Honoré (1864). La France pontificale (Gallia Christiana): Cambrai. Paris: Étienne Repos. pp. 228–230.
- Haliczer, Stephen (1981). The Comuneros of Castile: The Forging of a Revolution, 1475-1521. Madison, Wisconsin: University of Wisconsin Press. p. 138. ISBN 0-299-08500-7.
- Moreau, Gérard (2003). "Guillaume de Croy". In Bietenholz, Peter G.; Deutscher, Thomas Brian (eds.). Contemporaries of Erasmus: A Biographical Register of the Renaissance and Reformation. Vol. 1. Toronto: University of Toronto Press. pp. 369–370.
- Seaver, Henry Latimer (1966) [1928]. The Great Revolt in Castile: A study of the Comunero movement of 1520-1521. New York: Octagon Books. pp. 32–33, 234. ISBN 9780374972394.

Catholic Church titles
Preceded by Jacques de Croÿ	Bishop of Cambrai; 1516–1519	Succeeded by Robert de Croÿ
Preceded by Francisco Jiménez de Cisneros	Archbishop of Toledo; 1517–1521	Succeeded by Alonso III Fonseca
