= Wibold (bishop of Cambrai) =

Wibold or Wibald was the bishop of Cambrai from 971 to 972. He designed a game of dice called ludus regularis to encourage clergy not to gamble.

== Life ==
Wibold was probably born early in the 10th century. According to the Deeds of the Bishops of Cambrai, Wibold was descended from a prominent family of Cambrai. At the time of his election as bishop, he was the archdeacon of the cathedral of Noyon. He devised a "canonical game" (ludus regularis) for his clergy to play instead of dice. The Deeds describes its rules in detail.

After the death of Bishop Ansbert, the leading men of Cambrai sent a letter to Emperor Otto the Great requesting the appointment of Wibold, which was granted. In the summer of 971, Wibold travelled to Italy for his investiture at Otto's hands, but the journey there and back caused his health to decline. He died after a little over a year in office. He left a deluxe copy of the gospels and other books he had acquired in Italy to the cathedral of Cambrai, where he was buried.

== Ludus regularis ==
The account of Wibold's game in the Deeds is in his own words. The game is called the ludus regularis seu clericalis ("canonical or clerical game") and alea regularis contra alea secularis ("canonical game of dice as opposed to the secular game of dice"). It was probably devised while he was archdeacon of Noyon with responsibility for and authority to discipline clergy, who were forbidden to gamble.

Hypothetical game board as drawn by Colvener (1615)

The game requires four dice, three cubical dice and one tetrahedral die. The cubical dice are made in the usual fashion with pips on opposite faces summing to seven, but in addition they are marked with the five vowels AEIOU in three different ways, so that each die is distinct. The tetrahedral die is inscribed with four consonants on each face (BCDF, GHLK, MNPR and STXZ), so that a complete alphabet minus Q is present on the dice. Wibold does not mention a board explicitly, but the mechanics of the game would seem to have required one, as in the game tabula.

The dice are rolled all together. A single roll consists of the top faces of the three cubes, corresponding to a set of three numbers and a set of three vowels or vowel combinations, and the bottom face of a tetrathedron, giving a combination of consonants. The number corresponds to a virtue and the goal of the game is to acquire the most virtues. To acquire a virtue it must be available (i.e., not yet acquired by another player) and one must roll its number in such a way that one also has its vowels and at least one of its consonants. A given roll may be played in more than one way. In the event of a tie, the player with karitas (charity) wins, but it is still possible to end in a stalemate.

There are 56 possible triples of dice to which Wibold assigned virtues, influenced by mystical approach to numbers that goes back to the Pythagoreans, especially Nicomachus of Gerasa, mediated by Christian authors. These would have been arrayed on a board. In their edition of the Deeds, George Colvener and Boëtius Epo proposed three possible game boards.

The mathematicians Richard Pulskamp and Daniel Otero have studied Wibold's game using computer simulations. They show that playing the game as described would usually take about ten hours because of the coupon collector's problem. They suggest that, if ever actually played, gameplay must have been broken into several sessions or else players were allowed to claim as all virtues covered by a given roll in a single turn. That simplification reduces the time needed for a game to only about two hours.

The ludus regularis is a game of pure chance, it thus differs fundamentally from the contemporary strategy game rithmomachia. They were both perceived, however, as having a pedagogical value or, in Wibold's words, giving men "practice with the combination of numbers".

== Bibliography ==
- Bachrach, Bernard S.; Bachrach, David S.; Leese, Michael, eds. (2018). Deeds of the Bishops of Cambrai: Translation and Commentary. Routledge.
- Cardoso, Carla (2023). "Ludus Regularis: The Clergy Game". Board Game Studies Journal. 17 (1): 47–92. doi:10.2478/bgs-2023-0002.
- Moyer, Ann E. (2001). The Philosopher's Game: Rithmomachia in Medieval and Renaissance Europe. University of Michigan Press.
- Pulskamp, Richard; Otero, Daniel (2014). "Wibold's Ludus Regularis, a 10th Century Board Game". Convergence (June). Mathematical Association of America. doi:10.4169/convergence20140601.
