= 816 =

Calendar year

816 in various calendars
Gregorian calendar	816; DCCCXVI
Ab urbe condita	1569
Armenian calendar	265; ԹՎ ՄԿԵ
Assyrian calendar	5566
Balinese saka calendar	737–738
Bengali calendar	222–223
Berber calendar	1766
Buddhist calendar	1360
Burmese calendar	178
Byzantine calendar	6324–6325
Chinese calendar	乙未年 (Wood Goat); 3513 or 3306 — to — 丙申年 (Fire Monkey); 3514 or 3307
Coptic calendar	532–533
Discordian calendar	1982
Ethiopian calendar	808–809
Hebrew calendar	4576–4577
- Hindu calendars
Vikram Samvat	872–873
Shaka Samvat	737–738
Kali Yuga	3916–3917
Holocene calendar	10816
Iranian calendar	194–195
Islamic calendar	200–201
Japanese calendar	Kōnin 7 (弘仁７年)
Javanese calendar	712–713
Julian calendar	816; DCCCXVI
Korean calendar	3149
Minguo calendar	1096 before ROC 民前1096年
Nanakshahi calendar	−652
Seleucid era	1127/1128 AG
Thai solar calendar	1358–1359
Tibetan calendar	ཤིང་མོ་ལུག་ལོ་ (female Wood-Sheep); 942 or 561 or −211 — to — མེ་ཕོ་སྤྲེ་ལོ་ (male Fire-Monkey); 943 or 562 or −210

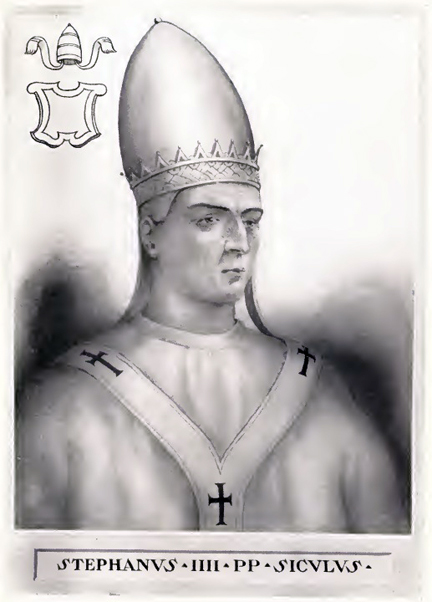
Pope Stephen IV (c. 770–817)

Year 816 (DCCCXVI) was a leap year starting on Tuesday of the Julian calendar, the 816th year of the Common Era (CE) and Anno Domini (AD) designations, the 816th year of the 1st millennium, the 16th year of the 9th century, and the 7th year of the 810s decade.

== Events ==
=== By place ===
==== Europe ====
- October 5 – King Louis the Pious (son of Charlemagne) is crowned emperor of the Holy Roman Empire, by Pope Stephen IV at Reims. He also crowns the emperor's wife Ermengarde as Holy Roman Empress. The ceremony in Reims re-establishes the principle of papal supremacy, by recognising the importance of the pope in imperial coronations. Louis gives the pope many gifts, including the estate tax Vendeuvre, near Troyes (Northern France).
- Vikings raid Ireland at the Kingdom of Munster, at Inish Cathaigh.
- Battle of Pancorbo: A Moorish army from the Emirate of Córdoba is sent by Emir Al-Hakam I, to take control of the pass at Pancorbo. They defeat the army of Asturian-Basque Frankish vassals.
- Winter – The Basques, supported by the Moors, cross the Garonne River and revolt against the Franks in Gascony (north of the Pyrenees).

==== Britain ====
- King Hywel of Gwynedd is attacked by his brother Cynan on Anglesey (modern Wales), who is killed during the fighting (approximate date).

==== Abbasid Caliphate ====
- Babak Khorramdin, Persian military leader, revolts against the Abbasid Caliphate in Azerbaijan (approximate date).

=== By topic ===
==== Religion ====
- Synod of Aachen: Louis the Pious calls for a council about the regulations (Institutio canonicorum Aquisgranensis) for monastic life in the Frankish Empire.
- Synod of Chelsea: King Coenwulf of Mercia calls for a council about his right to appoint abbots and monasteries in England.
- June 12 – Pope Leo III dies after a 20-year reign, and is succeeded by Pope Stephen IV as the 97th pope of Rome.

== Births ==
- Formosus, pope of the Catholic Church (approximate date)
- Henjō, Japanese waka poet (d. 890)

== Deaths ==
- June 12 – Leo III, pope of the Catholic Church (b. 750)
- October 28 – Beggo, count of Toulouse and Paris
- Cynan Dindaethwy, king of Gwynedd (Wales)
- Fātimah bint Mūsā, Muslim saint (b. 790)
- Harthama ibn A'yan, Muslim governor
- Hildoard, archbishop of Cambrai
- Li He, Chinese poet (b. 790)
- Empress Dowager Wang (Xianzong), Chinese empress
- Wulfar, archbishop of Reims
