= Erluin of Cambrai =

Erluin or Erlwin (died 1012) was the bishop of Cambrai from 995. In 1007 he acquired secular authority in the county of the Cambrésis from the Emperor Henry II.

Erluin studied in the famous school of Liège, where he became archdeacon under Bishop Notker (972–1008), who procured his election to the bishopric of Cambrai.

In 1006, Count Baldwin IV of Flanders invaded the Empire and captured Valenciennes. Erluin appealed to the emperor, who invaded Flanders, captured Ghent and threatened to take the city's relics, but Baldwin remained in possession of Valenciennes. Erluin also appealed to Baldwin's lord, King Robert II of France, whose troops looted Arras, but forced Baldwin to abandon Valenciennes in 1007. The next year (1008), Erluin, supported by the emperor and the leading men of Lower Lorraine, arranged the reform of the Abbey of Saint-Vaast under the famous reforming monk Richard of Saint-Vanne.

In 1007, Henry gave Erluin comital authority in the entire region of the Cambrésis, to the chagrin of Walter of Lens, the castellan of Arras and a leading regional nobleman. The bishops of Cambrai had possessed comital authority within the city itself since 948, when the Emperor Otto I granted it to Bishop Fulbert (934–56) for his successful defence of the city from the Magyar invaders in 945.

In 1011, Erluin refused a request by the dying castellan of Arras that his son, Walter II, be enfeoffed with his lands by the bishop in exchange for an oath of fealty. The bishop demanded reparations for the various injustices the castellan had committed. The castellan failed to get his vassals and allies, including the count of Flanders, to fight before he died; Walter II swore the oath. Erluin died soon after, and was succeeded by Gerard of Florennes.
