= Gerard II (bishop of Cambrai) =

11th-century French bishop

Gerard II (c. 1020 – 11 or 12 August 1092), sometimes Gerard of Lessines, was the thirty-third bishop of Cambrai from 1076 and the last who was also bishop of Arras. He was a prince-bishop of the Holy Roman Empire, and his episcopacy coincided with the beginning of the Investiture Controversy between emperor and pope.

An account of Gerard's episcopacy was recorded in the Gesta Gerardi secundi episcopi (Deeds of Bishop Gerard the Second) by one of the continuators of the Gesta episcoporum Cameracensium (Deeds of the Bishops of Cambrai).

== Provost of Saint-Vaast ==
Gerard was probably descended from the lords of Lessines in the County of Flanders. He was related to both of his predecessors, Lietbert (his uncle) and Gerard I. He was "German in language in culture", as his Germanic name indicates, and his diocese lay on the Germano-Romance frontier. Prior to his election as bishop, he was a monk and provost of the abbey of Saint-Vaast under Abbot Adolf.

== Bishop of Cambrai ==
=== Election and consecration ===
Gerard was canonically elected after the death of Lietbert on 22 or 23 June 1076. As was the custom for bishops of Cambrai, he went to receive investiture with the symbols of his office from the Emperor Henry IV in July. He was likewise invested with secular authority in the county of the Cambrésis. Unfortunately for him, in February 1075 the Council of Rome had condemned the investiture of bishops by laymen and in February 1076 Pope Gregory VII had excommunicated the emperor. When Gerard went to his metropolitan, Archbishop Manasses I of Reims, to receive consecration, he was refused.

In the spring of 1077 Gerard travelled to Rome to plead his case to Pope Gregory, claiming that he was unaware that his investiture was irregular. Gregory refused to meet him, but ordered his legate, Bishop Hugh of Die, to call a regional council at Autun to decide the case. Gerard swore an oath before the council that he was unaware both of Henry IV's excommunication and of the canons of the council of Rome at the time of his investiture, and that he would uphold the Gregorian reforms. The council concluded in September with a threat to depose bishops who consecrated clergy invested by laymen. Since Manasses had not attended, Hugh suspended him and himself consecrated Gerard, whose election was declared valid.

=== Secular politics ===
During Gerard's absence in Rome and Autun, an urban revolt broke out in Cambrai. The citizens formed a commune and bound themselves by an oath not to readmit the bishop. With the help of Count Baldwin II of Hainaut, Gerard suppressed the revolt and executed the leaders.

He also had to contend with the encroachments of the castellan of Cambrai, Hugh I of Oisy. With the help of Count Robert I of Flanders, he succeeded in exiling Hugh to England between about 1086 and 1090.

=== Reform and renewal at Cambrai ===
Although many of the priests of the cathedral chapter were kinsmen of Gerard, they were also guilty of simony and nicolaitism and strongly resisted the bishop's efforts to promote the Gregorian reform.

In 1080, Gerard was appointed by the pope to a council to judge Manasses of Reims. In 1082, the pope ordered him to admonish the count of Flanders against supporting Lambert of Bailleul, the bishop of Thérouanne, who had been deposed and excommunicated for simony and apostasy. Until a new bishop was elected in 1083, Gerard administered the vacant diocese.

Gerard attended the Council of Soissons (1084) and the Council of Compiègne (1085).

Gerard restored the cathedral of Notre Dame and the hospital of Saint Julien in Cambrai. He helped found the abbeys of Anchin (1079) and Affligem (1086). He also revised the charters of his diocese to disencumber ecclesiastical benefices from personal obligations.

Gerard also dealt with the heretic Ramihrd, who is only mentioned by name in the Chronicon sancti Andreae castri Cameracesii (Chronicle of Saint-André du Cateau), written by an anonymous monk around 1133.
