= Hugh I of Oisy =

Hugh I of Oisy (died circa 1111) was the castellan of the town of Cambrai who rebelled against the authority of the bishops of the city. Hugh's family was of seigneurial rank, originating in Oisy and Inchy, and had provided most of the castellans of Cambrai during the eleventh and twelfth centuries.

Before 1076, Hugh rebelled against the bishop Lietbert and was excommunicated. The bishop refused to lift the ban "unless [Hugh] first consents to renounce with his own hands—werpire, to use the common expression—every fief which he holds in the city of Cambrai." The ceremony of werpitio (in French déguerpissement) generally involved handing over a symbol of the fief to the one from whom it had been received.

Hugh continued to encroach on the authority of the bishop within the city during the episcopate of Gerard II. Since both the French king, Philip I, and the dowager countess of Hainaut, Richilda, were opposed to increased imperial influence—represented by the bishop of Cambrai—in the county of Flanders, they supported Hugh in his rebellion. With the help of Richilda's rival, Count Robert I of Flanders, the bishop succeeded in exiling Hugh to England between about 1086 and 1090.
