= Gerard of Cambrai =

Gerard of Cambrai may refer to:

- Gerard of Florennes, bishop of Cambrai from 1012 to 1051
- Gerard II (bishop of Cambrai), bishop from 1076 to 1092
- Gérard de Dainville, bishop of Cambrai from 1371 to 1378
