= François Buisseret =

- Archbishop-Duke of Cambrai
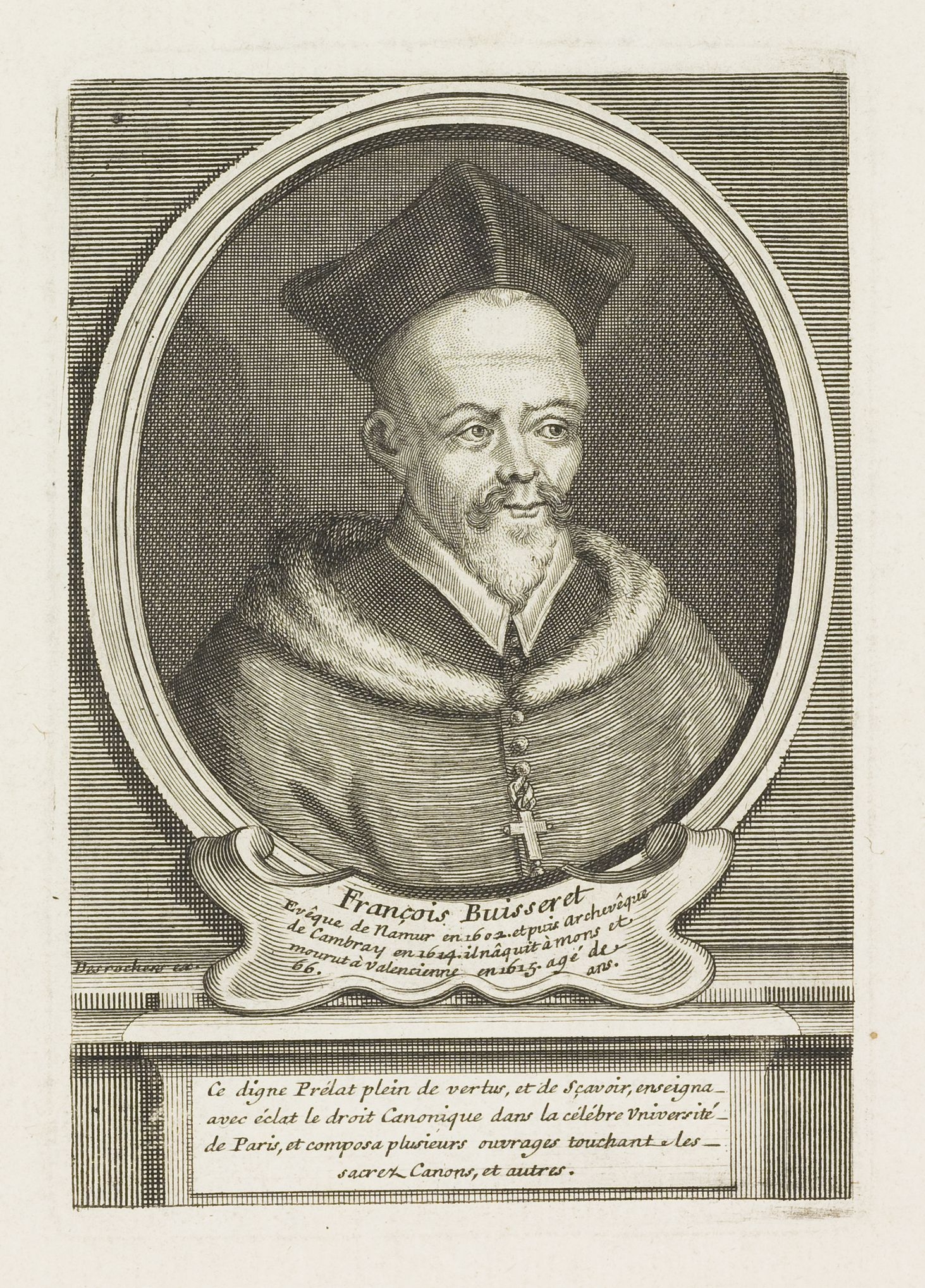
- Diocese: Cambrai
- See: Notre Dame de Cambrai
- Elected: 24 March 1614
- Installed: 24 March 1615
- Term ended: 2 May 1615
- Predecessor: Jean Richardot
- Successor: Franciscus van der Burch
- Previous post: Bishop of Namur (1602–1614)

Orders
- Consecration: 1602

Personal details
- Born: 1549 Mons, County of Hainaut, Habsburg Netherlands
- Died: 2 May 1615 (aged 65–66) Valenciennes, County of Hainaut, Habsburg Netherlands
- Buried: Old Cambrai Cathedral
- Education: Leuven University

François Buisseret (1549–1615) was a clergyman from the Habsburg Netherlands who became bishop of Namur and archbishop of Cambrai.

== Life ==
Buisseret was born in Mons in September 1549. His father died when he was young and his mother sent him to school at the collegiate church of St Germain in Mons (abolished in 1799). He matriculated at Leuven University as a student of Lily College at the age of 16. Two years later he graduated second of his year, and at the age of 18 was appointed lecturer on philosophy in his college. He followed classes with Robert Bellarmine, and also studied in the faculty of law. Appointed to a canonry of Cambrai Cathedral, he obtained a leave of absence for two years to travel in Italy, spending time in Rome and Bologna, where he was ordained priest and graduated doctor of both laws.

After taking up his position in Cambrai he was obliged to flee the city when it was occupied by the French. In 1580 he joined the archbishop, Louis de Berlaymont, in Mons, where he had temporarily relocated his see. Buisseret served in turn as diocesan official, archdeacon, dean and vicar general. As archdeacon he was involved in the exorcisms of Jeanne Fery in 1584–1585. He founded a Sunday school in Mons and wrote a catechism that continued in use there into the 19th century. In 1586 Bishop Berlaymont chaired a provincial synod in Mons that commissioned Buisseret to compile an updated overview of the canon laws applicable in the archdiocese. Buisseret would have been elected archbishop in 1598, but withdrew in favour of Guillaume de Berghes.

In 1602 Buisseret was appointed bishop of Namur, receiving episcopal consecration in Saint Waltrude Collegiate Church in Mons. As bishop of Namur, Buisseret founded a Sunday school, admitted a Jesuit college, and established convents. He held two diocesan synods, in 1604 and 1605. On 24 March 1614 he was elected archbishop of Cambrai, in succession to Jean Richardot. Before taking up the position he made a retreat at Brogne Abbey. He took possession of his see on 24 March 1615 and immediately undertook a visitation of his diocese, but died at Valenciennes on 2 May 1615. He was buried in the choir of Cambrai Cathedral.

== Publications ==
- Discours admirable et veritable des choses advenues en la ville de Mons (Douai, Jan Bogard, 1586), an account of the exorcism of Jeanne Fery, later translated into Dutch (Leuven, 1587) and German (Munich, 1589).
- Déclaration de la doctrine chrétienne (Mons, Charles Michel, 1587), also known as the Catechism of the Diocese of Cambrai.
- Oraison funèbre sur le trespas et inhumation de très-illustre et excellent seigneur messire Emmanuel de Lalaing, marquis de Renty (Mons, Charles Michel, 1591), a funeral oration for Emanuel Philibert de Lalaing.
- Decreta synodi dioecesanae Namurcensis anno Domini M.DC.IIII (Leuven, 1605)
- Gallo-Brabantia (Brussel, Mommaert, Jan I, 1606) online
- Histoire de la vie, miracles, et translation de Sainte-Marie d'Oingnies (Leuven, Rivius, 1609), a life of Marie of Oignies.

Catholic Church titles
Preceded by Jacques Blaseus	Bishop of Namur; 1602–1614	Succeeded by Jean Dauvin
Preceded by Jean Richardot	Archbishop of Cambrai; 1614–1615	Succeeded by Franciscus van der Burch
