= Jean Sarazin =

Joannes Saracenus
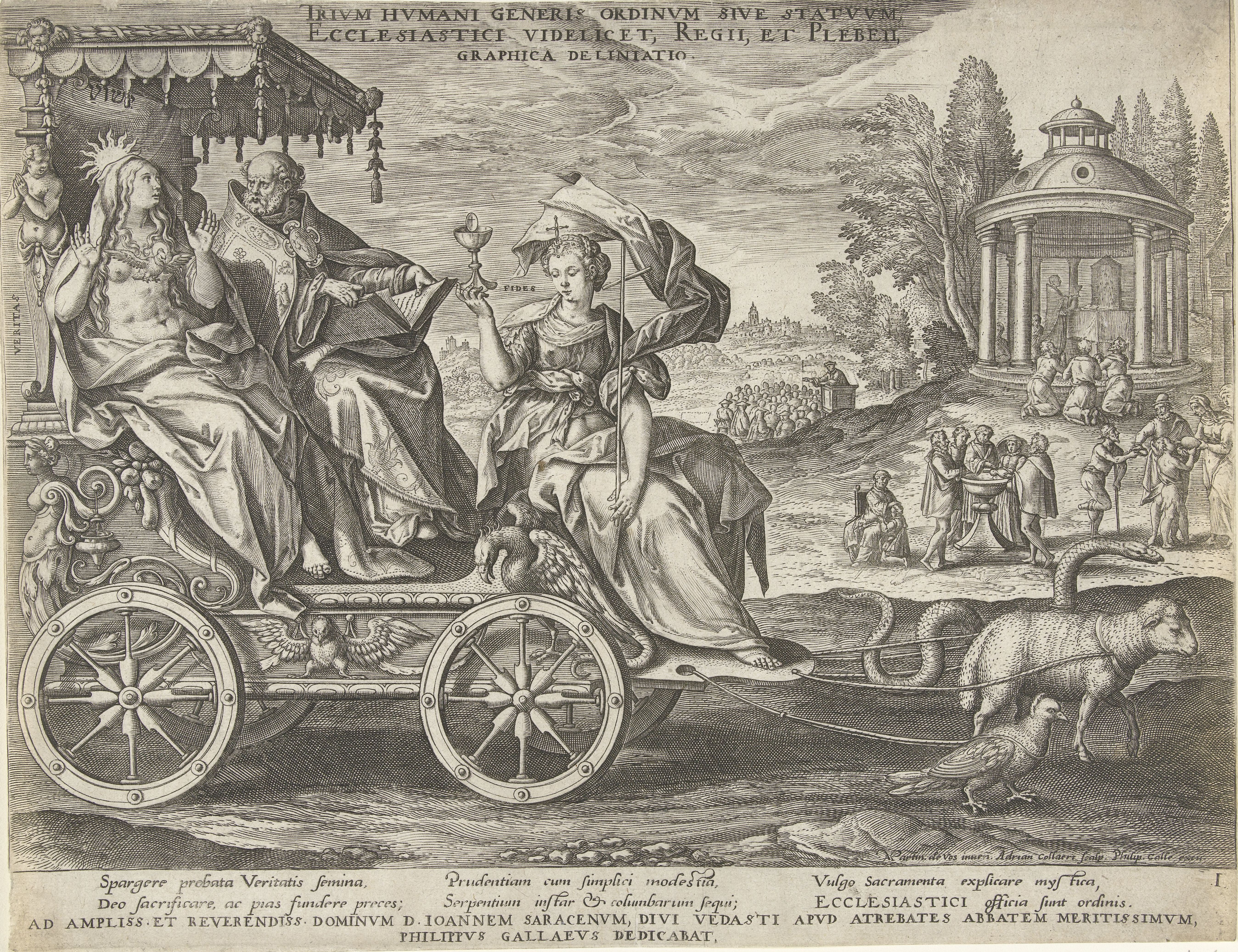
- Allegory of the First Estate, engraved by Adriaen Collaert after Maerten de Vos and published by Philip Galle; dedicated to Jean Sarazin
- Native name: Jean Sarazin
- Church: Catholic
- Archdiocese: Archdiocese of Cambrai
- See: Nôtre Dame Sainte Marie de Cambrai
- Elected: 6 March 1596
- Predecessor: Louis de Berlaymont
- Successor: Guillaume de Berghes
- Other post: Abbot of St Vaast (1577–1598)

Orders
- Consecration: 15 December 1596 by Ottavio Mirto Frangipani

Personal details
- Born: July 20, 1539 Arras, County of Artois, Habsburg Netherlands
- Died: March 3, 1598 (aged 58) Brussels, Duchy of Brabant, Spanish Netherlands
- Buried: Abbey of St. Vaast
- Denomination: Benedictine
- Parents: Antoine Sarazin, craftsman, and Marie de Poix, inn-keeper
- Education: University of Paris, Leuven University
- Motto: Pietate et patientia (From piety and patience)
- Coat of arms

Jean Sarazin (also Sarrasin or Sarrazin), Latinized Joannes Saracenus (1539–1598) was an abbot of the Benedictine Abbey of St. Vaast, Arras, and the third archbishop of Cambrai.

== Life ==
Sarazin was baptized in Arras on 20 July 1539. He was the son of Antoine Sarazin, a craftsman in the wool trade, and Marie de Poix, an inn-keeper. As a choirboy he came to the attention of the parish priest, who ensured he obtained an education. On 29 May 1556 he entered the Abbey of St Vaast. The abbot, impressed with his abilities, sent him for further studies in Paris and Leuven.

From 1575 Sarazin was the delegate of the abbot of St Vaast in the States of the County of Artois, and in that capacity was involved in negotiations relating to the Pacification of Ghent (1576). In 1577 he became abbot himself. An edition of the works of Prosper of Aquitaine, printed in Douai by Joannes Bogardus in 1577, was dedicated to Abbot Sarazin, as was Antonius Meyer's Ursus, sive de rebus Divi Vedasti Episcopi Atrebatensis (Paris, Charles Roger, 1580), and much later Philippe Bosquier's Le Fouet de l'Académie des Pécheurs (Arras, Guillaume de la Rivière, 1597).

Sarazin was active in bringing about the Union of Arras (1579) which was a first step towards reconciling the Walloon provinces of the Habsburg Netherlands to the government of Philip II of Spain. In 1582 he took part in a delegation from the Southern Netherlands to Philip II. A manuscript account of this mission was written by his successor as abbot of St Vaast, Philippe de Caverel, and was published in 1851 as Relation du voyage et de l'ambassade de Jean Sarrazin en Espagne et en Portugal, edited by Louis de Baecker (Bruges, 1851).

On 6 March 1596 Sarazin was appointed to the archbishopric of Cambrai in succession to Louis de Berlaymont, being consecrated in Brussels by the apostolic nuncio on 15 December 1596.

He died in Brussels on 3 March 1598 and was buried in the Abbey of St Vaast.

== Writings ==
A manuscript volume of Sarazin's sermons (1578–1598) survives in the Bibliothèque Municipale Arras.

Catholic Church titles
Preceded by Thomas de Parenty	Abbot of St Vaast; 1577–1598	Succeeded by Philippe de Caverel
Preceded by Louis de Berlaymont	Archbishop of Cambrai; 1596–1598	Succeeded by Guillaume de Berghes
