= Reduzum =

Roordahuizum Reduzum
- Village
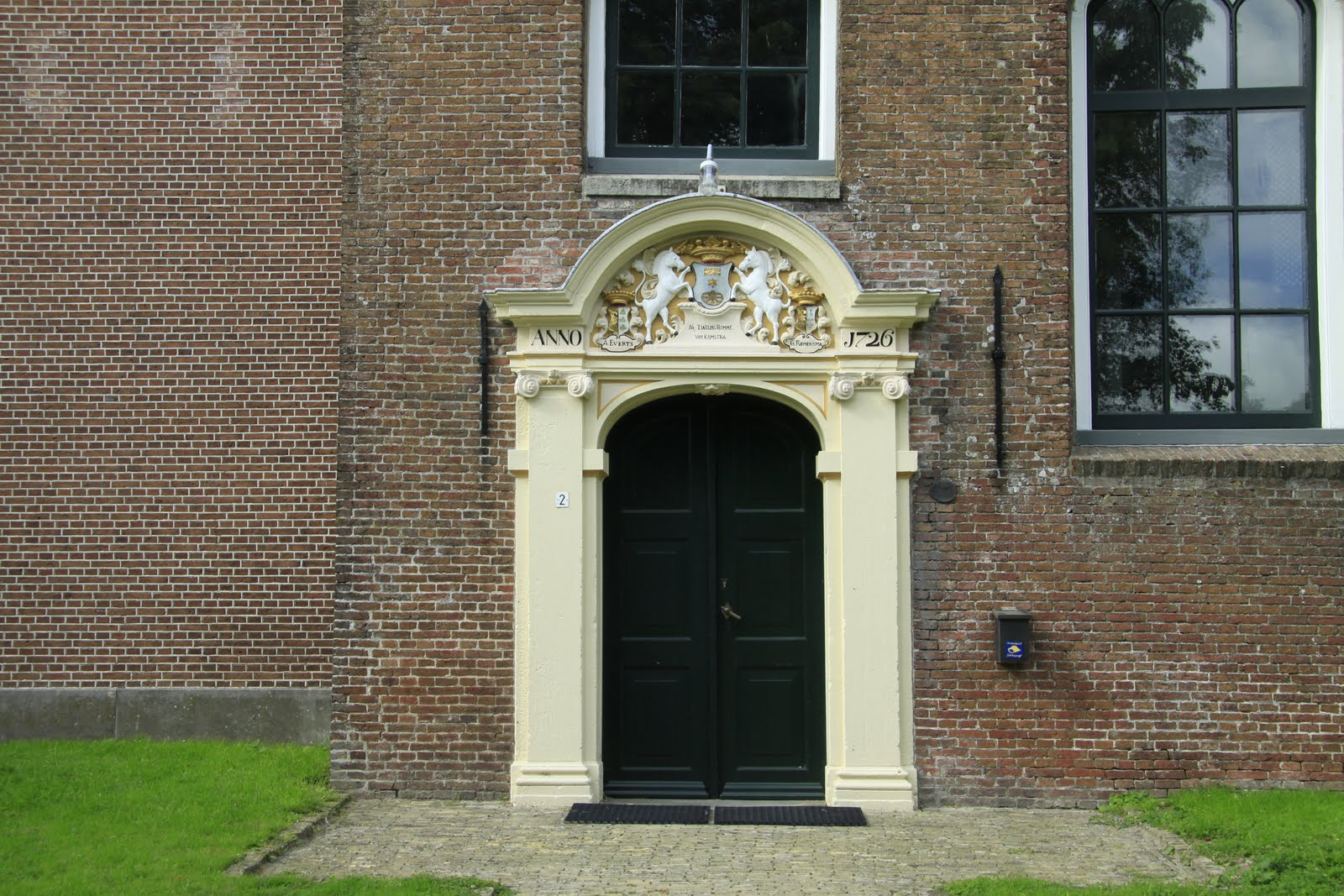
- St Vincent's Church gate

- Flag Coat of arms

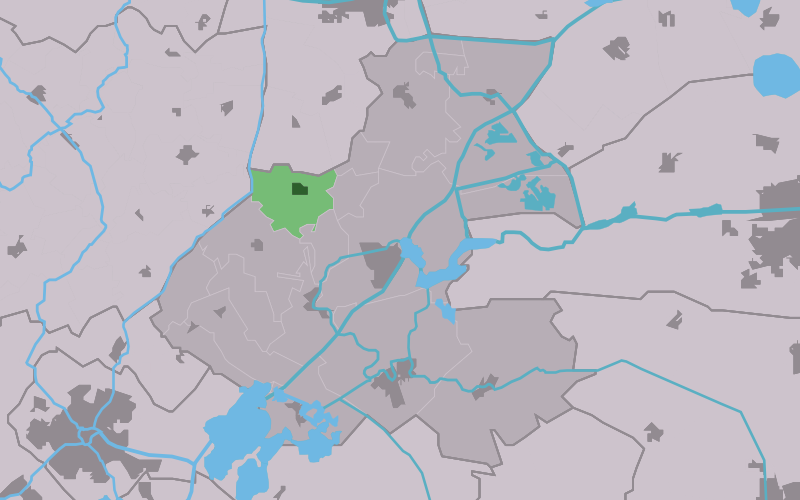
- Location in the former Boarnsterhim municipality

- Location in the Netherlands Roordahuizum (Netherlands)
- Country: Netherlands
- Province: Friesland
- Municipality: Leeuwarden

Area
  - Total: 7.23 km^{2} (2.79 sq mi)
- Elevation: 0.4 m (1.3 ft)

Population (2021)
  - Total: 1,085
  - Density: 150/km^{2} (389/sq mi)
- Time zone: UTC+1 (CET)
  - Summer (DST): UTC+2 (CEST)
- Postal code: 9008
- Dialing code: 0566

Reduzum (Dutch: Roordahuizum) is a village in Leeuwarden municipality in the province of Friesland, the Netherlands. It had a population of around 1,320 in January 2017. The community is notable for working towards sustainable energy consumption within the village.

== History ==
The village was first mentioned in 1389 as Rorthahusum, and either means settlement of the people of Ruerd (person) or settlement belonging to Raerd. Reduzum is a terp (artificial living mound) settlement from the early Middle Ages. The Dutch Reformed church which probably dates from the 15th century was enlarged in 1726 and received its iconic entry gate. The church tower was built in 1878.

In 1840, Reduzum was home to 438 people. During the 19th century, linear development occurred along the main road. In 1890, a dairy factory opened in the village.

Before 2014, Roordahuizum was part of Boarnsterhim municipality and before 1984 it belonged to Idaarderadeel.

== Notable residents ==
- Boëtius Epo

== Gallery ==
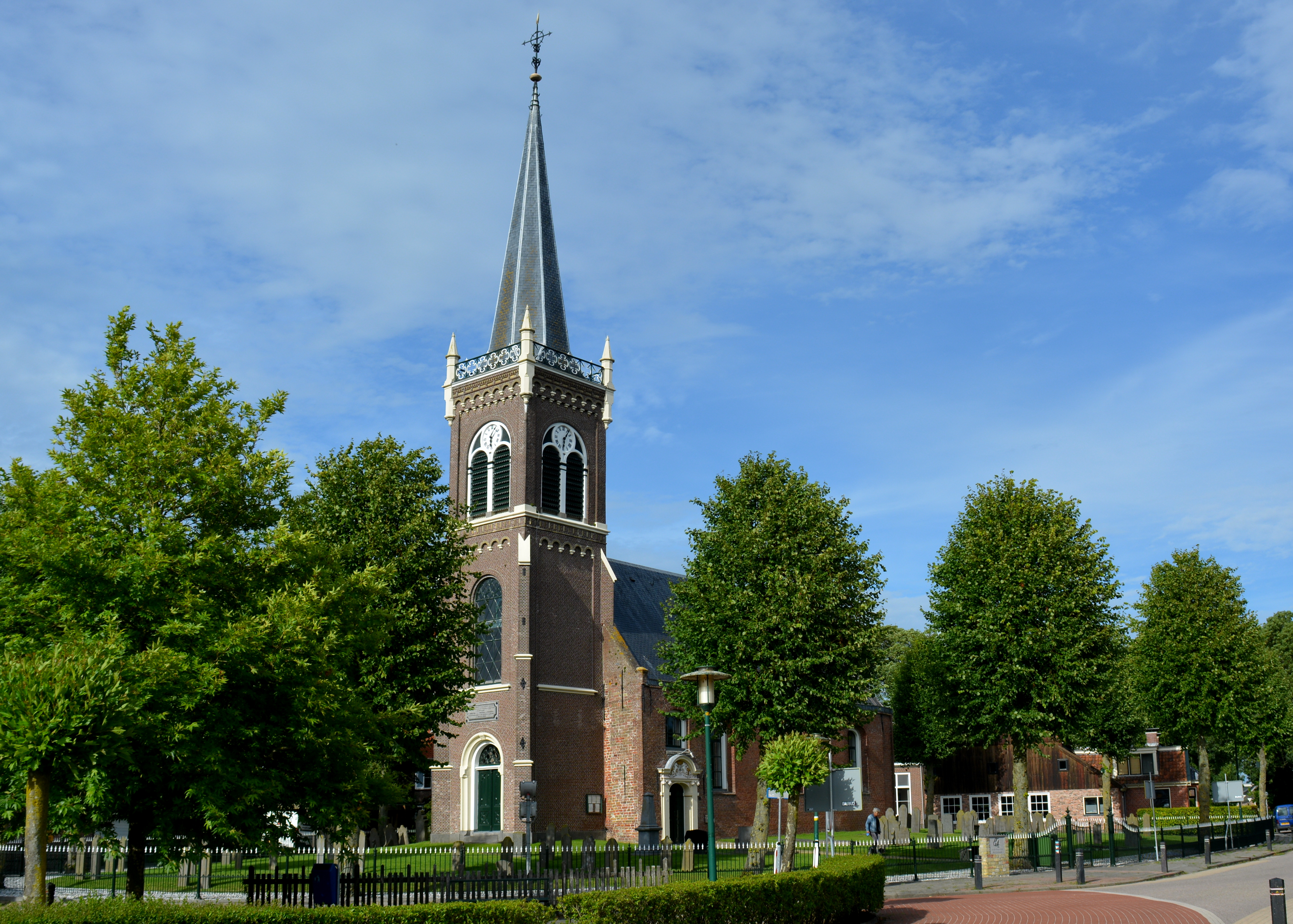
St Vincent Church

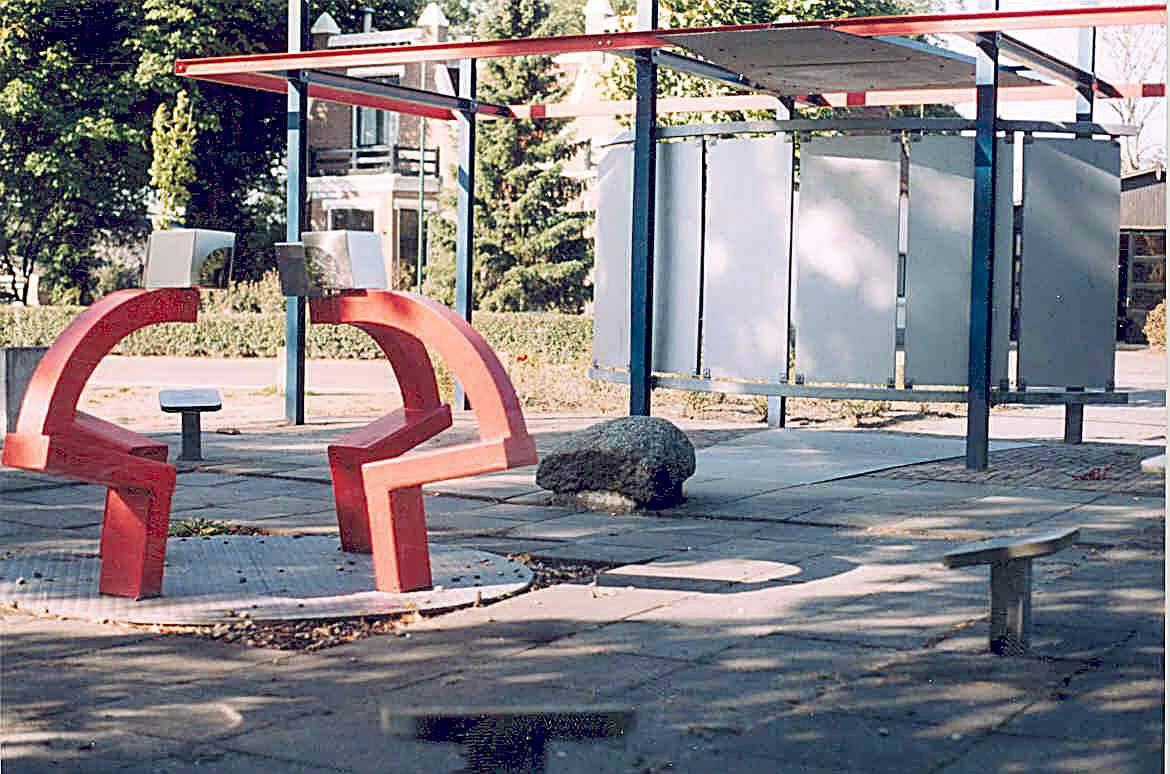
Monument of the breed registry of the Frisian cattle and horses

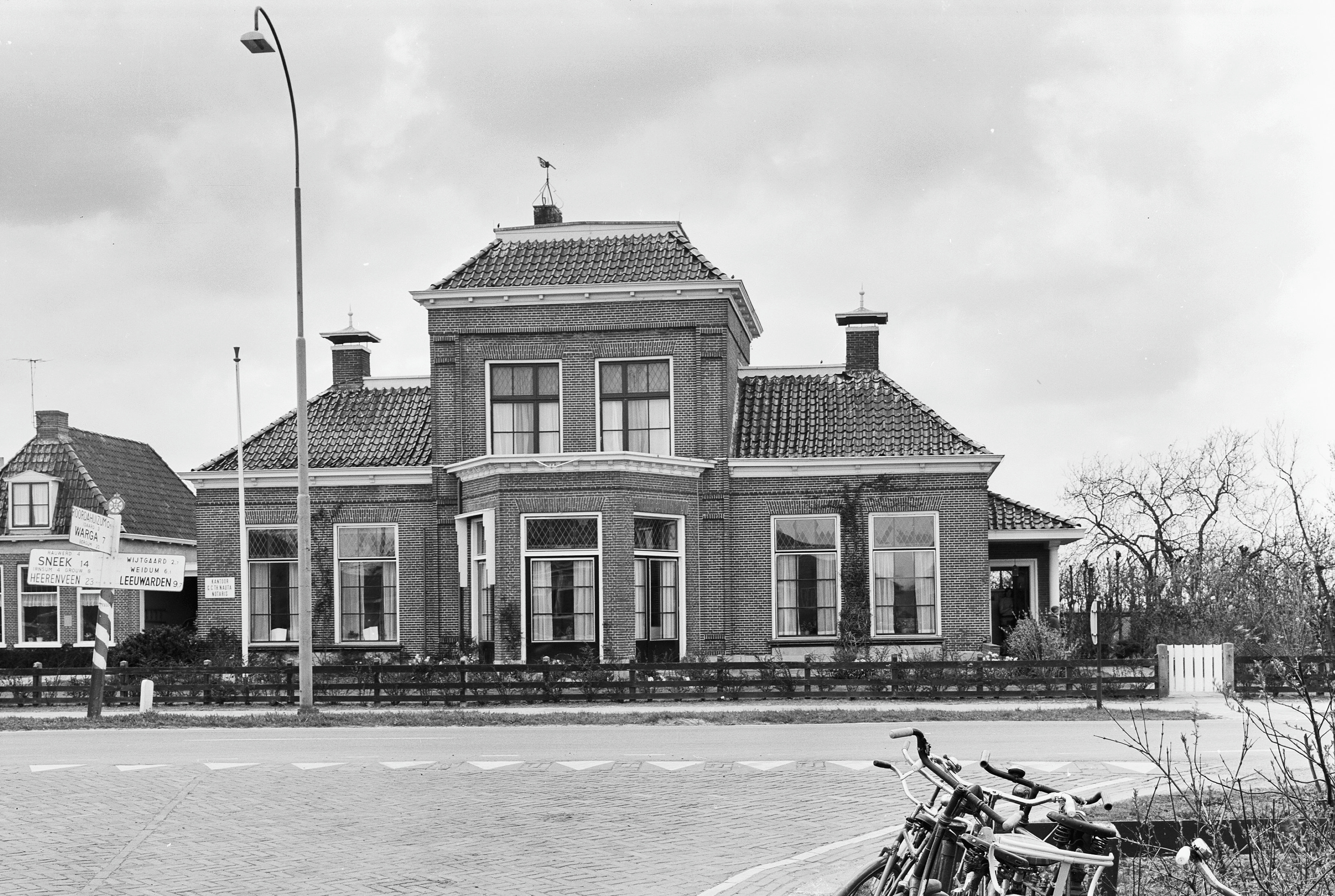
Notary house

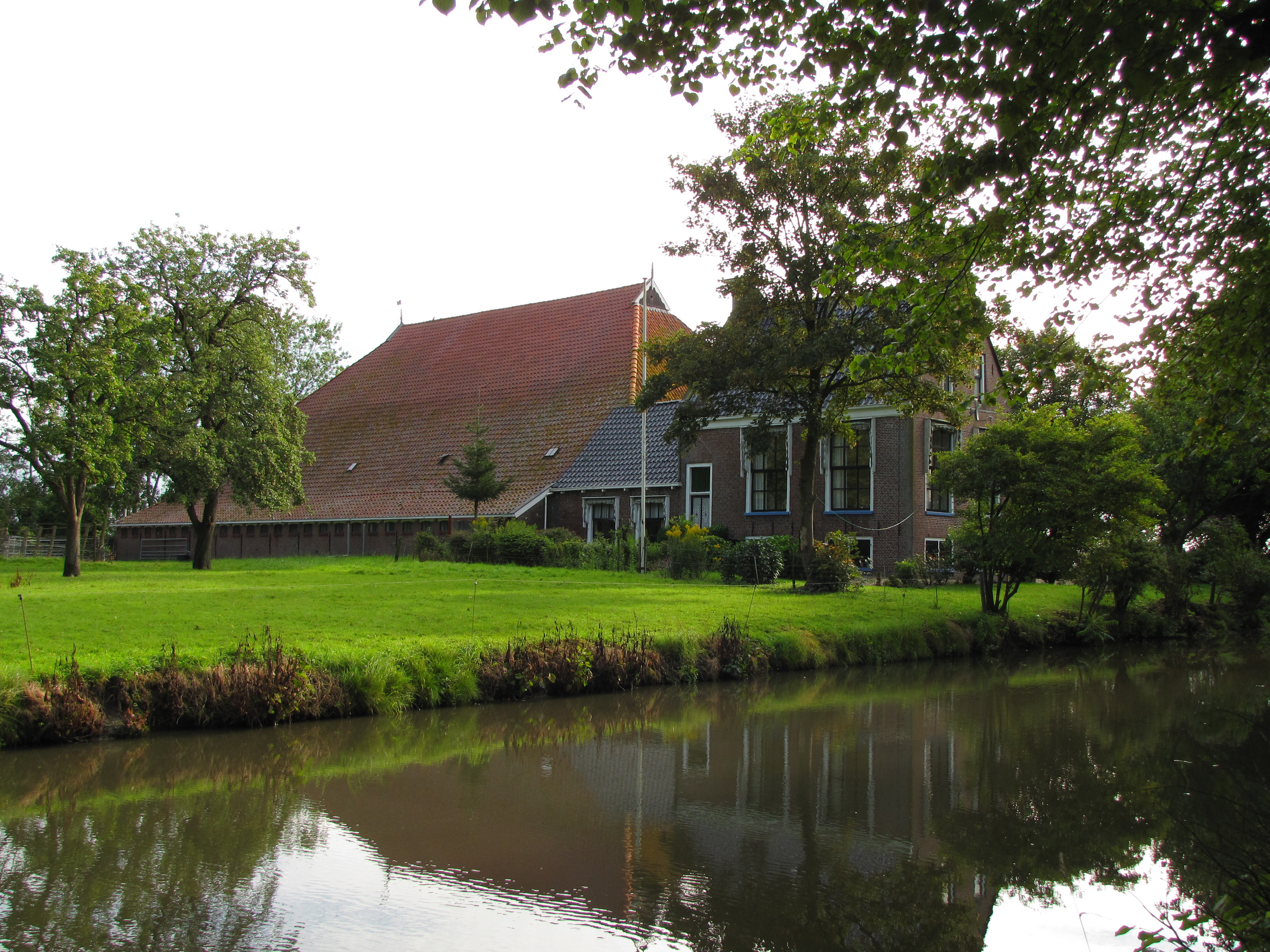
Farm Tjepma State

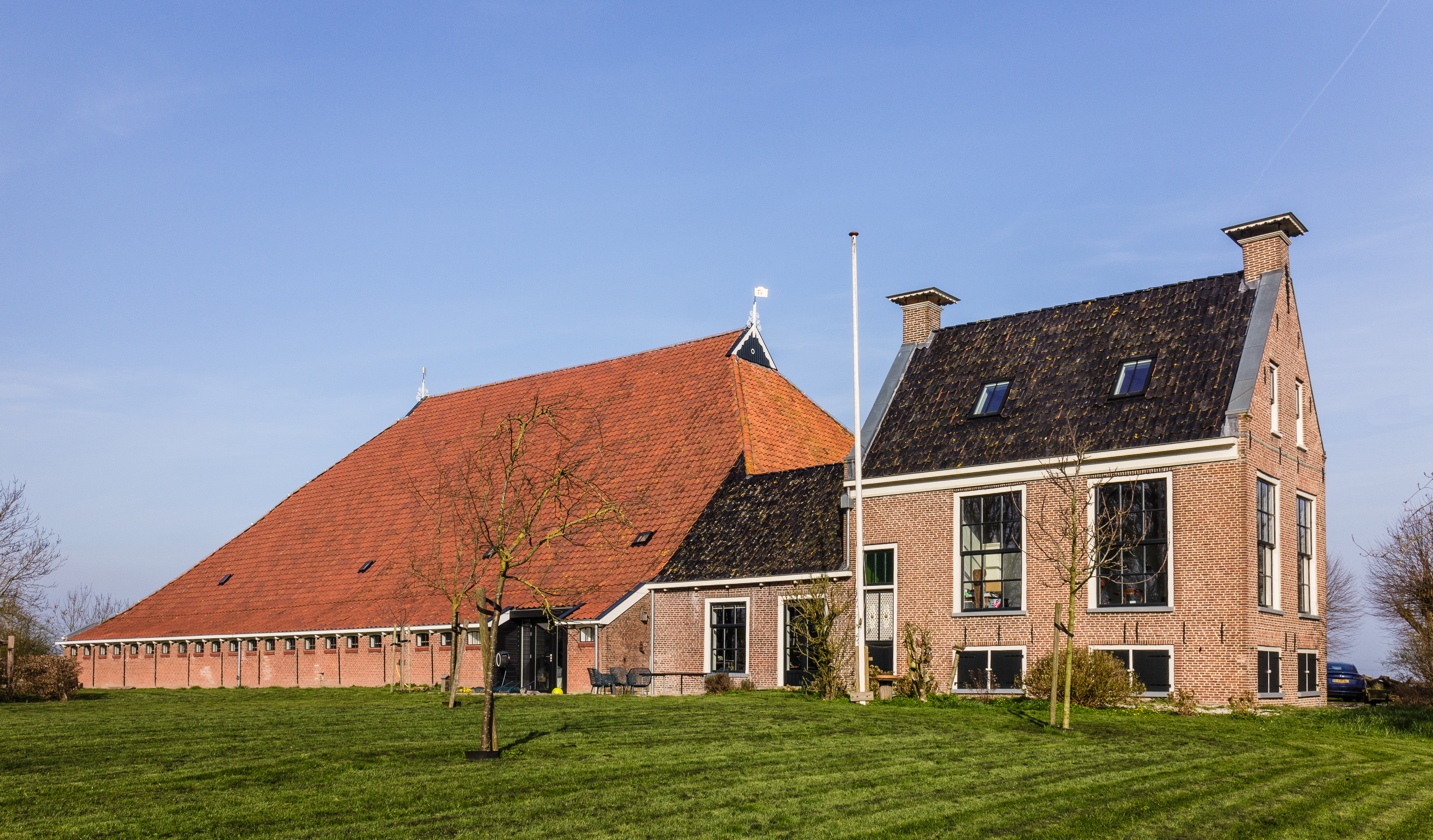
Kop-hals-rompboerderij (Tjepma state)

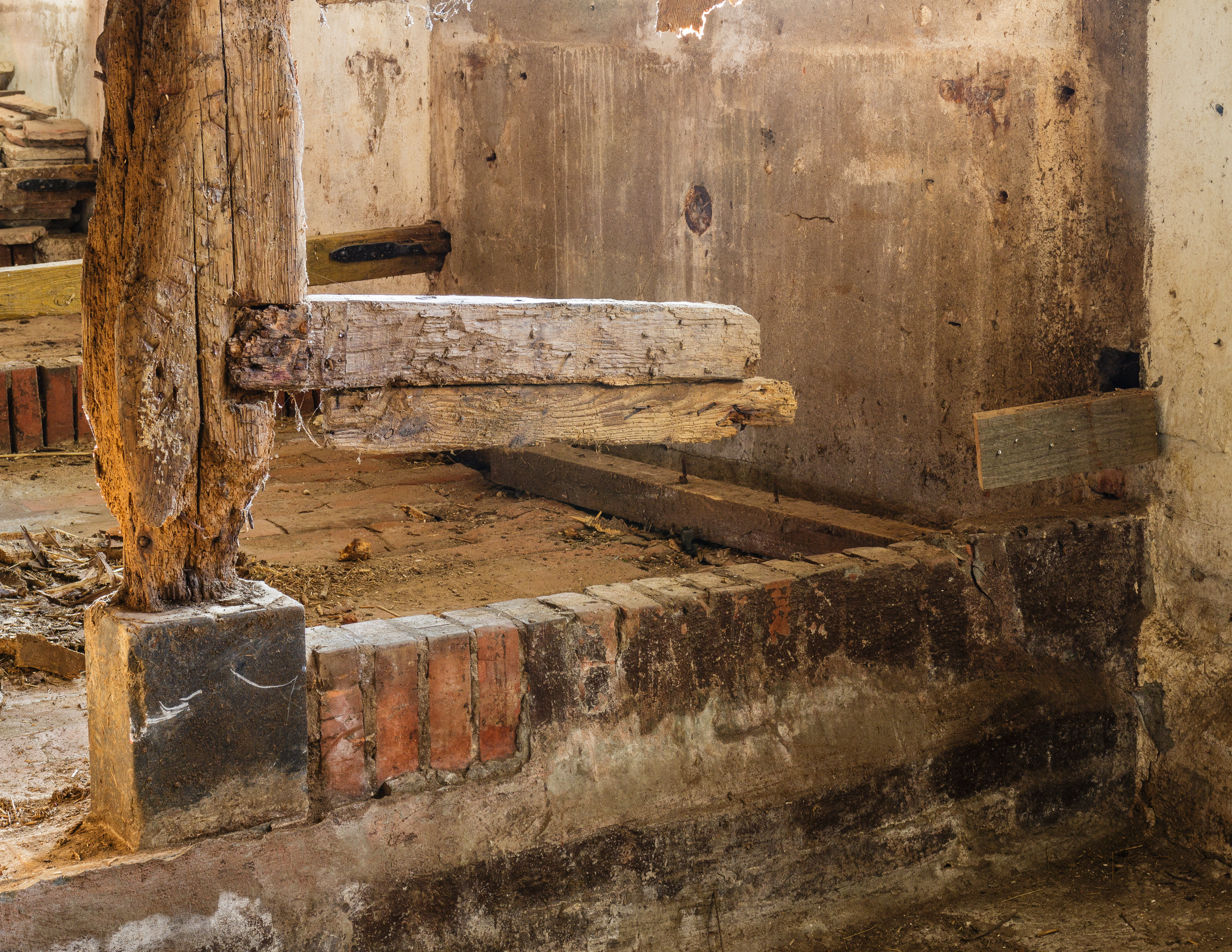
Detail of the interior.
