= Robert de Croÿ =

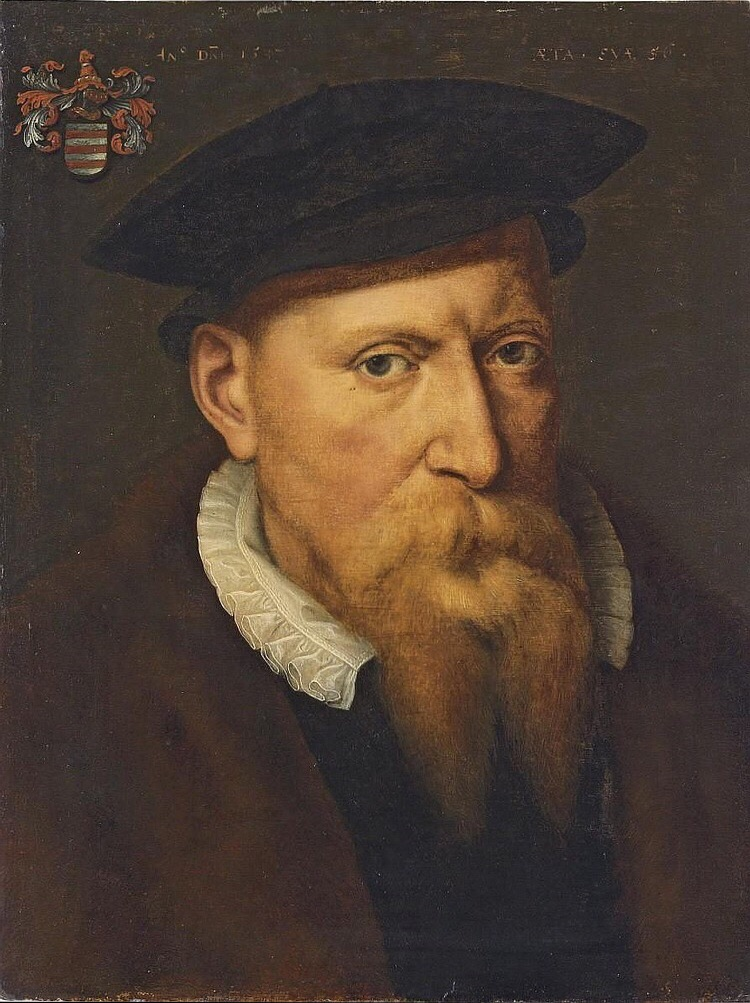
- Portrait of Robert de Croÿ (aged 56) by Willem Key
- Church: Catholic
- Diocese: Diocese of Cambrai
- See: Nôtre Dame Sainte Marie de Cambrai
- Elected: 15 December 1519
- Installed: 5 August 1529
- Predecessor: William de Croÿ
- Successor: Maximilian de Berghes

Personal details
- Born: 1500
- Died: 31 August 1556 Cambrai, Cambrésis, Habsburg Netherlands
- Buried: Old Cambrai Cathedral
- Parents: Henry de Croÿ and Charlotte de Châteaubriant
- Education: Leuven University

Robert de Croÿ (1500–1556) was a Prince-Bishop of Cambrai in the Holy Roman Empire.

== Life ==
Robert was the third son of Henry de Croÿ and Charlotte de Châteaubriant. His uncle, William de Croÿ, Lord of Chièvres, was one of the most trusted councillors of the future Holy Roman Emperor Charles V. When Robert's older brother, William, resigned the see of Cambrai to mollify Castilian opposition to his appointment as an absentee Archbishop of Toledo, dynastic politics led to Robert's election as successor, even though he was not yet of canonical age.

Croÿ was elected on 15 December 1519, but had to complete his education before he could assume his functions. He was tutored by the Spanish humanist Juan Luis Vives, and then studied at Leuven University, partly residing at the castle of his oldest brother, Philippe, in Heverlee. He only made his solemn entry into Cambrai on 13 June 1529, to be installed as bishop on 5 August 1529, the day that the Treaty of Cambrai that ended the war between France and Spain was proclaimed.

From 8 June to 25 August 1546 he personally participated in the deliberations of the Council of Trent. In 1550 he called a synod, at which he published the Augsburg Interim in his diocese. He died in Cambrai on 31 August 1556, and was buried in his cathedral.

Catholic Church titles
Preceded by William de Croÿ	Bishop of Cambrai; 1519–1556	Succeeded by Maximilian de Berghes
