= Philippe de Caverel =

Philippe de Caverel (Philippus Caverellius)
- Abbot of St Vaast
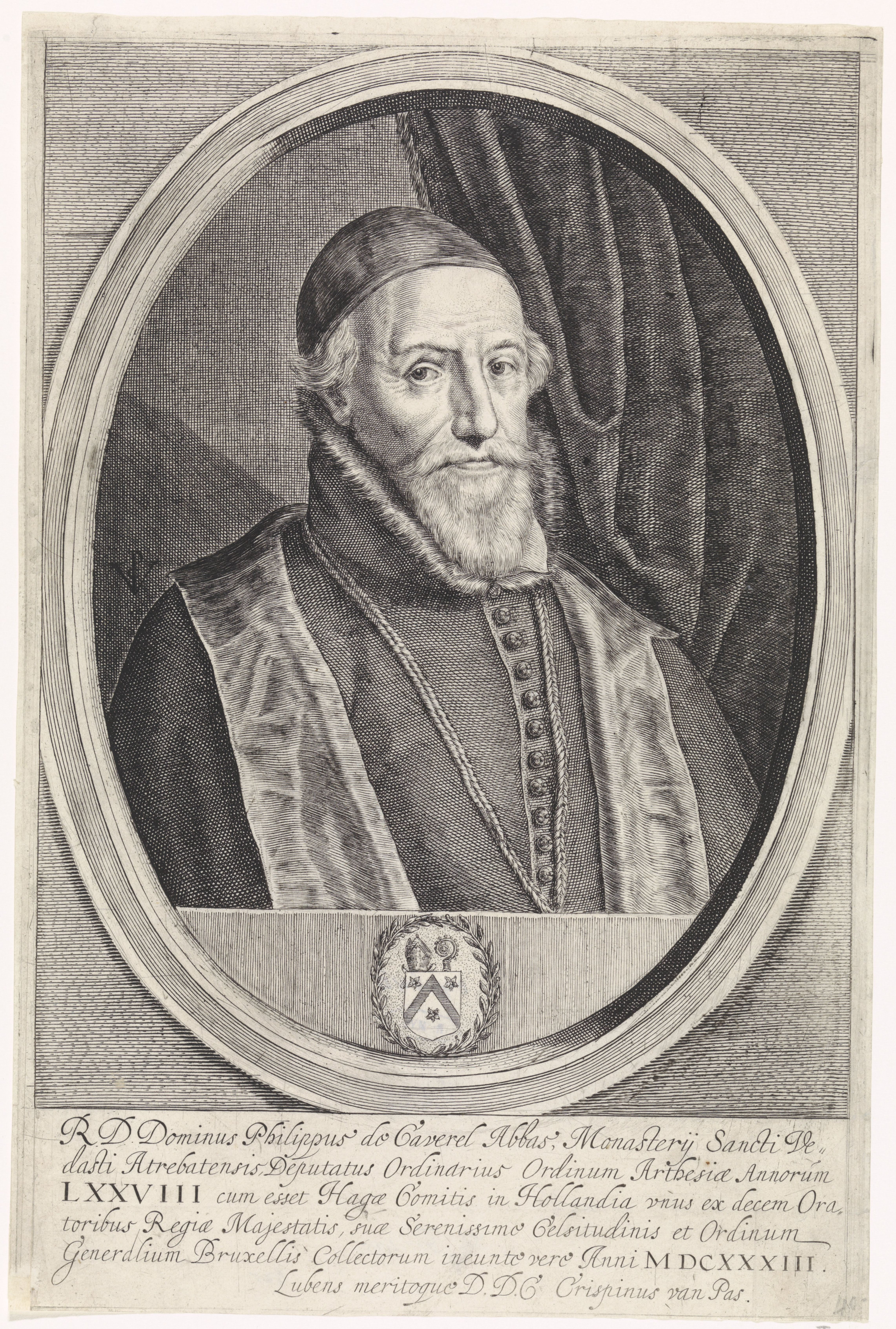
- Appointed: 1598
- Term ended: 1636
- Predecessor: Jean Sarazin
- Successor: Maximilien de Bourgogne

Personal details
- Born: 1555
- Died: 1636 (aged 80–81)
- Denomination: Benedictine

Philippe de Caverel, Latinized as Philippus Caverellius (1555–1636), was an abbot of the Benedictine Abbey of St Vaast, Arras, and a councillor of state to the Archdukes Albert and Isabella. He was founder of Arras College in Paris, of the Jesuit College in Arras, of the College of St Vaast at the University of Douai, and of the English Benedictine monastery in Douai, as well as of a convent in La Bassée. He was also a literary patron of the Baroque period.

Caverel was one of the delegates of the County of Artois to the Estates General of 1632, and one of the members of that body deputized to unsuccessful peace negotiations with the Dutch Republic in The Hague.

His account of a diplomatic mission to Spain and Portugal in 1582 led by his predecessor, Jean Sarazin, survived in manuscript and was published in 1851 as Relation du voyage et de l'ambassade de Jean Sarrazin en Espagne et en Portugal, edited by Louis de Baecker (Bruges, 1851).

== Works dedicated to Caverel ==
- Aubert Miraeus, Origines Benedictinae (Cologne, 1614).
- Guillaume Gazet, Histoire ecclesiastique du Pays-bas (Valenciennes, 1614).
- François-Hyacinthe Choquet, Sancti Belgi Ordinis praedicatorum (Douai, 1618).
- John Pitts, Relationum historicarum de rebus anglicis Tomus Primus (Paris, 1619).
- Aubert Miraeus, Originum monasticarum libri IV (Cologne, 1620).

== Sources ==
- Hugues Du Tems, Le clergé de France, vol. 4 (Paris, 1775), p. 151.
