= Maximilian de Berghes =

- Church: Catholic
- Archdiocese: Archdiocese of Cambrai
- See: Nôtre Dame Sainte Marie de Cambrai
- Elected: 10 September 1556
- Predecessor: Robert de Croÿ
- Successor: Louis de Berlaymont

Personal details
- Born: c. 1512
- Died: August 27, 1570 Bergen op Zoom, Duchy of Brabant, Habsburg Netherlands
- Buried: Old Cambrai Cathedral
- Parents: Dismas de Berghes

Maximilian de Berghes (c. 1512–1570) was the first archbishop of Cambrai.

== Life ==
Maximilian was born around 1512, the second son of privy councillor Dismas de Berghes, a recognised bastard of John II of Glymes, Lord of Bergen op Zoom. Embarking on a clerical career, he became Dean of the Church of Saint Gummarus in Lier (Duchy of Brabant). He was elected bishop of Cambrai on 10 September 1556, thanks to the influence of Cardinal Granvelle, but Pope Paul IV refused to confirm his election until 1559. Berghes took formal possession of his see on 21 October that year. In the intervening time, the papal bull of 12 May 1559 establishing the new bishoprics in the Low Countries had made Cambrai an archdiocese, with Tournai, Arras, Saint-Omer and Namur as suffragan sees. On 6 January 1560 this was confirmed by Pope Pius IV, despite the protests of Charles, Cardinal of Lorraine, archbishop of Reims, to whom Cambrai, Tournai, Arras and Saint-Omer had previously been subject (Namur had been part of the diocese of Liège). Maximilian was installed as archbishop on 22 March 1562.

In 1565 he summoned a provincial council to promulgate the decrees of the Council of Trent in his archdiocese, which sat from 24 June to 15 July, followed by a diocesan synod in October 1567. In 1566 he took part in the Diet of Augsburg, where the Catholic princes of the Holy Roman Empire accepted the decrees.

On 27 August 1570, while accompanying Anna of Austria on her journey to Spain to marry Philip II, he died suddenly at Bergen op Zoom. His remains were transferred to Cambrai and buried in the cathedral on 29 October.

Catholic Church titles
Preceded by Robert de Croÿ	Bishop of Cambrai; 1559–1562	Succeeded by last
Preceded by first	Archbishop of Cambrai; 1562–1570	Succeeded by Louis de Berlaymont
