= Baldric of Noyon =

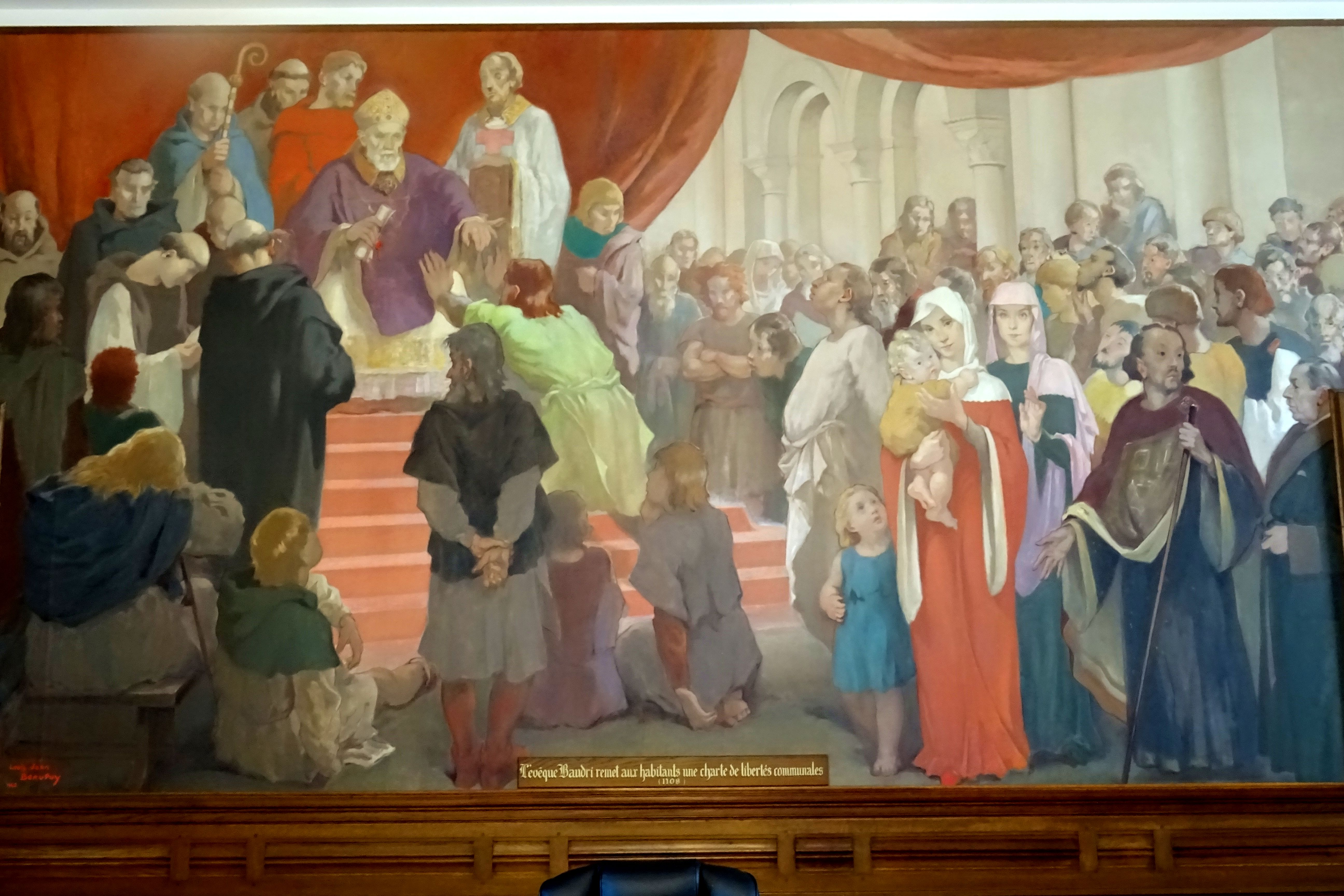
Baldric giving a charter of liberties to the citizens of Noyon in 1108. Painting by Louis-Jean Beaupuy between 1942 and 1945.

Baldric or Balderic (Note: His name in French may be spelled Baldéric, Baudri or Baudry. In Latin it is Baldericus.) was the forty-second bishop of Tournai and Noyon (1099–1112). He was born in Artois and was a canon and cantor in the dioceses of Cambrai and Thérouanne prior to becoming bishop.

The Deeds of the Bishops of Cambrai has mistakenly been attributed to him. His surviving acta include the charter of 1105 by which he awarded the right of presentment for Tielt to the chapter of St Salvator in Harelbeke.
