= Franciscus van der Burch =

- Archbishop-Duke of Cambrai
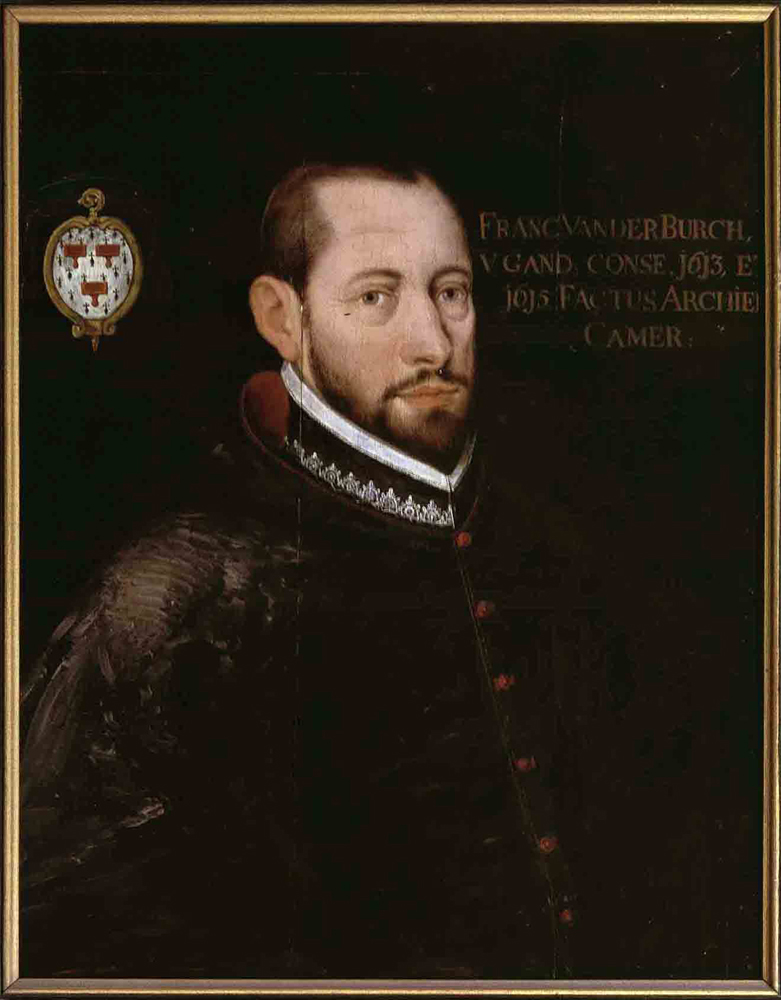
- Portrait from Ghent Cathedral
- Diocese: Cambrai
- See: Notre Dame de Cambrai
- Installed: 12 May 1616
- Term ended: 23 May 1644
- Predecessor: François Buisseret
- Successor: Joseph de Bergaigne
- Other post: Bishop of Ghent (1612-1616)

Orders
- Consecration: 17 February 1613

Personal details
- Born: 26 July 1567 Ghent, County of Flanders, Habsburg Netherlands
- Died: 23 May 1644 (aged 76) Mons, County of Hainaut, Habsburg Netherlands
- Education: Leuven University
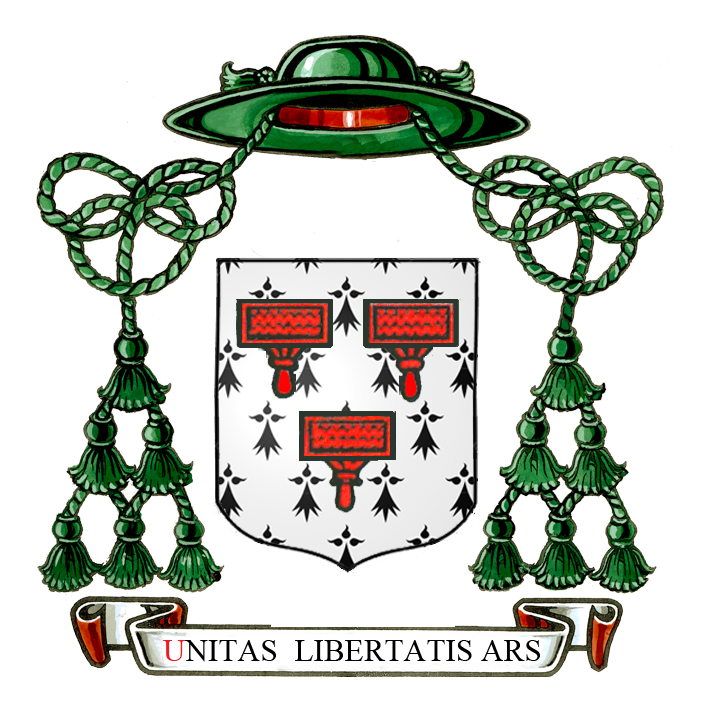
- Coat of arms

Franciscus van der Burch (1567–1644) was a bishop of Ghent and archbishop of Cambrai.

== Life ==
Franciscus was born in Ghent on 26 July 1567, the son of Jan van der Burch, a member of the Council of Flanders, and Camille Marguerite Diacetto, a native of Florence. His father would go on to become president of the Great Council of Mechelen in 1584 and of the Privy Council of the Habsburg Netherlands in 1592.

Franciscus was educated partly in Utrecht, where his uncle Lambert van der Burch was dean of the chapter of St. Mary's Church, and partly at the Jesuit college in Douai, before going on to study at Leuven University, where he graduated Licentiate of Laws.

He became a clergyman and was appointed a canon of Arras Cathedral, vicar general of the diocese of Arras, and archdeacon of the archdiocese of Mechelen. He resigned these offices to become a simple canon of the collegiate church in Mons.

In 1612 he accepted nomination as bishop of Ghent, receiving papal confirmation on 1 October 1612 and being consecrated bishop in Ghent Cathedral on 17 February 1613. On 12 May 1616 he was instituted as archbishop of Cambrai, in succession to François Buisseret who had died in 1615. As archbishop he established a number of charitable foundations. The most important of these was the Maison de Sainte-Agnès, or Fondation Vanderburch, established in 1626, which provided vocational education for poor girls between the ages of 12 and 18.

He died in Mons on 23 May 1644. Two streets in Cambrai were named after him.

Catholic Church titles
Preceded by Charles Maes	Bishop of Ghent; 1612–1616	Succeeded by Jacobus Boonen
Preceded by François Buisseret	Archbishop of Cambrai; 1616–1644	Succeeded by Joseph de Bergaigne
