= Honoré Fisquet =

Honoré Jean Pierre Fisquet (1818–1883) was a French historian, biographer and writer of guide books, including a Nouveau guide général du voyageur en Angleterre, en Écosse et en Irlande (1864), which he wrote together with Henri-Marie Martin and published under the pseudonym William Darcy. He was born in Montpellier on 16 June 1818 and died in Paris on 27 July 1883.

== Publications ==
He was best known for his 22-volume biographical overview of French bishops, La France pontificale (Gallia Christiana), published in large part by Étienne Repos in 1864–1872. His other works include:

- Ode à la France sur le retour des cendres de Napoléon (1840)
- Histoire de l'Algérie depuis les temps anciens jusqu'à nos jours (1842)
- Un premier amour (1845)
- La Nouvelle Marseillaise (1848)
- Biographie des membres du Gouvernement provisoire (1848)
- Guide du visiteur: Histoire archéologique et descriptive des églises de Paris (1855)
- Notice sur le P. Jérôme Natalis (1856)
- Notice biographique sur monseigneur Marie-Gaston de Bonnechose, Cardinal-archevêque de Rouen (1865)
- Notice biographique sur monseigneur Sébastien Adolphe Devoucoux, évêque d'Evreux (1865)
- Notice biographique sur son éminence Thomas Gousset, cardinal archevêque de Reims (1865)
- Les pères du Concile, biographies, portraits et autographes des pères du concile premier du Vatican (1871)
- Cérémonies pontificales: Histoire liturgique et descriptive des chapelles papales tenues pendant l'année dans les diverses églises de Rome (1871)
- Biographie de monseigneur Georges Darboy, archevêque de Paris (1871)
- Rome et l'épiscopat catholique (1874)
- La France départementale, histoire générale de toutes les communes (1875)
- Grand atlas départemental de la France, de l'Algérie et des colonies (1878)
- Dictionnaire des célébrités de France classées par ordre alphabétique et par départements (1878)
- Histoire archéologique et descriptive de Notre-Dame de Paris (undated)
