= List of bishops and archbishops of Cambrai =

This is a List of bishops and archbishops of Cambrai, that is, of the Roman Catholic Archdiocese of Cambrai.

== Bishops ==
For the first bishops of Arras and Cambrai, who resided at the former place, see Roman Catholic Diocese of Arras. On the death of Saint Vedulphus (545–580) the episcopal residence was transferred from Arras to Cambrai. Among his successors were:

- Gaugericus (584–623)
- Berthoald (627)
- Emebert (d. 710)
- Autbert (633–669)
- Vindicianus (669–693)
- Hildebert
- Hunald
- Hadulf (d. 728)
- Treuvard
- Gunfrid
- Alberic
- Hildoard (790–816)
- Halitgar (817–831)
- Theoderic I
- Hilduin
- John I (866–879)
- Rothad (879–886)
- Odilo
- Stephen
- Fulbert (934–956)
- Berengar
- Ingelran
- Ansbert
- Wiboldus (965–966)
- Tetdo
- Rothard
- Erluin (995–1012), first prince-bishop as count of the Cambrésis
- Gerard I (1013–1051)
- Lietbertus (1057–1076)
- Gerard II (1076–1092)
- Walcher (1093–1095)
- Manasses (1095–1103)
- Odo of Tournai (1105–1113)
- Burchard (1115–1131)
- Lietard (1131–1134)
- Nicolas I de Chièvres (1137–1167)
- Peter I of Flanders (1167–1173), never consecrated
- Robert I d'Aire (1173–1174), never consecrated
- Alard (1175–1178), never consecrated
- Roger de Wavrin (1179–1191)
- Jean II d'Antoing (1192–1196), nephew of Roger de Wavrin
- Nicolas II de Rœulx (1197)
- Hugues d'Oisy (1197–1198), never consecrated
- Peter II of Corbeil (1199–1200)
- John of Béthune (1200–1219)
- Godefroid de Fontaines (1220–1237/1238)
- Guy I de Laon (1238–1248)
- Nicolas III de Fontaine
- Enguerrand de Créqui (1274–1286)
- Guillaume I d'Avesnes (1286–1296),
- Guy II de Colmieu (1296–1306)
- Philippe de Marigny (1306–1309)
- Pierre de Lévis-Mirepoix (1309–1324)
- Guy III de Boulogne (1324–1336)
- Guillaume II d'Auxonne (1336–1342)
- Guy IV de Ventadour (1342–1349)
- Pierre d'André (1348–1368)
- Robert II of Geneva (1368–1371)
- Gerard III (1371–1378), previously bishop of Arras and Thérouanne
  - Jean t'Serclaes (1378–1389) (appointed by Clement VII of the Avignon Obedience)
- André de Luxembourg (1390–1396)
  - Pierre d'Ailly (1396–1411) (appointed by Benedict XIII of the Avignon Obedience)
- Jean de Gavre (1411–1439)
- John of Burgundy (1439–1479)
- Henri de Bergues (1480–1502)
- Jacques de Croÿ (1503–1516), son of Jean II de Croÿ
- Guillaume III de Croÿ, cardinal in 1517, apostolic administrator of Toledo in 1517 (1516–1519)
- Robert de Croÿ (1519–1556)
- Maximilian de Berghes (1556–1562)

== Archbishops ==
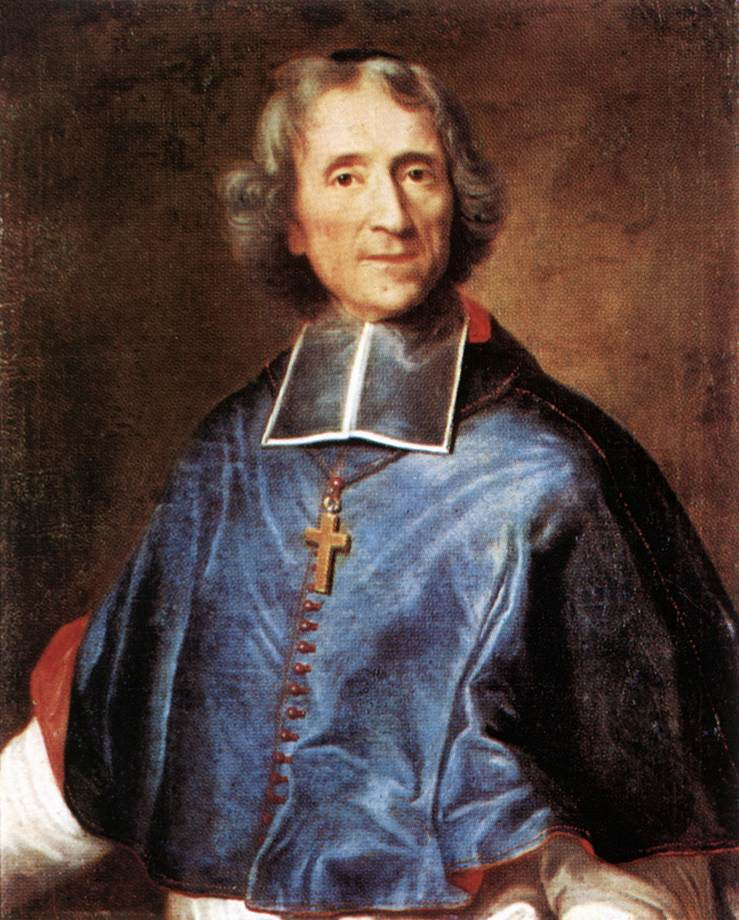
Fénelon was archbishop of Cambrai from 1695 to 1715.

- Maximilian de Berghes (1562–1570)
- Louis de Berlaymont (1570–1596)
- Jean Sarazin (1596–1598)
- Guillaume de Berghes (1601–1609)
- Jean Richardot (1609–1614), minister and diplomat of the Archdukes Albert and Isabella.
- François Buisseret (1614–1615)
- Franciscus van der Burch (1616–1644)
- Joseph de Bergaigne (1644–1647)
- Gaspard Nemius (1649–1667)
- Ladislas Jonart (1667–1674)
- Jacques-Théodore de Bryas (1675–1694)
- François de Salignac de La Mothe-Fénelon, theologian and writer, proponent of Quietism (1695–1715).
- Jean d' Estrées (1716–1718)
- Cardinal Joseph de la Tremoille (1718–1720).
- Cardinal Guillaume Dubois (1720–1723), minister to Louis XV.
- Charles de Saint-Albin (1723–1764) (illegitimate son of Philippe d' Orleans, Regent of France)
- Leopold-Charles de Choiseul-Stainville (1764–1774) (His brother, Étienne-François, was Foreign Minister)
- Henri-Marie-Bernardin de Ceilhes de Rosset de Fleury (1774–1781)
- Ferdinand Maximilien Mériadec de Rohan (1781–1801).
- Louis de Belmas (30 April 1802 – 21 July 1841)
- Pierre Giraud (24 January 1842 – 17 April 1850)
- René-François Régnier (30 September 1850 – 3 January 1881)
- Alfred Duquesnay (1881–1884).
- François-Edouard Hasley (27 March 1885 – 7 August 1888)
- Odon Thibaudier (14 February 1889 – 9 January 1892)
- Etienne-Marie-Alphonse Sonnois (19 January 1893 – 7 February 1913)
- François-Marie-Joseph Delamaire (7 February 1913 – 21 July 1913)
- Jean-Arthur Chollet (21 November 1913 – 2 December 1952)
- Emile Maurice Guerry (2 December 1952 – 15 February 1966 Retired)
- Henri-Martin-Félix Jenny (15 February 1966 – 25 March 1980 Retired)
- Jacques Louis Léon Delaporte (25 March 1980 – 21 November 1999)
- François Garnier (7 December 2000 – 15 August 2018)
- Vincent Dollmann (15 August 2018 –)

== Bibliography ==
=== Reference works ===
- Eubel, Conradus, ed. (1913). Hierarchia catholica, Tomus 1 (second ed.). Münster: Libreria Regensbergiana. p. 160. (in Latin)
- Eubel, Conradus, ed. (1914). Hierarchia catholica, Tomus 2 (second ed.). Münster: Libreria Regensbergiana. pp. 115–116.
- Eubel, Conradus; Gulik, Guilelmus, eds. (1923). Hierarchia catholica, Tomus 3 (second ed.). Münster: Libreria Regensbergiana. p. 100.
- Ritzler, Remigius; Sefrin, Pirminus (1952). Hierarchia catholica medii et recentis aevi V (1667–1730). Patavii: Messagero di S. Antonio. p. 139.

=== Studies ===
- Fisquet, Honore (1864). La France pontificale (Gallia Christiana): Cambrai (in French). Paris: Etienne Repos.
