= Étienne Repos =

Jean-Baptiste Étienne Repos (1803–1872) was a French publisher who specialised in works on liturgy, religion and history.

The son of a bookbinder from Avignon, Repos was licensed as a printer in Digne on 27 December 1837. He published a number of periodicals, some quite short-lived, including Journal de la Société d'agriculture des Basses-Alpes (1838–1849), Le Bas-Alpin (1838) and Le Glaneur des Alpes (1847–1849).

Between 1852 and 1856 Repos published Jean-Joseph-Maxime Feraud's revised plainchant service books. In 1857 he set up shop in Paris as a liturgical publisher and bookseller, selling his printing equipment in Digne to Augustin-André Vial, who shipped it to Algeria. He published Le Plain-chant (1860) and Revue de musique sacrée ancienne et moderne (1861–1870), as well as a series of decrees of the Sacred Congregations. From 1864 until the end of his life he published Honoré Fisquet's La France pontificale (Gallia Christiana) which gave a systematic biographical overview, by ecclesiastical province, of all the French bishops and archbishops.

He died in Paris in July 1872.
