= Deeds of the Bishops of Cambrai =

11th-century Latin books

The Deeds of the Bishops of Cambrai (Latin: Gesta episcoporum Cameracensium) is an anonymous Latin history of the diocese of Cambrai. It was commissioned around 1024 by Bishop Gerard I of Cambrai and completed shortly after his death in 1051. It is the work of two authors.

== Context of production ==
In the period when the Deeds was produced, the city of Cambrai and most of the diocese of Cambrai lay within the Duchy of Lower Lotharingia, in the Kingdom of Germany in the Holy Roman Empire. (The Deeds itself frequently identifies its region as the regnum Lotharii, 'kingdom of Lothair', a reference to the kingdom of Lothair II in the 9th century.) Part of the diocese, including the cities of Arras and Douai, however, lay within the County of Flanders in the Kingdom of France. Spiritually, the bishops were under the jurisdiction of the archbishop of Reims, whose ecclesiastical province was otherwise entirely within France.

By the time of Gerard I, the bishop of Cambrai also exercised temporal power in the county (pagus) of the Cambrésis. Their temporal jurisdiction was much smaller geographically than their spiritual. King Otto I first granted comital jurisdiction in the city of Cambrai to Bishop Fulbert in 948. King Henry II extended the bishop's authority over the whole Cambrésis in 1007, during the tenure of Erluin, Gerard's predecessor. Gerard was thus the first bishop of Cambrai to exercise both secular and spiritual power over the county and diocese, respectively, throughout his episcopate.

== Structure and purpose ==
The Deeds is divided into three books. This was the original plan, since at the end of the first book it states that the pontificate of Gerard I "will be discussed in book three" and the preface to the second book says: "The second book ought to begin with this same lord bishop, as the order of affairs appears to demand. However, we are leaving him to the side for the moment..." The first book is a history of the bishops from the later Roman Empire down to the death of Erluin in 1012. The second book recounts the histories of all the religious foundations under the bishop's authority. It also includes a description of the lands belonging to Cambrai Cathedral. The third covers the pontificate of Gerard and incorporates eight letters from Gerard, two agreements he made with his castellans and his treatise on the three orders. The first book has 122 chapters, the second 48 and the third 60.

It is generally accepted that the Deeds was written to augment the reputation and authority of Bishop Gerard. Robert Stein argues that it had a political and ideological purpose: to show the superiority of government by one possessing both spiritual and temporal authority, i.e., a prince bishop. Laurent Jégou argues that it was written to enhance Gerard's spiritual authority to compensate for his temporal weakness. Georges Duby likewise sees it as designed to enhance the bishop's prestige after the death of his protector, Emperor Henry II, in 1024. Theo Riches argues that the intended audience of the Deeds was essentially local, and that its text could have been used in the future as an archive to buttress Cambrai's property claims. According to its English translators, the Deeds is also a royalist text, emphasising the right of the king to invest bishops and abbots and the royal authority over the use of military force.

== Manuscripts and editions ==
The autograph manuscript of the Deeds, known as the Codex Sancti Gisleni, survives in The Hague (MS Den Haag KB 75 F15). It is incomplete. The last part, from the middle of chapter 49 onwards, had been separated from it and lost sometime in the 14th century.

There are five manuscript copies of the Deeds representing three recensions. The oldest surviving copy, dating from the 14th century, is in Paris (BnF, Lat. 5553a). It is a complete copy made from the autograph before it lost its final eleven and a half chapters. A separate tradition derives from the now lost 12th-century Codex Sanctae Mariae Atrebatensis, which contained a complete copy of the autograph. The earliest copy of the Codex was made in the Abbey of Saint-Vaast in 1482 and is now in the municipal library of Arras (Médiathèque 666). It was itself copied in 1591 by François de Bar, whose copy is now in Brussels (KBR 7747). Both of these copies are riddled with errors. There is also a late 16th-century copy of the Codex in Paris (BnF, Lat. 12827). A further 16th-century copy in Brussels (KBR 7675–82) represents a third manuscript tradition, but is missing chapters 52 and 60 of the third book, Gerard's sermon on Peace of God movement and his letter to the Emperor Henry III, respectively.

The first printed edition of the Deeds was made by Georgius Colvenerius in 1615. Because he made use of the now lost Codex, his edition has been used as a basis for two subsequent editions. The first of these, by André-Joseph-Ghislain Le Glay in 1834, omits several chapters in the second and third books. The second and most recent, by Ludwig Konrad Bethmann for the Monumenta Germaniae Historica in 1846, is the basis for the modern English translation published in 2018.

== Dating and authorship ==
The Deeds was originally commissioned by Bishop Gerard I. A codicological and critical look at the autograph shows that the text was the work of two authors. The first author wrote almost all of the first two books and the third book down to the death of the Emperor Henry II. He had completed the first two books by September 1025 and the rest of his writing probably not long after, certainly not much later than 1030. The first author was probably a canon of Cambrai Cathedral. He was also the author of a biography of Saint Gaugericus, completed in 1024 and likewise commissioned by the bishop. His Latinity is good and writing style straightforward, although he had a penchant for neologisms. He coined at least twelve.

The second author, working in the early 1050s after the death of Gerard I in 1051, emended the existing text and brought the third book down to the death of Gerard. His emendations take the form of erasure and overwriting, marginal notes and additions on separate pieces of parchment sewn into the manuscript. The second author was also a canon of the cathedral. He was probably the author of a biography of Gerard's successor, Lietbert (died 1076), which bears many stylistic similarities with the last ten chapters of the third book of the Deeds.

The Deeds was once falsely attributed to Balderic of Thérouanne (died 1112).

== Sources and methods ==
The History of the Church of Reims by Flodoard stood as a model for the Deeds. Other literary texts which the authors can be shown to have used include Julius Caesar's De bello Gallico, Cicero's De inventione, Gregory of Tours's Decem libri historiarum and possibly Pseudo-Hegesippus' Latin translation of Josephus' Jewish Wars. Documentary sources include royal and private charters kept in the cathedral and in other churches of the diocese. Occasionally such documents are quoted at length in the Deeds. In the preface, the first and primary author describes his method of information gathering, which included interviewing witnesses:

At the command of our lord bishop Gerard, we have committed to memory, to the extent that we have been able to track it down verifiably, information about the history of our cities, namely Cambrai and Arras, as well as about their shepherds.

there is nothing here other than what we have found in annals, or the histories of the fathers, or in the deeds of kings, or in the documents that were in the archive of this church, or what we have learned from certain witnesses through what they saw or heard. Otherwise, it is better to remain silent rather than to pass along false information.

The conception of history held by the authors of the Deeds is derived from Isidore of Seville's Etymologies, which holds history to be the truth about the past and incompatible with fiction or speculation. The first author of the Deeds is explicit that "it therefore is better to remain silent ... than to concoct a fable." That this is a conscious decision is clear from the author's knowledge of Cicero's De inventione and probable familiarity with a competing contemporary Ciceronian tradition represented by Richer of Reims, which held that the historian must fill in gaps in his story to meet rhetorical standards.

== Continuations ==
Several continuations of the Deeds were produced. Together, the original Gesta episcoporum Cameracensium and the continuations are known as the Gesta pontificum Cameracensium.

== Bibliography ==
- Bachrach, Bernard S.; Bachrach, David S.; Leese, Michael, eds. (2018). Deeds of the Bishops of Cambrai: Translation and Commentary. Routledge.
- Duby, Georges (1980) [1978]. The Three Orders: Feudal Society Imagined. Translated by Arthur Goldhammer. University of Chicago Press.
- Rech, Régis (2016). "Gesta episcoporum Cameracensium". In G. Dunphy; C. Bratu (eds.). Encyclopedia of the Medieval Chronicle. Brill Online. doi:10.1163/2213-2139_emc_SIM_01118.
- Riches, Theo Martin (2006). Bishop Gerard I of Cambrai (1012–1051) and the Representation of Authority in the Gesta Episcoporum Cameracensium (PhD dissertation). King's College, University of London.
- Riches, Theo Martin (2007). "The Function of the Gesta Episcoporum as Archive: Some Reflections on the Codex sancti Gisleni (MS Den Haag KB 75 f 15)". Jaarboek voor middeleeuwse geschiedenis. 10: 7–46.
- Stein, Robert M. (2006). "Sacred Authority and Secular Power: The Historical Argument of the Gesta Episcoporum Cameracensis". In Lawrence Besserman (ed.). Sacred and Secular in Medieval and Early Modern Cultures: New Essays. Palgrave Macmillan. pp. 149–165.
