= Louis de Berlaymont =

- Archbishop-Duke of Cambrai
- Diocese: Cambrai
- See: Notre Dame de Cambrai
- Elected: 15 September 1570
- Predecessor: Maximilian de Berghes
- Successor: Jean Sarazin

Personal details
- Born: 1542 Brussels, Duchy of Brabant, Habsburg Netherlands
- Died: 15 February 1596 (aged 53–54) Mons, County of Hainaut, Habsburg Netherlands
- Parents: Charles de Berlaymont

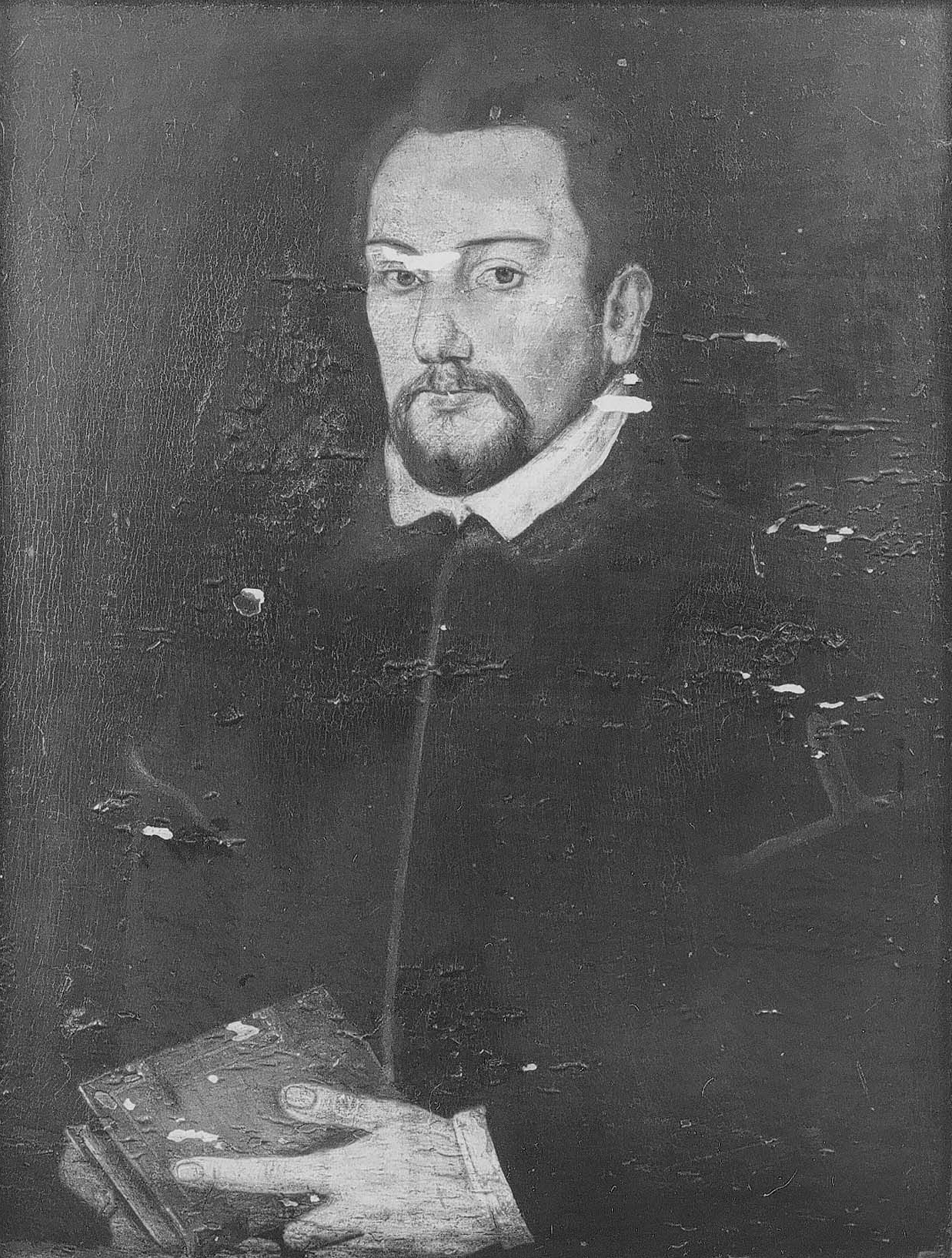
Mgr Louis de Berlaymont.jpg

Louis de Berlaymont (1542–1596) was an aristocratic clergyman in the Habsburg Netherlands who served as the second archbishop of Cambrai.

== Life ==
Berlaymont was born in Brussels, the son of Charles de Berlaymont, one of the leading members of the nobility of the Low Countries. On 15 September 1570, aged only 28, he was elected archbishop of Cambrai. When Francis, Duke of Anjou, took Cambrai in 1580, Berlaymont withdrew to Mons, in the County of Hainaut, governing the archdiocese from there. He was also provost of the Basilica of Saint Servatius in Maastricht from 1570 to 1596, as well as serving as apostolic administrator of the diocese of Tournai during the vacancy following the death of Jean Vendeville in 1592. He restored the altars of St John and St George in Tournai Cathedral. The French garrison was driven out of Cambrai by Pedro Henriquez de Acevedo, Count of Fuentes, on 3 October 1595, but the archbishop never returned to his see. He died in Mons on 15 February 1596.

Catholic Church titles
Preceded by Maximilian de Berghes	Archbishop of Cambrai; 1570–1596	Succeeded by Jean Sarazin
