= Boëtius Epo =

Boetius Epo
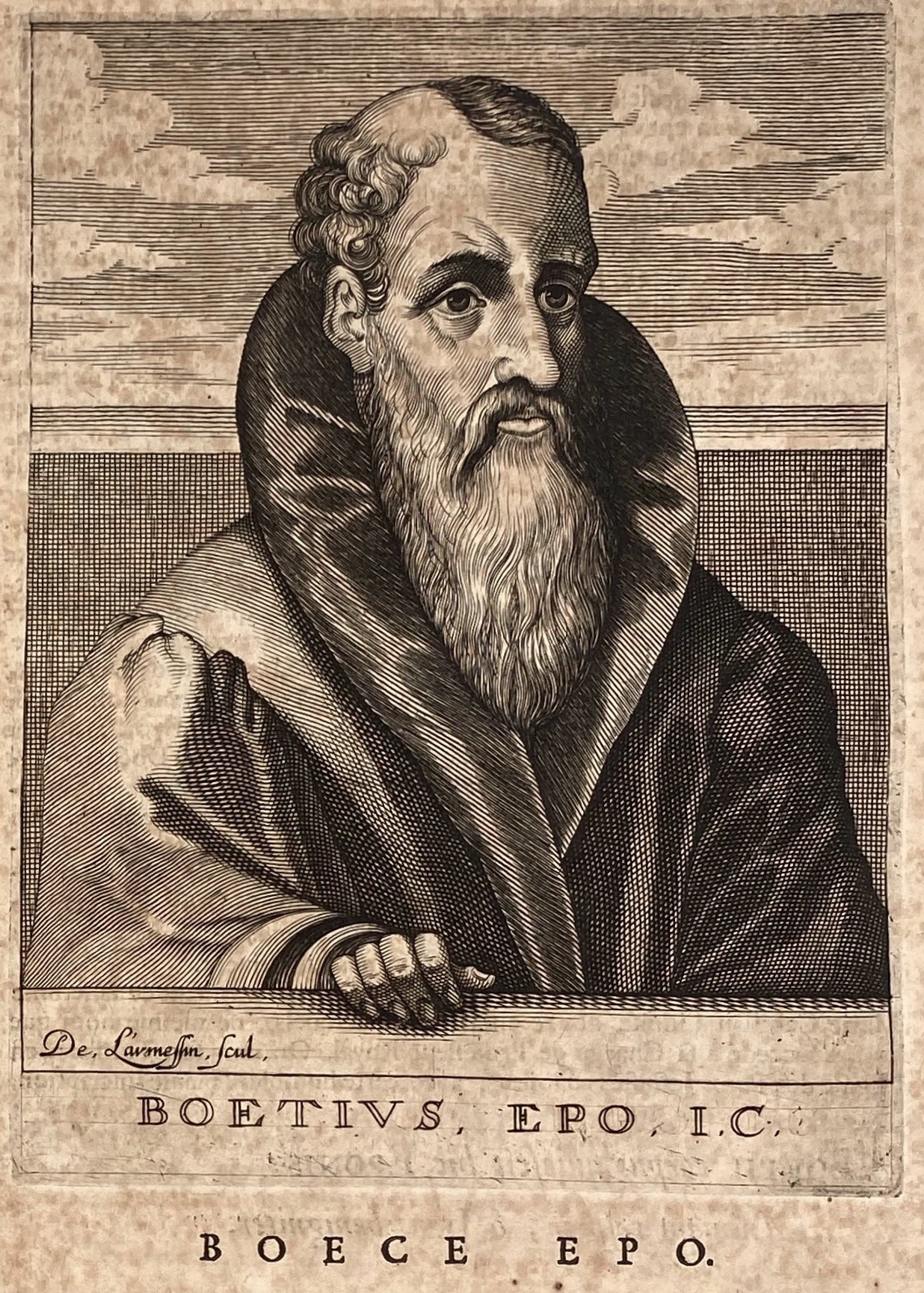
- Copperplate engraving by Nicolas de Larmessin.
- Born: 1529; Reduzum, Friesland, Netherlands
- Died: 16 November 1599
- Occupations: Jurist and scholar

Boetius Epo (1529–November 16, 1599) was a lawyer and scholar from the Low Countries. He was born at Reduzum, in Friesland, in 1529. He studied at Cologne and Leuven, and made such rapid progress in the acquisition of the learned languages, that at the age of twenty he gave public lectures on Homer. He afterwards taught, not only at Leuven but at Paris, jurisprudence, the belles-lettres, and theology, and afterwards went to Geneva with a view to inquire if the religious principles of John Calvin were worthy of the reputation they had gained. Not satisfied, however, with them, Boetius Epo returned to the Catholic Church in which he had been educated, and confining his studies to the Civil Law and Canon Law, took the degree of doctor in 1561, at Toulouse. He then returned to Leuven, where he lectured until he was chosen one of the professors of the new University of Douai, an office which he held for twenty-seven years. He died November 16, 1599. He wrote many works on law and ecclesiastical history.

== Notable works ==
- Epo, Boetius (1564). Antiqvi scriptoris ecclesiastici Ivliani Archiepiscopi olim Toletani Prognōstikōn, sive De futuro seculo libri tres. Duaci : Typis Lodouici de Winde. OCLC 71515117.
- Epo, Boetius (1578). Boetii Eponis Antiqvitatvm ecclesiasticarvm syntagmata IV : ad sacrosanctos patres patriæ Belgicos, regem nempe Catholicum ac ordines vel status vni uersos Belgij. Duaci : Ex officina Joannis Bogardi. OCLC 71438146.
- Epo, Boetius (1581). Commentarii novem testamentarii. Duacum : Bogard. OCLC 230971919.
- Epo, Boetius (1588). Heroicarvm Et Ecclesiasticarvm Qvæstionvm Libri VI. Duaci Bogardus. OCLC 257541134.
