= Hildoard =

Hildoard or Hildo, was bishop of Cambrai from 790 to 816.

He was a liturgical reformer, closely tied to the court of Charlemagne. His sacramentary is the only surviving exact copy, made around 812, of the Sacramentarium Hadrianum, sent out by Pope Hadrian I to Charlemagne.

He restored Maubeuge Abbey.
