= Lietbertus =

Saint Lietbertus
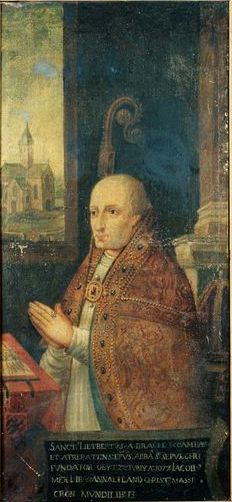
- Saint Lietbertus as founder of Holy Sepulchre Abbey (baroque painting in Cambrai Cathedral)
- Born: c. 1000
- Died: 1076
- Venerated in: Roman Catholic Church
- Feast: September 28

Saint Lietbertus (Lietbert, Libert, Liberat) of Brakel (or of Cambrai, de Lessines) (ca. 1010–1076) was bishop of Cambrai from 31 March 1051 to 28 September 1076. Liebertus was born to the Brabantian nobility at Opbrakel (a village in the present-day municipality of Brakel). He served as archdeacon and provost of the cathedral of Cambrai before his election as bishop.

== Pilgrimage ==
As bishop of Cambrai, he attempted a pilgrimage to the Holy Land in 1054 with some of his flock ("people of all ages and both sexes"), but did not reach it. He did, however, manage to cross the Danube, entering what is biographer calls "Pannonia" and met the king of Hungary, Andrew I, who promised to give the pilgrims protection as they passed through his lands. Lietbertus' party encountered dangers as it passed through Bulgaria, Dalmatia, Isauria, arriving at Corinth. At Corinth, Lietbertus visited the tomb of Saint Demetrius.

According to his biography, Lietbertus got as far as Cyprus:

The shores of Cyprus received the lord bishop, saved from the sea waves, together with all his men. Fearing the ruler of that island, whom they called Katapant and who was the second-in-command, and in order that they not fall into pagan hands, [the bishop] remained there from June 4 until July 31. [He stayed] until the day when--although he had expended a great deal of gold and believed he had resumed the marine crossing to Jerusalem--he was fraudulently taken back to Laodicea, because the sailors wished to avoid the ambushes of the pagans. While there he was bound again by delays until no hope of fulfilling his vow remained. At last, recalling the difficulty of his many journeys and on the advice of the bishop of Laodicea, he took up the sad path home, returning with Hélinand, the bishop of Laon (who at the same time had also gone to Jerusalem).

— Raoul of Saint-Sépulcre, Vita sancti Lietberti

== After his pilgrimage ==
He founded the abbey of Saint-Sépulcre (Holy Sepulchre) in 1064.

He defended Cambrai against Robert I, Count of Flanders, and excommunicated the castellan of Cambrai, Hugh I of Oisy, for which he got into conflict with the German Emperor.

== Biography ==
About the life and realisations of bishop Lietbertus two sources are available:

- Gesta Lietberti episcopi, written in two phases:
  - phase 1, covering the period 1051–1054, probably by the continuator of the Gesta episcoporum Cameracensium
  - phase 2, covering the period 1055–1076.
- Vita sancti Lietberti, written by Rodulfus, a monk of the abbey of Saint-Sépulcre. Edition: Vita Lietberti episcopi Cameracensis auctore Rudulfo monacho S. Sepuchri Cameracensis, HOFMEISTER A. ed., MGH Scriptores 30-2 (Leipzig 1926, 1934) 838–868.
