= Fulbert of Cambrai =

Bishop of Cambrai from 934 (died 956)

Fulbert was Bishop of Cambrai from 934 to 956, and from 948 the first bishop of Cambrai to hold the position of Count of Cambrai. In 954 he successfully directed the defence of Cambrai against Hungarian attackers. He died in July or August 956.
