= Federico Marcello Lante =

18th-century Catholic cardinal

His Eminence Federico Marcello Lante Montefeltro della Rovere
- Cardinal-Bishop
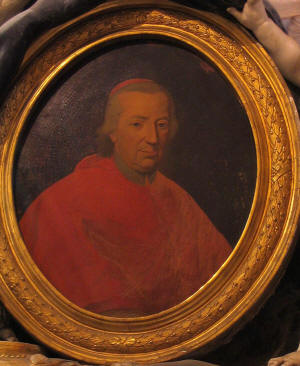

Orders
- Ordination: 25 December 1728
- Consecration: 19 October 1732 by Cardinal Annibale Albani
- Created cardinal: 9 September 1743 by Pope Benedict XIV

Personal details
- Born: 18 April 1695 Rome, Diocese of Rome
- Died: 3 March 1773 (aged 77) Rome, Diocese of Rome
- Parents: Antonio Lante Montefeltro della Rovere; Louise Angelique Charlotte de La Trémoille
- Coat of arms

Federico Marcello Lante Montefeltro della Rovere (18 April 1695 – 3 March 1773) was an Italian Catholic Cardinal and Archbishop.

== Early life ==
18 April 1695 in Rome. He was the youngest son of Antonio Lante Montefeltro della Rovere, 2nd Duke of Bomarzo, a descendant of the Lante family of Pisan origin, and Louise-Angélique de La Trémoille (1653–1698). Among his siblings were Luigi Lante Montefeltro della Rovere, who inherited their father's titles, Alessandro Lante Montefeltro della Rovere, who was created Duke of Santo-Gemini by King Louis I of Spain, and Marie Anne Césarine Lante Montefeltro della Rovere, who married Jean Baptiste de Croÿ, 5th Duke of Havré.

His paternal grandparents were Ippolito Lante Montefeltro della Rovere and Maria Cristina d'Altemps (a daughter of Pietro d'Altemps, Duke of Gallese and Marquess of Soriano, and Angelica de' Medici). His maternal grandparents were Louis II de La Trémoille, Duke of Noirmoutier, and Renée Julie Aubery de Tilleport. His maternal aunt was the French courtier and royal favourite Marie Anne de La Trémoille, who is known for being a de facto ruler of Spain from 1701 until 1714.

== Career ==
Lanza served as President of the Legation of Urbino and Titular Archbishop of Petra from 1732 to 1743. On 9 September 1743, Pope Benedict XIV elevated him to the rank of Cardinal in the consistory.

He served as Cardinal-Priest of San Pancrazio fuori le Mura from 1745 to 1753 when he was appointed Camerlengo of the College of Cardinals, serving from 1753 to 1754. Also, in 1753, he became Cardinal-Priest of San Silvestro in Capite, serving until 1759. From 1759 until his death, he was Prefect of the Congregation of Good Government. From 1759 until 1763, he was Cardinal Bishop of Palestrina. In 1763 he became Cardinal Bishop of Porto and Santa Rufina and Sub-Dean of the College of Cardinals, serving as both until his death in 1773.

=== Conclaves ===
As a Cardinal, he participated in two conclaves: the Conclave of 1758, which elected Pope Clement XIII, and the Conclave of 1769, which elected Pope Clement XIV.

== Personal life ==
Cardinal Lante died on 3 March 1773, at the age of 77, in Rome.

Catholic Church titles
Preceded by Alamanno Salviati	President of the Legation of Urbino; 1732–1743	Succeeded by Giacomo Oddi
Preceded by Antonio Saverio Gentili	Titular Archbishop of Petra	Succeeded by Filippo Acciaiuoli
Preceded by Gioacchino Besozzi	Cardinal-Priest of San Pancrazio fuori le Mura; 1745–1753	Succeeded by Giuseppe Maria Feroni
Preceded by Carlo Alberto Guidobono Cavalchini	Camerlengo of the College of Cardinals; 1753–1754	Succeeded by Francesco Landi Pietra
Preceded by Antonio Maria Ruffo	Cardinal-Priest of San Silvestro in Capite; 1753–1759	Succeeded by Ferdinando Maria de' Rossi
Preceded by Giorgio Doria	Prefect of the Congregation of Good Government; 1759–1773	Succeeded by Antonio Casali
Preceded by Giuseppe Spinelli	Cardinal Bishop of Palestrina; 1759–1763	Succeeded by Giovanni Francesco Stoppani
Preceded by Camillo Paolucci	Cardinal Bishop of Porto and Santa Rufina; 1763–1773	Succeeded by Giovanni Francesco Albani
Preceded by Camillo Paolucci	Sub-Dean of the College of Cardinals; 1763–1773	Succeeded by Giovanni Francesco Albani
