= Joaquina Téllez-Girón, Marchioness of Santa Cruz =

Spanish aristocrat (1784–1851)

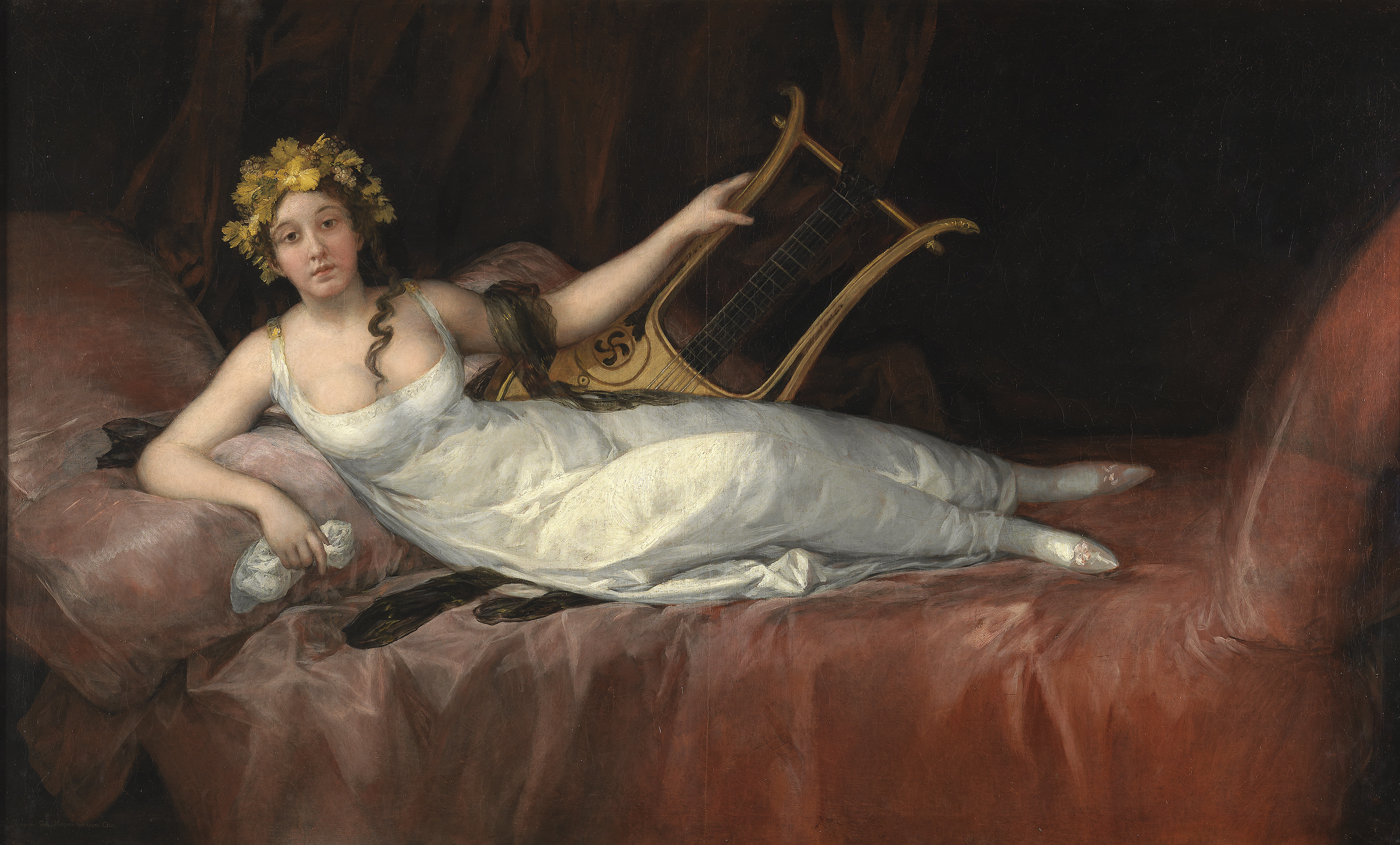
Portrait of the Marchioness of Santa Cruz by Goya

Doña Joaquina Téllez-Girón y Pimentel, 2nd Countess of Osilo, iure uxoris Marchioness of Santa Cruz (Spanish: Doña Joaquina Téllez-Girón, marquesa de Santa Cruz; 21 September 1784 – 17 November 1851) was a Spanish courtier. She served as the Camarera mayor de Palacio for Isabella II of Spain in 1834-1841 and a second time in 1843-1847.

== Life and career ==
She was the daughter of Pedro Téllez-Girón, 9th Duke of Osuna and María Josefa Pimentel, 12th Countess-Duchess of Benavente.

In 1801, she married José Gabriel de Silva-Bazán y Waldstein, the future Marquess of Santa Cruz.

She is known as the subject of an 1805 portrait by Francisco José de Goya y Lucientes, a family friend.

In 1834 she was appointed Aya de las Infantas as well as Camarera mayor de Palacio to the minor queen, Isabella II, and her sister.

== Sources ==
- Antonio Marichalar, Riesgo y ventura del duque de Osuna Escrito

Court offices
Preceded by Rosa María de Carvajal	Camarera mayor de Palacio to the Queen of Spain; 1834–1841	Succeeded by María Benita de los Dolores
Preceded by Juana de Vega	Camarera mayor de Palacio to the Queen of Spain; 1843–1847	Succeeded by María Manuela Kirkpatrick
