= Joseph-Emmanuel de La Trémoille =

Cardinal Joseph-Emmanuel de la Trémoille (1659-1720).

Joseph-Emmanuel de La Trémoille (7 July 1659 – 9 January 1720 in Rome) was a French Cardinal.

He was the son of Louis II de La Trémoille (1612–1666), Duke of Noirmoutier, and Renée Julie Aubéry, Lady of Tilleport.
His elder sister was the influential Marie Anne de La Trémoille, princesse des Ursins, who played a central role in the Spanish royal court during the first years of the reign of Philip V.

He was created Cardinal of Trinità dei Monti, during the consistory of 17 May 1706, by Pope Clement XI. That same year, he was appointed French ambassador before the Holy See by Louis XIV.

He was commendatory Abbot of Saint-Étienne de Caen from 1710, of Lagny Abbey, of Notre-Dame de Sorèze, of Notre-Dame de Sylvanès, of Saint-Amand Abbey, and of Grandselve Abbey from 1707.

In 1714, he became Camerlengo of the Sacred College of Cardinals. He was appointed Bishop of Bayeux in January 1716. In April 1718, he became Archbishop of Cambrai, a position he held until his death in 1720.
