= Antonio Lante Montefeltro della Rovere =

Antonio Lante Montefeltro della Rovere (1648 – 5 May 1716) was an Italian nobleman of the House of della Rovere and was Duke of Bomarzo and Prince of Belmonte.

== Early life ==
Lante was the eldest of four children of Ippolito Lante Montefeltro della Rovere and Maria Cristina d'Altemps.

His paternal grandparents were Marcantonio Lante and Lucrezia della Rovere. His grand-uncle was Cardinal Marcello Lante della Rovere. His uncle, Lodovico Lante, married Olimpia Cesi (a daughter of Federico Cesi, Duke of Acquasparta). His maternal grandparents were Pietro d'Altemps, Duke of Gallese and Marquess of Soriano, and Angelica de' Medici (a granddaughter of Giulio de' Medici).

== Career ==
He inherited his father's titles and became the second Duke of Bomarzo. When the Lante family purchased the comune of Belmonte from the Mattei (presumably on the death of Luigi Mattei in 1675), Lante became the first Prince of Belmonte.

Thereafter, Lante travelled to Paris where he was married in 1683. After his wedding, the two returned to Rome but travelled between the two capitals.

== Personal life ==
In February 1683 while in Paris, Lante married Louise-Angélique de La Trémoille (1653–1698), a daughter of Louis II de La Trémoille, Duke of Noirmoutier, and Renée Julie Aubery de Tilleport. Her sister was the French courtier and royal favourite Marie Anne de La Trémoille, who is known for being a de facto ruler of Spain from 1701 until 1714. They had:

- Luigi Lante Montefeltro della Rovere (1683–1727), inherited his father's titles and married Angela Maria Vaini, daughter of Guido Vaini, 1st Prince of Cantalupo, Duke of Selci, Marquess of Vacona, Lord of Gavignano, and Maria Anna Ceuli (a daughter of the Marquess of Carretto).
- Artemisia Lante Montefeltro della Rovere (1690–1692), who died young.
- Alessandro Lante Montefeltro della Rovere (born 1691), who was created Duke of Santo-Gemini by King Louis I of Spain; he married Francisca Xaviera Fernández de Córdoba Carrillo y Mendoza, Marchioness of the Casta, Countess of Alacuás, Baroness of Bolbaite.
- Marie Anne Césarine Lante Montefeltro della Rovere (1693–1753), who married Jean Baptiste de Croÿ, 5th Duke of Havré.
- Federico Marcello Lante Montefeltro della Rovere (1694–1774), who was elevated to Cardinal by Pope Benedict XIV.

When Trémoille died in 1698, in Paris, Lante returned to Rome though a number of his children stayed behind and were appointed to various titles by French and Spanish monarchs.
