= Louis II de La Trémoille (1612–1666) =

French nobleman (1612-1666)

Louis de La Trémoille
- Duke of Noirmoutier; Duke of Montmirail
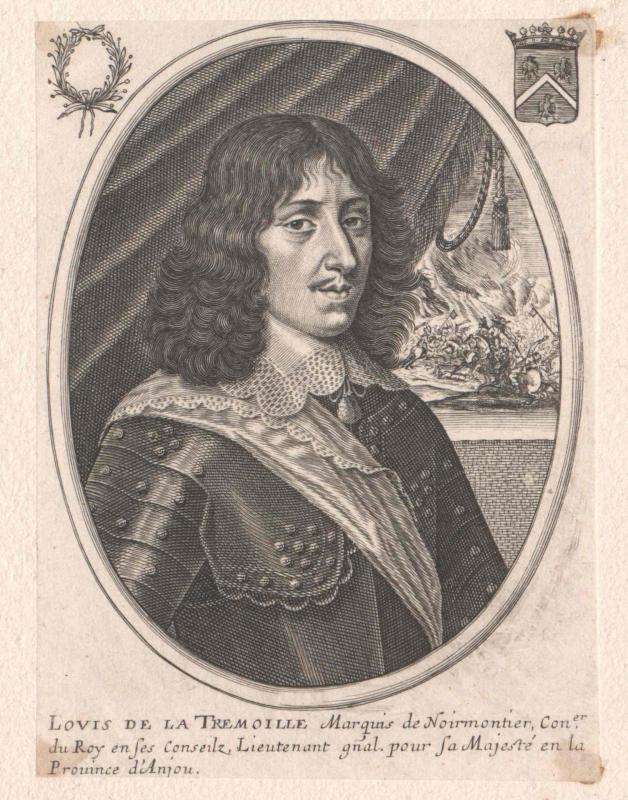
- Born: 25 December 1612
- Died: 12 October 1666 (aged 53); Châteauvillain
- Noble family: La Trémoille
- Spouse: Renée Aubéry (m. 1640; died 1666)
- Issue: 9, including Marie Anne de La Trémoille, Princess of Ursins
- Father: Louis I de La Trémoille
- Mother: Lucrèce Bouhier de Beaumarchais

Louis II de La Trémoille (25 December 1612 – 12 October 1666), Marquess, then Duke of Noirmoutier, was a French aristocrat often simply referred to as "Noirmoutier". A General and Maréchal de camp who fought at the Battle of Lens and in The Fronde, following which he served as Governor of Mount Olympus in Charleville-Mézières.

== Early life ==
Noirmoutier was born on 25 December 1612. He was the son of Louis I de La Trémoille, Marquess of Noirmoutier and Lucrèce Bouhier de Beaumarchais. From his mother's second marriage to Marshal Nicolas de L'Hôpital, Duke of Vitry, he was the half-brother of François-Marie de L'Hospital, Duke of Vitry, who became the Ambassador to Bavaria.

A member of the cadet branch of the La Trémoille family which held the exalted rank of prince étranger in France, his paternal grandfather was François II de La Trémoïlle (a son of Claude de La Trémoïlle-Noirmoutier). The marquessate was created in 1584. His maternal grandfather was Vincent Bouhier, Lord of Beaumarchais and Baron of Plessis-aux-Tournelles. Through his maternal aunt, Marie Bouhier de Beaumarchais (wife of Charles de La Vieuville), he was a first cousin of Charles II de La Vieuville, 2nd Duke of La Vieuville.

== Career ==
Coat of arms of Louis II de La Trémoille

A soldier, he took part in numerous sieges and battles. His first battle was in 1635 at the Battle of Avesnes, where he was taken prisoner by the Bavarians from 1643 to 1644, after the French defeat at Dütlingen in 1642. After his release, he took command of the Noirmoutiers regiment, with which he distinguished himself at the Battle of Lens in 1648. He was made Maréchal de camp after the Siege of Perpignan. He was with Marshal Villeroy at the siege of La Mothe and then with the Duke of Orléans during the capture of Armentières and Le Quesnoy. As Governor of Anjou in 1643, he took part in the Sieges of Courtray and Dunkirk before being wounded at Dixmude.

=== The Fronde ===
It was during The Fronde that his career took a turn. Initially linked to Jean François Paul de Gondi (better known as Cardinal de Retz) and the Duchess of Longueville, with François de La Rochefoucauld, they convinced her brother, Armand de Bourbon, Prince of Conti, and the Duke of Longueville to join the parliamentary Fronde.

During the Siege of Paris in 1649, at the head of nearly a thousand horses, he took part in numerous daring sorties to clear the way for the supply of Paris. During one of these sorties, La Rochefoucauld, who had gone towards him to cover a convoy of supplies that Noirmoutier was escorting, was attacked and wounded by the loyalist troops of the Count of Grancey. La Rochefoucauld complained that Noirmoutier had continued on his way to Paris without coming to his aid.

Following the Peace of Rueil, Noirmoutier received a triple promotion: he was made a brevet Duke (a non-hereditary Duke), his title of Lieutenant général, acquired among the Frondeurs, was confirmed, and he was made Governor of Mount Olympus, a fortress near Charleville. There was some difficulty in including him in the Frondeurs' amnesty. The Court took umbrage at the fact that he had led the Spanish army commanded by Archduke Leopold Wilhelm of Austria against France. Gondi considered that he owed him these multiple pardons. The two then had a falling out.

== Personal life ==
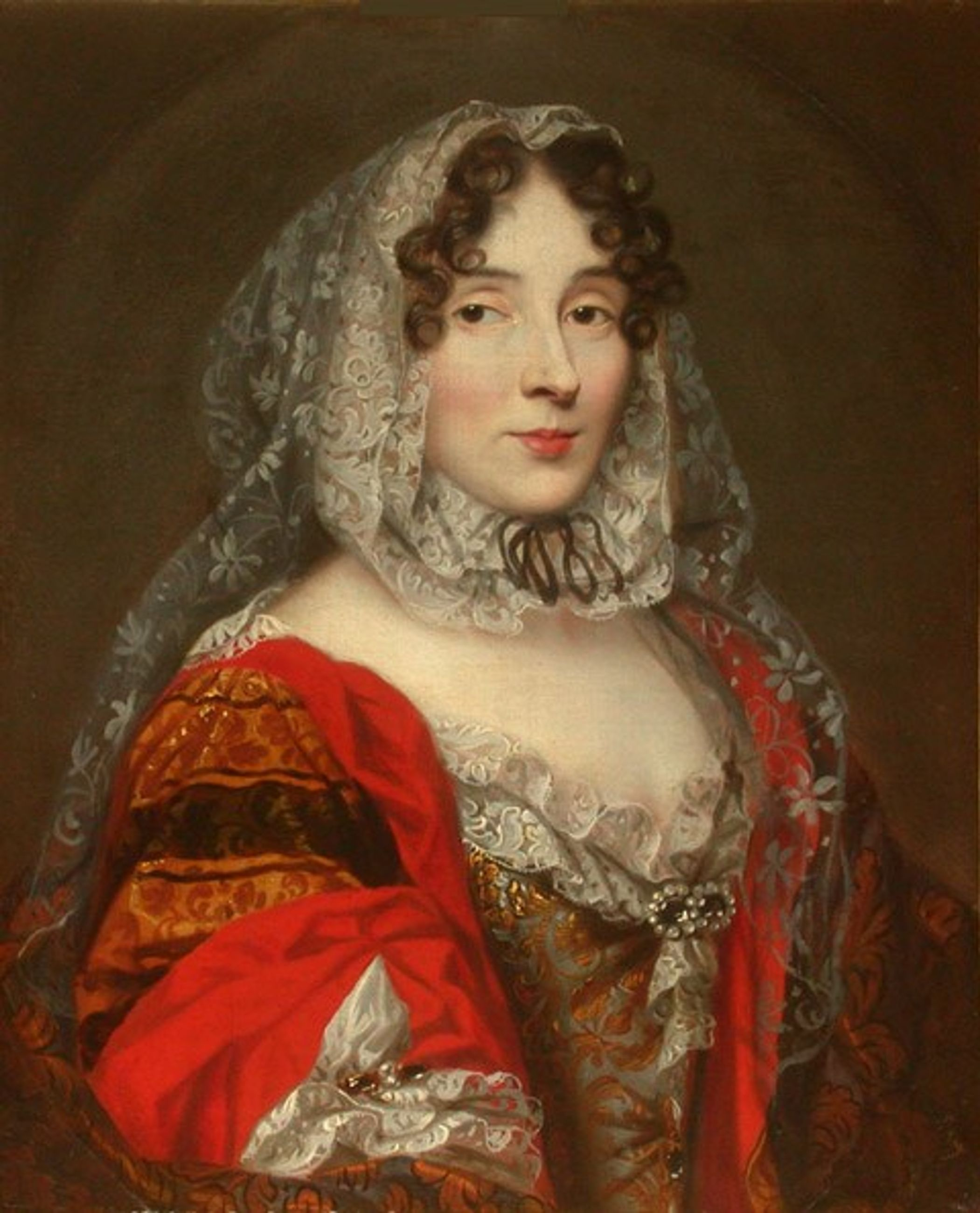
Portrait of his daughter, the Princess of Ursins

On 30 November 1640, Noirmoutier was married to Renée Julie Aubéry, a daughter of the State Councillor, Jean Aubéry, Lord of Tilleport, and Françoise Le Breton. Together, they were the parents of nine children, including:

- Marie Anne de La Trémoille, Princess of Ursins (1642–1722), who married Adrien Blaise de Talleyrand, Prince of Chalais. After his death in 1670, she remarried in Rome to Prince Flavio Orsini, Duke of Bracciano, and became an important figure there, defending the interests of France in Rome; she was a close friend of Françoise d'Aubigné, Marquise de Maintenon (the second wife of King Louis XIV).
- Louis-Alexandre de La Trémoille, Marquess of La Trémoille (c. 1642–1667), who was forced into exile with his brother-in-law, the Prince of Chalais, in Spain following the duel of four against four in which Pierre de Beauvilliers, son of the Duke of Saint-Aignan, was killed.
- Antoine-François de La Trémoille (1652–1733), who was created Duke of Royan in 1707, a friend of Saint-Simon; he had the Hôtel de Noirmoutier built by Jean Courtonne, which today is the residence of the prefect of the Île-de-France region in Paris; he married Marguerite de La Grange-Trianon in 1688. After her death in 1689, he married Marie Élisabeth Duret in 1700.
- Louise-Angélique de La Trémoille (1655–1698), who married Antonio Lante Montefeltro della Rovere, son of Ippolito Lante Montefeltro della Rovere, in 1683, becoming Princess of Belmonte.
- Joseph-Emmanuel de La Trémoille (1659–1720), who became Bishop of Bayeux and Archbishop of Cambrai; he was created Cardinal by Pope Clement XI in 1706.

Noirmoutier died on 12 October 1666, at 53 years old, at Châteauvillain. His widow, Renée, died on 20 February 1679.

=== Descendants ===
Through his daughter Louise-Angélique, he was a grandfather of Luigi Lante Montefeltro della Rovere, 3rd Duke of Bomarzo; Alessandro Lante Montefeltro della Rovere, who was created Duke of Santo-Gemini by King Louis I of Spain; Marie Anne Césarine Lante Montefeltro della Rovere, who married Jean Baptiste de Croÿ, 5th Duke of Havré; and Cardinal Federico Marcello Lante Montefeltro della Rovere (1694–1774).
