= María Isidra de la Cerda y Guzmán =

Doña María Isidra de la Cerda y Guzmán, 14th countess of Paredes and duchess of Nájera (died 12 November 1810), was a Spanish courtier. She was the Camarera mayor de Palacio to the queen of Spain, Maria Louisa of Parma, in 1793–1808.

She was born to Isidro Manuel de la Cerda y Téllez-Girón, XIII Count of Paredes de Nava, V Marquis of Laguna de Camero Viejo, the chief steward (mayordomo mayor) to the Queen Mother, Isabel Farnese, and Teresa María Clara de Guzmán y Guevara. She married in 1756 to Diego Ventura de Guzmán y Fernández de Córdoba, marqués de Montealegre y conde de Oñate. She was the mother of María Isidra de Guzmán y de la Cerda.

She served as lady-in-waiting to Maria Louisa for many years until she was promoted and appointed to the post of Camarera mayor de Palacio to queen in 1793. The following year, in 1794, she was made Aya or Governess of the royal children in succession to the Duchess of Miranda, although she was not formally given the title until 1799.

She fullfilled the double position of senior lady-in-waiting and royal governess until the king and queen was exiled in 1808. She retred from court and died two years later.

Court offices
Preceded by Florentina de Pizarro Picolomino	Camarera mayor de Palacio to the Queen of Spain; 1793–1808	Succeeded by María de la Encarnación
