= María Isidra de Guzmán y de la Cerda =

Spanish translator (1767–1803)

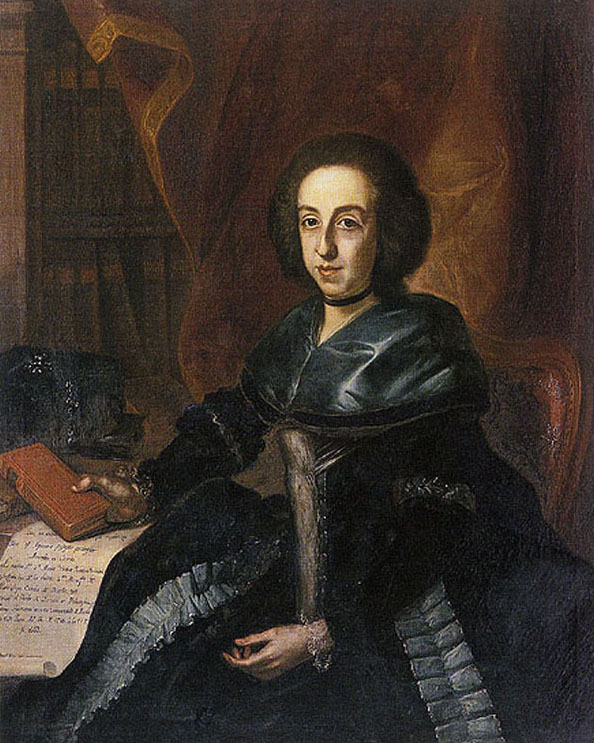
María Isidra de Guzmán y de la Cerda

María Isidra de Guzmán y de la Cerda (October 31, 1767 – March 5, 1803) was a Spanish noble, courtier and scholar. She is regarded to be the first woman to receive a Doctor of Philosophy degree in Spain (1785).

== Life ==
She was the daughter of Diego Ventura de Guzmán y Fernández de Córdoba, 7th Marquis de Montealegre, 13th Count of Oñate and María Isidra de la Cerda y Guzmán (1742-1811), 19th Duchess of Najera, Grandee of Spain. She was given an unusually good education and described as the child prodigy of the king. Her mother was a lady-in-waiting to the Princess of Asturias, and eventually served as camarera mayor de la Reina to the Queen in 1793-1808.

She was given special royal dispensation from Charles III of Spain to study at the humanistic and literary faculty of the University of Alcalá, where she graduated in 1785 as a Doctor of Philosophy. She was named honorary professor of philosophy at the university and called Doctora de Alcalá.

She was elected an honorary member of the Real Academia de la Historia and Real Academia Española, the first female member of the Real Sociedad Económica Matritense de Amigos del País (1784), and decorated with the Junta de Damas Nobles de Honor y Mérito and the Orden de damas nobles de María Luisa.

In 1787, she translated Columella from Latin.

In 1789, she married Alfonso de Sousa, 12th Marquis of Guadalcázar, Grandee of Spain.

She also served as lady-in-waiting to the queen, Maria Louisa of Spain.

== See also ==
- María Pascuala Caro Sureda
