= Inés de Zúñiga y Velasco =

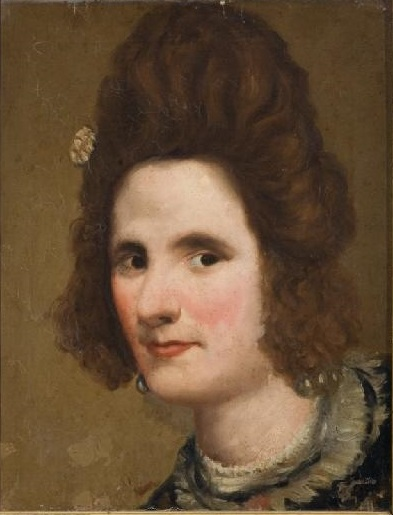
Busto de mujer Antigua (Museo de Huesca)

Inés de Zúñiga y Velasco, Countess and Duchess of Olivares (1584–1647) was a Spanish noblewoman and courtier. She was married to the influential royal favorite Gaspar de Guzmán, Count-Duke of Olivares.

She served as lady-in-waiting to Margaret of Austria, Queen of Spain, as the Camarera mayor de palacio to Elisabeth of France, Queen of Spain in 1627–1643, and as the Aya de los Infantes (royal governess) of Balthasar Charles, Prince of Asturias and his siblings.

== Life and career ==
Inés de Zúñiga y Velasco was born to Gaspar de Zúñiga, 5th Count of Monterrey, and Inés de Velasco y Aragón. Prior to her marriage, she served as maid of honour to the queen, Margaret of Austria. She was described as beautiful and was well liked by the royal family. In September 1607, she married her cousin, Gaspar de Guzmán, Count-Duke of Olivares.

Her husband had a successful career at the royal court, and became known as a powerful royal favorite and advisor to the king: he was made Duke in 1621, and became Minister in 1622. Due to her husband's position, his family was moved in to apartments at the Royal Palace Alcázar in Madrid and regularly attended court.

In 1627, due to the influence of her husband, she was appointed to the office of Camarera mayor de Palacio to the queen, Elisabet of France. As such she had the first rank of all the ladies-in-waiting to the queen. The same year, at the birth of Balthasar Charles, Prince of Asturias, she was additionally appointed to the prestigious office of Aya de los Infantes, royal governess to the royal children.

Inés de Zúñiga y Velasco was described as the dominant but also loyal and supporting wife of the Duke of Olivares. Her husband suffered from bouts of depression, and her forceful nature and support of him, and efficient nature, resulted in her being called a "masculine" woman, which was intended as a compliment. The queen deeply resented the Duke of Olivares, but she appear to have had a good relationship to the Duchess of Olivares.

On June 1643, the Duke of Olivares fell from power and was obliged to leave court for his exile to Toro on 12 June. The Duchess of Olivares was not immediately affected by her husband's fall. Despite the queen's animosity toward the Duke of Olivares, the Duchess continued to serve as the queen's first lady-in-waiting and governess of the royal children until November 1643, when she was relieved from service by the king and allowed to retire from court. She then left to reunite with her husband in Toro. She kept a good relationship to the queen.

== Legacy ==
Inés de Zúñiga y Velasco was the subject of the novel of Benito Pérez Galdós, Doña Perfecta.

Court offices
| Preceded by Juana Enriquez de Velasco | Camarera mayor de Palacio to the Queen of Spain; 1627–1643 | Succeeded by Ana de Cardona y Aragón |
