= María Andrea Casamayor =

Spanish mathematician and teacher

María Andresa Casamayor
- Born: María Juana Rosa Andresa Casamayor de La Coma; 30 November 1720; Zaragoza, Spain
- Died: 23 October 1780 (aged 59); Zaragoza, Spain
- Resting place: Parroquia del Pilar, Zaragoza, Spain
- Known for: Mathematician, writer, girls' school teacher
- Scientific career
- Fields: Mathematics

María Andresa Casamayor (30 November 1720 – 23 October 1780) was a Spanish mathematician, writer and Spanish girls' school teacher. She stood out for her mathematical thinking and work with numbers and made significant contributions to arithmetic, which at the time was considered the exclusive domain of men. She is one of the few 18th century Spanish women scientists and mathematicians whose work has been preserved, including María Pascuala Caro Sureda.

== Family ==
Maria Andresa Casamayor de La Coma was born on 30 November (Saint Andrew's Day) 1720. She was baptized the next day in the Church of El Pilar (Spanish: Iglesia del Pilar) and given the name of Maria Juana Rosa Andresa. Born into a wealthy family of textile merchants, Maria Andresa spent her childhood in a house on Pilar Street (Spanish: Calle del Pilar). Her father was the French merchant Juan Joseph Casamayor born in Oloron (France), son of Maria Abales and Juan Casamayor. Her mother was a Zaragozan, Juana Rosa de La Coma, daughter of merchant Juan de La Coma and of Maria Alexandre, both of French origins. At the time, the French community was made up of a large number of individuals who maintained tight trade connections and dominated the trade in Zaragoza. Her parents married on 13 April 1705 and Maria Andresa was the seventh of nine children.

== Works ==
She published two books on arithmetic:

- Her first published book is entitled Tyrocinio aritmético (1738), From a mathematical point of view, the book is eminently practical and written in a fresh and supple language. A great number or examples based on real cases are given to the reader. Thus, one can learn directly the four rules of arithmetic: addition, subtraction, multiplication, and division. In addition, the examples covered in this book indicate that she had precise knowledge of length, weight, and currency units that were used to perform the daily trade activities in the 18th century. As the Dominican priest Pedro Martínez, a friend and collaborator of Maria Andresa, revealed in the review of the book, "her aim, in this brief piece of work, is to bring the education to the many who have no means to achieve it". Thus, according to her professional profile, Maria Andresa Casamayor is to be commended for her unusually great arithmetic ability and deep concern for education.
- El para sí solo, her second book, is a 109-page unpublished manuscript on advanced arithmetic.

She wrote under a male pseudonym, her nom de plume being Casandro Mamés de La Marca y Araioa. This name was a perfect anagram formed by rearranging all the letters that compose her own name, Maria Andresa Casamayor de La Coma. Oddly enough, there is a name spelling mistake in the source of this information, a quotation from the "New Bibliography of Aragonese Writers", (Spanish: Biblioteca nueva de los escritores aragoneses) by Félix Latassa. In Latassa's catalogue, Maria Andresa is listed under the name of "Maria Andrea". Following Latassa, the name Maria Andrea is still used today. However, according to the baptismal certificate, she was named Maria Andresa.

In the Tyrocinio, Casandro claimed to be a "disciple of the Piarist School" (Spanish: Escuela Pía) and dedicated the book to the same school, "Escuela Pía del Colegio de Santo Tomás de Zaragoza".

== Girls' school teacher ==
With the death of her father in 1738, and that of the friend and collaborator, Pedro Martínez, in 1739, the young Maria Andresa Casamayor had lost her main support. Maria Andresa never married or entered a religious order, as expected from women in the Aragonese society of that time. She had to work to support herself financially. For the greater part of her life, she taught at a girls' school, working as a teacher of primary education in the public schools of the city. She lived in a house that had been given to her as part of her payment. The building still exists today and is located on Palomar street (Spanish: Calle Palomar) in Zaragoza.

== Honors ==
In 2009, the City Council of Zaragoza renamed a street in her honor (originally "Grupo Jose Antonio Girón"). A street named after Zaragoza's famous woman scientist can also be found in Gijón.

In 2018, she was included in the periodic table of women scientists (Spanish: La Tabla Periódica de las Científicas), which represents women in science from around the world.

== Bibliography ==
- Casado Ruiz de Lóizaga, Maria José (2006). Las damas del laboratorio. Madrid: Debate. ISBN 978-8483066881
- Bernués, Julio; Miana, Pedro J. (2019). "Soñando con números, María Andresa Casamayor (1720–1780)". arXiv:1901.07389 [math.HO].
- Latassa, Félix (1802). Biblioteca nueva de los escritores aragoneses, Vol. V, 305 pages.
