= Rosa María de Carvajal Manrique de Lara =

Doña Rosa María de Carvajal Manrique de Lara, Marchioness of Bedmar y Escalona (1765-1840), was a Spanish courtier. She was the Camarera mayor de Palacio to the queen of Spain, in 1823–1834.

She was born to Mariano Joaquín de Carvajal Vargas y Brun (1742–1796), count de Castillejo and Puerto, duke of San Carlos, and Mariana Eusebia Manrique de Lara y Carrillo de Albornoz. She married in 1799 to Antonio María de Acuña y Fernández de Miranda, IX marquis of Bedmar (1766-1810).

Both her father and her brother were courtiers. She served as dama de la reina to Infanta Maria Francisca and queen Amelia before she was appointed Camarera in 1823. She was described as an ultra-absolutist royalist, and she was one of the absolutists that was appointed to high offices at the royal court after the reintroduction of absolute monarchy in 1823. She was loyal to the king, and reportedly met with him regularly to give him reports of any potentially valuable political information she noticed in the royal court during her service.

After the death of the king in 1833, she came in to conflict with the now queen regent, Maria Christina. As an ultra-royalist, she became allied with the Carlists during a time when the queen regent allied herself with the liberals to protect the rights of queen Isabella II against the Carlists. On 15 September 1834, she was obliged to turn in a list over the ladies harboring Carlist sympathies to the chamberlain during the purge of Carlists among the court staff. As a consequence of the purge, she was herself fired without wages on 3 December of that year and replaced with Joaquina Téllez-Girón, Marchioness of Santa Cruz.

Court offices
Preceded by Maria Josefa Contreras	Camarera mayor de Palacio to the Queen of Spain; 1823–1834	Succeeded by Joaquina Téllez-Girón
