= Florentina de Pizarro Picolomino =

Spanish courtier

Doña Florentina de Pizarro Picolomino, Marchioness of Bélgida (1727-1794), was a Spanish courtier. She was the Camarera mayor de Palacio to the queen of Spain, Maria Louisa of Parma, in 1788–1793.

She was born to Juan de la Cruz Pizarro Piccolomini de Aragón (1697–1771) and Juana Josefa de Herrera Ayala y Llarena. She married in 1754 to Pascual Benito Bellvís de Moncada y Mendoza Ibáñez de Segovia.

She was appointed Camarera mayor de Palacio to Infanta Mariana Vitória of Braganza in 1785. Later that year, she was appointed to the same position to the Crown Princess, the Princess of Asturias and the future Queen, Maria Louisa of Parma. She succeeded Cayetana Silva y Alagón, who had served Maria Louisa since her arrival to Spain but had not performed her task to the liking of the king, Charles III, who when he appointed Pizarro Picolomino tasked her with "rectifying the disorders of which His Majesty is well aware" in the Household and private life of his daughter-in-law.

She was confirmed in her position when Maria Luisa became queen in 1788. She requested to retire due to healh concerns in 1793, and kept her salary until her death the following year.

Court offices
Preceded by Rosa María de las Nieves	Camarera mayor de Palacio to the Queen of Spain; 1788–1793	Succeeded by María Isidra de la Cerda
