= María Teresa de Benavides =

Doña María Teresa de Benavides y Dávila-Corella, duchess de Frías (died 1704), was a Spanish courtier. She was the Camarera mayor de Palacio to the queen of Spain, in 1696–1700.

== Life and career ==
She was born to Diego de Benavides y Bazán, 8th count de Santisteban del Puerto and viceroy of Peru, and Antonia de Corella y Dávila She married in 1660 to Lluís Ramon d'Aragó. She remarried to Íñigo Melchor Fernández de Velasco, duke of Frias.

Her second husband was mayor dome del rey, which may have played a role in her own career. She was appointed to the post of Camarera mayor de Palacio to the queen of Spain, Maria Anna of Neuburg, in 1696. In 1701, she followed the queen dowager, who was ordered to leave Madrid, to her retirement in Toledo. She showed no enthusiasm to accompany the queen dowager to France, and retired from her office in 1702.

Court offices
Preceded by Juana de Armendáriz	Camarera mayor de Palacio to the Queen of Spain; 1696–1700	Succeeded by Marie Anne de La Trémoille
