= Juana de Aragón y Cortés =

Spansh courtier

Doña Juana de Aragón y Cortés, Duchess of Terranova (1619–1692), was a Spanish courtier. She was the Camarera mayor de Palacio to the queen of Spain, in 1679–1680.

== Life and career ==
She was born to Diego de Aragón y Tagliavia, IV duke of Terranova, prince of Castelvetrano, and Estefanía Carrillo de Mendoza y Cortés. She married in 1639 Héctor (Ettore) Pignatelli d'Aragona, VI duke of Monteleone (1620–1674).

She was appointed to the post of Camarera mayor de Palacio in 1679. She was dispatched to welcome the new queen, Marie Louise of Orleans, upon her arrival in Spain.

She was described as an intelligent but also strict and arrogant character, who did not hesitate to correct the queen in protocol issues. When queen Marie Louise arrived in Spain, already displeased with the idea of living in Spain and despaired by having to leave Spain, she immediately clashed with the Duchess of Terranova and the adherence of strict Spanish court protocol the latter tried to enforce upon her. Upon the order of the Duchess of Terranova, Marie Louise had to flatten her curls, discard her French fashion in favor of the stiff Spanish farthingale and a corset that flattened her breasts, banned her from riding and forbad anyone from touching her, and warned the king that his bride was frivolous.

The conflict between the queen and Terranova caused the latter to be fired from her post on the request of the queen in August 1680. The incident was considered a scandal, since the post was normally a lifetime position. She was however discharged with full honors and allowed to keep all status and privileges.

Court offices
Preceded by Elvira Ponce de León	Camarera mayor de Palacio to the Queen of Spain; 1679–1680	Succeeded by Juana de Armendáriz
