= Antonia Fernández de Cordoba Sarmiento =

Doña Antonia Fernández de Cordoba Sarmiento, Countess of la Puebla del Maestre (1764-1819), was a Spanish courtier. She was the Camarera mayor de Palacio to the queen of Spain, Maria Isabel of Portugal, in 1816–1818.

She was born to Juan de Mata Fernández de Córdoba, Spínola de la Cerda, gentilhombre de Cámara to the king, and María Ana Sarmiento de Sotomayor.

She married in 1784 to Francisco de Paula Fernández de Córdoba y Pacheco (1763–1824), XVIII count la Puebla del Maestre.

She was appointed to the post of Camarera mayor de Palacio to queen in 1816.

Court offices
Preceded by María de la Encarnación	Camarera mayor de Palacio to the Queen of Spain; 1816–1818	Succeeded by Maria Josefa Contreras
