= Leonor de Mascareñas =

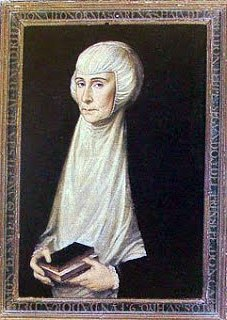

Leonor de Mascareñas (died 1583), was a Portuguese courtier.

She was the lady-in-waiting and confidante of the queen regent of Spain, Isabella of Portugal, and served as the royal governess of Philip II of Spain.

Doña Leonor de Mascareñas had a daughter from Jorge Pires de Figueiroa, Doña Maria de Morais de Mascarenhas, ancestor of Doña Josefa Maria de Mascarenhas Figueiroa Borges, baptized the 06-10-1698, the heir daughter of Manuel Borges Mascarenhas, Lord of Morgado do Souto, in Arrifana de Santa Maria (Vila da Feira), Portugal.

Father Jorge Pires de Figueiroa was the first rector of Souto. He was one of the private chaplains of Doña María de Aragón, [1] second wife of King Manuel I of Portugal. After the death of the King Manuel I, he entered the service of his daughter, the Infanta Isabel de Portugal, wife of Emperor Carlos V, and joined the entourage that accompanied her when she left for Castile in 1525.

Isabella of Portugal died very young and Father Jorge Pires de Figueiroa, having fulfilled his mission in the imperial court, returned to his country of origin, obtaining the service in the Parish of Souto, highly coveted at that time. He died in 1544.
