= Rosa María de las Nieves Ruiz de Castro y Centurión =

Rosa María de las Nieves Ruiz de Castro y Centurión (1691-1772), was a Spanish courtier. She was the Camarera mayor de Palacio to the queen of Spain, Barbara of Portugal in 1746–1760.

She was born to Salvador Ruiz de Castro and Francisca Josefa Centurión. In 1713 she married Pedro de Montcada, marquess of Leiva (d. 1716), and secondly to Guillem Ramón de Montcada, marquess of Aitona (d. 1727).

In 1735 she was appointed cambrera major to the crown princess, Barbara of Portugal. When Barbara became queen in 1746, she was promoted to Camarera mayor de Palacio. She kept her position under the next queen, Maria Amalia of Saxony, in 1759-1760.

She is claimed to have influenced the creation of the Royal Spanish Academy (1714) and the Royal Academy of History (1738). From about 1749 she was the salonniére of a famous literary salon called Academia del Buen Gusto, which was frequented by Agustín de Montiano, Ignacio de Luzán, Blas Nasarre, the marquis de Valdeflores, the count of Torrepalma, the duke of Béjar and the duke of Medina-Sidonia, as well as many talented noblewomen such as the marchioness of San Esteban, the duchess of Arcos, the marchioness of Estepa, who demonstrated talent in literature and the arts. She was a founding board member of the Junta de Damas de Honor y Mérito da Real Sociedad Económica Matritense.

Court offices
Preceded by Laura Castelví y Coloma	Camarera mayor de Palacio to the Queen of Spain; 1746–1760	Succeeded by Florentina de Pizarro Picolomino
