= Portrait of the Marchioness of Santa Cruz =

Painting by Francisco de Goya

- Retrato de la Marquesa de Santa Cruz (Spanish)
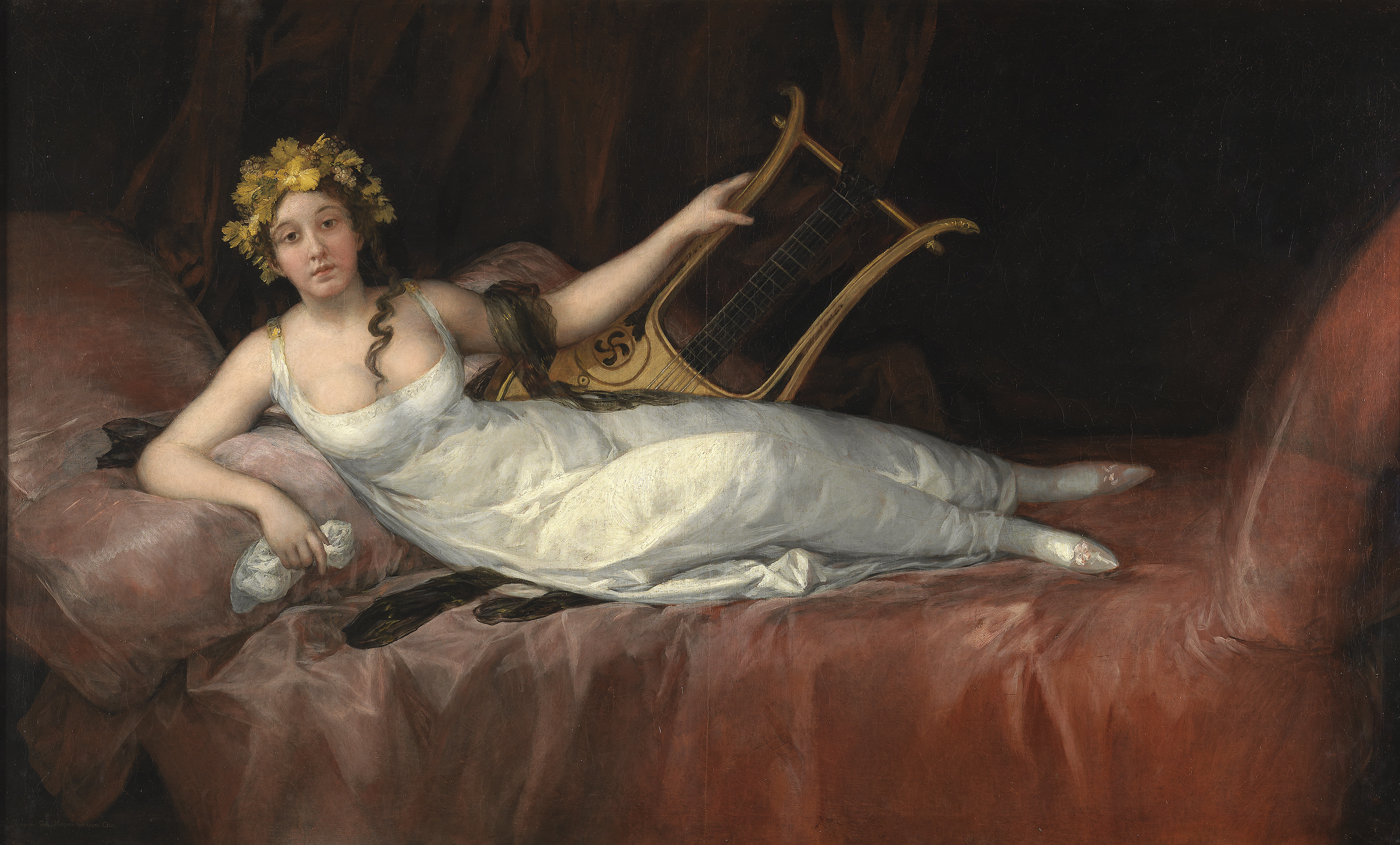
- Artist: Francisco Goya
- Year: 1805
- Medium: Oil on canvas
- Dimensions: 125 cm × 208 cm (49 in × 82 in)
- Location: Museo del Prado, Madrid

The Portrait of the Marchioness of Santa Cruz or Portrait of the Marquise of Santa Cruz is an 1805 portrait by the Spanish artist Francisco Goya, a family friend of the subject.

After being exported from Spain illegally in 1983, the Spanish government spent the following years trying to retrieve the painting. It was finally bought in 1986 for over $US6 million and brought to the Museo del Prado after legal negotiations. The case also caused the Spanish government to write a new law to better protect the nation's artistic heritage.

Another less detailed version of the painting was bought by Imelda Marcos in 1978 and confiscated by the Filipino government in 2014.

== Description ==
It shows Joaquina Téllez-Girón, Marquise of Santa Cruz clad in a very light white dress, lying sideways on a red divan. Her head is decorated with yellow flowers; her left hand is balancing a lyre-guitar. Her gaze does not directly fix on the viewer but seems to look distant. Her body does not seem to sit in a natural position, but seemingly floats on the red divan and the pillows.

The theme seems almost allegorical, a reference to the ancient Greek theatre. The composition of the work is similar to Antonio Canova's sculpture of Paolina Borghese as Venus Victrix. The portrait is also similar to Diego Velázquez and, to an extent, to Titian's depictions of Venus. The flowers on her head are a reference to Bacchus, while the lyre-guitar with its resemblance to the ancient lyre is a homage to art and Apollo.

This painting inspired one pastiche or fantasy portrait depicted in the comedy film Mortdecai (2015), starring Johnny Depp and Gwyneth Paltrow.

== See also ==
- List of works by Francisco Goya
