= Catalina de la Cerda =

Spanish courtier, wife of the I Duke of Lerma (c.1550–1603)

Doña Catalina de la Cerda, duchess of Lerma (1550-1603), was a Spanish courtier. She was the Camarera mayor de Palacio to the queen of Spain, in 1599–1603. She was married to the powerful royal favorite Francisco de Sandoval y Rojas, 1st Duke of Lerma.

== Life and career ==
She was born to Juan de la Cerda y Silva, 4th Duke of Medinaceli and Joana Manuel de Noronha. Prior to her marriage, she served as maid of honour to the queen, Anna of Austria.

In 1577 she married Francisco de Sandoval y Rojas, 1st Duke of Lerma.

She was appointed to the post of Camarera mayor de Palacio to the queen of Spain in 1599. She was appointed to the office with the task of supervising the queen and the queen's household on behalf of the king and the Duke of Lerma, her husband. The queen was aware of this, which made their relationship tense. It has been theorised that this was the reason why the Duchess of Lerma suffered from bouts of depression and therefore often retired from service. In 1603, she retired due to health reasons, and died later that same year.

Court offices
| Preceded by Francisca de Rojas y Sandoval | Camarera mayor de Palacio to the Queen of Spain; 1599–1603 | Succeeded by Catalina de Sandoval |
