= Maria Josefa Contreras y Vargas Machuca =

Doña Maria Josefa Contreras y Vargas Machuca, Countess of Alcudia (1756-1826), was a Spanish courtier. She was the Camarera mayor de Palacio to the queen of Spain, Maria Josepha Amalia of Saxony, in 1819–1823.

She was born to Pedro Pablo Valentín de Contreras y Muñoz de Gadea, V conde de Alcudia y IV vizconde de Santa Clara, and Tomasa de Vargas-Machuca y Maldonado, IV marquesa de Campo Fuerte.

She married in 1780 to Manuel Isidoro de Aguilera y Galarza, Marqués de Cerralbo.

She was appointed to the post of Camarera mayor de Palacio to queen in 1819.

Court offices
Preceded by Antonia Fernández	Camarera mayor de Palacio to the Queen of Spain; 1819–1823	Succeeded by Rosa María de Carvajal
