= María Pascuala Caro Sureda =

Spanish philosopher (1768–1827)

María Pascuala Caro Sureda (7 July 1768 – 12 December 1827), was the second woman Doctor of Philosophy in Spain.

She was born to the marqués de La Romana, Pere Caro Fontes, and Margalida Sureda de Togores. She was given a high education and taught Latin, which was not usual for women, and her mother arranged for all her children to be given a formal education. She was allowed to study at the University of Valencia, which was highly unusual for a woman, and was even allowed to graduate: she became a Doctor of Philosophy at the University of Valencia in 1779, as the second of her sex in Spain, and published her work in physics and mathematics, Ensayo de Historia, Física y Matemáticas, in 1781.

She is described as simple, humble and beautiful. In 1789, she entered the Santa Catalina de Siena Dominican convent in Palma de Mallorca, where she became prioress. During her life in the convent, she became known for her religious mystic poems.

== See also ==
- María Isidra de Guzmán y de la Cerda
- María Andrea Casamayor
