= Ángela Foch de Aragón =

Ángela Foch de Aragón, Dowager Countess of Altamira, Grandee of Spain (1666-1737), was a Spanish courtier. She was the Camarera mayor de Palacio to the queen of Spain, Elisabeth Farnese in 1714–1737.

She was born to Luis de Aragón y Fernández de Córdoba, VII. duke of Cardona, and María de Benavides, duchess of Cardona. She married to Luis de Moscoso Osorio Mesía de Guzmán Mendoza y Rojas, VIII. count of Altamira (1657–1698).

She was appointed Camarera mayor de Palacio in succession to Marie Anne de La Trémoille, princesse des Ursins. She was described:

"She was small and ugly, and at sixty might be taken for seventy-five. Yet, notwithstanding her bad figure, she had a dignified and imposing presence. She ruled the ladies of the household with a courteous absolutism, which none ever dared to question."

Court offices
Preceded by The princesse des Ursins	Camarera mayor de Palacio to the Queen of Spain; 1714–1737	Succeeded by Laura Castelví y Coloma
