= Juana de Armendáriz =

Spanish lady-in-waiting

Doña Juana Francisca Díez de Aux y Armendáriz y Afán de Ribera, Duchess of Alburquerque (1622–1696), was a Spanish courtier. She was the Camarera mayor de Palacio to the queen of Spain, in 1680–1696.

== Life and career ==
She was born to Lope Diez de Armendáriz, 1.Marqués de Cadreita and Antonia de Sandoval y Ribera. She married in 1645 to Francisco Fernández de la Cueva y Enríquez de Cabrera (1619–1676).

She served as menina (maid of honour) to the queen in 1630–1645, prior to her marriage. She was appointed to the post of Camarera mayor de Palacio in 1680.

She was appointed to replace the Duchess of Terranova, who had been discharged because of her strict enforcement of the Spanish court protocol upon the unwilling French queen, Marie Louise of Orleans. It was therefore clear the French-born queen did not wish to follow Spanish protocol and did not want it forced upon her by her Camarera mayor de Palacio, who normally had the task to teach and enforce the rules of protocol.

The Duchess of Albuquerque adjusted to the queen's wishes and is noted to have allowed queen Marie Louise to break etiquette in a number of ways: she allowed her to ignore protocol, amuse herself in many ways not otherwise seen as suitable, ride and meet Frenchmen, all allow her nurse Madame Quantin gather beggars below her window who the queen spoke directly to, all of which caused scandals with the Spanish public. It was her task to manoeuver the conflicts caused by the scandals, as well as the depressive mood of Marie Louise, who frequently worried that she was going to be poisoned.

Marie Louise died in 1689. The king quickly remarried to Maria Anna of Neuburg, and the Duchess of Albuquerque was confirmed in the same position for the next queen. She followed the same policy in her service to the new queen, showing tolerance toward queen Mariana's breaks against protocol and the involvement of the queen's favorites such as the countess Berlepsch in state affais without protests.

She died in office 15 September 1696.

Court offices
| Preceded by Juana de Aragón y Cortés | Camarera mayor de Palacio to the Queen of Spain; 1680–1696 | Succeeded by María Teresa de Benavides |
