= Ippolito Lante Montefeltro della Rovere =

Italian nobleman

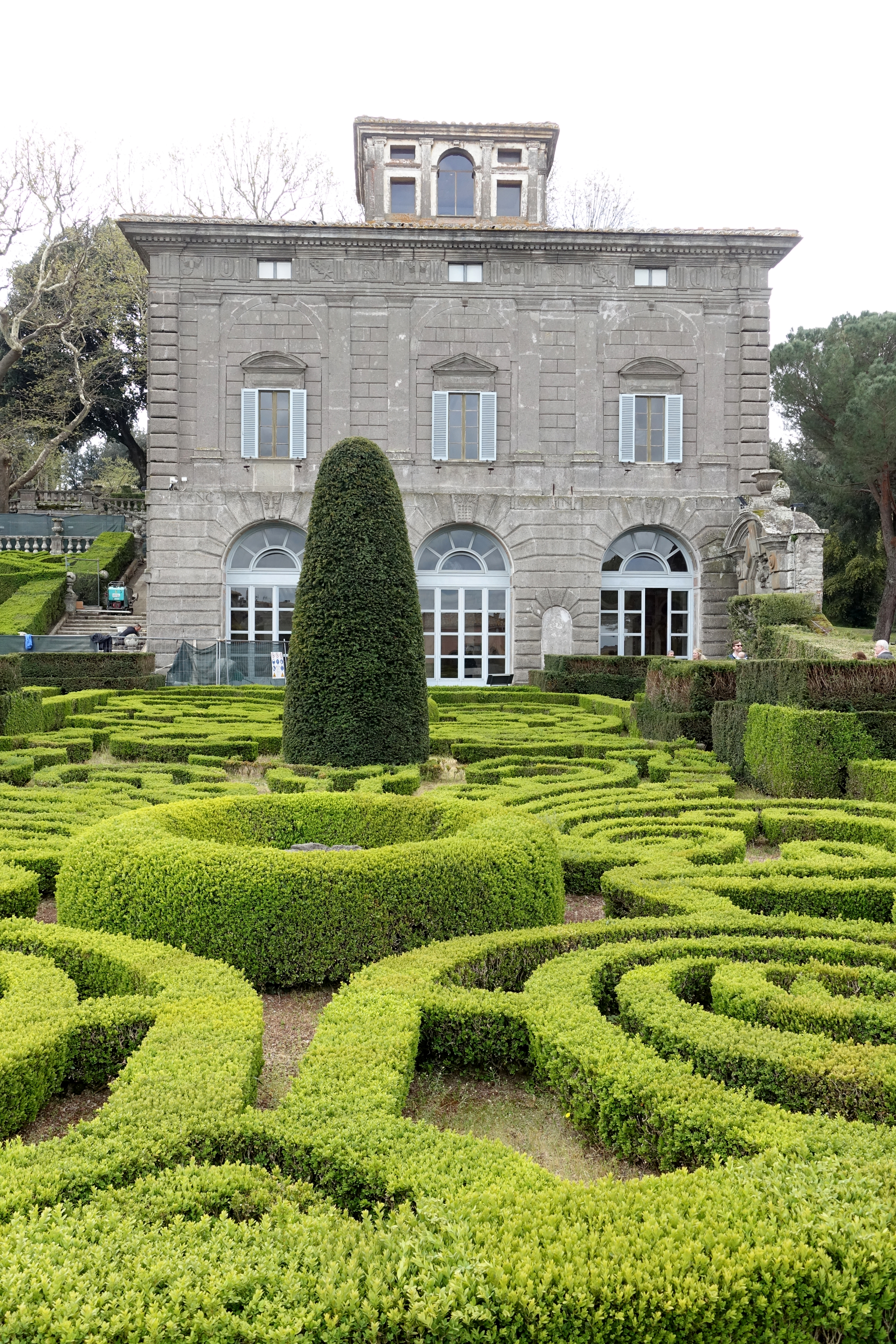
Gardens of the Villa Lante, the estate of Ippolito Lante Montefeltro della Rovere.

Ippolito Lante Montefeltro della Rovere (15 June 1618 – 29 June 1688) was an Italian nobleman and Duke of Bomarzo.

== Early life ==
Lante was the son of Marcantonio Lante (1566–1643) and his wife Lucrezia della Rovere. He was nephew to his father's brother, Cardinal Marcello Lante della Rovere. His brother, Lodovico Lante, married Olimpia Cesi, daughter of Federico Cesi, Duke of Acquasparta.

== Career ==
He purchased the Villa at Bagnaia and it became known as the Villa Lante. He made a number of significant improvements to the Villa and its gardens, and commissioned Pietro da Cortona to paint the Allegory of War and Peace. Many of Cortona's previous commissions had come from the Barberini family including Pope Urban VIII and Francesco Barberini. Lante later became close to Francesco's nephew, Maffeo Barberini (Prince of Palestrina) who spent some time in residence at the Villa Lante.

Lante's plan had been to alter the villa with more baroque art and architecture to move the estate away from the defensive military style with which it had first been built. Some of his initial plans were accomplished, but the buildings remain a mix of architectural types.

He also owned the Villa Lante al Gianicolo in Rome.

== Personal life ==
On 11 February 1688, he married Maria Cristina d'Altemps, daughter of Pietro d'Altemps (Duke of Gallese and Marquess of Soriano) and Angelica de' Medici (granddaughter of Giulio de' Medici). They had four children:

- Antonio Lante Montefeltro della Rovere, (1648–1716) who inherited his father's titles and married Louise Angelique Charlotte de La Trémouille, sister of Marie Anne de La Trémoille, both daughters of Louis II de La Trémoille.
- Marcello Lante Montefeltro della Rovere (born 1652)
- Luigi Lante Montefeltro della Rovere (born 1653)
- Lavinia Lante Montefeltro della Rovere (born 1655)
- Angela Lante Montefeltro della Rovere (born 1658)

Lante died on 29 June 1688 in Rome.
