= Elvira Ponce de León y Álvarez de Toledo =

Spanish courtier

Elvira Ponce de León y Álvarez de Toledo, Duchess of Gandía (1601-1691), was a Spanish courtier. She was the Camarera mayor de Palacio to the queen of Spain, Mariana of Austria, in 1654–1691.

== Early life ==
She was born to Luis Ponce de León y Zúñiga, 5th marquis of Zahara, and Victoria Álvarez de Toledo y Colon. She married Fadrique de Toledo y Osorio, 1st marquis of Villanueva de la Valdueza.

== Career ==
She was appointed to the post of Camarera mayor de Palacio to Queen Mariana in 1654, and kept the position during Mariana's tenure as queen consort, queen regent, and queen dowager.

Elvira Ponce de León's position gave her a guarantee to closeness with the queen regent, who was the source of grants, privileges and political power in the absence of a capable king of legal age. The fact that she not only had access but also the confidence of the queen regent made her a target of courtiers, ministers and supplicants who wished to gain access, favors and the ear of the regent through her. She was pointed out as an ally of Juan Everardo Nithard and a member of the Pro-Austrian Party at court, and regularly attended meetings with the Imperial Amassador Count Pötting. These meetings took place in the room of the chamberlain, and were also attended by the sisters Casilda and Francisca Manrique and Leonor de Velasco.

Court offices
Preceded by Ana de Cardona y Aragón	Camarera mayor de Palacio to the Queen of Spain; 1654–1665	Succeeded by Juana de Aragón y Cortés
