= María de la Encarnación Álvarez de Toledo y Gonzaga =

Doña María de la Encarnación Álvarez de Toledo y Gonzaga, marquesa de Móndejar (1755-1821), was a Spanish courtier. She was the Camarera mayor de Palacio to the queen of Spain, Maria Isabel of Portugal, in 1816–1818.

She was born to Antonio Álvarez de Toledo y Pérez de Guzmán, and Maria Antonia Dorotea Gonzaga.

She married in 1774 to Juan de la Cruz Belvis de Moncada y Pizarro.

She was appointed to the post of Camarera mayor de Palacio to queen in 1814.

Court offices
Preceded by María Isidra de la Cerda	Camarera mayor de Palacio to the Queen of Spain; 1814–1816	Succeeded by Antonia Fernández de Cordoba
