= Juana de Vega =

Spanish writer (1805-1872)

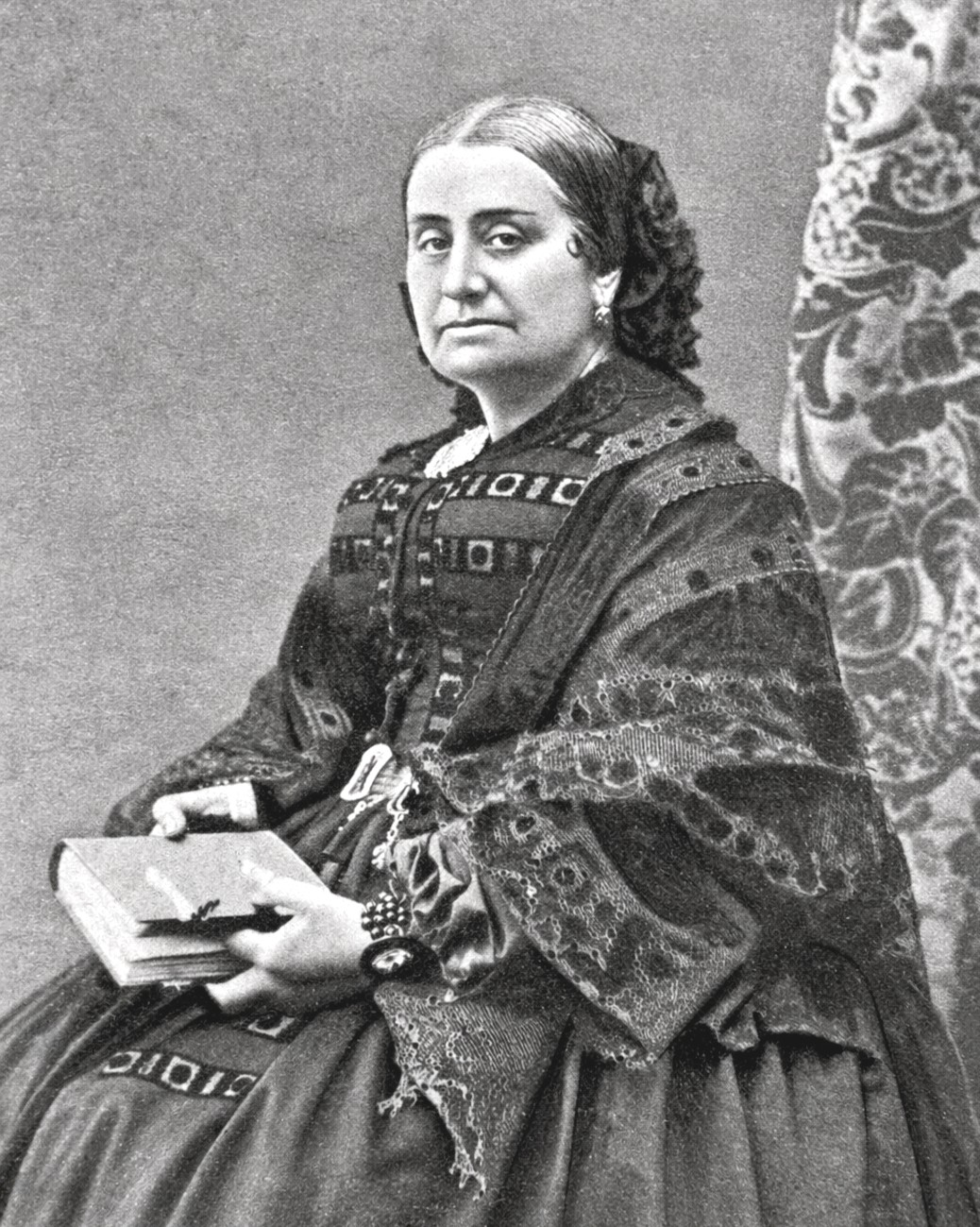

Juana María de la Vega, countess de Espoz y Mina (1805-1872), was a Spanish writer, liberal activist and courtier. She was the Aya de los Infantes and Camarera mayor de Palacio to the queen of Spain, Isabella II of Spain in 1841–1843.

She was married to Francisco Espoz y Mina and known for her memoirs, novels and liberal activism. Her memoirs, Memorias de la condesa de Espoz y Mina, describe the life at the court of Isabella II during her minority.
