= Laura Castelví y Coloma =

Laura Castelví y Coloma, Marchioness of Torrecuso (1678-1760), was a Spanish courtier. She was the Camarera mayor de Palacio to the queen of Spain, Elisabeth Farnese in 1737–1746.

She was born to José de Castellví y Alagón, 1st marquis de Villatorcas, and Guiomar Coloma y Borja. She married in 1705 to Nicolás Antonio Caracciolo, marquis de Torrecuso, duke of San Jorge and prince of Champaña.

She participated in court life most of her life: she was menina (maid of honour) at court in 1687, and appointed Camarera mayor de Palacio in 1737 to the queen, Elisabeth Farnese. When Elisabeth Farnese became a widow in 1746, she chose to remain camarera mayor to the now queen dowager instead of seving the new queen, and served Elisabeth until her death. She is known for obtaining a number of favors for her relatives and protegees during her tenure at court.

Court offices
Preceded by Ángela Foch de Aragón	Camarera mayor de Palacio to the Queen of Spain; 1737–1746	Succeeded by Rosa María de las Nieves
