= Catalina de Sandoval =

Doña Catalina de Sandoval, countess of Lemos (1555–1620), was a Spanish courtier. She was the Camarera mayor de Palacio to the queen of Spain, in 1603–1620.

== Life and career ==
She was born to Francisco Gómez de Sandoval y Zúñiga and Isabel de Borja y Castro. In 1575, she married Francisco Fernández de Castro, count of Lemos. She was the sister of the powerful royal favorite Francisco de Sandoval y Rojas, 1st Duke of Lerma.

She served as lady-in-waiting to the queen, Margaret of Austria, before she was appointed to the post of Camarera mayor de Palacio in 1603. She kept the position after the death of queen Margaret in 1611. She was confirmed in her position to the new queen, Elisabeth of France, and welcomed her to Spain in 1615.

She was described as a person of strong character, capable to exert influence over her brother. She is noted to have voiced her opinions to him, such as with the famous occasion in which she criticised him for the abuse committed by Franqueza and Calderón. She kept her position at court until her death in 1620.

Court offices
Preceded by Catalina de la Cerda	Camarera mayor de Palacio to the Queen of Spain; 1603–1620	Succeeded by Juana Enriquez de Velasco
