= María de la O Guiráldez y Cañas =

Spanish courtier (1797–1867)

María de la O Guiráldez y Cañas, Duchess of Gor, Grandee of Spain (1797-1867), was a Spanish courtier. She was the Camarera mayor de Palacio to the queen of Spain, Isabella II of Spain in 1848–1854 and 1866–1867.

María de la O Giráldez y Cañas was born to Jaime Giráldez y Mendoza, VII count of Valoria and count of Lérida (d. 1803), and María Cañas y Portocarrero. She was the heiress of her father's titles.

In 1818 she married Nicolás Álvarez de las Asturias-Bohórques y Chacón, II Duke of Gor.

In 1848 she was appointed Camarera mayor de Palacio to the queen. She was one of the courtiers who was fired on the request of the government after the revolution of 1854. She was a favorite of the queen, who reappointed her to her former position as camarera mayor de palacio in 1866.

Court offices
Preceded by María Manuela Kirkpatrick	Camarera mayor de Palacio to the Queen of Spain; 1848–1854	Succeeded by Rosalía Ventimiglia y Moncada
Preceded by Rosalía Ventimiglia y Moncada	Camarera mayor de Palacio to the Queen of Spain; 1866–1867	Succeeded by María del Carmen Álvarez
