= Juana Enriquez de Velasco =

Doña Juana Enriquez de Velasco, duchess of Gandía (1550-1627), was a Spanish courtier. She was the Camarera mayor de Palacio to the queen of Spain, in 1621–1627.

== Life and career ==
She was born to Íñigo Fernández de Velasco y Tovar (1520–1585), IV Duke of Frías and V/X condestable of Castile, and Ana Ángela de Guzmán y Aragón. In 1572 she married Francisco Tomás de Borja y Centelles (1551–1595), VI Duke of Gandía.

She belonged to a very well connected court family. She had the confidence of king Philip II, and was appointed to the post of Camarera mayor de Palacio to the queen of Spain for the first time in 1588. This was an appointment avaiting a future queen, since there was in fact no queen of Spain at the time; but she nominally kept the title in 1588-1599, and it was the understanding that she would serve as soon as Spain had its next queen. When Spain got its next queen, Margaret of Austria in 1598, however, she never got to fill the position, since she belonged to one of the many officials of the royal court to be dismissed by the new king. She retired from the court entirely after this. In 1621, however, when the office became vacant, she was recalled to court and reapointed to the post. She served until her death in 1627.

Court offices
Preceded by Catalina de Sandoval	Camarera mayor de Palacio to the Queen of Spain; 1621–1627	Succeeded by Inés de Zúñiga y Velasco
