= Ana de Cardona y Aragón =

Spanish courtier

Doña Ana de Cardona y Aragón, countess de Medellín (1587–1653), was a Spanish courtier. She was the Camarera mayor de Palacio to the queen of Spain, in 1649–1653.

== Life and career ==
She was born to Luis Ramón de Aragón Folch de Cardona y Córdoba (or Luis de Córdoba y Aragón), and Ana Enríquez de Cabrera y Mendoza. She married in 1607 to Pedro Portocarrero y Córdoba, 5th count of Medellín.

She served as camarera to the infanta María Teresa of Spain between 1644 and 1649. She was appointed to the post of Camarera mayor de Palacio to the queen of Spain in 1649. She served until her death in 1653.

Court offices
Preceded by Inés de Zúñiga y Velasco	Camarera mayor de Palacio to the Queen of Spain; 1649–1653	Succeeded by Elvira Ponce de León
