= Camarera mayor de Palacio =

Spanish court official

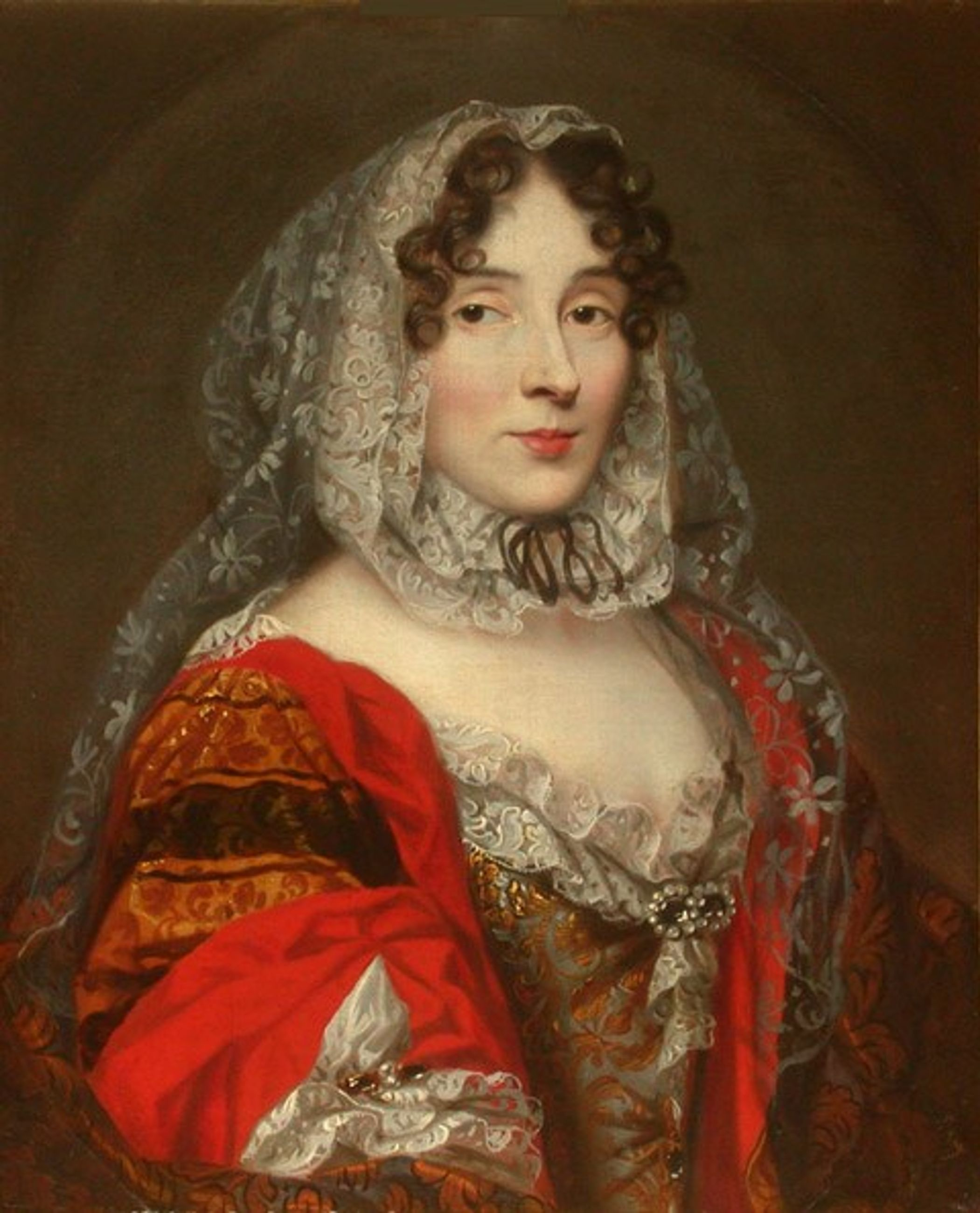
Marie-Anne, later the princesse des Ursins

The Camarera mayor de Palacio (First Lady of the Bedchamber) was a court official of the Royal Household and Heritage of the Crown of Spain, who was in charge of the person and the rooms of the Queen of Spain.

== Historical precedents and regime during the 17th and 18th centuries ==
This office was created in 1526 when, during the Habsburg dynasty, the Royal Court was shaped after the Court of Burgundy. Charles V, Holy Roman Emperor, but also King of Spain, imported the etiquette styled in the court of his paternal grandmother Mary of Burgundy and appointed the first “Camarera mayor de Palacio” to his wife, the Empress.

The principal responsibility of the “Camarera mayor de Palacio” was managing all that was related with service to the Queen; she had authority over the different dignities and servants that composed her personnel. Her first obligation was the personal assistance to the Sovereign. She had to accompany her at all times, to the point of sleeping in her chamber, when the King was not. She was in charge of the clothes purveyors and directed the formal dressing of the Queen. In fact, she had the high duty of delivering the Queen water and a towel during morning toilette. All these functions gave the “Camarera mayor” a great intimacy with the Queen, as well as a big influence over her.

== Regime during the 19th and 20th centuries ==
In the structure of the Royal Household, the Office “Camarera mayor de Palacio” had the same category as that of the Mayordomo mayor. Only a woman with the rank of Grandee of Spain could be nominated for this Office, and she was chosen between those of the class of “Dama de la Reina” (Lady of the Bedchamber) of major seniority. She was in charge of everything relative to the etiquette and organization of the Household of the Queen helped by the “Mayordomo mayor” (High Steward) to the Queen.

Among her duties were signalling the dates for audiences to the Queen and accompanying her at every ceremony.

Under the “Camarera mayor de Palacio” there were the “Damas de la Reina” (Ladies of the Bedchamber) and the “Damas al servicio particular de la Reina” (Ladies-in-Waiting).

She was assigned an annual salary of 6,000 pesetas and had her own private office in the Royal Palace of Madrid.

She was styled “Excelentísima señora Camarera mayor de Palacio”.

This post was suppressed after the proclamation of the Second Spanish Republic in 1931 and never re-created after the restoration of Monarchy in 1975.

== List of camareras mayores to the queen of Spain, 1526–1931 ==
=== Isabella of Portugal, 1526–1539 ===
- 1526–1546: Leonor de Castro y Meneses, Duchess of Gandía, Grandee of Spain

=== Anna of Austria, 1570–1580 ===
- 1570–1571: Aldonza de Bazán, Marchioness of Fromista, Grandee of Spain
- 1571–1576: María Ángela de Aragón y Guzmán, Marchioness of Berlanga, Grandee of Spain
- 1576–1580: Francisca de Rojas y Sandoval, Countess of Paredes de Nava, Grandee of Spain

=== Margaret of Austria, 1601–1611 ===
- 1601–1603: Catalina de la Cerda, Duchess of Lerma, Grandee of Spain
- 1603–1611: Catalina de Sandoval, Countess of Lemos, Grandee of Spain

=== Elisabeth of France, 1615–1644 ===
- 1615–1621: Catalina de Sandoval, Countess of Lemos, Grandee of Spain
- 1621–1627: Juana Enriquez de Velasco, Duchess of Gandía, Grandee of Spain
- 1627–1643: Inés de Zúñiga, Countess of Olivares, Grandee of Spain

=== Mariana of Austria, 1649–1665 ===
- 1649–1653: Ana de Cardona y Aragón, Countess of Medellín, Grandee of Spain
- 1654–1665: Elvira Ponce de León, Marchioness of Villanueva de Valdueza
- 1660: Margarita Zapata de Mendoza, Countess of Priego, Grandee of Spain. Appointed to serve as camarera to Maria Theresa of Spain prior to her departure to France, when she was given the status of queen of France at the Spanish court appending her marriage to Louis XIV.

=== Marie Louise of Orléans, 1679–1689 ===
- 1679–1680: Juana de Aragón y Cortés, Duchess of Terranova, Grandee of Spain
- 1680–1689: Juana de Armendáriz, Duchess dowager of Alburquerque, Grandee of Spain

=== Maria Anna of Neuburg, 1689–1700 ===
- 1689–1696: Juana de Armendáriz, Duchess dowager of Alburquerque, Grandee of Spain
- 1696–1700: María Teresa de Benavides, Duchess of Frías, Grandee of Spain

=== Maria Luisa of Savoy, 1702–1714 ===
- 1702–1704: Marie Anne de La Trémoille, princesse des Ursins
- 1704–1706: María Alberta de Castro, Duchess of Béjar, Grandee of Spain
- 1706–1714: Marie Anne de La Trémoille, princesse des Ursins

=== Elisabeth Farnese, 1714–1724 ===
- 1714–1724: Ángela Foch de Aragón, Countess dowager of Altamira, Grandee of Spain

=== Louise Élisabeth of Orléans, 1724 ===
- 1724: Ángela Foch de Aragón, Dowager Countess of Altamira, Grandee of Spain

=== Elisabeth Farnese, 1724–1746 ===
- 1724–1737: Ángela Foch de Aragón, Dowager Countess of Altamira, Grandee of Spain
- 1737–1746: Laura Castelví y Coloma, Marchioness dowager of Torrecuso

=== Barbara of Portugal, 1746–1758 ===
- 1746–1758: Rosa María de Castro, Marchioness of Aytona, Grandee of Spain

=== Maria Amalia of Saxony, 1759–1760 ===
- 1759–1760: Rosa María de Castro, Marchioness of Aytona, Grandee of Spain

=== Maria Luisa of Parma, 1788–1808 ===
- 1788–1793: Florentina de Pizarro Picolomino, Marchioness dowager of Bélgida, Grandee of Spain
- 1793–1808: María Isidra de la Cerda y Guzmán, Duchess of Nájera, Grandee of Spain

=== Maria Isabel of Portugal, 1814–1818 ===
- 1814–1816: María de la Encarnación Álvarez de Toledo y Gonzaga, marquesa de Móndejar
- 1816–1818: Antonia Fernández de Cordoba Sarmiento, Countess of la Puebla del Maestre, Grandee of Spain

=== Maria Josepha Amalia of Saxony, 1818-1829 ===
- 1819–1823: Maria Josefa Contreras y Vargas Machuca, Countess of Alcudia, Grandee of Spain
- 1823–1829: Rosa María de Carvajal Manrique de Lara, Dowager Marchioness of Bedmar, Grandee of Spain

=== Maria Cristina of the Two Sicilies, 1829–1833 ===
- 1829–1834: Rosa María de Carvajal Manrique de Lara, Dowager Marchioness of Bedmar, Grandee of Spain

=== Isabella II, 1833–1868 ===
- 1834–1841: Joaquina María del Pilar Téllez-Girón y Alfonso Pimentel, Marchioness of Santa Cruz de Mudela, Grandee of Spain
- 1841–1842: Luisa Álvarez de las Asturias Bohórquez y Guiráldez, Marchioness of Bélgida, Grandee of Spain
- 1842–1843: Juana de Vega, Countess of Espoz y Mina
- 1843–1847: Joaquina María del Pilar Téllez-Girón y Alfonso Pimentel, Marchioness of Santa Cruz de Mudela, Grandee of Spain
- 1847–1848: María Manuela Kirpatrick de Closeburn, Countess dowager of Montijo, Grandee of Spain
- 1848–1854: María de la O Guiráldez y Cañas, Duchess of Gor, Grandee of Spain
- 1855–1866: Rosalía Ventimiglia y Moncada d'Aragona, Duchess dowager of Berwick and Alba, Grandee of Spain
- 1866–1867: María de la O Guiráldez y Cañas, Duchess of Gor, Grandee of Spain
- 1867–1868: María de la Encarnación Álvarez de las Asturias Bohórquez y Guiráldez, Marchioness of Novaliches, Grandee of Spain

=== Mercedes of Orléans, 1878 ===
- 1878–1878: María de la Encarnación Fernández de Córdoba y Álvarez de las Asturias Bohorques, Marchioness of Santa Cruz de Mudela, Grandee of Spain

=== Maria Cristina of Austria, 1879–1906 ===
==== 1879–1906 ====
- 1879–1884: María de la Encarnación Fernández de Córdoba y Álvarez de las Asturias Bohorques, Marchioness of Santa Cruz de Mudela, Grandee of Spain
- 1884–1888: María Eulalia Osorio de Moscoso y Carvajal, Duchess of Medina de las Torres, Grandee of Spain
- 1888–1905: María Soledad Fernández de Córdoba y Alagón, Countess of Sástago, Grandee of Spain
- 1905–1906: María Luisa Cárvajal y Dávalos, Duchess of San Carlos, Marchioness widower of Santa Cruz de Mudela, Grandee of Spain

==== 1906–1929 ====
During the reign of King Alfonso XIII, and after his marriage, the separate Household of his mother the Queen Maria Cristina of Austria was created, with her own “Camarera mayor de la Reina Madre” (First Lady of the Bedchamber of the Queen Mother). This office was successively held by:

- 1906–1923: Maria Natividad Quindos Villaroel, Duchess of La Conquista, Marchioness of San Saturnino, Grandee of Spain
- 1923–1929: Maria Concepcion Martos Zabalburu, Countess of Heredia Spinola, Grandee of Spain

=== Victoria Eugenie of Battenberg, 1906–1931 ===
- 1906–1931: María Luisa Cárvajal y Dávalos, Duchess of San Carlos, Marchioness widower of Santa Cruz de Mudela, Grandee of Spain

== See also ==
- Chief Court Mistress, Dutch, German, Scandinavian and Russian equivalent
- Mistress of the Robes, British equivalent
- Première dame d'honneur, French equivalent
- Surintendante de la Maison de la Reine, French equivalent
