= Jean Baptiste de Croÿ, 5th Duke of Havré =

Family shield of the Dukes of Havré

Jean Baptiste François de Croÿ, 5th Duke of Havré (1686–1727) was a French nobleman of the House of Croÿ and the 5th Duke of Havré.

== Lineage and Family ==
Croÿ was the son of Ferdinand Francois Joseph de Croÿ, 3rd Duke of Havré. His brother Charles Antoine Joseph, the 4th Duke of Havré, was killed during the Battle of Saragossa in 1710 and Croÿ succeeded him as Duke. His sister, Marie Therese Josephe married Landgrave Philip of Hesse-Darmstadt.

Croÿ married Marie Anne Césarine Lante Montefeltro della Rovere, of the House of della Rovere; the daughter of Antonio Lante Montefeltro della Rovere. This line of the House of Croÿ came to an end in 1839, when the 7th Duke of Havré and Croÿ died in Paris aged 95, having outlived all of his sons.
