= Aya de los Infantes =

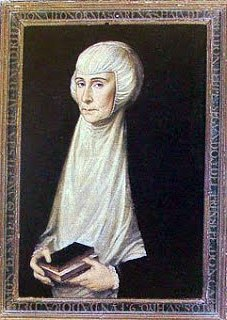
Leonor de Mascarenhas, Aya de los Infantes of king Philip II

Aya, formally often called either Aya de los Infantes ('Governess of the Princes') or Aya de las Infantas ('Governess of the Princesses'), but normally referred to as just Aya, was an office at the Spanish Royal Court. It was the title of the governess of the royal children.

== History ==
The head Aya de los Infantes was the formal head of the household of a royal child and the rest of the staff of the child. The office developed during the middle ages and took its final form in the 16th century. It lasted until the abolition of the monarchy in 1931.

The Aya was normally a widow of titled nobility and good reputation. She was to live with the royal child (who was normally brought up separately from the parents) and supervise that the chld was raised in accordance with the instructions of the parents, and treated in accordance with royal protocol. She was also the supervisor of the staff of the royal nursery. The head Aya, or the Aya de los Infantes, was the head and the first of rank of the nursery: followed by the Tenienta de Aya, also a noblewoman, who was her deputy and had the status of Señora de Honor; the 3rd rank Azafata, also a noblewoman, who was responsible for the personal possessions of the child, such as clothing, jewlery, toys and other items; the 4th rank Camarista, responsible for the dressing and undressing of the child; the 5th rank Moza de retrete, who was not a noblewoman and who did not have the status of a lady-in-waiting, but a commoner and nurse responsible for the physical tasks tending to the child, such as the bathing and hygiene of the child; the 6th rank Lavandera (washerwoman); Ama de cría/nodriza (wet nurse); and the ama de repuesto (deputy wet nurse).

A Prince was normally transferred to male staff about the age of five, and given a staff of men with equivalent positions: ayo (male aya or governor); teniente del ayo (deputy); gentilhombre de cámara; mayordomo; ayudas de cámara; mozos de retrete; and capellán, which was the same position as the female staff translated to male titles. A Princess were able to keep her female staff in a larger degree. She often kept her nursery staff until she married a foreign prince and left the country; as an adult, her staff was expanded with lades-in-waitings, and some of the titles of her existent staff was transformed to other titles, such as her governess being named her head lady-in-waiting, her nurse being named her lady's maid, and similar.

== Outside of Spain ==
The office of Aya also existed in Austria, which imported many of the Spanish court offices, as well as in Portugal, where it was spelled Aia.

== See also ==
- Governess of the Children of France
