= Marie Anne de La Trémoille, princesse des Ursins =

French courtier and favourite (1642–1722)

Marie Anne de La Trémoille
- Princesse des Ursins
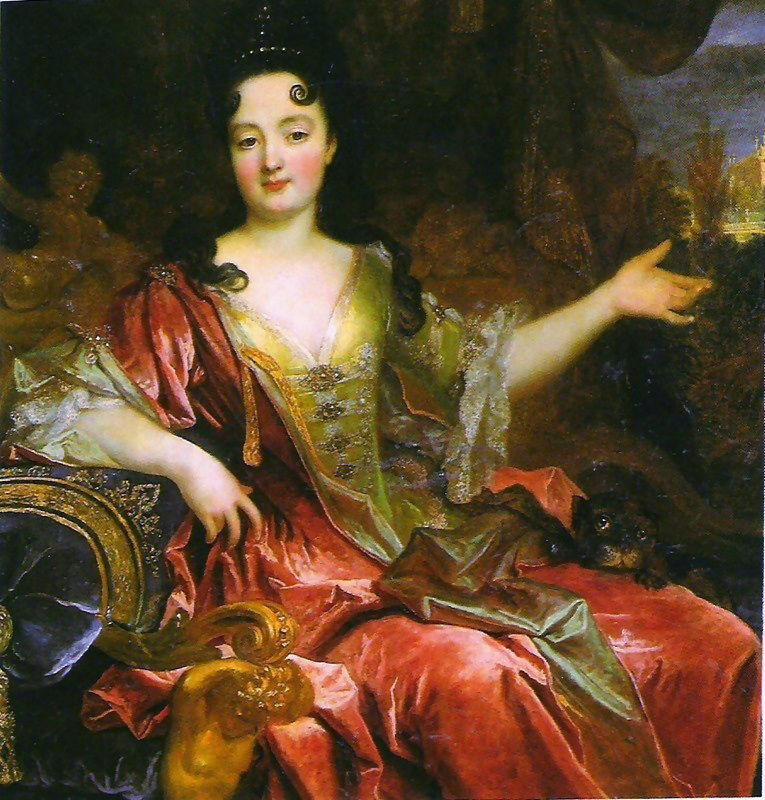
- Marie Anne de La Trémoille, Duchess di Bracciano, attributed to Nicolas de Largillière
- Born: 1642; Paris, France
- Died: 5 December 1722 (aged 80); Rome, Italy
- Buried: Saint Jean de Latran, Rome
- Spouses: Adrien Blaise de Talleyrand, Prince de Chalais; Flavio Orsini, Duke di Bracciano
- Father: Louis II de La Trémoille
- Mother: Renée Aubery
- Occupation: Courtier

Marie Anne de La Trémoille, princesse des Ursins (1642 – 5 December 1722), was a French courtier and royal favourite known for her political influence, being a de facto ruler of Spain from 1701 until 1714. She spent most of her life as an agent of French influence abroad, at first in Rome, and then in Spain under the new Bourbon dynasty, followed by a final period at the exiled Stuart court in Rome. She played a central role in the Spanish royal court during the first years of the reign of Philip V, until she was ousted from the country following a power struggle with the new queen consort, Elisabeth Farnese.

== Life and family ==
She was the daughter of Louis II de La Trémoille, Duke of Noirmoutier, and his wife Renée Julie Aubery de Tilleport. She belonged to a cadet branch of the La Trémoille family, which held the exalted rank of prince étranger in France. She was married young to Adrien Blaise de Talleyrand, Prince de Chalais. Her husband, having been implicated in the duel of four against four, in which Pierre de Beauvilliers, son of the Duc de Saint-Aignan, was killed in 1663, was compelled to flee France. He died soon afterward in Spain, and Marie Anne, now widowed, established herself in Rome.

In 1675, she married Flavio Orsini, Duke di Bracciano (1620–1698). The marriage was far from harmonious, but her husband left her his fortune (popular imagination thought it to be huge, but in reality, the duke was almost bankrupt) and the leadership of the French party in Rome. It brought her a series of lawsuits and troubles with Livio Odescalchi, nephew of Pope Innocent XI, who claimed that he had been adopted by the duke. Eventually, the widow sold the title and estates to Odescalchi.

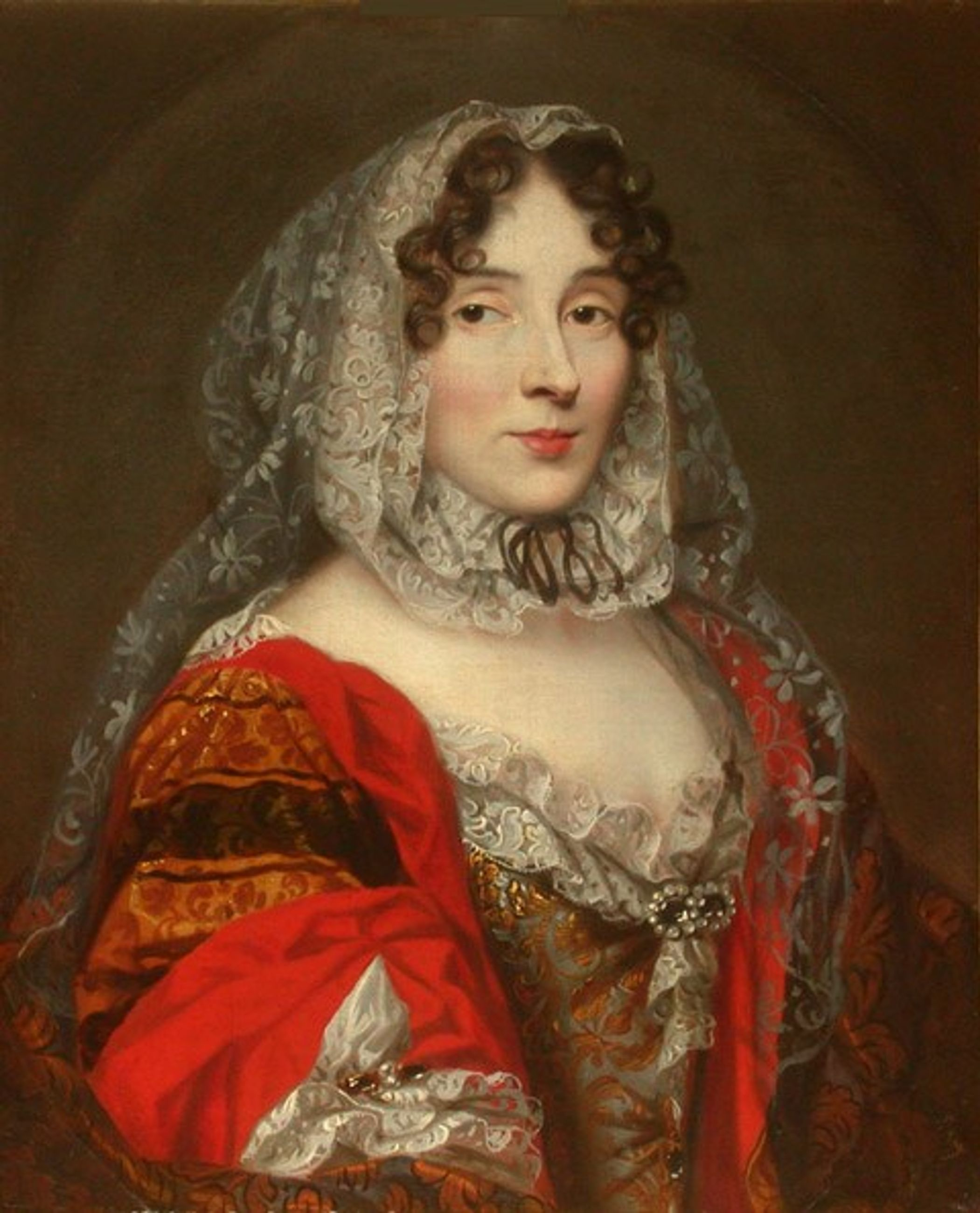
Marie Anne de La Trémoille

She then assumed the title Princesse des Ursins, a French translation of Orsini, and was tacitly allowed to use it, though it had no legal basis. She had indulged in much unofficial diplomacy at Rome, particularly with Neapolitans and Spaniards of rank, whom it was desirable to secure as French partisans in view of the approaching death of Charles II of Spain, and the plans of Louis XIV to place his family on the Spanish throne.

Her services in favour of France were rewarded in 1699 by a pension, which her problematic financial situation made necessary. When Philippe of France, Duke of Anjou, grandson of the French king, was declared heir by the will of Charles II, she took an active part in arranging his marriage with Princess Maria Luisa of Savoy, a daughter of Victor Amadeus II, Duke of Savoy. Her ambition was to secure the post of camarera mayor de palacio (head of the queen's household) to the young queen, a child of barely thirteen. By quiet diplomacy and with the help of Madame de Maintenon, she succeeded, and in 1701, she accompanied the young queen to Spain.

Until 1714, the year of the death of the queen, she was the most powerful person in the country. Her functions in relation to the king and queen were almost those of a nurse. Her letters show that she had to put them to bed at night, and get them up in the morning. She gives a most amusing description of her embarrassments when she had to enter the royal bedroom, laden with articles of clothing and furniture. But if the camarera mayor de palacio did the work of a domestic servant, it was for a serious political purpose. She was expected to look after French interests in the palace and to manage the Spanish nobles, many of whom were of the Austrian party, and who were generally opposed to foreign ways or to interference with the elaborate etiquette of the Spanish court.

Madame des Ursins was resolved not to be a mere agent of Versailles. During the first period of her tenure, she was in frequent conflict with the French ambassadors, who claimed the right to attend the privy council and to direct the government. Madame des Ursins urged that the young king should rely as much as possible on his Spanish subjects. In 1704, her enemies at the French court secured her recall, but she still had the support of Madame de Maintenon, and her own tact enabled her to placate Louis XIV.

=== Spain ===
In 1705, she returned to Spain with a free hand, and with what was practically the power to name her own ministry. During the worst times of the War of the Spanish Succession, she was the real head of the Bourbon party and was well aided by Princess Maria Luisa of Savoy, the spirited young queen of Philip V. She did not hesitate to quarrel even with so powerful a personage as Cardinal Luis de Portocarrero, Archbishop of Toledo, when he proved hostile. Yet she was so far from offending the pride of the nation that, when in 1709 Louis XIV, severely pressed by the other Great Powers, threatened or pretended to desert the cause of his grandson, she dismissed all Frenchmen from the court and threw the king on the support of the Castilians.

Her influence on the sovereigns was dominant until the death of the queen. Madame des Ursins confesses in her voluminous correspondence that she made herself a burden to the king in her anxiety to exclude from him all other influence, watching him as if he were a child. Philip was too weak to break the yoke himself and could insist only that he should be supplied with a wife. Madame des Ursins was persuaded by Alberoni to arrange a marriage with Elisabeth Farnese, hoping to govern the new queen as she had done the old.

However, Saint-Simon relates that the princess tried first to become queen of Spain herself and, when this plan failed, she persuaded Alberoni to choose a member of the House of Farnese, hoping that Elisabeth, who could not otherwise have hoped for a royal crown, would feel indebted to her. In trying to become queen, Madame des Ursins lost the last remnants of support from Madame de Maintenon; in promoting Elisabeth Farnese without French consent, she also lost Louis XIV's support.

Elisabeth Farnese managed to stipulate that she should be allowed to dismiss the camarera mayor. Madame des Ursins, who had gone to meet the new queen at Jadraque, was driven from her presence with insult and sent out of Spain without being allowed to change her court dress, in such bitter weather that the coachman lost his hand by frostbite. In Bayonne, she waited for a while hoping that the king would call her back, but in vain. Instead, Ángela Foch de Aragón was appointed to replace her as camarera mayor. Saint-Simon believes that the dismissal had been schemed beforehand, and even happened with the consent of the king. After a short stay in France, she went to Italy, eventually establishing herself in Rome, where she imposed her personality on the small émigré Jacobite court of "The Old Pretender", effectively running it until she died on 5 December 1722. She had the final satisfaction of meeting Alberoni there after his fall.

== Legacy ==
Madame des Ursins has the credit of having begun to check the overgrown power of the church and the Inquisition in Spain, and of having attempted to bring the finances to order.

In his Mémoires, Saint-Simon draws a devastating portrait of a scheming intrigant, her accomplices and minions, without crediting the important and sometimes positive role the princess played in getting and keeping the royal pair on the throne, and improving the poor finances of the kingdom of Spain (despite his harsh view of her political influence, Saint-Simon admits that he personally liked and admired her).

Madame des Ursins also is credited with having introduced the essence of bitter orange as a fashionable fragrance by using it to perfume her gloves and her bath. Since then, the name of Neroli (she was Princess of Nerola, in Lazio, Italy) has been used to describe this essence.

Court offices
Preceded by María Teresa de Benavides	Camarera mayor de Palacio to the Queen of Spain; 1702–1704	Succeeded by María Alberta de Castro
Preceded by María Alberta de Castro	Camarera mayor de Palacio to the Queen of Spain; 1706–1714	Succeeded by Ángela Foch de Aragón
