= Maasgau =

Early medieval region in portions of modern Belgium, Germany and Netherlands

The Maasgau, Masao, or Maasland, was an early medieval region or pagus, on both sides of the Meuse (Dutch: Maas), stretching north of the city of Maastricht.

In some periods there was also one or more counties (comitates) of this name.

== Attestations ==
According to Nonn's collection of attestations:

- In a letter of 633-56, from Bishop Paul of Verdun to Bishop Desiderius of Cahors the term "Masao" is used to describe a travel route of the Merovingian king Sigibert III, travelling via Maastricht from Laon to Cologne.
- In a charter of 714, Susteren is described as being in the "pagus Mosariorum".
- In a testament of 732/3 attributed to Adela of Pfalzel, a place called Scriptinas is described as being "in pago Mosao super ripam Mosae".
- In a charter of 741/2 which is reported in two versions in Sint-Truiden records, a "count or duke of Hasbania" (comes vel dux Hasbanie) named Robert, son of Lambert, granted lands near Diest to Sint-Truiden Abbey. In the charter itself this Robert called himself a count, but he was mentioned as a Duke in the biography (Vita) of Bishop Eucherius of Orléans. In surviving versions of that Vita, when Charles Martel exiled Eucherius to Cologne this was under the custody of a Duke Robert of Hasbania (Hasbanio Chrodoberto duce). Remarkably, the lands given to the Abbey were described as being "in pago Hasbaniensi et Masuarinsi" — literally the land of Hasbanians and Masuarians. The second word is probably related to Masao. Some commentators such as Gorissen, Ewig, and Nonn (p.93), see this record as indicating that Robert had an older type of jurisdiction over an area including both Hasbania or the Maasgau.
- In about 830 Einhard described a place "in pago Mosavo".
- In an 837 plan to divide the Frankish kingdoms one of the counties named (not pagi in this case) is Masagao (in the Annales Bertiniani) or Masagouwi (in Nithard I.6).
- In 841, Nithard describes Gilbert (or Giselbert), who may be an ancestor of the so-called Regnarids, as "comes Mansuariorum", "Count of the Mansuari". There is uncertainly about how to interpret this terminology, though Gorissen, Ewig and Nonn all see it as likely to be related to the earlier description of "Count or Duke" Robert. In one surviving manuscript the "n" is missing.
- In 858 Sint-Odiliënberg near Roermond, then known simply as Berg, was described as being "in pago Maso" and sitting about the river Roer, which is a tributary of the Maas.
- In the Treaty of Meerssen of 870, the Maas river was a dividing line between two Frankish kingdoms. The Maas valley region north of Maastricht is described as having two parts, a lower and higher (subterior and superior) Masau, and each of these two parts was to be divided by the river. The Abbeys in the area, and the "districts" of Maastricht and Aachen, were treated separately.
- In a falsified charter from 858-872, Kessel, Limburg, on the Maas between Roermond and Venlo, is described as "in pago Masensi Cassellum".
- In a falsified royal diploma of Otto the Great from 946 relating to Gembloux Abbey, two places are named in the comitatus (county, note: not a pagus in this case) called "Maisou": the villa called "Mauic" and the villa called "Biettine". The latter was identified by Jean Baerten as Obbicht.
- In 950 another Gembloux record mentions a place "in pago Masau".
- A royal charter of 7 Oct 950, Kessel on the left bank of the Maas between Roermond and Venlo is described as being "in pago Masalant in comitatu Ruodolfi" (in the country of Maasland, in the county of Rudolf). Note that this time, the "Maasland" form is used. This is one of the only occasions where a count with jurisdiction in this region is clearly named.
- 4 Jul 952. It was probably the same count Rudolf who was count near Maaseik. Alden-Eyck near Maaseik (mentioned separately in the Treaty of Meerssen) was described as being "in pago Huste in comitatu Ruodulphi" (in the country of Huste, in the county of Rudolf). Note that in this record, although it is on the Maas, Masao or Maasland is not mentioned. Huste or Hufte is sometimes considered to be a word derived from Hocht, in Lanaken, also on the Maas but approximately 30km southwards. Van de Weerd proposed it was Hoeselt. Wherever it was, it must have been the seat of a count.
- In an undated record from Fulda the villas called Blaricga [Blerik] and Walaran are mentioned, "in pago Masao iuxta flumen More".

As pointed out by Verhelst, the term Masalant (Maasland) is used mainly when referring to Maastricht, and according to him it is only used by mistake in the 950 case above. In 889, 898 and 919, Maastricht is specifically described as being in the comitatus (county) of Maselant. In the 898 record it is added that it is also in the Pagus of Hasbania. In a different record of 898 it is described simply as being in the pagus of Maseland. In contrast, in a 919 record it is described simply as being in the comitatus of Hasbania.

== Bibliography ==
- Despy, G (1961), "La charte de 741-742 du comte Robert de Hesbaye pour l'abbaye de Saint-Trond" (PDF), Annales du XXXVIIe Congrès de la Fédération Archéologique et Historique de Belgique, Bruxelles, 24-30 Août 1958: 82–91
- Ewig, Eugen, Die Stellung Ribuariens in der Verfassungsgeschichte des Merowingerreichs, vol. 1, pp. 450–471
- Gorissen, P (1964), "Maasgouw, Haspengouw, Mansuarië", Revue Belge de Philologie et d'Histoire, 42 (42–2): 383–398, doi:10.3406/rbph.1964.2516
- Nonn, Ulrich (1983), Pagus und Comitatus in Niederlothringen: Untersuchung zur politischen Raumgliederung im frühen Mittelalter
- Vanderkindere, Léon (1902), La formation territoriale des principautés belges au Moyen Age (PDF), vol. 2
- Verhelst, Karel (1984), "Een nieuwe visie op de omvang en indeling van de pagus Hasbania (part 1)", Handelingen van de Koninklijke Zuidnederlandsche Maatschappij voor Taal- en Letterkunde en Geschiednis, 38
- Verhelst, Karel (1985), "Een nieuwe visie op de omvang en indeling van de pagus Hasbania (part 2)", Handelingen van de Koninklijke Zuidnederlandsche Maatschappij voor Taal- en Letterkunde en Geschiednis, 39
