= Giselbert of Loon =

First Count of Loon

Giselbert van Loon (probably died about 1045) is the first definitely known count of the County of Loon, a territory which, at least in later times, roughly corresponded to the modern Belgian province of Limburg, and generations later became a lordship directly under the Prince-bishopric of Liège. Very little is known about him except that he had two brothers, one of whom, Bishop Balderic II of Liège, is much better attested in historical records.

== Origins ==
Giselbert's parents are not known for sure. A 14th century writer of the Gesta (chronicle) of the Abbey of St Truiden states that the parents of Giselbert and Balderic were Count Otto of Loon (otherwise unknown) and his wife Liutgarde, daughter of Countess Ermengarde of Namur, who was a daughter of Duke Otto of Lower Lotharingia. However, there are doubts about the reliability of this much later source. (For example, other records confirm that Countess Ermengarde was a sister of Duke Otto, not a daughter.)

In contrast to the chronicle continuation, it was proposed by Joseph Daris (in 1896), and Léon Vanderkindere (in 1900), that Giselbert is likely to be son of Rudolf, whose mother was a daughter of Count Reginar II, and father was Count Nevelong. This Rudolf, known from a 943 record, when he was still a boy, was the younger brother and nephew of two bishops named Balderic: Balderic I of Liège and Balderic of Utrecht. Because of the very big gap in generations, two proposals have been made in which Otto, Count of Looz is accepted as father of Gilbert, but in a way which makes him Nevelong's grandson, adding a generation:

- J.M. Winter proposed that Otto was a son of Rudolf.
- Jongbloed proposed that Otto was son of Bertha, the mother of Count Arnoul of Valenciennes, who Vanderkindere long ago proposed to be a sister of Rudolf.

In medieval records, Bishop Balderic II of Liège, about which more was written than his brothers, was said to be a kinsman of both Lambert I, Count of Louvain and Arnoul of Valenciennes. According to Kupper, he may have also had common ancestry with Bishop Gerard of Florennes.

Balderic II, Giselbert's brother, donated his personal possessions at Pannerden in Batavia (Betuwe), near areas associated with the family of Nevelong, to the church in Liège. Just before the Battle of Vlaardingen, where Balderic died of sickness on campaign, he was accused of wanting to spare a blood-relative, which implies a close relationship to Count Dirk III of Holland.

It has been proposed that Giselbert's brother Arnulf (or Arnoul, or Arnold) was the count Arnold described in a royal charter of 1040 as count of a county named Haspinga, in the pagus of Haspingouw, a reference which has caused many different interpretations. According to Baerten, when a county called Haspinga was donated to the Prince-bishopric of Liège, it is probable that Loon was a fief of Haspinga, and thus became a fief of Liege. In any case when the male line of the Counts died out, the Bishop claimed the county successfully.

== Life ==
It is not certain when Giselbert started his rule, but his brother Balderic became bishop by 1008. The third continuation of the medieval chronicle kept at the nearby abbey of St Truiden (Gestorum Abbatem Trudonensium Continuatio Tertia) states that Giselbert did not become count of Loon (Borgloon) until about 1021, after his brother Bishop Balderic II had already died in 1018, and it says there were some years between his father Otto's death and him taking up the position. Records from Liège on the other hand seem to indicate that Giselbert was already an adult and count during his brother's reign.

Giselbert apparently died around 1045, because in 1044 a charter of St. Barthélémy of Liége mentions a count Giselbert, probably (but not certainly) him, and in May 1046 the next generation of counts, the brothers Emmo and Otto, appear as counts of Loon.

As pointed out for example by Verhelst (1984), it is not certain that Giselbert of Loon was the father of the next counts of Loon, Emmo and Otto. There is no medieval source which confirms that relationship.

Giselbert's county was based in Borgloon, originally simply called Loon. The castle, probably built (or rebuilt) by his grandson, was a motte-and-bailey, with a hall and a chapel in the front court. The area nearby forms the core of the modern town. The castle itself was destroyed some generations later and the hill on which it stood was excavated in the 19th century.

Giselbert was the first known advocate (voogd, advocatus) of Saint-James Abbey in Liege, founded by his brother Balderic.

== Succession ==
Giselbert was succeeded as Count of Loon by two brothers, who may have been sons, or in any case close relatives:

- Count Emmo (d. before 1078), possibly Giselbert's son. Ancestor of the counts of Loon.
- Count Otto, also described in contemporary records as a count "of Loon"; may have shared his brother's rule in some way. Ancestor of the counts of Duras.

No wife is named for Giselbert in medieval records. A noblewoman named Erlende is sometimes mentioned in genealogies, including the Europaische Stammtafeln. As explained by Baerten (1965 part I) this is no longer accepted. The Vita Arnulfi describes Lutgarde of Namur as mother of both Emmo Count of Loon, who was father of Count Arnulf of Loon and his sister Sophia, and also Otto, who was father of Count Gislebert of Duras. This Lutgarde is described as a sister of Count Albert of Namur. Her husband is not named there. But the Gesta of St Truiden appears to say that the same Lutgarde was the mother of Bishop Balderic II, the brother of Emmo's supposed father Gilbert. In short, these sources are in conflict with each other, and at least one of them seems to be misinterpreting the facts.
