= Otto of Loon =

Count of Looz

Otto is a purported Count of Loon (Dutch: Graafschap Loon, French: Comté de Looz) and father of Count Giselbert, who would have been adult roughly around the years 980–1000. He appears in only one much later (probably 14th century) document that is considered unreliable, so his existence is doubted. The list of the counts of Loon is normally started with Giselbert.

Since Leon Vanderkindere's seminal publications at the beginning of the twentieth century, scholars have tended to ignore the medieval report of Otto and accept Vanderkindere's proposal that Giselbert's father was Rudolf, the son of Count Nevelung. More recently, proposals have been made that Otto might have existed and been a son or nephew of Rudolf.

None of these proposals have led to any consensus and can only be taken as speculative proposals. Jean Baerten, whose works in the 1960s are seen as an authority for this subject, doubted the existence of Otto at all.

The only record of Otto, the third continuation of the chronicle or Gesta of the abbey of St Truiden tells of the installation of Baldrick II as Prince-Bishop of Liege, and that he was the brother of Count Giselbert of Loon, and the son of Count Otto of Loon and Liutgard of Namur. It says Liutgarde's mother Ermengarde was a countess of Namur, without naming how she became countess (presumably by marrying one of the Counts of Namur), and a daughter of a Duke Otto. It also claims she was an ancestor to Godfrey of Bouillion.

Criticism of this source, written long after the facts, centres around the more detailed information it gives about Liutgard.

- One reason this account is often rejected is that this description of the mother of Gislebert seems almost identical to that of the mother of the next known count of Loon, Emmo of Loon (d. 1078), found in the Vita Arnulfi Episcopi Suessioniensis I.3, MGH SS XV.2, p. 879. As pointed out by Baerten, Félix Rousseau, an historian of Namur, treated the two Liutgardes as if both could be correct records, even though, if they were both true, it would give consanguinity (forbidden cousin marriage) problems. (Nevertheless, Rousseau's solution was more recently used by Jongbloed.)
- Another concern is that her grandfather "Duke Otto" is Otto, Duke of Lower Lorraine, and it is chronologically impossible for him to be great-grandfather of Bishop Balderic and Count Giselbert. Rousseau, and more recently Jongbloed (pp. 49–50), argued that this Duke Otto must be the one who died 944, Otto, Duke of Lorraine in order to solve this problem. However, there is no such problem for the report of Lutgarde being the mother of Gilbert's successor Emmo, and so that appears to be the correct account.

In summary, although there is a high chance of this being wrong, the Gestorum Abbatem Trudonensium Continuatio Tertia tells us that Otto married Lutgarde, who was from Namur, and had two sons. Their brother Arnulf is known from other records, so their children would be:

- Bishop Balderic II of Liège
- Giselbert, Count of Loon
- Count Arnulf, also known as Arnold, Count of Haspinga.

== Sources ==
- Baerten (1965), "Les origines des comtes de Looz et la formation territoriale du comté", Revue belge de philologie et d'histoire, 43 (2): link
- Baerten, Jean (1969), Het Graafschap Loon (11de - 14de eeuw) link
- Jongbloed (2008), "Flamenses in de elfde eeuw", Bijdragen en Mededelingen Gelre
- Rousseau, Félix (1936) Actes des comtes de Namur de la première race (946-1196) link
- Vanderkindere, Léon (1902), "Chapter 9" (PDF), La formation territoriale des principautés belges au Moyen Age, vol. 2, p. 128
