= Pagus of Hasbania =

Medieval geo-political territory in east of modern Belgium

The pagus or gau of Hasbania was a large early medieval territory in what is now eastern Belgium. It is now approximated by the modern French- and Dutch-speaking region called Hesbaye in French, or Haspengouw in Dutch — both being terms derived from the medieval one. Unlike many smaller pagi of the period, Hasbania apparently never corresponded to a single county. It already contained several in the 9th century. It is therefore described as a "Großgau" (large gau), like the Pagus of Brabant, by modern German historians such as Ulrich Nonn.

The Hesbaye region was a core agricultural territory for the early Franks who settled in the Roman Civitas Tungrorum, which was one of the main parts of early Frankish Austrasia, and later Lotharingia. The region was also culturally important, a central part of what is referred to in art history as the Mosan region. It contained a substantial Romanized population and the seat of a large bishopric, that played a role in converting northern Franks to Christianity, and in the secular administration of the area. The bishop's seat moved from the Roman capital at Tongeren to a new base at Liège, both of which were located in Hasbania.

Geographically, this region centres around a fertile plateau, which has been an agricultural region since the Neolithic. This higher ground forms a watershed between the Meuse and Scheldt drainage basins. In modern times "Hesbaye" and "Haspengouw" are geographical terms which are used for example in tourism and agriculture, and do not have the geo-political importance that they had in the early Middle Ages.

== Location ==
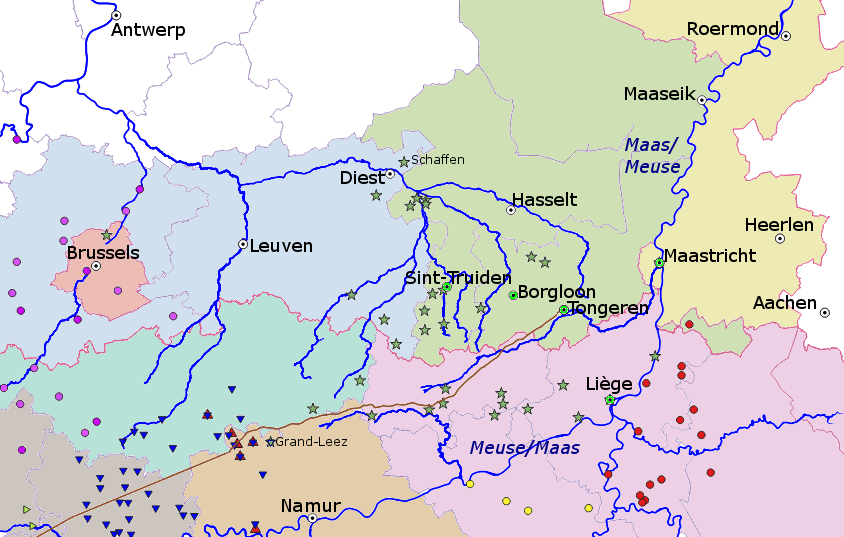
The green stars show early medieval records of places which were in the pagus of Hasbania, lying to the north and west of a bend in the Meuse (or Maas) river at Liège. The shaded areas are modern provinces of Belgium and the Netherlands.

Early medieval records mentioning identifiable places in the pagus of Hasbania included both Maastricht and Liège on the Meuse river, which formed the apparent boundary to the south and east. Many of the earliest records were from near the Gete river system, and stretched in places as far north as the Demer river, for example in the area of Diest.

In the southwest, medieval records show that the pagus stretched to the area near the Abbey of Gembloux, in the modern Belgian Province of Namur. Grand-Leez, just east of Gembloux, was named in different medieval records as being either in the Darnau pagus, which was a part of the Pagus Lomacensis, or in Hasbania.

Some scholars such as Léon Vanderkindere, and following him also Jean Baerten, and more recently Karl Verhelst, believe that from the earliest times Louvain (Leuven) was an integral part of Hasbania, and that the pagus stretched northwest of the line between Louvain and Diest, to the point where the Demer and Dyle join. However, the history of this less agricultural area is unclear before the 11th century, and the first mentions of a County of Louvain are under Count Lambert I in 1003.

== Name ==
In the earliest records, the Germanic element "gau" was not included as part of the name, and the typical Latin spelling is Hasbania. Occasionally the name is in an adjectival form indicating "(of the) Hasbanien(s)" (Hasbaniensis). Later come forms with the "gau" element such as Haspengewe in 966 and Haspengouue in 982, similar to the modern Dutch word for the area, "Haspengouw".

Maurits Gysseling suggested the first part of the name, Has-, could technically have come from the word Chatti, an ancient German tribe whose name apparently changed into the later Hesse following known pronunciation changes which happened in Germany, but this is considered unlikely to be the real origin. The second element could be related to the word for the medieval concept of "ban", meaning a type of authority or lordship, and is similar to endings of other Frankish regions known from this period. Another common proposal is that the name was originally an older name of a locality within the region, such as the one where the villages of Overhespen and Neerhespen are.

Verhelst (p. 245 n.45) proposed that the small number cases of medieval Latin which include the Germanic "gau" ending are uncoincidentally in or near the old deaconry of Tongeren, which he proposed to be the historical core of the Hesbaye. Therefore, he proposed, the terms Hasbania and Haspengouw can not be assumed to have identical meanings in all records, even though in modern Dutch the form with "gouw" is now the only one, while in modern French the form without is the only one.

According to some proposals, the name may once have applied to a much smaller area, for example, the area near Overhespen and Neerhespen, both now in Linter. Toorians has proposed that such place-names might derive from villas owned by Roman era land owners with the Gaulish name Casibennos.

== Importance and origin ==
In the 4th century the Roman emperor Julian the Apostate permitted the Salian Franks to settle just north of the Hesbaye area in Texandria. He met them in Tongeren, the Roman capital of the Civitas Tungrorum, which is today a part of the Dutch-speaking part of the Hesbaye (or Haspengouw). During the following centuries, the southern more-Romanized population sent missionaries north to convert the Franks to Christianity.

The Franks, for their part, contributed heavily to the Roman military, and according to Gregory of Tours, they established small kingdoms in each of the old Roman civitates. The Hesbaye became a particularly important region for the Frankish aristocracy and clergy, straddling the northernmost stretch of the medieval Germanic-Romance language border in Europe. Nobility associated with the area had numerous relations with the major dynasties of the medieval Franks. Eugen Ewig proposed that Hasbania together with the neighbouring Meuse (Dutch: Maas) river valley, formed one of the old Austrasian provinces ruled by a dux or military leader, along with the Champagne, the Moselle, Alsace and Ribuaria. He proposed that it was possibly named Masuaria, and was based on the core (Kernraum) of the large Roman civitas of Tongeren.

== Clerical boundaries ==
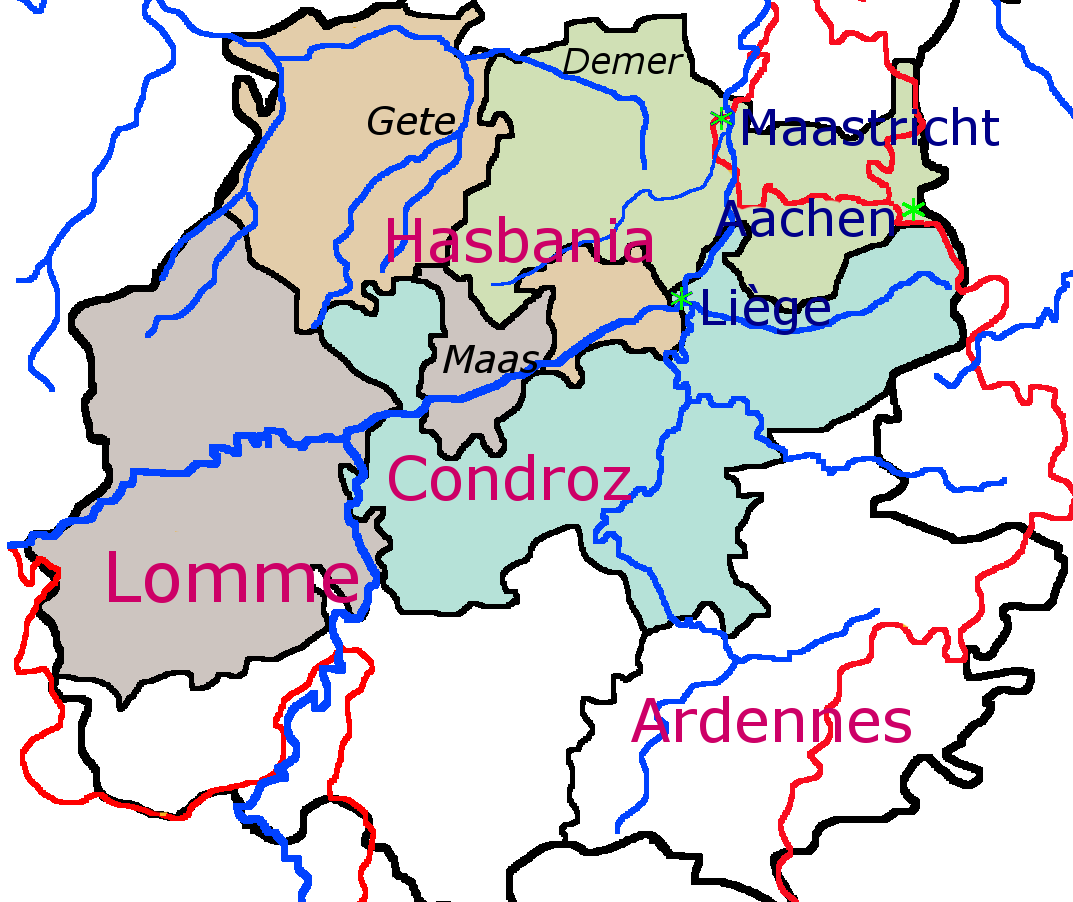
Late medieval Archdioceses compared to the approximate pagi (gau) positions in crimson. The Hasbania or Hesbaye archdiocese is green, and stretches east to include Aachen, beyond the normal territory of Hasbania. The red boundaries are modern international borders.

In the Middle Ages, the bishopric of Liège continued to exist, as the church of the old Roman civitas Tungrorum.

Around 800, the Bishop of Liège addressed himself to his faithful parishioners, naming only the people of the Condroz, Lomme (later the core of County of Namur), Hasbania, and the Ardennes, with no mention of the Meuse valley or Texandria further north. This record has been taken as showing that the northern part of the old Roman civitas now under the spiritual leadership of Liège no longer had clear parochial boundaries, and missionary work to extend the Christian diocese was on-going at this time.

The later medieval Catholic archdeaconries of the Hesbaye region, established by the Bishop of Liège, are difficult to match to political or geographical concepts, though attempts have been made to gain insight this way, for example by Baerten and Verhelst. Clerically, much of geographical Hesbaye was divided between neighbouring jurisdictions, while the archdeaconry named Hasbania stretched far eastwards over the Meuse, as far as Aachen in modern Germany.

== Earliest records ==
The earliest mention Nonn gives is in the medieval biography of Bavo of Ghent (622–659) which says that Bavo came from the "ducatus" of the Hasbaniensis, indicating that it was an early Frankish form of dukedom.

In 680 in a record by the Merovingian King Theuderic III granting lands to the Abbey of St Vaast in Arras, known from a later confirmation of 875–877, places mentioned are described as being in the pagi of Hasbania and Ribuaria. The best identified ones are near Sint-Truiden: Halmaal, Muizen, and Emmeren in Hoepertingen.

Hesbaye, or at least the country of the Hesbanien people, is next mentioned in a charter of 741/2 which exists in several versions, wherein a "count or duke of Hasbania" (comes vel dux Hasbanie) named Robert, son of Lambert, granted lands near Diest to Sint-Truiden Abbey. This was reported in the much later third continuation of the chronicle of the Abbey (p. 371), in its report of the charter, it specifically says that in the charter concerning the lands, this Robert called himself a count, but also that he was mentioned in the biography (Vita) of Bishop Eucherius of Orléans. In surviving versions of that Vita, when Charles Martel exiled Eucherius to Cologne this was under the custody of a Duke Robert of Hasbania (Hasbanio Chrodoberto duce).

A remarkable point about Count or Duke Robert of Hesbaye is that the lands given to the Abbey were described as being "in pago Hasbaniensi et Masuarinsi"— literally the land of Hasbanians and Masuarians. Masuaria is probably the Masao or Maasgau—the pagus or gau of the Meuse (Dutch: Maas) valley districts nearest to these lands. Ewig and Nonn compare the word to a 714 document concerning Susteren Abbey north of Maastricht (in pago Mosariorum).

This has been seen by for example Gorissen, Ewig, and Nonn (p. 93), as indicating that Robert had jurisdiction over an area larger than Hasbania, including at least part of the neighbouring Meuse valley.

Based almost entirely on his name, this Count or Duke Robert is speculated by genealogists such as Christian Settipani to be a direct ancestor of the Robertians and the royal House of Capet. And Robert may well have been related to Ermengarde, the wife of Louis I the Pious, because her great-uncle Bishop Chrodegang was named in The Gesta Episcoporum Mettensis as being from Hasbania and of very noble Frankish descent ("ex pago Hasbaniensi" and "Francorum ex genere primæ nobilitatis progenitus"). Chrodegang's parents are known to have been named Sigramnus and Landrada, although their background can only be speculated upon.

== 9th century ==
In the 9th century, there appear to have been several leaders in the Hesbaye. Count Ekkebard was reported to be one of the leaders of the pagus of Hesbaye in 834 who tried to negotiate the release of Emperor Louis the Pious. (Possibly the same person as Count Etkard who was killed, and had two sons captured, at the siege of Toulouse against Pepin II, King of Aquitaine.)

In the mid 9th century, an important figure in this region was a count named Gilbert (or Giselbert), who may be an ancestor of the so-called Regnarids who would dominate the region in the next century. Two territorial holdings are described in documents: he was count in Darnau, which later became a part of the County of Namur, and also (by Nithard) "comes Mansuariorum", "Count of the Mansuari". Historians associate this term with the "pago Hasbaniensi et Masuarinsi" of Count Robert near Diest in 741, and with both the Hesbaye and Meuse (Dutch: Maas) valley to its east. The addition of the "n" in most of the copies is, however, surprising. Gorissen relates it the Merovingian "Via Mansuerisca" which was in the Ardennes, but which he understood to be a road named after its destination near Maastricht.

Reginar I "Longneck" (d. 915) is considered a likely son (or close relative) of this Gilbert. There are indications he also had direct interests in the Hesbaye. To the east of it, he was Lay Abbot of important Abbeys stretching from the Meuse to the Mosselle through the Ardennes, Saint-Servais in Maastricht, Echternach, Stavelot-Malmedy, and Saint-Maximin in Triers, running approximately along the border defined in 870. However, his secular titles and activities are mainly only known from much later sources which are considered to be of uncertain reliability. Most relevant, Dudo of Saint-Quentin, in describing the great deeds of the early Normans, calls Reginar I (who, along with a prince of the Frisians named Radbod, was an opponent of Rollo) a Duke of both Hainaut and Hesbaye. Centuries later William of Jumièges, and then later still, Alberic de Trois Fontaines followed Dudo using the same titles when describing the same events. He was variously referred to as Duke, Count, Marquis, missus dominicus, but historians doubt that these titles were connected to a particular territory. That he called himself a Duke is known from a charter at Stavelot 21 July 905.

Traditionally, the 10th-century Count Rudolf, discussed below, is seen as a grandson of Reginar I, and younger brother of Reginar III.

== Treaty of Meerssen (870) ==
The Treaty of Meersen of 8 August 870 gave a relatively detailed description of Lotharingian territories, in dividing them between Louis the German, King of East Francia, and his half-brother Charles the Bald, King of the West Franks.

Notably, the treaty described Hasbania as having four counties (in Hasbanio comitatus quatuor). All of these went to Charles in 870, with other territories west of the Meuse river, though they came back to the eastern kingdom in new agreements such as the Treaty of Ribemont. The detailed listing makes it clear that the various abbeys, the Meuse valley pagus of Masao, and the Luihgau (with Visé) were not included in these four counties.

Vanderkindere in 1902 proposed four counties based on river boundaries, and the few mentions of counties in the 10th and 11th centuries. Adaptations to these proposals were made by Baerten (1965a), and later Verhelst (1985), who both referred also to medieval church jurisdictions, not only deaconries, but also old processional districts, arguing that these tended to follow political reality, but with a long lag, thus helping us see older political boundaries. Some of the possible counties can be listed.

Three 20th-century proposals about the four counties of Hasbania, mentioned in the 870 treaty of Meerssen.

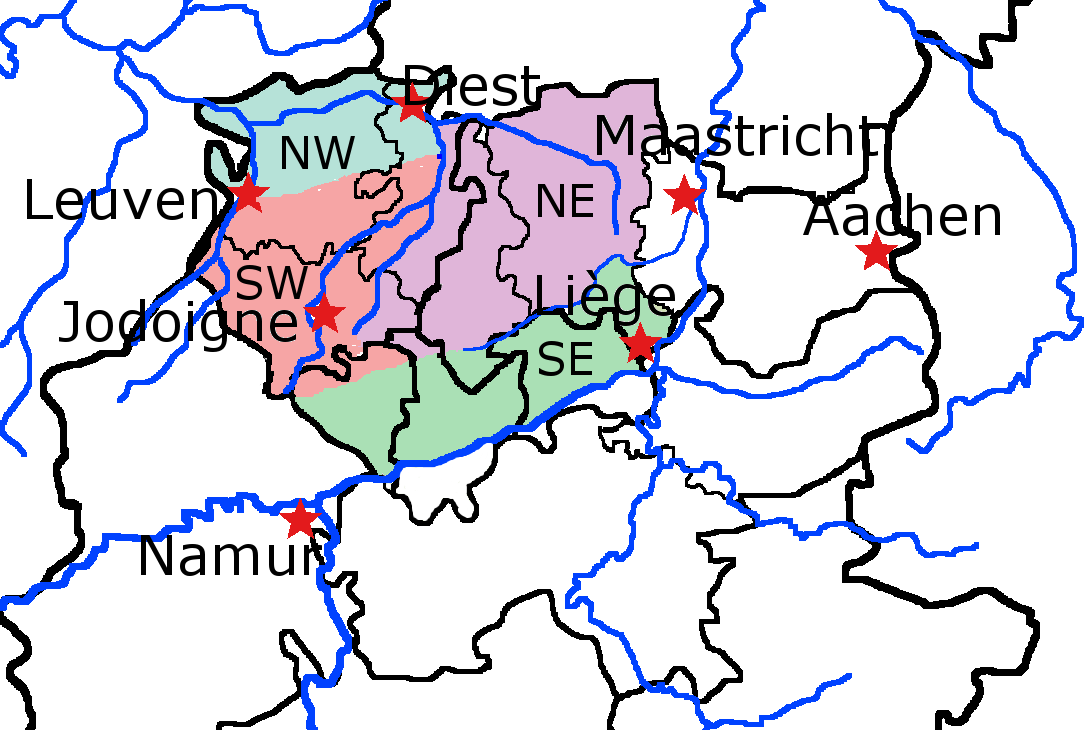
Approximate proposals by Léon Vanderkindere (1902)

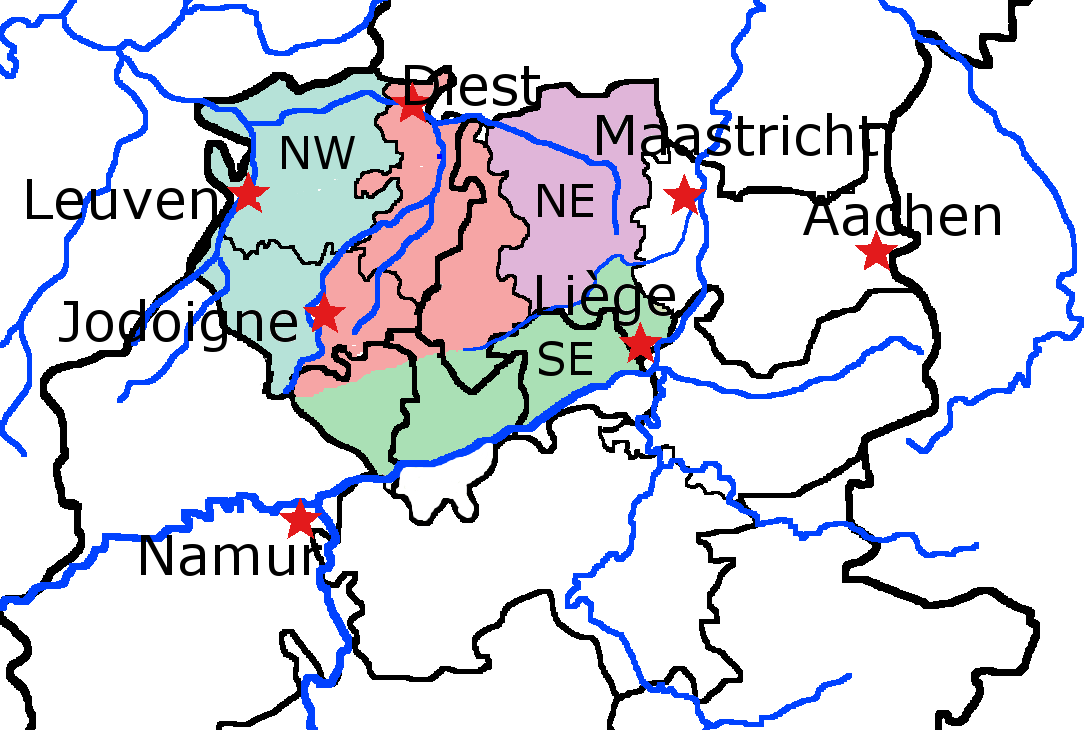
Jean Baerten's (1965) proposal, based upon Vanderkindere's

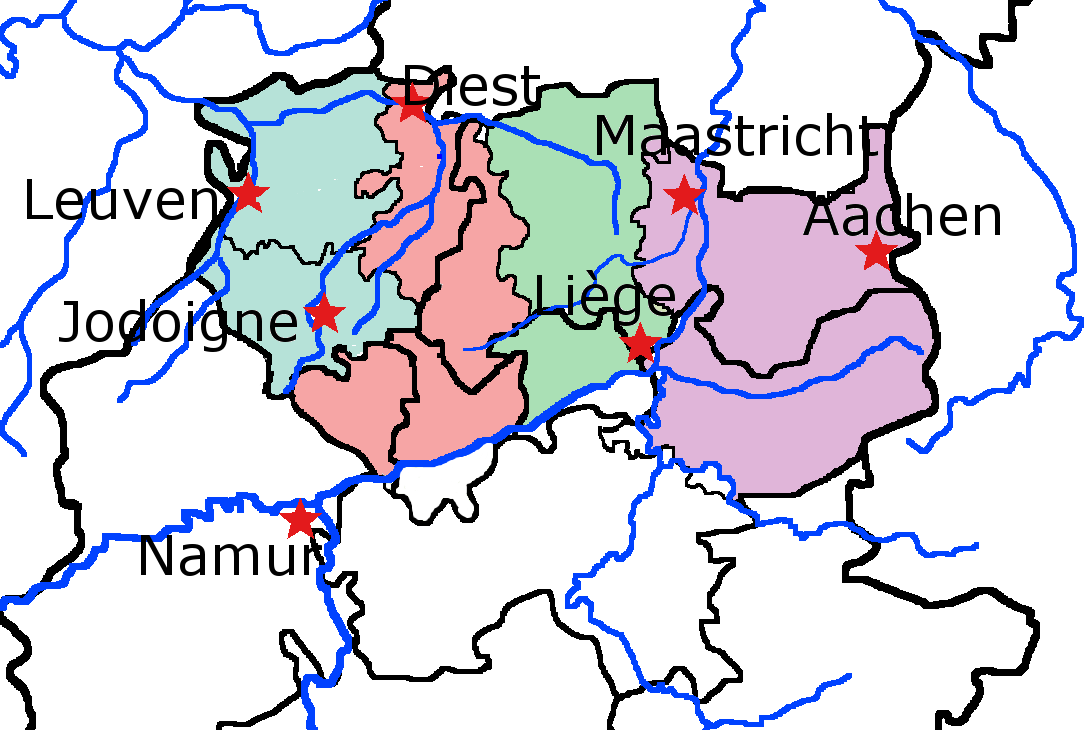
Karl Verhelst's (1985) proposal for the early-9th-century counties

== Counties in the 9th and 10th centuries ==
=== The future county of Louvain, between Dyle and Demer ===
Although there is no early medieval record of the future County of Louvain being considered to be part of the Hesbaye/Hasbania, there are also no records of it being in any of the other known pagi. The area which is now eastern Flemish Brabant, between the Gete and Dyle rivers, seems to have been relatively undeveloped, and is mentioned in few records. Verhelst proposed (pp. 264–265) that Hasbania expanded naturally in this direction in the 7th to 9th centuries.

Vanderkindere proposed a large "northwestern" county of Louvain already existing in 870, stretching as far east as Diest, and all within the original pagus of Hasbania named in the Treaty of Meerssen. Verhelst and Baerten agreed that there probably was such a western county in 870, though not necessarily already named "Louvain", and smaller, not including Diest and Zoutleeuw.

=== Brunengeruz ===
On the upper Gete, near Hoegaarden and Tienen, Vanderkindere (p. 131,143) proposed that the poorly attested 10th-century county of Brunengeruz could be considered the remnant of an older and larger "southwestern" county of Hesbaye which existed already in 870. Also known as "Brugeron" in older scholarship, it was named in a charter under which Emperor Otto III confirmed properties of the church of Liège including comitatum de Brunengeruuz.

However, neither Baerten nor Verhelst list it as one of the 4 likely 870 counties, believing it only came into existence after 870. Verhelst argued explicitly that it was a newer creation that split out of the older western county in the 10th century. Baerten (1965a) argued that at least the part around Jodoigne had been part of the central county of Avernas.

=== County of Haspinga ===
Vanderkindere considered the southeastern area between Liège and Maastricht and the Jeker and Meuse rivers to be one of the four counties of 870. More specifically this southeastern county was a county named after Hasbania itself. Baerten agreed, but Verhelst disagreed that there was any such separate county in that area, and argued that the county of Hesbaye found in old records was larger, and originally united with the northeastern county.

There are only a small number of mentions of a smaller county named after the greater pagus or gau of Hasbania:

- The county of Haspinga was recorded in 1040 (comitatum Arnoldi comitis nomine Haspinga in pago Haspingowi), when granted by Emperor Henry III to the Cathedral of Saint-Lambert in Liège by charter dated 24 Jan 1040.
- Daris and Nonn interpret a 956 charter involving Jemeppe-sur-Meuse as another record of the same county, it being described as being in the pagus Hasbaniensis in the county of the same (in ipse pago Hasbaniense in comitatus ipsius).
- Nonn adds that Stier near Donceel was described as being in a county named Asbanio in 961, in a document involving Gembloux Abbey.

Also, the city of Maastricht, which is at the point where the Geer enters the Meuse, was also referred to sometimes as being in a county of Hasbania. See below.

The importance of this county named after the larger pagus is a topic of much discussion. It was argued already by Jean de Hocsem in the Middle Ages that this had represented the name of an overarching lordship, covering all of Hesbaye, with the Count of Loon under it. This argument was used to explain the legitimacy of the claims of the Prince-Bishop of Liège to be overlord of the Counts of Loon. Vanderkindere, Baerten and Verhelst all accept variations of this proposal.

=== County of "Huste" ===
The northeastern county in 870, according to Baerten and Verhelst, was the one called "Huste" or "Hufte" in the mid-10th century, when it was under the jurisdiction of a Count Rudolf, who apparently also had jurisdiction over Avernas and at least part of the Maasland or Maasau.

This county is the apparent predecessor of the later County of Loon, because like that 11th-century county, its jurisdiction apparently united places near both Borgloon and Maaseik, which is in a different pagus, the Masau.

Baerten and Verhelst disagreed with Vanderkindere that the two 10th-century counties of Huste and Avernas originally formed one county in 870, when the Treaty of Meerssen was made, though they agreed that they came under one count in the mid-10th century. Instead, based upon clerical jurisdictions, and the later medieval division between the counties of Loon and Duras, they believe there was an old and long-lasting jurisdictional boundary between Sint-Truiden and Borgloon. Thus the region which already contained two counties in 870 according to them.

Disagreeing with both Vanderkindere and Baerten, Verhelst also proposed that this eastern county stretched further south beyond the Geer, all the way to Liège.

To support this conclusion, Baerten emphasized that a Sint-Truiden land transaction (now dated between 927 and 964 and probably around 950) distinguished several places in the small area between Sint-Truiden and Borgloon as being in the two different counties:

- In Avernas: Muizen (Gingelom) and Buvingen (both in Gingelom), and Heusden, a part of Kerkom-bij-Sint-Truiden, which is now in Sint-Truiden.
- In "Hufte", or Huste: Heers and Engelmanshoven.

Baerten noted that the two groups are close, but separated by the old medieval deanery boundaries of Sint-Truiden and Tongeren, and in the 11th century probably also the boundaries between the counties of Duras and Loon probably ran in a similar way.

Huste appears to have been a geographical area that included Maaseik on the river Meuse (Dutch: Maas).

- 4 Jul 952. Alden-Eyck near Maaseik is described as being "in pago Huste in comitatu Ruodulphi" (in the country of Huste, in the county of Rudolf).

The above land transaction does not name the count or counts with jurisdiction, but a Rudolf (not named as a count) is named as a neighbour bordering some of the lands. However, from other records it is known that one or more Count Rudolfs in this approximate period held all or part of the counties of Avernas and Huste/Hufte, including territory outside Hasbania, in the Meuse valley where the County of Loon also had a presence. All these Rudolfs are therefore understood by Vanderkindere and Baerten to be one Rudolf, Count of Avernas who is argued to be a predecessor of the Counts of Loon.

Furthermore, this Count Rudolf is traditionally seen as a grandson of Reginar I, and younger brother of Reginar III who was banished to Bohemia in 958. Vanderkindere, Baerten, and others accept this identification. To support it, they note that like Reginar III, a Rudolf in this area was accused of infidelity to the king:

- In 17 January 966, a Sint-Truiden Abbey charter states that a Rudolf's property at Gelmen (between St Truiden and Borgloon) had been confiscated and was now in the hands of the collegiate church of Maria in the imperial capital at Aachen. It was within the county of a Count Werner in the pagus of Hesbaye. (This Rudolf, like the neighbour mentioned above, is not described as a count.)

This Count Werner thus appears to have been a count of the count of "Huste" or "Hufte". Hlawitschka has identified him as a probable member of the Matfrieder family. He died in 973 with his brother, fighting members of the Reginar family. It is not clear who replaced him in Hasbania, but in Hainaut, where he died, his probable relative Count Godfrey "the captive" took control in subsequent years.

Huste or Hufte is considered by Baerten, Gorissen and others be a word derived from Hocht, in Lanaken, close to Maastricht and the Hesbaye. Van de Weerd has proposed that Huste was Hoeselt, close to Hocht, but in the Hesbaye. Wherever it was, Huste has been proposed to be the seat of an original core territory of the county of Loon in the 11th century. However, doubts remain about the location, and even the correct form of the name.

=== County of Avernas ===
Baerten and Verhelst proposed a county of Avernas, which stretched north to Diest, and already existed in 870. Based on its name, attested twice in the 10th century, the county's seat must have been at the villages of Avernas-le-Bauduin and Cras Avernas, now both part of Hannut. Apart from the charter mentioned above, which mentions no count, there is one other charter which mentions the county:

- Approximately 946, a charter mentions "villa lens in comitatu avernae temporibus rodulphi comitis" (Villa Lens in the County of Avernas under the rule of Count Rodulphe).

Lens is the name of two neighboring villages near the villages of Avernas, Lens-Saint-Servais, and Lens-Saint-Remy.

As noted by Baerten, it is remarkable that Count Werner, who apparently took control after Rudolf in neighbouring areas, does not appear as a signatory on a Sint-Truiden charter of 967, implying that he may not have taken control of all of Rudolf's counties. The charter was a grant by Bertha, the mother of Count Arnulf of Valenciennes, of land in Brustem (near Sint-Truiden) to Sint-Truiden Abbey. Baerten's explanation for this is that a suitable heir had been found, Rudolf, son of Nevelong, a boy who had been proposed by Vanderkindere and Daris as the ancestor of the counts of Loon.

Verhelst, differently to Baerten, proposed that 9th-century Avernas originally included not only the medieval deaconries of Sint-Truiden and Zoutleeuw, but also French-speaking Andenne and Hanret. Thus, like its neighbour "Huste", Verhelst believed that in 870 it would have stretched from Diest all the way to the Meuse (Dutch: Maas).

Another difference between Baerten and Verhelst, as mentioned above, is that the "Brunengeruz" area around Hoegaarden the Great Gete was originally part of the western county according to Verhelst, whereas Baerten felt Jodoigne at least had originally been part of Avernas.

The only Count clearly named in the Hesbaye after Werner was named Eremfried, whose family connections are unclear. His county included Velm, very close to Sint-Truiden, Kerkom, Muizen and Buvingen, and he appears to have had a close connection to a family in the Ardennes which used the name Rudolf:

- In a charter made in Capua, 26 July 982, "on the day that we fight the Saracens" Otto II certified that if a certain "Cunradus, son of the late count Rudolf" died, he wanted his possessions in Lotharingia to go to Gorze Abbey, and these included "curtis Velm in pago Haspongowe et in comitate Eremfridi comitis". In the Battle of Cotrone itself (13 July 982, so it had already happened) it seems that both this Conrad, and this count Eremfried, lost their lives. Velm, now part of St Truiden, did come under Gorze Abbey, and a Count Irimfrid was recorded as dying. However, this Conrad's possessions were widespread, and on the basis of those Vanderkindere (1902 pp. 340–1) believes his father was Rodolphe Count of Ivois. Of this Count, however, Vanderkindere (p. 342) says that given his connection to Velm it is "not without some likelihood" that he is a member of the Regnarid family, where the name Rodolphe was familiar.

Both names, Eremfridus and Rodulfus, had appeared earlier as witnesses in the grant by Bertha, the mother of Count Arnulf of Valenciennes, of land in Brustem (near Sint-Truiden) to Sint-Truiden Abbey in 967.

=== Maastricht and "Maasland" ===
Verhelst, who did not believe in a separate southeastern county, instead proposed a county near Maastricht and Visé. He believed that in the 7th to 9th centuries, Hasbania expanded past the Meuse (Dutch: Maas) to include the area between Maastricht and Aachen and the future county of Liugas to the south, as far as the Amblève. This originally large county was, according to Verhelst, called the county of Maasland.

In 9th- and 10th-century records, Maastricht is described as being in the pagus and county of "Masaland". However, it is once described as being in the pagus of Hasbania and county of Masalant (in 898), and once as being simply in the county of Hasbania (919). Verhelst believed previous interpretations, which equate Masaland with the Masau or Maasgau, were wrong, and that Maasland was a county within Hasbania. According to Verhelst (p. 262) the 950 charter which describes a place further north in the Masao as being in the pagus of "Masalant" must be an error caused by the fact that the same count, a Count Rudolf, had jurisdiction in both places.

In contrast, Baerten described the hinterland of Maastricht, between it and Tongeren, as part of the "district" of Maastricht, which is separately named in the treaty of 870, and therefore not one of the four counties of Hasbania.

=== County of Huy ===
Straddling the Meuse to its south was the County of Huy, which had been created already before the 11th century, and already become the first county to be held directly by the Bishop of Liège.

== 11th century ==
In the 11th century, the "northwestern" counties of Duras and Loon started appearing in records, and records show such counts were considered to have counties in the pagus of Hesbaye. These two counties for the original core of today's Belgian Limburg. Loon had its seat in Borgloon, near Tongeren, and the town of Duras (nl) is today part of St Truiden. The records of lordships in this area are dominated in this period by the increasingly secular power of the Bishop of Liège.

=== County of Loon ===
In 1078, a grant to the bishop was made by a widow named Ermengarde. It included properties at not only the important Loon towns of Borgloon and Kuringen, but also closer to St Truiden, and even to the north, outside the Hesbaye. It has been suggested that in order to explain this she must have been married to Count Arnulf, but had no children with him.

=== County of Duras ===
The first explicit mention of Duras near Sint-Truiden was around 1100. The castle was held by a family descended from a younger brother of a count of Loon, Count Otto (died about 1087), whose family became known as the counts of Duras. The county later became part of the county of Loon.

=== County of Moha ===
In Vanderkindere's "southeast", the county of Moha existed between the Meuse and its tributary the Mehaigne. It was an allod that was sometimes referred to as a county because it was under the lordship of the counts of the Etichonid family who were Counts of Eguisheim and Dagsburg.

=== County of Grez ===
Grez-Doiceau, in Wallonia just between Louvain and Wavre, was also the site of a little-known county in the 11th century. Counts Werner of Grez and his brother Henry of Grez are known from several records and accompanied Godfrey of Bouillon to Jerusalem.

=== County of Huy ===
A significant part of the French-speaking Hesbaye came to be under the control of the County of Huy, which was also held a large part of Condroz, south of the Meuse. In 985, this county came to be part of the secular lordship of the Bishop of Liège, contributing to the formation of one of the first "prince-bishoprics" of the Holy Roman Empire.

=== County of Steppes ===
A county of Steppes is mentioned in several Liège charters, for example in 1011, 1036, 1078 and 1124. It contained Hélécine, Walshoutem and Avernas. It was also the site of the 1213 Battle of Steppes between the Duke of Brabant and the Bishop of Liège, by which time the plain called Steppes was considered to be under the jurisdiction of Montenaken. According to Vanderkindere this was never a real county, but an area of jurisdiction under the Bishop, conveniently referred to this way.

=== County of Dongelberg ===
In 1036 and 1078, a County of Dongelberg is referred to. It contained Incourt and its neighbouring hamlet Brombais. Incourt is just south of Dongelberg, which is just south of Jodoigne. As with Steppes, Vanderkindere believed this was never a real county, but an area of jurisdiction under the Bishop, conveniently referred to this way.

== Sources ==
- Baerten, J (1962), "Le comté de Haspinga et l'avouerie de Hesbaye (IXe-XIIe siècles)", Revue Belge de Philologie et d'Histoire, 40 (4): 1149–1167, doi:10.3406/rbph.1962.2438
- Baerten, Jean (1965a), "In Hasbanio comitatus quatuor (Verdrag van Meersen, 870)", Koninklijke Zuinederlandse Maatschappij voor Taal- en Letterkunde en Geschiedenis, XIX
- Baerten (1965), "Les origines des comtes de Looz et la formation territoriale du comté (suite et fin)", Revue Belge de Philologie et d'Histoire, 43 (4)
- Baerten, Jean (1969), Het Graafschap Loon (11de - 14de eeuw) (PDF)
- Daris, Jos. (1880), "L'ancienne principauté de Liége", Bulletin de l'Institut Archéologique Liégeois
- Despy, G (1961), "La charte de 741-742 du comte Robert de Hesbaye pour l'abbaye de Saint-Trond" (PDF), Annales du XXXVIIe Congrès de la Fédération Archéologique et Historique de Belgique, Bruxelles, 24-30 Août 1958: 82–91
- Ernst (1857), "Mémoire historique et critique sur les comtes de Hainaut de la première race", Bulletin de la Commission Royale d'Histoire, 9: 393–513
- Ewig, Eugen (1969), Die Stellung Ribuariens in der Verfassungsgeschichte des Merowingerreichs, vol. 1, pp. 450–471
- Gorissen, P (1964), "Maasgouw, Haspengouw, Mansuarië", Revue Belge de Philologie et d'Histoire, 42 (42–2): 383–398, doi:10.3406/rbph.1964.2516
- Hlawitschka, Eduard (1969), Die Anfänge des Hauses Habsburg-Lothringen. Genealogische Untersuchungen zur Geschichte Lothringens und des Reiches im 9., 10. und 11. Jahrhundert
- Jongbloed (2008), "Flamenses in de elfde eeuw", Bijdragen en Mededelingen Gelre
- Jongbloed, Hein H. (2006) "Immed "von Kleve" (um 950) : Das erste Klevische Grafenhaus (ca, 885 - ca. 1015) als Vorstufe des geldrischen Fürstentums", Annalen des historischen Vereins für den Niederrhein link
- Jongbloed, Hein H. (2009) "Listige Immo en Herswind. Een politieke wildebras in het Maasdal (938-960) en zijn in Thorn rustende dochter", Jaarboek. Limburgs Geschied- en Oudheidkundig Genootschap vol. 145 (2009) p. 9-67
- Kupper, Jean-Louis (2013), "La donation de la comtesse Ermengarde à l'Église de Liège (1078)" (PDF), Bulletin de la Commission Royale d'Histoire, 179: 5–50, doi:10.3406/bcrh.2013.4098
- Nonn, Ulrich (1983), Pagus und Comitatus in Niederlothringen: Untersuchung zur politischen Raumgliederung im frühen Mittelalter
- Pacquay, Jean (1903), "Amburnia et la source miraculeuse de saint Trudon", Bulletin de la Société et d'histoire du diocèse de Liége, 14: 267–352
- Parisot, Robert (1898), Le Royaume de Lorraine sous les Carolingiens also on google books.
- Roland, Charles Gustave (1920), "Les pagi de Lomme et de Condroz et leurs subdivisions", Annales de la Société archéologique de Namur, 34: 1–126, archived from the original on 2020-06-05
- Toorians, Lauran (2011), "The place-name Caspingio and its modern relatives: Heesbeen, Hesbaye/Haspengouw and Hespen", Zeitschrift für celtische Philologie, 58: 183–200, doi:10.1515/9783110223354.183, S2CID 164831626
- Verhelst, Karel (1984), "Een nieuwe visie op de omvang en indeling van de pagus Hasbania (part 1)", Handelingen van de Koninklijke Zuidnederlandsche Maatschappij voor Taal- en Letterkunde en Geschiednis, 38
- Verhelst, Karel (1985), "Een nieuwe visie op de omvang en indeling van de pagus Hasbania (part 2)", Handelingen van de Koninklijke Zuidnederlandsche Maatschappij voor Taal- en Letterkunde en Geschiednis, 39
- Vanderkindere, Léon (1902), "Chapter 9" (PDF), La formation territoriale des principautés belges au Moyen Age, vol. 2, p. 128

=== Primary sources ===
- Dudo, Historia Normannorum
- Gestorum Abbatem Trudonensium Continuatio Tertia 1007 MGH SS X, p.371 p.382
- Scheffer-Boichorst, Paulus (editor), Chronica Albrici Monachi Trium Fontium, in Monumenta Germaniae Historica: Scriptorum, vol. 23, Hanover, 1874
