= Baudri =

Baudri is a surname. Notable people with the surname include:

- Johann Anton Friedrich Baudri (1804–1893), German Roman Catholic priest
- Friedrich Baudri (1808–1874), German painter and member of the Reichstag

== See also ==
- Baldric (disambiguation), for persons with the given name Baudri (French form of Baldric)
