= List of protected heritage sites in Gingelom =

This table shows an overview of the protected heritage sites in the Flemish town Gingelom. This list is part of Belgium's national heritage.

Object	Status^{?}	Year/architect	Town/section	Address	Coordinates	Number^{?}	Image
Kamerijckhoeve closed farm ^{(nl)}			Gingelom	Kamerijckstraat 11	50.75960°N 5.13339°E	21628 Info	
Closed farm ^{(nl)} ^{(fr)}			Gingelom	Katseistraat 18	50.74820°N 5.12959°E	21629 Info	
Closed farm ^{(nl)} ^{(fr)}			Gingelom	Kriekelstraat 1	50.75149°N 5.13688°E	21630 Info	
Chapel of Our Lady Immaculate-Received ^{(nl)} ^{(fr)}			Gingelom	Landenstraat	50.74803°N 5.12040°E	21631 Info	
Closed farm ^{(nl)} ^{(fr)}			Gingelom	Mgr. Keesenstraat 12	50.75155°N 5.13608°E	21632 Info	
Square Farm ^{(nl)} ^{(fr)}			Gingelom	Opheimstraat 2	50.75246°N 5.13443°E	21634 Info	
Castle of Baron Louis Erasmus Surlet the Chokier ^{(nl)} ^{(fr)}	Yes		Gingelom	Regentwijk 80	50.75081°N 5.12972°E	21635 Info	
St. Peter Parish Church ^{(nl)} ^{(fr)}	Yes		Gingelom	Sint-Pieterstraat 2	50.75038°N 5.13534°E	21636 Info	
section house, double house neoclassical ^{(nl)} ^{(fr)}			Gingelom	Sint-Pieterstraat 1	50.74991°N 5.13488°E	21637 Info	
Rectory ^{(nl)} ^{(fr)}			Gingelom	Steenstraat 2	50.75087°N 5.13535°E	21640 Info	
Closed farm ^{(nl)} ^{(fr)}			Gingelom	Steenstraat 20	50.75232°N 5.13208°E	21641 Info	
St. John's Farm, closed farm ^{(nl)} ^{(fr)}			Gingelom	Steenstraat 29	50.75160°N 5.13166°E	21642 Info	
Closed farm ^{(nl)} ^{(fr)}			Gingelom	Fonteinstraat 16	50.73911°N 5.14037°E	21643 Info	
Parish Church St. Sebastian ^{(nl)} ^{(fr)}			Gingelom	Naamsestraat 33	50.74148°N 5.13958°E	21644 Info	
Closed farm ^{(nl)} ^{(fr)}			Gingelom	Naamsestraat 43	50.74176°N 5.14105°E	21645 Info	
Chapel of Our Lady of Assistance- ^{(nl)} ^{(fr)}			Gingelom	Oude Katsei	50.73986°N 5.14597°E	21647 Info	
Semi-closed farm ^{(nl)} ^{(fr)}			Gingelom	Oude Katsei 76	50.74233°N 5.14074°E	21648 Info	
U-shaped farm complex ^{(nl)} ^{(fr)}			Gingelom	Oude Katsei 77	50.74233°N 5.14279°E	21649 Info	
U-shaped farm complex ^{(nl)} ^{(fr)}			Gingelom	Oude Katsei 79	50.74233°N 5.14279°E	21649 Info	
Farmhouse of 1811 ^{(nl)} ^{(fr)}			Gingelom	Oude Katsei 89	50.74107°N 5.14363°E	21650 Info	
Chapel of Our Lady of Lourdes from 1877 ^{(nl)} ^{(fr)}			Gingelom	Statiestraat	50.74031°N 5.13529°E	21651 Info	
Farm and former distillery ^{(nl)} ^{(fr)}			Gingelom	Bergstraat 11	50.73968°N 5.17777°E	21652 Info	
Farmhouse of 1814 ^{(nl)} ^{(fr)}			Gingelom	Bergstraat 4	50.74162°N 5.18008°E	21653 Info	
Closed farm ^{(nl)} ^{(fr)}			Gingelom	Bergstraat 8	50.74074°N 5.17949°E	21654 Info	
Closed farm ^{(nl)} ^{(fr)}			Gingelom	Bergstraat 10	50.74063°N 5.17823°E	21655 Info	
"Hof Massa" farm ^{(nl)}			Gingelom	Dorpsplein 1	50.74244°N 5.18122°E	21656 Info	
Closed farm ^{(nl)} ^{(fr)}			Gingelom	Dorpsplein 3	50.74211°N 5.18212°E	21657 Info	
Semi-closed farm ^{(nl)} ^{(fr)}			Gingelom	Dorpsplein 5	50.74229°N 5.18242°E	21658 Info	
Watermill (former) ^{(nl)} ^{(fr)}			Gingelom	Molenstraat 3	50.74203°N 5.18371°E	21659 Info	
Semi-closed farm ^{(nl)} ^{(fr)}			Gingelom	Nieuwstraat 13	50.74293°N 5.18425°E	21660 Info	
St. Peter Parish Church ^{(nl)} ^{(fr)}	Yes		Gingelom	Thewitstraat	50.74180°N 5.18109°E	21661 Info	
Chapel of Our Lady of Sorrows-of 1892 ^{(nl)} ^{(fr)}			Gingelom	Thewitstraat	50.73929°N 5.18037°E	21662 Info	
Presbytery, double house ^{(nl)} ^{(fr)}			Gingelom	Thewitstraat 2	50.74155°N 5.18135°E	21663 Info	
Square Farm ^{(nl)} ^{(fr)}			Gingelom	Thewitstraat 10	50.74090°N 5.18271°E	21665 Info	
Closed farm ^{(nl)} ^{(fr)}			Gingelom	Thewitstraat 17	50.73978°N 5.18139°E	21666 Info	
Chapel of Our Lady of Assistance- ^{(nl)} ^{(fr)}			Gingelom	Gravelostraat	50.75159°N 5.18142°E	21667 Info	
Parish St. Trudo ^{(nl)} ^{(fr)}			Gingelom	Sint-Trudostraat 3/2	50.75244°N 5.17628°E	21668 Info	
Presbytery neoclassical double house ^{(nl)} ^{(fr)}			Gingelom	Sint-Trudostraat 1	50.75200°N 5.17595°E	21669 Info	
Home of a former farm complex ^{(nl)} ^{(fr)}			Gingelom	Truilingenstraat 48	50.75344°N 5.17597°E	21670 Info	
Farm Terwing ^{(nl)}			Gingelom	Truilingenstraat 85	50.74864°N 5.17619°E	21671 Info	
St. Anne Chapel ^{(nl)} ^{(fr)}			Gingelom	Daalstraat	50.76250°N 5.21509°E	21672 Info	
Farm "Joris" ^{(nl)}			Gingelom	Daalstraat 12	50.76187°N 5.21310°E	21673 Info	
Parish St. Saturninus ^{(nl)} ^{(fr)}			Gingelom	Kerkstraat 1	50.75544°N 5.21574°E	21674 Info	
Rectory ^{(nl)} ^{(fr)}			Gingelom	Kerkstraat 2	50.75569°N 5.21545°E	21675 Info	
"De Daalhoeve" ^{(nl)}			Gingelom	Truierstraat	50.76054°N 5.21222°E	21676 Info	
Help Holy Cross Chapel ^{(nl)} ^{(fr)}			Gingelom	Kruisstraat 8	50.75934°N 5.17735°E	21678 Info	
Kloosterhoeve (former) ^{(nl)} ^{(fr)}			Gingelom	Truilingenstraat 17	50.76078°N 5.17556°E	21680 Info	
Hassel Castle Pants ^{(nl)} ^{(fr)}	Yes		Gingelom	Hasselbroekstraat 188	50.72203°N 5.20979°E	21682 Info	
St. Jobkapel ^{(nl)} ^{(fr)}			Gingelom	Hasselbroekstraat	50.72063°N 5.21081°E	21683 Info	
Agriculture Gillams Distillery, closed farm ^{(nl)} ^{(fr)}			Gingelom	Hasselbroekstraat 186	50.72360°N 5.20994°E	21684 Info	
Neoclassical house ^{(nl)} ^{(fr)}			Gingelom	Hasselbroekstraat 181	50.72467°N 5.21115°E	21685 Info	
U-shaped farm ^{(nl)} ^{(fr)}			Gingelom	Hasselbroekstraat 213	50.72145°N 5.21147°E	21686 Info	
Farm Stassens or "De Witte Hoeve" ^{(nl)}			Gingelom	Hasselbroekstraat	50.72064°N 5.21142°E	21687 Info	
St. Amands Chapel ^{(nl)} ^{(fr)}			Gingelom	Heiseltstraat	50.73216°N 5.22853°E	21688 Info	
Parish Church of Saint George ^{(nl)} ^{(fr)}	Yes		Gingelom	Houtstraat 60	50.73418°N 5.20924°E	21689 Info	
Snyers distillery, farm and agricultural distillery ^{(nl)} ^{(fr)}			Gingelom	Houtstraat 98	50.73164°N 5.20850°E	21690 Info	
"Lindehoeve" or "Ferme du Tilleul" ^{(nl)}			Gingelom	Houtstraat 65	50.73447°N 5.21026°E	21691 Info	
Distillery Snyers-Goyens, farm and distillery ^{(nl)} ^{(fr)}			Gingelom	Hundelingenstraat 42	50.73962°N 5.20781°E	21693 Info	
Chapel of Our Lady of Little Itch ^{(nl)} ^{(fr)}			Gingelom	Klein-Jeukstraat 26	50.73198°N 5.19131°E	21694 Info	
Mechanical mill (former) ^{(nl)} ^{(fr)}			Gingelom	Spoorwegstraat 36	50.72113°N 5.18820°E	21695 Info	
St. Peter's Parish Church ^{(nl)}			Gingelom	Boekhoutstraat	50.74643°N 5.23351°E	21696 Info	
Classical house ^{(nl)} ^{(fr)}			Gingelom	Boekhoutstraat 7	50.74998°N 5.23502°E	21697 Info	
Farm (former) ^{(nl)} ^{(fr)}			Gingelom	Bosschellestraat 11	50.71683°N 5.13018°E	21698 Info	
St. Martin Parish ^{(nl)}	Yes		Gingelom	Brugstraat	50.72129°N 5.12864°E	21699 Info	
Farmhouse with separate components ^{(nl)} ^{(fr)}			Gingelom	Brugstraat 4	50.72134°N 5.12800°E	21700 Info	
Presbytery, broad style house neotradionele ^{(nl)} ^{(fr)}			Gingelom	Brugstraat 8	50.72114°N 5.12900°E	21701 Info	
Closed farm ^{(nl)} ^{(fr)}			Gingelom	Brugstraat 11	50.72042°N 5.12900°E	21702 Info	
Farmer house ^{(nl)}			Gingelom	Brugstraat 14	50.72047°N 5.12957°E	21703 Info	
Closed farm ^{(nl)} ^{(fr)}			Gingelom	Brugstraat 17	50.72099°N 5.13039°E	21704 Info	
Brewery of 1858 (former) ^{(nl)} ^{(fr)}			Gingelom	Brugstraat 33	50.72265°N 5.13048°E	21705 Info	
Farmhouse with separate components ^{(nl)} ^{(fr)}			Gingelom	Dr. Kempeneersstraat 131	50.71973°N 5.14466°E	21706 Info	
Our Lady Chapel of 1839 ^{(nl)} ^{(fr)}	Yes		Gingelom	sectionstraat	50.72987°N 5.14052°E	21707 Info	
Farm Nerem, water mill on the farm with Jean ^{(nl)} ^{(fr)}	Yes		Gingelom	sectionstraat 11	50.73055°N 5.14179°E	21708 Info	
Farmer house of 1865 ^{(nl)}			Gingelom	Gezusters Dehasquestraat 5	50.72392°N 5.13073°E	21709 Info	
St. Rumoldus Chapel ^{(nl)} ^{(fr)}			Gingelom	Groenplaats	50.71751°N 5.14564°E	21710 Info	
Classicist mansion ^{(nl)} ^{(fr)}			Gingelom	Groenplaats 5	50.71832°N 5.14738°E	21711 Info	
Closed farm ^{(nl)} ^{(fr)}			Gingelom	Groenplaats 6	50.71753°N 5.14661°E	21712 Info	
Closed farm ^{(nl)} ^{(fr)}			Gingelom	Groenplaats 7	50.71753°N 5.14661°E	21712 Info	
Farm with standalone components ^{(nl)} ^{(fr)}			Gingelom	Groenplaats 21	50.71797°N 5.14477°E	21713 Info	
Village house ^{(nl)} ^{(fr)}			Gingelom	Haagstraat 8	50.71997°N 5.14672°E	21714 Info	
Square Farm ^{(nl)} ^{(fr)}			Gingelom	Haagstraat 9	50.71995°N 5.14736°E	21715 Info	
"Bonaertshoeve" hoeve ^{(nl)}			Gingelom	Haagstraat 14	50.72261°N 5.14652°E	21716 Info	
"Blauwe Hoeve" ^{(nl)}			Gingelom	Hannuitstraat 9	50.71938°N 5.12684°E	21718 Info	
Closed farm ^{(nl)} ^{(fr)}			Gingelom	Hannuitstraat 18	50.71764°N 5.12679°E	21719 Info	
Closed farm ^{(nl)} ^{(fr)}			Gingelom	Hannuitstraat 19	50.71764°N 5.12679°E	21719 Info	
Closed farm ^{(nl)} ^{(fr)}			Gingelom	Langstraat 18	50.72161°N 5.13394°E	21722 Info	
Closed farm ^{(nl)} ^{(fr)}			Gingelom	Langstraat 20	50.72161°N 5.13394°E	21722 Info	
Farmer house of 1862 ^{(nl)}			Gingelom	Langstraat 68	50.72124°N 5.13826°E	21723 Info	
Manor house and farm buildings ^{(nl)} ^{(fr)}			Gingelom	Marktplaats 1	50.72137°N 5.12718°E	21724 Info	
Manor house and farm buildings ^{(nl)} ^{(fr)}			Gingelom	Marktplaats 2	50.72137°N 5.12718°E	21724 Info	
Mansion ^{(nl)} ^{(fr)}			Gingelom	Hannuitstraat 4	50.72000°N 5.12678°E	21725 Info	
Closed farm ^{(nl)} ^{(fr)}			Gingelom	Marktplaats 11	50.72089°N 5.12640°E	21726 Info	
"Linthouthoeve", semi-closed farm ^{(nl)}			Gingelom	Montenakenstraat 11	50.72985°N 5.12588°E	21728 Info	
section house, broad eclectic house (former) ^{(nl)}			Gingelom	Peremplaats 1	50.72187°N 5.13161°E	21729 Info	
Closed farm, now two houses ^{(nl)}			Gingelom	Riddersstraat 24	50.72315°N 5.13569°E	21730 Info	
Closed farm ^{(nl)}			Gingelom	Sint-Rumoldusstraat 8	50.71997°N 5.13284°E	21731 Info	
Our Lady of Step Chapel ^{(nl)}			Gingelom	Stepsstraat 1	50.72047°N 5.12498°E	21732 Info	
Mary Magdalene Parish Church ^{(nl)}	Yes		Gingelom	Pastorijstraat	50.70728°N 5.15078°E	21733 Info	
Square Farm ^{(nl)}			Gingelom	Kapelstraat 8	50.70877°N 5.14882°E	21734 Info	
Our Lady Chapel ^{(nl)}			Gingelom	Duivenstraat	50.71216°N 5.13663°E	21736 Info	
Paenhuys or banbrouwerij (former) ^{(nl)} ^{(fr)}			Gingelom	Brouwerijstraat 2	50.70331°N 5.17115°E	21737 Info	
double House ^{(nl)}			Gingelom	Hoogstraat 14	50.70318°N 5.16771°E	21738 Info	
section house of 1893 (former) ^{(nl)} ^{(fr)}			Gingelom	Hoogstraat 17	50.70462°N 5.16985°E	21739 Info	
Presbytery of 1845 ^{(nl)} ^{(fr)}			Gingelom	Hoogstraat 32	50.70453°N 5.17173°E	21740 Info	
Residence ^{(nl)} ^{(fr)}			Gingelom	Hoogstraat 33	50.70520°N 5.17330°E	21741 Info	
Farmstead "Jadoul" ^{(nl)} ^{(fr)}			Gingelom	Hoogstraat 34	50.70419°N 5.17343°E	21742 Info	
Parish Holy Cross ^{(nl)} ^{(fr)}	Yes		Gingelom	Brouwerijstraat	50.70404°N 5.17192°E	21743 Info	
Source of Our Lady Chapel ^{(nl)} ^{(fr)}			Gingelom	Bronstraat	50.75252°N 5.21496°E	83593 Info	
(former) police headquarters ^{(nl)} ^{(fr)}			Gingelom	Brugstraat 16	50.72106°N 5.12939°E	83594 Info	
"Bronhoeve" ^{(nl)}			Gingelom	Bronstraat 9	50.75371°N 5.21285°E	83601 Info	
"Stepshoeve" or "Berwaerhoeve" ^{(nl)}			Gingelom	Stepsstraat 9	50.72017°N 5.12454°E	83767 Info	
The "Drie Tommen" ^{(nl)}	Yes		Gingelom	Drie Tombenstraat	50.70973°N 5.16121°E	200323 Info	More images

== See also ==
- List of onroerend erfgoed in Limburg (Belgium)
- Gingelom
