= Rudolf, son of Nevelong =

Lower Lotharingian Noble

Rudolf or Rodolphe was a Lower Lotharingian noble born into a family with connections to Utrecht. He appears in a single document in 943, when he was a boy. He is nevertheless thought by some modern interpreters to have later acquired lordships in the Hesbaye (Dutch: Haspengouw) region, which is now in Belgium, that later came to be incorporated into the County of Loon (French: Looz).

The one clear 943 record of Rudolf is a grant by his uncle Bishop Balderic of Utrecht to Rudolf's widowed mother, which was analysed by Léon Vanderkindere in a 1900 article. At this time, Rudolf's older brother Balderic was described as a boy (Latin puer) in 956 when he became Bishop of Liège. The places Rudolf stood to inherit an income from after his older brother were goods of the Abbey of "Hereberc" (Sint Odiliënberg): "Rura, Lithorp, Linne, Sulethum, Flothorp, Ascalon, Malicalieol en Curnelo", which are Roer, Lerop, Linne, Swalmen, Vlodrop, Asselt, Melick en Maasniel all near Roermond.

The 943 document makes clear that Rodulf was the younger son of Nevelung, Count of Betuwe, and a daughter of Reginar II, Count of Hainaut, whose name is not known. He therefore had two uncles with the same name as his:

- His mother was sister to Count Rudolf, brother of Count Reginar II.
- His father's brother Rudolf is sometimes considered to have become a cleric, Jongbloed (2006) argued that he must have been a count, and that he certainly had a wife and offspring.

During this period many records give first names only, without specific geographic or family names, so various proposals have been made about how the three Rudolfs correspond to several references to "Count Rudolf" in the surviving records of the 10th century Low Countries.

Joseph Daris, Léon Vanderkindere, and other historians since them, speculate that Rudolf held a County in the Hesbaye. Jean Baerten, writing in the 1960s was also a proponent of this position. Baerten added an argument that young Rudolf might be the Count Rodulfus who appears as the 4th witness in a grant made in 967 by Countess Bertha, the mother of a Count Arnulf, presumed to be Arnulf of Valenciennes. This Bertha was proposed by Vanderkindere to be another child of Nevelung. In contrast, earlier mentions of a Count Rudolf in the same area were thought by Vanderkindere and Baerten to be Rudolf's maternal uncle, Count Rudolf of the Regnarid family.

However, Baerten agreed that Rodulf in Bertha's witness list showed no clear sign of being a count in the area. Instead the evidence points to men named Werner, Emmon, and Eremfried being counts in Haspengouw in this period. Vanderkindere and Baerten proposed that Rodulf inherited Emmon's possessions by marrying his daughter, a proposal based only on the fact that in the next century one of the first known counts of Loon was named Emmo.

More recently, Jongbloed (2008) stated that Rodulf being Bertha's brother in this document is unlikely, because he is only placed in the 4th position. Furthermore, both he and other writers such as van Winter, have pointed out that the distinction made by Vanderkindere and Baerten between the names Emmo and Ehrenfried is not necessary, as one is known to be a short form of the other.

Nevertheless, Baerten's refinement of Vanderkindere is still the standard source, and Rudolf is still routinely proposed to be the father or grandfather of the three brothers found in this area in the next century: Bishop Balderic II of Liège, Count Arnuldus of Haspinga, and Count Gilbert of Loon.

Because of the incomplete records available, there is considerable uncertainty as to whether Giselbert, Count of Looz, was the son of Rudolf, which no old record suggests, or the son of an otherwise unknown person named in one much later record as Otto, Count of Looz.

== Sources ==
- Baerten (1965), "Les origines des comtes de Looz et la formation territoriale du comté (suite et fin)", Revue belge de philologie et d'histoire, 43 (4)
- Jongbloed, Hein H. (2006), "Immed "von Kleve" (um 950) : Das erste Klevische Grafenhaus (ca, 885 - ca. 1015) als Vorstufe des geldrischen Fürstentums" (PDF), Annalen des historischen Vereins für den Niederrhein, doi:10.7788/annalen.2006.209.1.13, S2CID 180819126
- Jongbloed (2008), "Flamenses in de elfde eeuw", Bijdragen en Mededelingen Gelre
- Jongbloed, Hein H., (2009) "Listige Immo en Herswind. Een politieke wildebras in het Maasdal (938-960) en zijn in Thorn rustende dochter", Jaarboek. Limburgs Geschied- en Oudheidkundig Genootschap vol. 145 (2009) p. 9-67
- Souvereyns; Bijsterveld (2008), "Deel 1: De graven van Loon", Limburg - Het Oude Land van Loon
- Vaes, Jan (2016), De Graven van Loon. Loons, Luiks, Limburgs, ISBN 9789059087651
- Vanderkindere, Léon (1900), "A propos d´une charte de Baldéric d'Utrecht", Académie royale de Belgique Bulletin de la Classe des Lettres et des Sciences Morales et Politiques
- Vanderkindere, Léon (1902) La Formation territoriale des principautés belges au Moyen Âge, Bruxelles, H. Lamertin,
- van Winter, (1981) Ansfried en Dirk, twee namen uit de Nederlandse geschiedenis van de 10e en 11e eeuw link
