= Baudrit =

Baudrit is a surname. Notable people with the surname include:

- Fernando Baudrit Solera (1907–1975), Costa Rican jurist
- Lore Baudrit (born 1991), French ice hockey player

== See also ==
- Baudri
