= Willibrord Benzler =

German Roman Catholic bishop (1853–1921)

His Excellency Willibrord Benzler
- Bishop of Metz
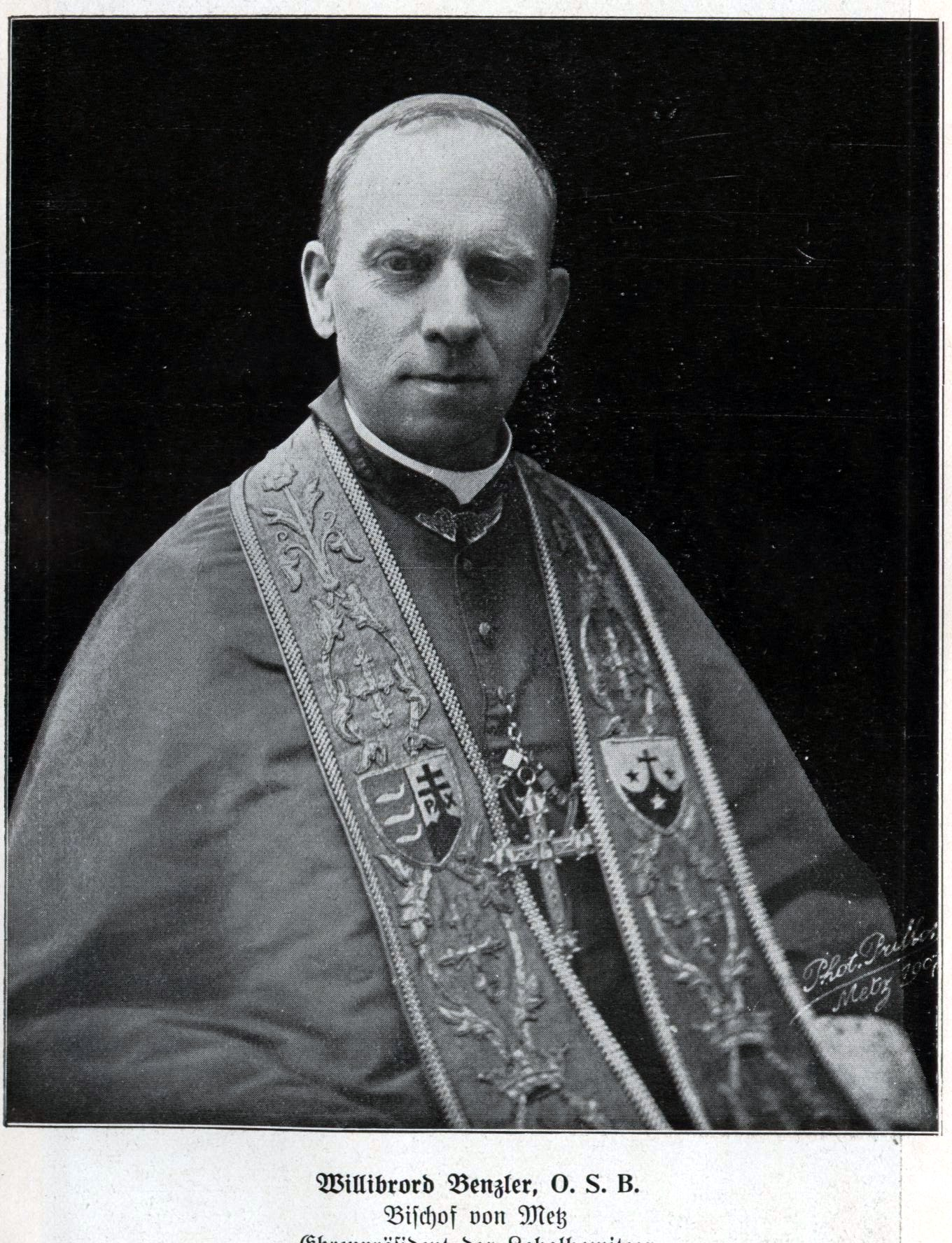
- Willibrord Benzler, 1913
- Diocese: Metz
- Appointed: 8 September 1901
- Term ended: 10 July 1919
- Predecessor: François Fleck
- Successor: Jean-Baptiste Pelt

Orders
- Ordination: 28 August 1877 by Johann Anton Friedrich Baudri
- Consecration: 28 October 1901 by Michael Felix Korum

Personal details
- Born: Karl Heinrich Johann Eugen Benzler; 16 October 1853 Niederhemer, Westphalia
- Died: 16 April 1921 (aged 67) Baden-Baden

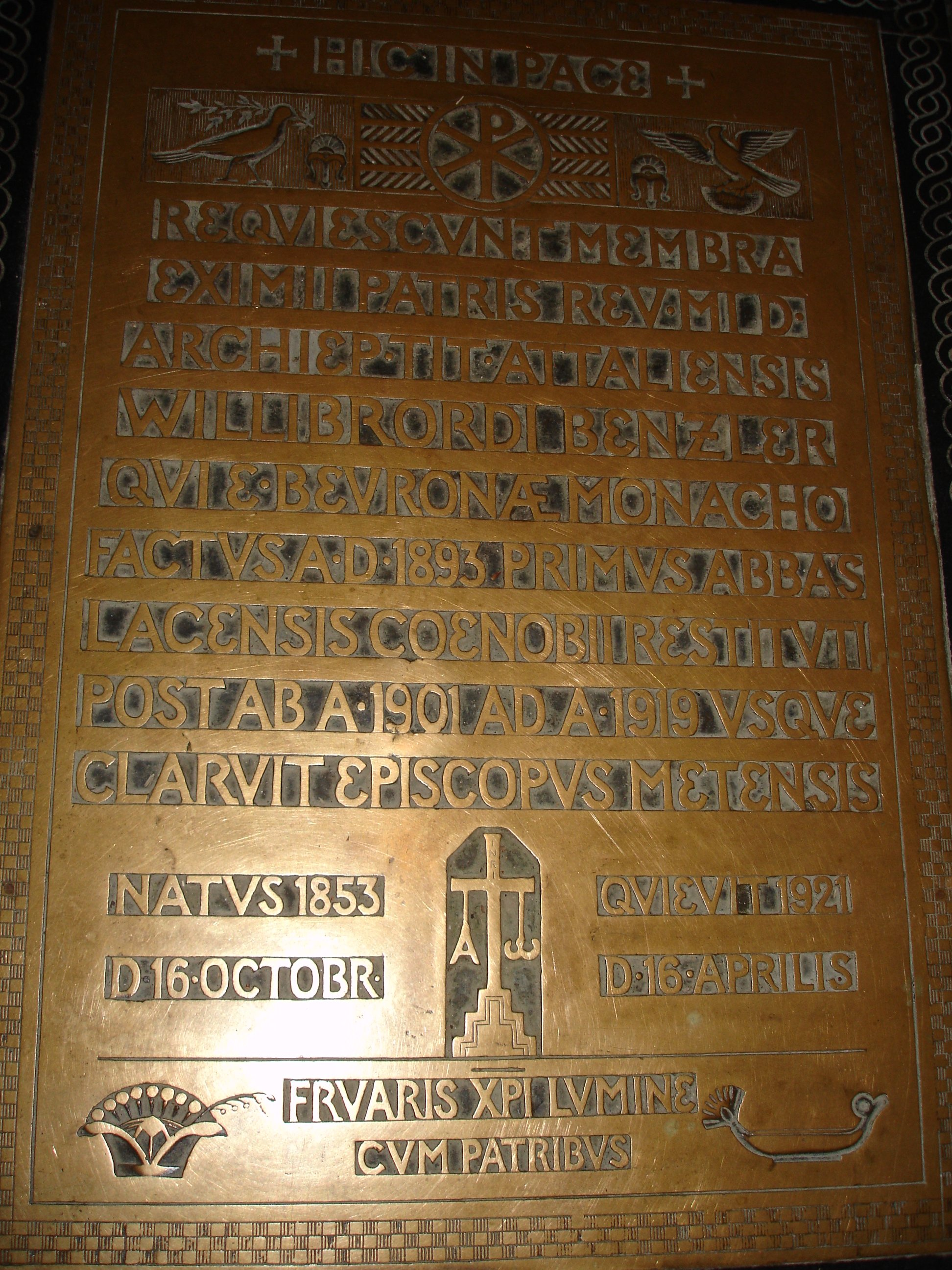
Grave within St. Martin's church at Beuron Archabbey

Willibrord Benzler OSB (16 October 1853 – 16 April 1921) was the Roman Catholic Bishop of Metz from 1901 to 1919.

== Life ==
Born as Karl Heinrich Johann Eugen Benzler in Niederhemer, Westphalia, the eldest son of Karl Benzler, an innkeeper, and his wife, Klementine (née Kissing), he was baptized at SS Peter and Paul Church on 24 October 1853. After attending the elementary school in Niederhemer and the höhere Bürgerschule in Menden, he went on to study at the secondary school in Attendorn, and (from 1867 to 1871) at the gymnasium Paulinium in Münster, where he graduated.

After beginning to study architecture in Cologne, in December 1871 he changed to study philosophy and Catholic theology at the University of Innsbruck. In the autumn of 1872 he joined the Collegium Canisianum maintained by the Jesuits; however, his application to join the order was denied in 1874. Instead he joined the Benedictine abbey of Beuron and chose the name Willibrord. On 28 August 1877 he was ordained to the priesthood by Johann Baudri, auxiliary bishop of Cologne.

During the Kulturkampf the monks of Beuron were forced to leave the country. From 1875 to 1880 they stayed in Volders (Tyrol). In 1880 they were invited to revive the Emaus Abbey in Prague. From 1883 to 1887 he was prior of Seckau Abbey in Styria, which had been revived as a priory of Beuron. In 1887 the monks were able to return to their monastery in Beuron, where he became prior. In 1892 Maria Laach Abbey was refounded by the monks of Beuron, and Willibrord Benzler became its prior. On 15 October 1893 the priory was made an abbey, and he became the first abbot. On 8 December he was consecrated as abbot by Wilhelm von Reiser, Bishop of Rottenburg.

Even though Benzler had earlier been discussed as a possible bishop of Cologne or Fulda, his appointment as bishop of Metz on 21 September 1901 was somewhat surprising. He was ordained on 28 October 1901 by Michael Felix Korum, bishop of Trier.

After World War I, the diocese of Metz became French again, and a German bishop was no longer acceptable; Benzler therefore resigned in January 1919. His resignation was officially accepted on 10 July; on 31 July he was appointed archbishop of the titular see of Attalia in Pamphylia. He returned to his abbey in Maria Laach and later to Beuron, but a serious heart disease forced him to move to the Cistercian abbey of Lichtenthal near Baden-Baden to receive medical help. In 1921 he died there, and was buried at his first abbey in Beuron.

== Coat of arms ==
Coat of arms of Bishop Benzler

The bishopric coat of arms of Willibrord Benzler showed on the heraldic right side three silver fish on blue ground, while to the left it had a red cross of Lorraine with the word "PAX" (peace). The origin of the three hills to the bottom of the cross is unknown, they might have been a reference to his hometown in the hills of the Sauerland. Below the shield is the motto of Bishop Benzler, "In verbo tuo" (Following your word).

== Sources ==
- Biographisch-Bibliographisches Kirchenlexikon article (in German)

== Publications ==
- Benzler, Willibrord (1922). Bihlmeyer, Pius (ed.). Erinnerungen aus meinem Leben (in German). Kunstverlag Beuron.
