= Balderic I of Liège =

Baldrick I was bishop of Liège and abbot of Lobbes from 955 until his death on 29 July 959.

Balderic appears in a 943 charter made in his favour by his paternal uncle Balderic, which was studied by Joseph Daris in 1896 and Léon Vanderkindere in 1900, leading to the following conclusions:

- His mother who is not named in the charter was a sister of Reginar III, Count of Hainaut.
- His mother's father was also named Reginar, and, we know from this document, was already dead in 943.
- His father was Count Nevelung, who was also already dead in 943.
- His father's brother, also named Balderic, was bishop of Utrecht from 918 to 975. He was able to grant the use of lands near Sint-Odiliënberg to the support of Nevelung's family.
- He had a younger brother named Rudolf, who was to receive benefit from the grant after his mother and elder brother died.

Against royal wishes he was made a bishop whilst still a child in place of his predecessor Rathier (bishop from 953 to 955). According to Rathier's own published complaints, Balderic gained the position thanks to the support of his father's brother Bishop Balderic, and two other uncles, Count Reginar and Ruduolt, who is normally equated to Rudolf the brother of Reginar who was named by Flodoard as a rebel in 944.

== Sources ==
- (in Dutch) Bijsterveld, Arnoud-Jan (2015) 'Machts- en territoriumvorming: van Karolingische kernregio tot territoriale lappendeken, 900-1200' in: Limburg. Een geschiedenis, tot 1500 (Limburgs Geschied- en Oudheidkundig Genootschap (LGOG) Maastricht)
- Daris, Joseph (1896) ‘Notes sur l’origine des deux Balderic, evêques de Liège’, Notices historiques sur les églises du diocèse de Liège 16 105-112.
- Vanderkindere, Léon (1900) ‘A propos d´une charte de Baldéric d’Utrecht’, Académie royale de Belgique Bulletin de la Classe des Lettres et des Sciences Morales et Politiques (Bruxelles),

Catholic Church titles
Preceded by Ratherius	Bishop of Liège; 955–959	Succeeded by Eraclus
