= Rudolf, Count of Avernas =

10th century noble in Lower Lotharingia

Count Rudolf (living 944), was a count in Lower Lotharingia, who held at least one comital office the region of present-day Belgian and Dutch Limburg. Counties called Avernas and Huste belonged to a count or counts named Rudolf in this period.

It has also traditionally been proposed that he was one person and that the same as Rudolf the brother of Reginar III and son of Reginar II, Count of Hainaut, and thus a member of the so-called Regnarid dynasty.

However, there are no records which associate that Rudolf clearly with any specific geographical area,

== Attestations of the brother of Reginar ==
Rudolf the brother of Reginar III is only clearly mentioned in one specific record, concerning the time when their uncle Gilbert, Duke of Lorraine, who was senior member of their family was killed in 939 at the Battle of Andernach, and King Otto the Great took firm control of Lotharingia. Flodoard reported that in 944, Rudolf and his brother were allied with King Louis IV of France, and Hugh the Great, Duke of the Franks. Otto requested that Herman I, Duke of Swabia, lay siege to the castle of "Reginar and his brother Rudolf" and quell the rebellion.

Another possible record comes from a later period, where Reginar is associated with a count Rodwold. The two men were both uncles of the same person. Bishop Ratherius wrote his Phrenesis to defend the position he lost as Bishop of Liège, and one of his claims was that his replacement Balderic I (bishop 956–9), had benefited from nepotism, being the nephew of Counts "Regeneri atque Ruoduolti", and the son of the brother of Bishop Balderic of Utrecht. This Rodwold has traditionally been equated to the Rodulf the brother of Reginar mentioned by Floduard.

It is generally accepted that it is the same two brothers who appear next to each other ("Rudolfus comes, Reginherus comes") in a charter by King Otto in 949, confirming the Abbey of Susteren on the Meuse to be a possession of Prüm abbey.

== Rudolfs in Limburg ==
10th-century charters show that one or more nobles named Rudolf held territory on the left bank of the Meuse, and also the County of Avernas (though none of these charters give genealogical information).

- Approximately 946, a charter mentions "villa lens in comitatu avernae temporibus rodulphi comitis" (Villa Lens in the County of Avernas under the rule of Count Rodulphe). Lens is the name of two neighbouring villages near the town of Avernas-le-Baudoin.
- In a charter of 7 Oct 950, Kessel on the left bank of the Meuse (Dutch: Maas) between Roermond and Venlo is described as being "in pago Masalant in comitatu Ruodolfi" (in the country of Maasland, in the county of Rudolf).
- 4 Jul 952. Alden-Eyck near Maaseik is described as being "in pago Huste in comitatu Ruodulphi" (in the country of Huste, in the county of Rudolf). Huste and Hufte are generally assumed to be the same, and are sometimes considered to be related to the place Hocht in Lanaken, also on the Maas but approximately 30km southwards. On the other hand, Van de Weerd has proposed it was Hoeselt. Wherever it was, it must have been seat of a count.
- The only other mention of both Huste and Avernas, from the same approximate period, is geographically distant from Hocht or Hoeselt, but close to Borgloon, the future seat of the county of Loon. It mentions a land-holder named Rodulf, but he is not described as a count, only a neighbour. This land exchange record, dated between 927 and 964, and probably around 950, mentioned the places, Muizen (nl) and Buvingen (nl) (both in Gingelom), and Heusden being in Avernas; and Heers and Engelmanshoven as being in a county called "Hufte", or Huste. The two groups of places are noted by Baerten, Verhelst and others as being close, but separated by the old medieval deaconry boundaries of St Truiden and Tongeren, and in the 11th century probably also the boundaries between the counties of Duras and Loon ran in a similar way.

== After 958 ==
It has traditionally been argued, for example by Léon Vanderkindere, that Count Rudolf in Limburg must have been expelled from power like this supposed brother Reginar. In 958, Reginar III was defeated by King Lothair and Archbishop Bruno and banished to Bavaria. Rudolf is not explicitly mentioned in this regard, but at about that same time, a noble named Werner appears as under-advocate (subadvocatus) of the Abbey of St Truiden, a position that would in later centuries be held by a count with a jurisdiction near the area near the Abbey.

Vanderkindere argued that because a Count Rudolf had been count in Avernas, which is near Sint-Truiden, and because a Count Werner also appears in this time holding a county in Hainaut, where he would later be killed by the Reginars. It is thought likely that Bruno replaced Rudolf as count with Werner around 958. The main documentary evidence is that in 966, a charter states that a noble named Rudolf's property at Gelmen (between St Truiden and Borgloon) had been confiscated because of his infidelity and was now in the county of Werner in the pagus of Hesbaye.

Any wives or children that Rudolf might have had are not known from any clear records. It is known that in similar areas to Rudolf's and his brother's lordships Werner (or Garnier) appears as count after 953. In 973 however, the sons of Reginar III, Reginar IV and his brother Lambert, returned and killed Werner and his brother Renaud. Rudolf's nephews then established themselves in the counties of Hainaut and Louvain. It was proposed by Leon Vanderkindere that the related family of Nevelong, Count of Betuwe, who married a sister of Rudolf and had a son with her named Rudolf, played a more lasting role in the Hesbaye area, both during and after the time of Werner. One Count in particular who may be a member of that family was named Eremfried, and a Count Emmo (who replaced Rudolf in Gelmen) might be the same person.

- A charter dated 24 Jan 966, mentions grants to the Abbey of Nivelles a Count Reginar, and a son of his called Liechard (or Liethard), who gave Gingelom, in Hesbaye. A Count Rudolf also appears in that charter, but he is not described as a relative and Lentlo, which he granted, is Lillois (fr) south of Brussels, and not (as Vanderkindere thought) the same as Lens near Avernas.
- Counts Eremfridus and Rodulfus, appear as witnesses in a grant by Bertha, the mother of a Count Arnulf, of land in Brustem (later belonging to Loon) to St Truiden. Bertha is thought by modern historians to be a daughter of Nevelung, thus a niece of Rudolf, and her son Count Arnulf was count of the March of Valenciennes.

Perhaps there was a final mention of Rudolf in 982, according to Jongbloed. In a charter made in Capua, 26 July 982, "on the day that we fight the Saracens" Otto II certified that if a certain "Cunradus, son of the late count Rudolf" died, he wanted his possessions in Lotharingia to go to Gorze Abbey, and these included "curtis Velm in pago Haspongowe et in comitate Eremfridi comitis". In the Battle of Cotrone itself (13 July 982, so it had already happened) it seems that both this Conrad, and this count Eremfried, lost their lives. Velm, now part of St Truiden, did come under Gorze Abbey, and a Count Irimfrid was recorded as dying in the battle. However, this Conrad's possessions were widespread, and on the basis of those Vanderkindere (1902 pp.340-1) believes his father was Rodolphe Count of Ivois. Of this Count however, Vanderkindere (p.342) says that given his connection to Velm it is "not without some likelihood" that he is a member of the Regnarid family, where the name Rodolphe was familiar.

In the 11th century, Balderic II of Liège, brother of Gilbert the first recorded Count of Loon, was recorded as being a relative to Count Arnulf of Valenciennes, as well as the Regnarid Lambert I, Count of Louvain. In this way at least, it is clear that the later Counts of Loon were related to Rudolf.

== Sources ==
- Bachrach, Bernard S. and Fanning, Steven (Editors), The Annals of Flodard of Reims, 919-966, University of Toronto Press, Toronto, 2004
- Baerten, J (1962), "Le comté de Haspinga et l'avouerie de Hesbaye (IXe-XIIe siècles)", Revue belge de philologie et d'histoire, 40 (4): 1149–1167, doi:10.3406/rbph.1962.2438
- Baerten (1965), "Les origines des comtes de Looz et la formation territoriale du comté (suite et fin)", Revue belge de philologie et d'histoire, 43 (4)
- Baerten, Jean (1969), Het Graafschap Loon (11de - 14de eeuw) (PDF)
- Jongbloed, Hein H.. (2009) "Listige Immo en Herswind. Een politieke wildebras in het Maasdal (938-960) en zijn in Thorn rustende dochter", Jaarboek. Limburgs Geschied- en Oudheidkundig Genootschap vol. 145 (2009) p. 9–67
- Parisot, Robert (1898), Le Royaume de Lorraine sous les Carolingiens also on google books.
- Van de Weerd (1947), "De herkomst van Loon (Vervolg en slot)", Limburg, 27: 48
- Verhelst, Karel (1984), "Een nieuwe visie op de omvang en indeling van de pagus Hasbania (part 1)", Handelingen van de Koninklijke Zuidnederlandsche Maatschappij voor Taal- en Letterkunde en Geschiednis, 38
- Verhelst, Karel (1985), "Een nieuwe visie op de omvang en indeling van de pagus Hasbania (part 2)", Handelingen van de Koninklijke Zuidnederlandsche Maatschappij voor Taal- en Letterkunde en Geschiednis, 39
- Vanderkindere, Léon (1902), "Chapter 9" (PDF), La formation territoriale des principautés belges au Moyen Age, vol. 2, p. 128
