= Kerkom-bij-Sint-Truiden =

- Village
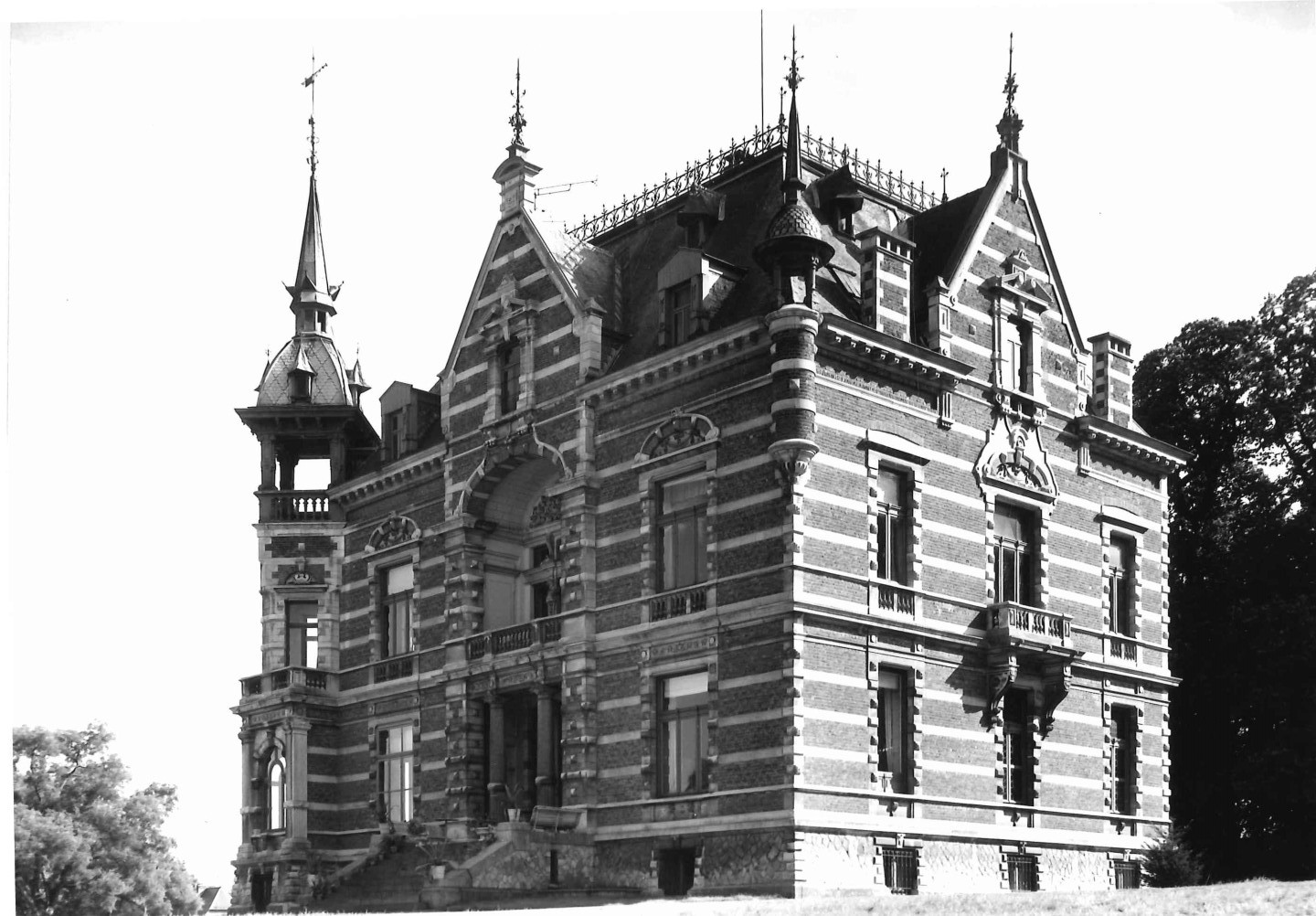
- Castle of Kerkom (1975)

- Location in Belgium
- Coordinates: 50.7729°N 5.1804°E
- Country: Belgium
- Community: Flemish Community
- Province: Limburg
- Municipality: Sint-Truiden

Area
  - Total: 4.62 km^{2} (1.78 sq mi)

Population (2021)
  - Total: 611
  - Density: 132/km^{2} (343/sq mi)
- Time zone: CET

Kerkom-bij-Sint-Truiden (or simply Kerkom) is a village in the Sint-Truiden municipality of the Limburg province in the Flemish Community of Belgium. Kerkom-bij-Sint-Truiden was an independent municipality until 1970 when it merged with Borlo. In 1976, the village opted to become part of Sint-Truiden.

== History ==
The village was first mentioned in 1065 as Kyreheim. The village was a heerlijkheid in the County of Loon. In the late 14th century until 1675, the village was a possession of the Van Alsteren family.

The Castle of Kerkhom was first mentioned in 1396. In the 18th Century, the van Schoor family built a classical castle on the site. In 1889, an eclectic castle was built to the north-east. Most of the older castle was demolished except for the towers and one wing. The castle is currently in use by a fruit company.

Kerkom-bij-Sint-Truiden is a rural village on the Cicindria Brook. It was an independent community until 1970, when it merged into Borlo. In 1976, it was decided to merge Borlo into Gingelom, however Kerkom protested and joined Sint-Truiden.

== Beer ==
In 1878, the Kerkom Brewery was founded by Evarist Clerinx. The brewery could no longer compete, and closed in 1968. Jean Clerinx retired in 1988, and started brewing again. His new beer Bink became successful, and the brewery started exporting to the United States. When Eleven Madison Park was proclaimed the best restaurant in the world, it was revealed that they served Bink.

== Chapel of the Brown-Our-Lady ==
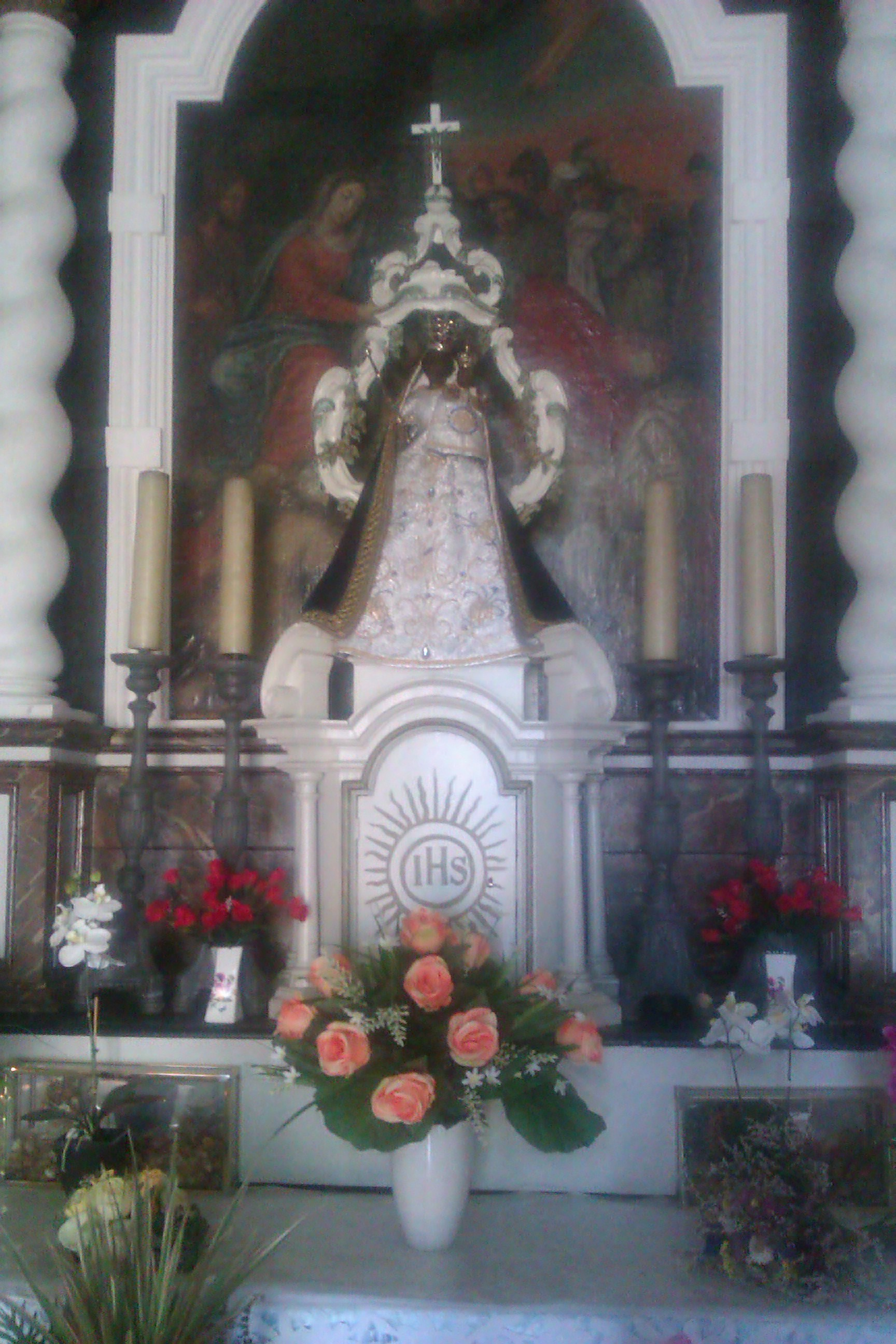
The statue inside the Chapel of the Brown-Our-Lady

The Chapel of the Brown-Our-Lady is a little chapel near Kerkom-bij-Sint-Truiden.

According to the legend, an unbaptist child of an inhabitant of Kerkom died, and after praying to Mary, the child miraculously came back to life. When neighbouring Montenaken was struck by a typhoid epidemic, the statue of Our Lady was taken from Kerkom to Montenaken. After the epidemic had subsided, the inhabitants refused to return the statue, however the statue returned on her own accord.

The chapel has become a pilgrimage site on Our Lady of the Assumption (15 August).

== Notable people ==
- August Mortelmans (1901–1985), racing cyclist.
