= Baldric (disambiguation) =

A baldric is a shoulder belt used to carry a weapon.

Baldric (also spelled Balderic or Baldrick, in French Baudri or Baudry) is a masculine Germanic given name. It may refer to:

- Balderic of Montfaucon, a 7th-century French abbot and saint
- Baldric of Friuli, a 9th-century Duke of Friuli
- Balderic of Utrecht, bishop of Utrecht (917–975)
- Balderic I of Liège, bishop (955–959)
- Balderic II of Liège, bishop (1008–1018)
- Baldric of Noyon, bishop of Tournai (1099–1112)
- Baldric of Dol (c. 1050–1130), abbot of Bourgueil
- Balderic of Florennes (d. c. 1163), biographer
- Baldric (horse), (1961–1986) a Thoroughbred racehorse
- Baldrick, several characters played by Tony Robinson on the BBC series Blackadder
- Baldrick the Rat King, the main character in the game Conan Exiles

== See also ==
- St. Baldrick's Foundation, a US cancer research charity
