= Friedrich Baudri =

German painter

Peter Ludwig Friedrich Baudri (20 April 1808 in Elberfeld (today part of Wuppertal) – 6 October 1874 in Cologne) was a German painter and member of Reichstag.

His brother was Johann Anton Friedrich Baudri, the Vicar General of the Roman Catholic Archdiocese of Cologne and the auxiliary bishop of Cologne.

== Bibliography ==
- Johann Jacob Merlo und Eduard Firmenich-Richartz: Kölnische Künstler in alter und neuer Zeit. Schwann, Düsseldorf 1895 (Publikationen der Gesellschaft für Rheinische Geschichtskunde, Band 9)
- Wilhelm Kosch: Das katholische Deutschland. Vol. 1, Haas & Grabherr, Augsburg 1933
- Robert Steimel: Kölner Köpfe. Steimel, Köln 1958
- Bernhard Mann: Biographisches Handbuch für das preußische Abgeordnetenhaus (1867–1918). Droste, Düsseldorf 1988, ISBN 3-7700-5146-7 (= Handbücher zur Geschichte des Parliamentarismus und der Politischen Parteien, Band 3)
