= Reginar II of Hainaut =

Count of Hainaut and Lotharingian magnate (890–932)

Reginar II
- Count of Hainaut
- Born: 890
- Died: 932 (aged 42)
- Noble family: Reginar
- Spouse: Adelaide of Burgundy
- Issue: Reginar III, Count of Hainaut; Rudolph, Count of the Maasgau; Liéthard
- Father: Reginar, Duke of Lorraine
- Mother: Hersinda

Reginar (or Rainier) II (890–932) was Lotharingian magnate who was active from approximately 915 to 932. He was brother of Duke Gilbert of Lotharingia, who died at the Battle of Andernach in 939, and because his son and grandson claimed it, he probably already personally held the fort of Mons in Hainaut as the seat of a county.

== History ==
He was the son of Reginar I Longneck, and this means his paternal grandmother was possibly a daughter of Charles the Bald and Ermentrude.

Flodoard's Annals, reports under the year 924 that Reginar the brother of Duke Gilbert of Lotharingia already had a son who was given as a hostage during conflicts between several of the Lotharingian magnates of the time.

By 943 he was dead, as evidenced by a charter made in favor of his widowed daughter partly as atonement for his sins.

== Family ==
Reginar II had at least three children with Adelaide, daughter of Richard, Duke of Burgundy:

- Reginar III, Count of Hainaut
- Rudolf, possibly a Count in the Hesbaye
- Possibly Liethard or Liechard, a son mentioned in one 966 charter as a son of a Count Reginar.
- A daughter who married to Nibelung, Count of Betuwe.

Upon his death, Reginar was succeeded as Count of Hainaut by his son and namesake.

| Preceded by Reginar I | Count of Hainaut; 915–932 | Succeeded by Reginar III |
