= Eucherius of Orléans =

Bishop of Orleans (c. 687–743)

Saint Eucherius of Orléans
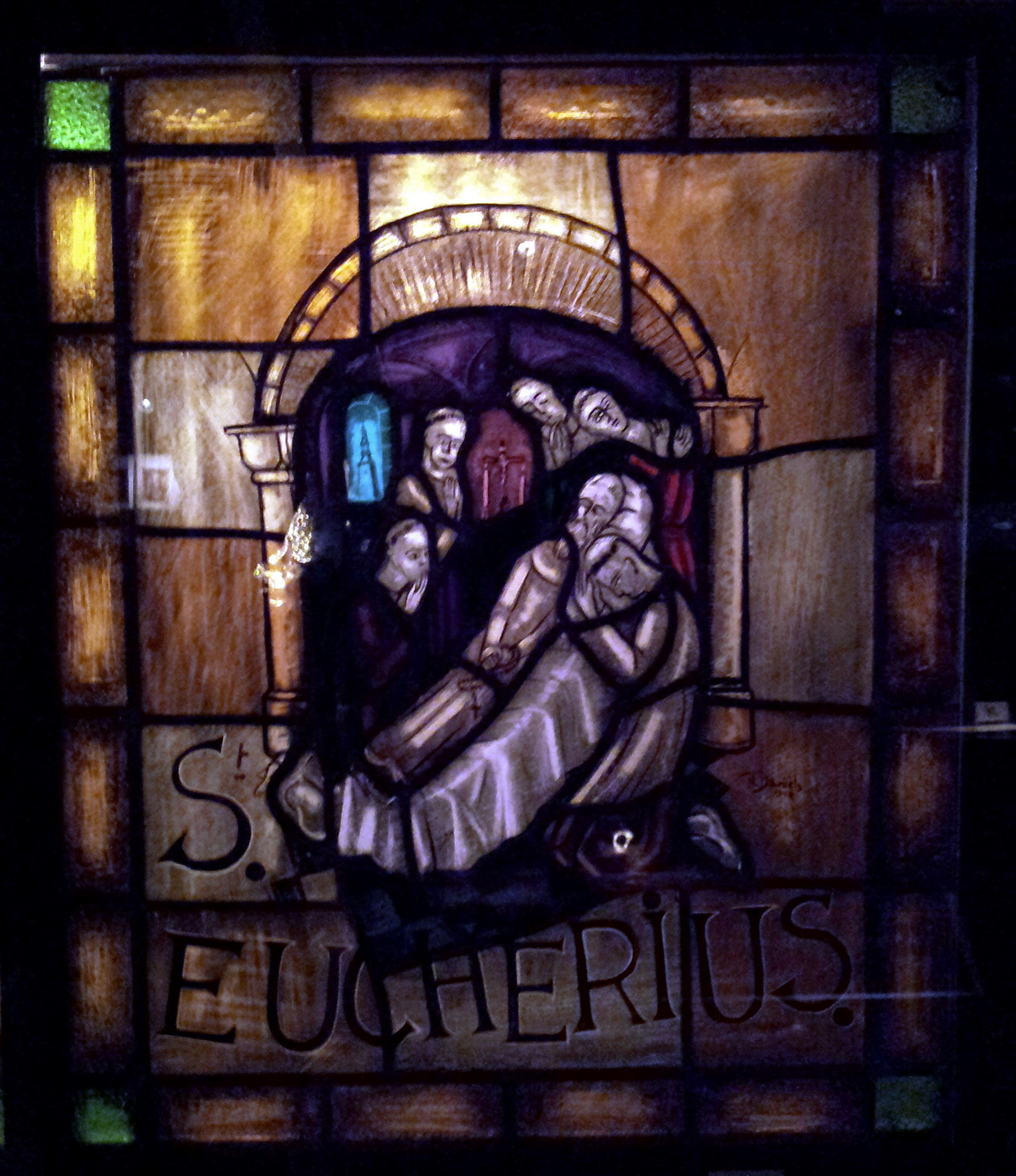
- Death of Saint Eucherius, stained glass window in the treasury of Our Lady Church, Sint-Truiden
- Born: c. 687 AD; Orléans, France
- Died: 743 AD; Sint-Truiden, Belgium
- Venerated in: Roman Catholic Church Eastern Orthodox Church
- Feast: February 20

Saint Eucherius of Orléans (c. 687 in Orléans – February 20, 743 AD), nephew of Suavaric, bishop of Auxerre, was Bishop of Orléans.

Reading the letters of Paul the Apostle led Eucherius to seek the monastic life in 714, when he retired to the Abbey of Jumièges in the Diocese of Rouen. After seven years his uncle, Suavaric, Bishop of Orléans, died. The reputation of his virtue must have been very great, for a deputation was sent to Charles Martel, then mayor of the palace, who practically governed the Frankish Kingdom, to beg that Eucherius might be elected to the vacant see. Despite his dislike of the idea he consented to their request and became bishop in 721.

Having opposed the elevation of Charles Martel and the latter's confiscation of church property to fund his war efforts against the Moorish invasions from Al-Andalus, Eucherius found himself out of favor with the new Carolingian dynasty. When Charles Martel returned from his victory at the Battle of Tours, he stopped in Orléans and exiled Eucherius to Cologne. Eucherius retired to the abbey of Sint-Truiden, where he spent the remainder of his life in prayer and contemplation until his death in 743.

== Vision of St. Eucherius ==
Hincmar of Reims reported to a Council of Quierzy in 858, a vision that Bishop Eucherius of Orléans had seen during the reign of King Pepin III over a century before. While at prayer, Eucherius had been taken up and shown, among other things, the sufferings of those in hell, among whom he saw Charles Martel. When the vision ended, he called Boniface and Fulrad, abbot of Saint-Denis, and sent to them to see whether Charles was in his tomb. When the two opened the tomb a dragon rushed out, and they found the tomb's interior blackened as though burned. These two signs were taken as evidence that the vision had been accurate and that Charles had been condemned to hell for his despoliation of Church property.

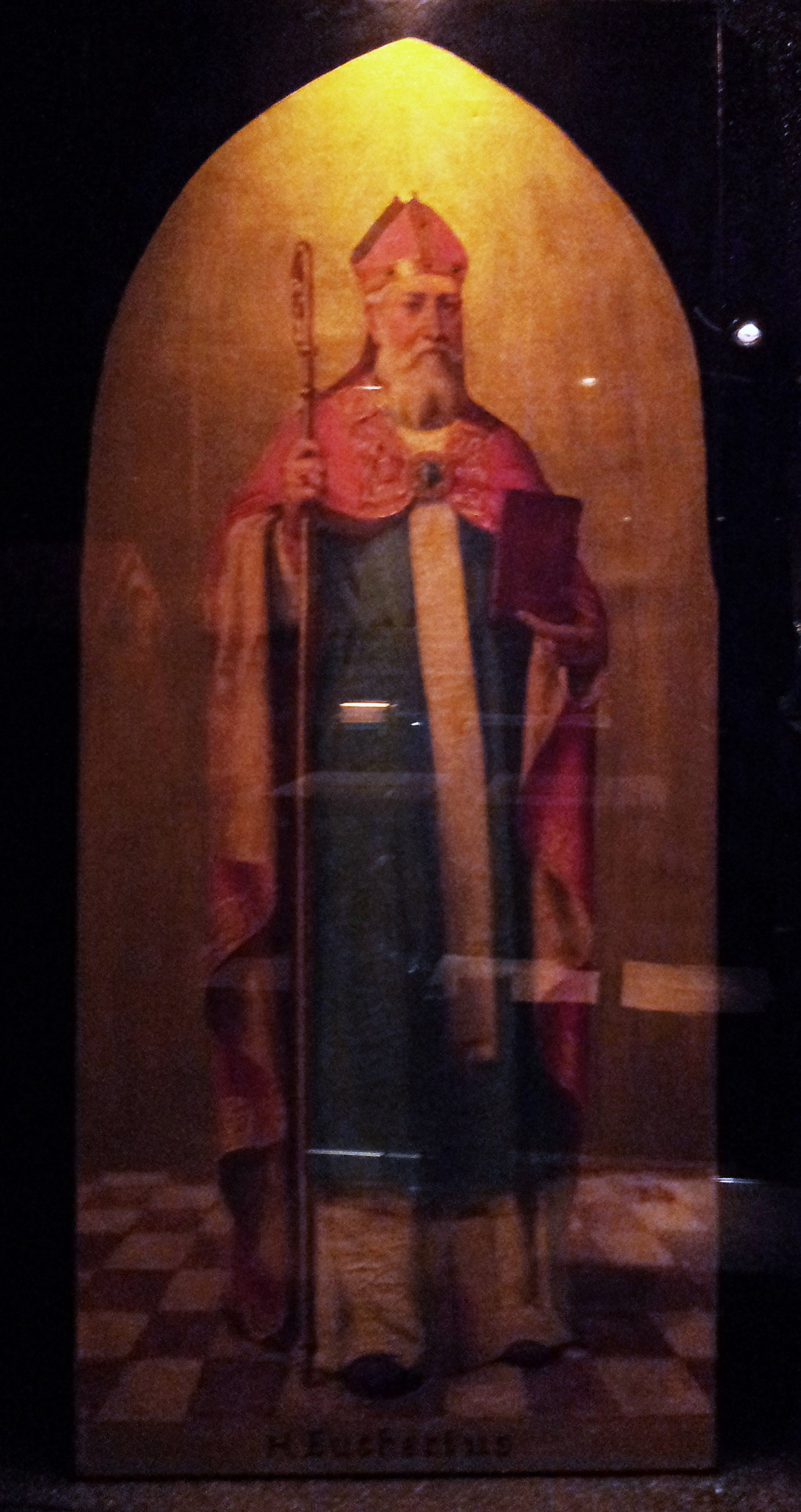
Painting on woodpanel, Church of Our Lady, Sint-Truiden

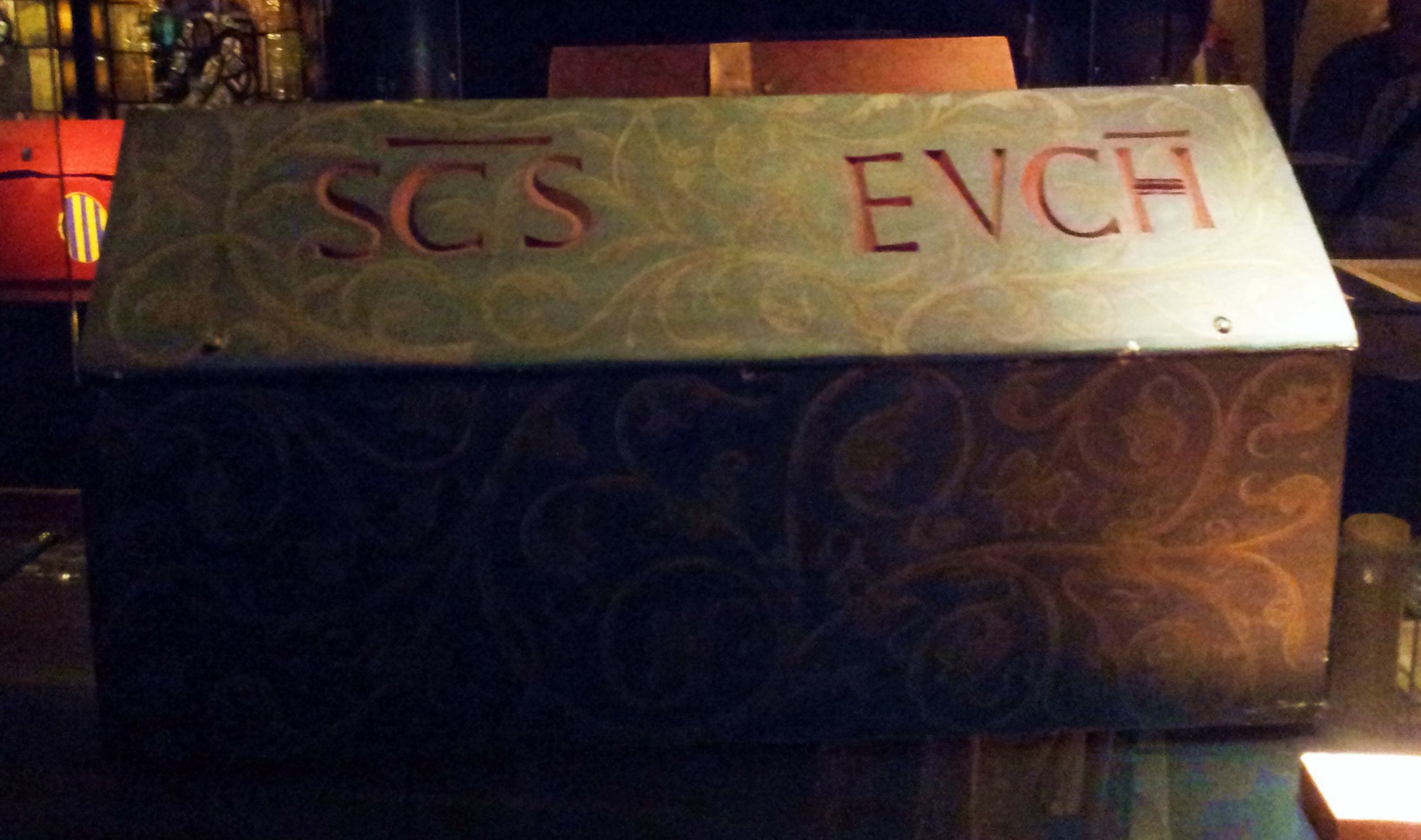
Reliquairy chest, Church of Our Lady, Sint-Truiden

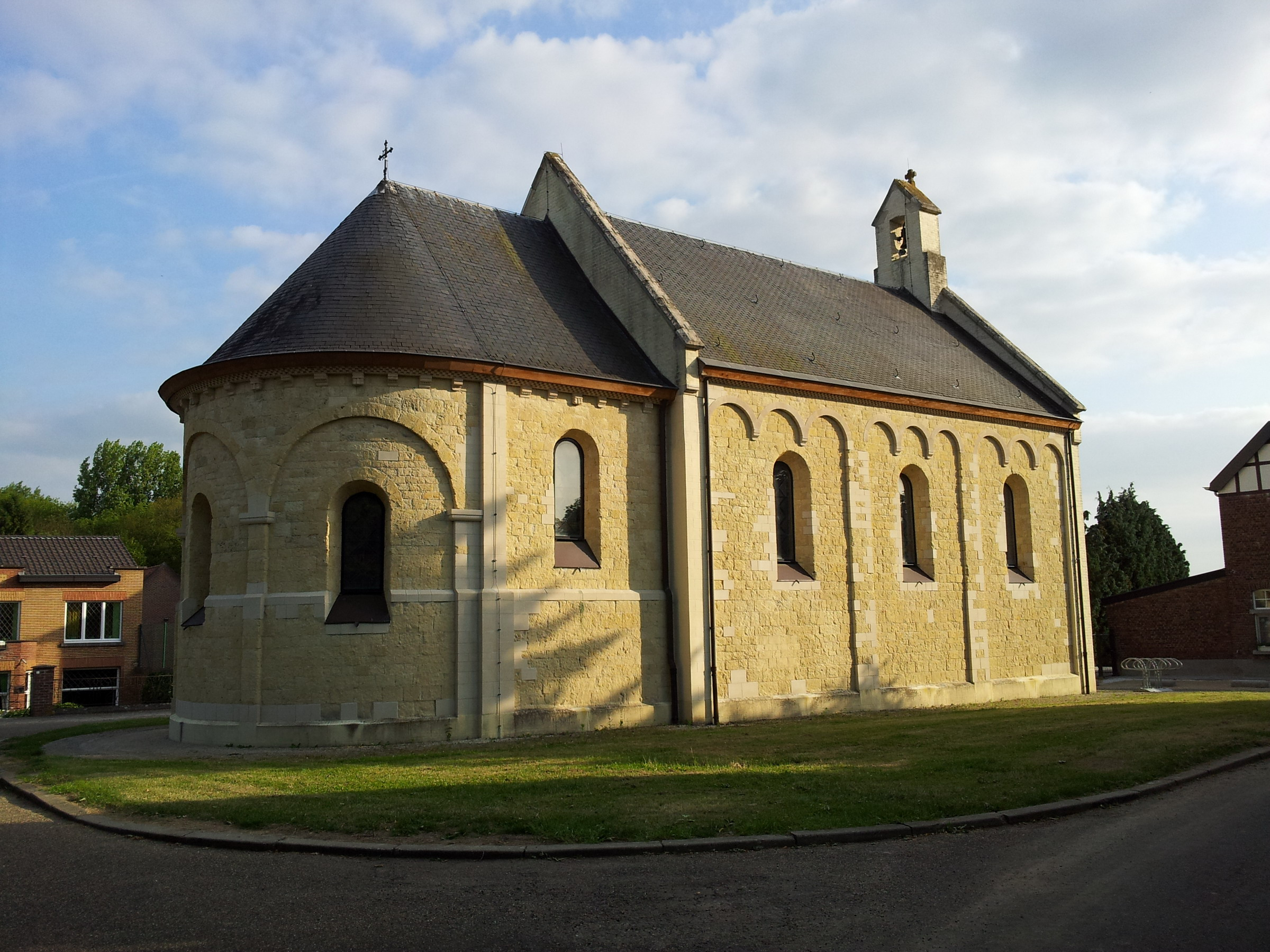
St-Eucherius chapel, Brustem

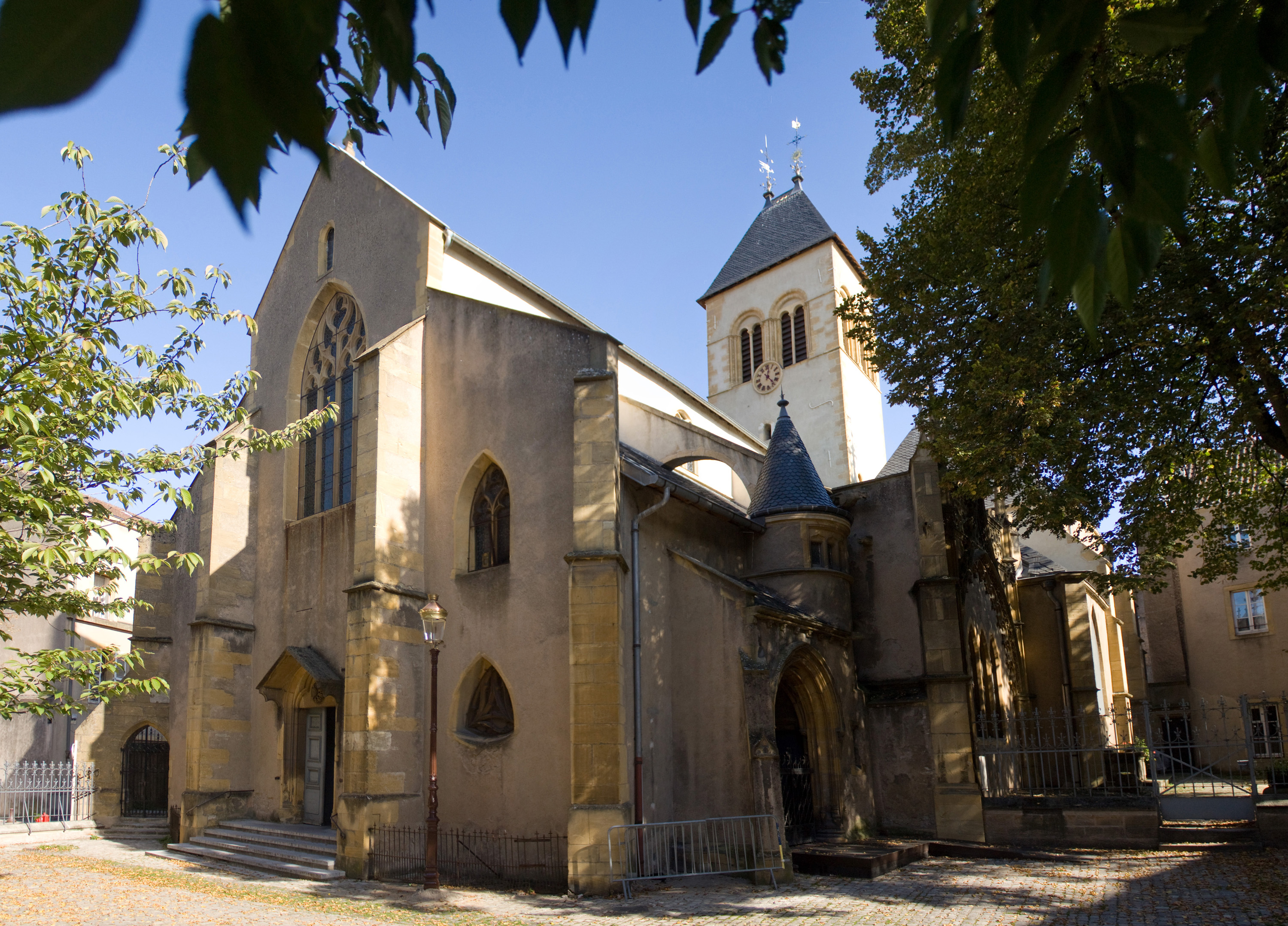
Eglise St-Euchère, Metz

== See also ==
- Saint Eucherius of Orléans, patron saint archive
