= Johann Anton Friedrich Baudri =

German Roman Catholic priest (1804–1893)

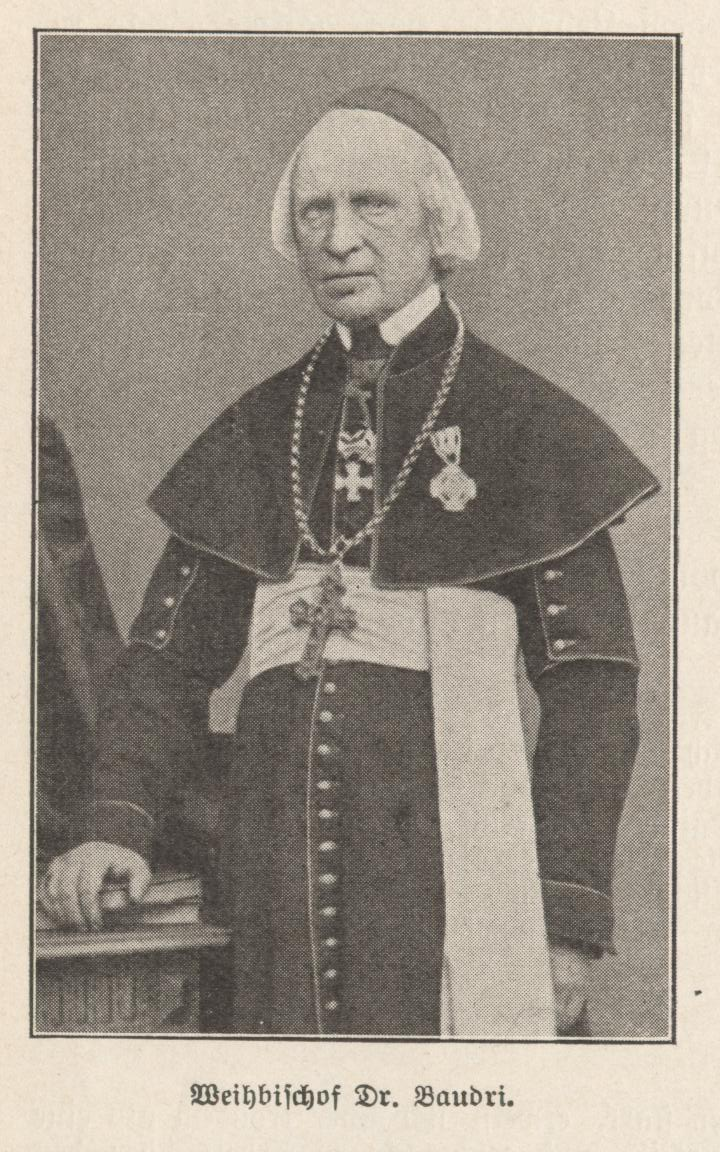
Weihbischof Johann Anton Friedrich Baudri

Johann Anton Friedrich Baudri (b. 20 February 1804 in Elberfeld (today part of Wuppertal), d. 29 Juni 1893 in Cologne) was a German Roman Catholic priest, the Vicar General of the Roman Catholic Archdiocese of Cologne and the auxiliary bishop of Cologne.

On 28 September 1849 Pope Gregory XVI nominated him as a titular bishop of Arethusa and auxiliary bishop of Cologne. Baudri was ordinated on 25 February 1850 in Cologne.

His brother was Friedrich Baudri.

== Bibliography ==
- Eduard Hegel: Das Erzbistum Köln zwischen der Restauration des 19. Jahrhunderts und der Restauration des 20. Jahrhunderts (=Geschichte des Erzbistums Köln, Vol. 5), Köln, 1987, p. 144 and next. ISBN 3-7616-0873-X
- Heinrich Linn, Ultramontanismus in Köln. Domkapitular Baudri an der Seite Erzbischof Geissels während des Vormärz (= Studien zur Kölner Kirchengeschichte, Vol. 22), Siegburg 1987 ISBN 3-87710-133-X
