= Nibelung, Count of Betuwe =

10th-century Dutch noble

Count Nibelung or Nevelung (born c. 890–900, died before 943), son of Count Ricfried and his wife Herensinda, like his father, probably held comital offices in Betuwe (Batavia), and more generally in the Rhine-Meuse-Scheldt delta region in the present day Netherlands, and the neighbouring northern Rhineland, now in Germany. His better-known brother was Bishop Balderic of Utrecht (bishop of Utrecht 918–975).

Nevelung is mentioned on the grave monument of his parents which was in Utrecht. The text was transcribed before the monument was removed. He was described there in Latin as a count ("comes Nevelongus").

Nibelung married a daughter of Reginar II, Count of Hainaut. This was demonstrated independently by both Joseph Daris and Leon Vanderkindere from the text of a grant made by Nevelung's brother, Bishop Balderic, which was addressed to Nevelung's wife after he had died. The grant gave the widow and her two sons the usufruct of lands controlled by the bishopric near Roermond, now in the Netherlands. In return, Nevelung's widow gave lands and rights near Krefeld, now in Germany.

Apart from the two sons, a much older daughter was also proposed by Léon Vanderkindere.

- Bertha (proposed by Vanderkindere), married to Arnulf, Count of Cambrai, son of Isaac, Count of Cambrai. Count Arnulf of Valenciennes was proposed to be their son. She died in 967, at which time her son Arnulf was already an adult.
- Balderic I, Bishop of Liège (served 956–959). Described as young when he became bishop.
- Rodolphe. The 943 letter makes it clear that Rodolphe was younger than Balderic.

As pointed out by Jongbloed (2006), although he was a count when his parents' grave was made, in 943 his own brother describes his father, but not him, as a count, and refers to the "sins of our family", apparently referring to Nevelung and his father-in-law Count Regnier II. The so-called Regnarid family is known to have been in rebellion until in 939 and the Battle of Andernach. Therefore Jongbloed proposes that he died during, or soon after, that rebellion, and that he must have lost his comital title because of events connected to this.

Concerning his approximate age, his brother Balderic was made bishop in 918, and is estimated to have been born 895-900 (Jongbloed 2006). Nevelung's sons must have been born in the 930s or early 940s, because his eldest son Balderic was considered young when he became a bishop in 956.

== Sources ==
- Baerten (1965), "Les origines des comtes de Looz et la formation territoriale du comté", Revue belge de philologie et d'histoire, 43 (2): 468
- Baerten (1965), "Les origines des comtes de Looz et la formation territoriale du comté (suite et fin)", Revue belge de philologie et d'histoire, 43 (4)
- Baerten, Jean (1969), Het Graafschap Loon (11de - 14de eeuw) (PDF)
- Daris, Joseph (1896) ‘Notes sur l’origine des deux Balderic, evêques de Liège’, Notices historiques sur les églises du diocèse de Liège 16 105-112.
- Jongbloed, Hein H., (2006), "Immed “von Kleve” (um 950) – Das erste Klevische Grafenhaus (ca. 885-ca. 1015) als Vorstufe des geldrischen Fürstentums", Annalen des Historischen Vereins für den Niederrhein, Heft 209
- Jongbloed, Hein H (2009), "Listige Immo en Herswind. Een politieke wildebras in het Maasdal (938-960) en zijn in Thorn rustende dochter", Jaarboek. Limburgs Geschied- en Oudheidkundig Genootschap, 145: 9–67
- Jongbloed (2008), "Flamenses in de elfde eeuw", Bijdragen en Mededelingen Gelre
- Vanderkindere, L. (1900) ‘A propos d´une charte de Baldéric d’Utrecht’, Académie royale de Belgique Bulletin de la Classe des Lettres et des Sciences Morales et Politiques (Bruxelles),
- Vanderkindere, Léon (1902), "9" (PDF), La formation territoriale des principautés belges au Moyen Age, vol. 2, p. 128
- Verhelst, Karel (1984), "Een nieuwe visie op de omvang en indeling van de pagus Hasbania (part 1)", Handelingen van de Koninklijke Zuidnederlandsche Maatschappij voor Taal- en Letterkunde en Geschiednis, 38
- Warner, David A., Ottonian Germany. The Chronicon of Thietmar of Merseburg, Manchester, 2001.
