= Hoeselt =

- Municipality
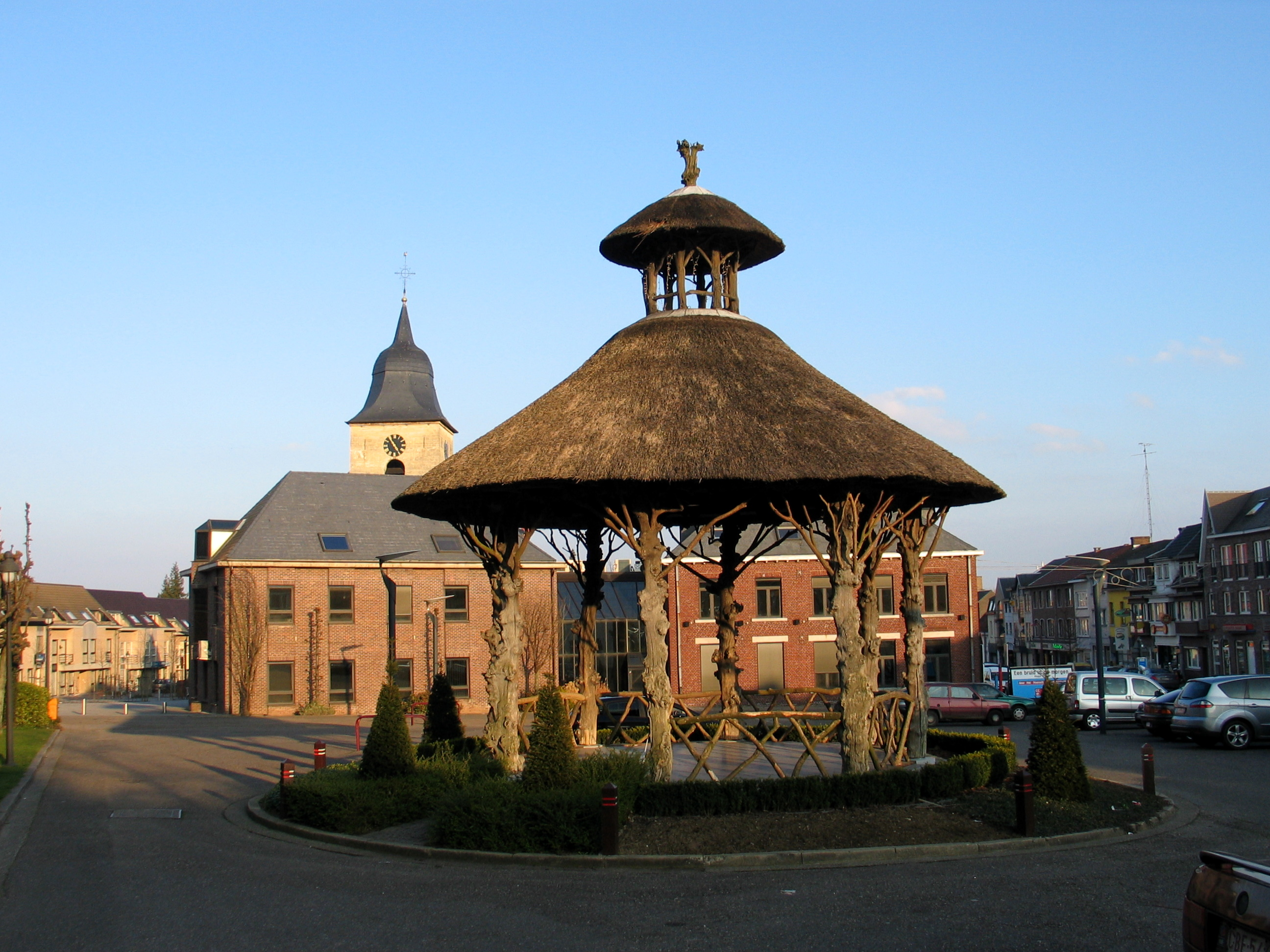

- Flag Coat of arms

- Location of Hoeselt in Limburg
- Interactive map of Hoeselt
- Location in Belgium
- Coordinates: 50°51′N 05°29′E
- Country: Belgium
- Community: Flemish Community
- Region: Flemish Region
- Province: Limburg
- Arrondissement: Tongeren

Government
  - Mayor: Werner Raskin (Open VLD)
  - Governing parties: Open Vld, N-VA

Population (2018-01-01)
  - Total: 9,685
- Postal codes: 3730
- NIS code: 73032
- Area codes: 089
- Website: www.hoeselt.be

Hoeselt (Dutch pronunciation: [ˈɦusəlt]) is a former municipality located in the Belgian province of Limburg. On January 1, 2018, Hoeselt had a total population of 9,685. The total area is 30.02 km^{2} which gives a population density of 323 inhabitants per km^{2}. On 1 January 2025, the municipality merged with Bilzen to form the new municipality Bilzen-Hoeselt

Situated close to the "Roman" Tongeren, many traces from the Roman empire were found in the fertile soil of Hoeselt. In 1066, this village came under the surveillance of Hoei; it was in that time still named Housle (from hus and lo, meaning house by the forest). These forests of Hoeselt were cultivated in the 12th and 13th century.

Later, Hoeselt was part of the Frankish Kingdom; and then its territory fell under the Bishop of Liège.

The old centre of Hoeselt, with its triangular shape, and the motheuvel (motte hill), both show the influence of its Frankish past.
