= Gingelom =

- Municipality
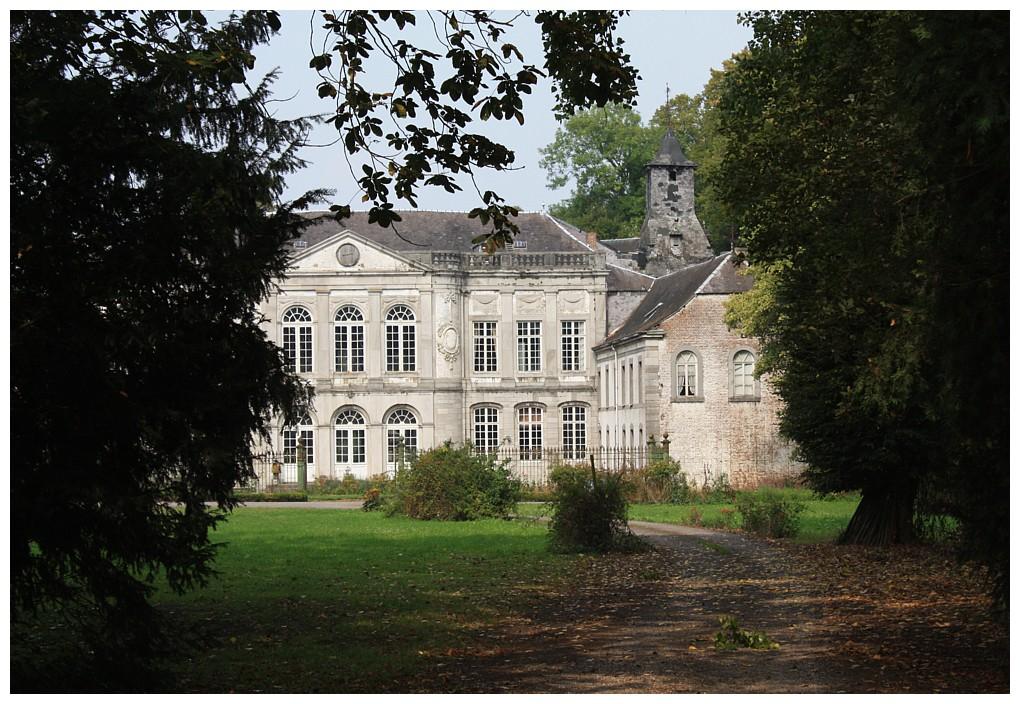
- Kasteel Hasselbroek, Jeuk

- Flag Coat of arms

- Location of Gingelom in Limburg
- Interactive map of Gingelom
- Location in Belgium
- Coordinates: 50°45′N 05°07′E
- Country: Belgium
- Community: Flemish Community
- Region: Flemish Region
- Province: Limburg
- Arrondissement: Hasselt

Government
  - Mayor: Patrick Lismont
  - Governing party: Vooruit

Area
  - Total: 56.34 km^{2} (21.75 sq mi)

Population (2018-01-01)
  - Total: 8,391
  - Density: 148.9/km^{2} (385.7/sq mi)
- Postal codes: 3890, 3891
- NIS code: 71017
- Area codes: 011
- Website: www.gingelom.be

Gingelom (Dutch pronunciation: [ˈɣɪŋəˌlɔm]) is a municipality located in the Belgian province of Limburg. On 1 January 2006 Gingelom had a total population of 7,847. The total area is 56.49 km^{2} (21.81 sq mi) which gives a population density of 139 inhabitants per square kilometre (360 inhabitants/mi^{2}).

The municipality includes the former municipalities of Borlo, Buvingen, Jeuk, Montenaken, Niel-bij-Sint-Truiden, Mielen boven Aalst, Muizen, Boekhout, Vorsen and Kortijs.

== Notable people ==
- Erasme Louis Surlet de Chokier
