= List of state leaders in the 10th-century Holy Roman Empire =

This is a list of state leaders in the 10th century (901–1000) AD, of the Holy Roman Empire.

== Main ==
Holy Roman Empire in Germany

- Holy Roman Empire, Kingdom of Germany (complete list, complete list) –

- Louis the Child, King (899–911)
- Conrad I, King (911–918)
- Henry I, King (919–936)
- Otto I, King (936–973), Holy Roman Emperor (962–973)
- Otto II, King (961–983), Holy Roman Emperor (967–983)
- Otto III, King (983–1002), Holy Roman Emperor (996–1002)

== Austrian ==
- Margraviate of Austria (complete list) –

- Leopold I the Illustrious, Margrave (976–994)
- Henry I the Strong, Margrave (994–1018)

- County of Bregenz (complete list) –

- Ulrich VI, Count (?–950/957)

- Duchy of Carinthia (complete list) –

- Henry I, Duke (976–978, 985–989)
- Otto I, Duke (978–985, 1002–1004)
- Henry II, Duke (989–995)
- Henry III, Duke (995–1002)

- Landgraviate of Sundgau –

- Liutfrid, Count (876–902)
- Liutfrid, Count (c.986)

- March of Styria (complete list) –

- Markward, Margrave (?–c.1000)
- Adalbero of Eppenstein, Margrave (c.1000–1035)

== Bavarian ==
- Duchy of Bavaria (complete list) –

- Luitpold, Margrave (895–907)
- Arnulf, Duke (907–920, 920–937)
- Eberhard, Duke (937–938)
- Berthold, Duke (938–947)
- Henry I, Duke (947–955)
- Henry II the Quarrelsome, Duke (955–976, 985–995)
- Otto I, Duke (976–982)
- Henry III the Younger, Duke (983–985)
- Henry IV, Duke (995–1004, 1009–1017)

- Margraviate of the Nordgau (complete list) –

- Luitpold, Margrave (895–903)
- Poppo of Thuringia, Margrave (903–?)
- Arnulf, Margrave (907–937)
- Berthold of Schweinfurt, Margrave (?–976)
- Henry of Schweinfurt, Margrave (994–1004)

- March of Pannonia (complete list) –

- Luitpold, Margrave (893–907)
- Aribo of Austria (871–909)

- Prince-Bishopric of Passau (complete list) –

- Christian, Prince-Bishop (991–1013)

== Bohemia ==
- Great Moravia (complete list) –

- Mojmir II, Duke (894–906)

- Duchy of Bohemia (complete list) –

- Spytihněv I, Duke (c.894–915)
- Vratislaus I, Duke (915–921)
- Wenceslaus I, Duke (921–935)
- Boleslaus I the Cruel, Duke (935–972)
- Boleslaus II the Pious, Duke (972–999)
- Boleslaus III the Redhead, Duke (999–1002, 1003)

== Burgundian-Low Countries ==
- County of Frisia / County of Holland (complete list) –

- Dirk I, Count (896–931)
- Dirk I bis, Count (931–939)
- Dirk II, Count (939–988)
- Arnulf, Count (988–993)
- Dirk III, Count (993–1039)

- County of Hainaut (complete list) –

- Sigard, Count (898–908)
- Reginar I, Count (870–898, 908–915)
- Reginar II, Count (915–post-932)
- Reginar III, Count (pre-940–958)
- Godfrey I, Count (958–964)
- Hainaut split into Mons and Valenciennes

- County of Mons (complete list) –

- Richar, Count (964–973)
- Renaud, Count (973)
- Reginar IV, Count (973–974, 998–1013)
- Godfrey II, Count (974–998)

- County of Namur (complete list) –

- Robert I, Count (946–c.981)
- Albert I, Count (c.981–1011)

- County of Valenciennes (complete list) –

- Amaury, Count (953–973)
- Werner, Count (973)
- Reginar IV, Count (973–974)
- Arnulf, Count (974–988)
- Baldwin IV, Count (988–1035)

== Franconian ==
- Duchy of Franconia (complete list) –

- Conrad the Elder, ruler (?–906)
- Conrad I the Younger, Duke (906–918)
- Eberhard, Duke (918–939)

== Lorraine ==
- Lotharingia (complete list) –

- Louis the Child, King (900–911)
- Charles the Simple, King (911–923)

- Duchy of Lorraine (complete list) –

- Gebhard, Duke (903–910)
- Reginar, Duke (910–915)
- Gilbert, Duke (915–939)
- Henry, Duke (939–940)
- Otto, Duke (942–944)
- Conrad, Duke (944–953)
- Bruno the Great, Duke (954–965)

- Duchy of Lower Lorraine (complete list) –

- Godfrey I, Vice Duke (959–964)
- Richar, Vice Duke (968–972)
- Charles, Duke (976–991)
- Otto, Duke (991–1012)

- Duchy of Upper Lorraine (complete list) –

- Frederick I, Duke (959–978)
- Theodoric I, Duke (978–c.1027)

== Rhenish ==
- County of Bar (complete list) –

- Frederick I, Count (959–978)
- Theodoric I, Count (978–1026/1027)

- Archbishopric of Cologne (complete list) –

- Bruno I, Prince-Archbishop (953–965)
- Volkmar, Prince-Archbishop (965–969)
- Gero, Prince-Archbishop (969–976)
- Warin, Prince-Archbishop (976–984)
- Ebergar, Prince-Archbishop (984–999)
- Heribert, Prince-Archbishop (999–1021)

- Essen Abbey (complete list) –

- Hadwig I, Princess-Abbess (910–951)
- Agana, Princess-Abbess (951–965)
- Ida, Princess-Abbess (966–971)
- Mathilde II, Princess-Abbess (971–1011)

- Prince-Bishopric of Liège (complete list) –

- Notger, Prince-Bishop (972–1008)

- Prince-Bishopric of Mainz (complete list) –

- Hatto I, Prince-archbishop (891–913)
- Herigar, Prince-archbishop (913–927)
- Hildebert, Prince-archbishop (927–937)
- Frederick, Prince-archbishop (937–954)
- William, Prince-archbishop (954–968)
- Hatto II, Prince-archbishop (968–970)
- Rudbrecht, Prince-archbishop (970–975)
- Willigis, Prince-archbishop (975–1011)

- County Palatine of Lotharingia (complete list) –

- Wigeric of Lotharingia, Count (c.915/16–922)
- Godfrey, Count (c.940)
- Hermann I of Lotharingia, Count (945–994)
- Ezzo, Count (996–1034)

- Prince-Bishopric of Sion (complete list) –

- Hugues, Prince-Bishop (993/4–1018/20)

- Prince-Bishopric of Speyer (complete list) –

- Einhard, Prince-bishop (895/898–913)
- Bernhard, Prince-bishop (914–922)
- Amalrich, Prince-bishop (913/923–943)
- Reginwalt I, also Reginhard, Prince-bishop (943/944–950)
- Gottfried I, Prince-bishop (950–960)
- Otgar, Prince-bishop (960–970)
- Balderich, Prince-bishop (970–987)
- Ruprecht, Prince-bishop (987–1004)

- Prince-Bishopric of Strasbourg (complete list) –

- Erkanbald, Prince-Bishop (982–991)
- Wilderold, Prince-Bishop (991–999)
- Alawich II, Prince-Bishop (999–1001)

- Elector-Bishopric of Trier (complete list) –

- Radbod, Prince-bishop (898–915)
- Rudgar, Prince-bishop (915–930)
- Rotbert, Prince-bishop (930–956)
- Henry I, Prince-bishop (956–964)
- Dietrich I, Prince-bishop (965–977)
- Egbert, Prince-bishop (977–993)
- Ludolf, Prince-bishop (994–1008)

- Prince-Bishopric of Worms (complete list) –

- Dietlach, Prince-bishop (890–914)
- Richowo, Prince-bishop (914–950)
- Hanno, Prince-bishop (950–978)
- Hildebold, Prince-bishop (978–998)
- Franco from Hesse, Prince-bishop (998–999)
- Erfo, Prince-bishop (999)
- Razo, Prince-bishop (999)
- Burchard I, Prince-bishop (1000–1025)

== Lower Saxon ==
- Duchy of Saxony (complete list) –

- Otto I the Illustrious, Duke (880–912)
- Henry the Fowler, Duke (912–936)
- Otto II the Great, Duke (936–961)
- Hermann Billung, Ducal representative (961–973)
- Bernard I, Duke (973–1011)

- Billung March (complete list) –

- Hermann Billung, Margrave (936–973)

- Gandersheim Abbey (complete list) –

- Liudgard I, Princess-Abbess (919–923)
- Hrotsuit, Princess-Abbess (923–933)
- Wendelgard, Princess-Abbess (933–949)
- Gerberga II, Princess-Abbess (949–1001)

- Obotrites (complete list) –

- Nako, leader (954–966)
- Mstivoj and Mstidrag, Prince (966–995)
- Mieceslas III, Prince (919–999)
- Mstislav, Prince (996–1018)

== Upper Saxon ==
- Eastern March (complete list) –

- Odo I, Margrave (965–993)
- Gero II, Margrave (993–1015)

- Hevelli –

- Baçlabič, Prince (921–936)

- March of Merseburg (complete list) –

- Siegfried, Count/Margrave (?–937)
- Günther, Margrave (965–976, 979–982)

- Margraviate of Meissen (complete list) –

- Wigbert, Margrave (965–970)
- Thietmar, Margrave (976–979)
- Rikdag, Margrave (979–985)
- Eckard I, Margrave (985–1002)

- Northern March (complete list) –

- Dietrich, Margrave (965–983)
- Lothair I, Margrave (983–1003)

- Duchy of Thuringia (complete list) –

- Conrad, Duke (892–906)
- Burchard, Duke (907–908)
- Eckard I, Duke (1000–1002)

- March of Zeitz –

- Wigger I, Margrave (965–981)

== Swabia ==
- Duchy of Swabia (complete list) –

- Burchard I, Duke (909–911)
- Erchanger, Duke (915–916)
- Burchard II, Duke (917–926)
- Herman I, Duke (926–949)
- Liudolf, Duke (950–954)
- Burchard III, Duke (954–973)
- Otto I, Duke (973–982)
- Conrad I, Duke (982–997)
- Herman II, Duke (997–1003)

- Duchy of Alsace (see also) –

- Udo, Duke (fl.c.999)

- Prince-Bishopric of Augsburg (complete list) –

- Adalbero, Prince-bishop (887–909)
- Hiltin, Prince-bishop (909–923)
- Ulrich I, Prince-bishop (923–973)
- Henry I, Prince-bishop (973–982)
- Adalrich, Prince-bishop (982–988)
- Luitold, Prince-bishop (989–996)
- Gebehard, Prince-bishop (996–1000)

== Italy ==
Holy Roman Empire in Italy

- Kingdom of Italy (complete list) –

Integrum: Simultaneous claimants
- Berengar I, King (887–924)
- Louis III the Blind, King (900–905)
- Rudolph II of Burgundy, King (922–926)
- Hugh of Arles, King (924–947)
- Lothair II, King (948–950)
- Berengar II of Ivrea, co-King (950–961)
- Adalbert of Ivrea, co-King (950–963)
Ottonian dynasty
- Otto I, King (961–973)
- Otto II, King (980–983)
- Otto III, King (996–1002)

- Upper Burgundy (complete list) –

- Rudolph I, King (888–912)
- Rudolph II, King (912–937)
- Conrad I, King (937–993)
- Rudolph III, King (993–1032)

- Papal States (complete list) –

- Benedict IV, Pope (900–903)
- Leo V, Pope (903)
- Sergius III, Pope (904–911)
- Anastasius III, Pope (911–913)
- Lando, Pope (913–914)
- John X, Pope (914–928)
- Leo VI, Pope (928)
- Stephen VII, Pope (929–931)
- John XI, Pope (931–935)
- Leo VII, Pope (936–939)
- Stephen VIII, Pope (939–942)
- Marinus II, Pope (942–946)
- Agapetus II, Pope (946–955)
- John XII, Pope (955–963, 964)
- Benedict V, Pope (964)
- Leo VIII, Pope (964–965)
- John XIII, Pope (965–972)
- Benedict VI, Pope (973–974)
- Benedict VII, Pope (974–983)
- John XIV, Pope (983–984)
- John XV, Pope (985–996)
- Gregory V, Pope (996–999)
- Sylvester II, Pope (999–1003)

- Duchy of Spoleto (complete list) –

- Transamund III, Duke (982–989)

- Republic of Venice (complete list) –

- Pietro Tribuno, Doge (888–912)
- Orso II Participazio, Doge (912–932)
- Pietro II Candiano, Doge (932–939)
- Pietro Participazio, Doge (939–942)
- Pietro III Candiano, Doge (942–959)
- Pietro IV Candiano, Doge (959–976)
- Pietro I Orseolo, Doge (976–978)
- Vitale Candiano, Doge (978–979)
- Tribuno Memmo, Doge (979–991)
- Pietro II Orseolo, Doge (991–1009)

- March of Tuscany (complete list) –

- Adalbert II, Margrave (886–915)
- Guy, Margrave (915–929)
- Lambert, Margrave (929–931)
- Boso, Margrave (931–936)
- Humbert, Margrave (936–961)
- Hugh, Margrave (961–1001)
