= Pagus of Liugas =

Pre-12th century territory where modern Germany, Belgium, Netherlands meet

Liugas, Leuwa-gau, or Luihgau, was a small pagus or gau from the late 8th to mid-11th centuries, east of the Meuse (or Maas) river roughly between Liège, Maastricht, and Aachen, an area where Germany, Belgium and the Netherlands meet today. There were only a small number of mentions made of this territory, all between 779 and 1059.

Much of Liugas was located in the modern Belgian province of Liège in Belgium and South Limburg in the Netherlands. Based on some of the many spelling variants, it was traditionally believed to have been named after the nearby city of Liège. This is now seen as incorrect by modern scholars.

It was administered by one or more counts. There are two counts associated with the area in the 10th century, Sigehard and Richar. After 1000 there are also some records which indicate that a Count Theobald or Thibaut held a county there. After him, the area was divided into new jurisdictions such as those based in Valkenburg, Limbourg-sur-Vesdre, Voeren and Dalhem.

== Name and relationship with Liège ==
The etymologies of both Liège and Liugas/Luihga are uncertain, but they are unlikely to be related. The etymology of Liège is believed to derive from Proto-Germanic *liudiz, originally meaning "people" or "folk", which was a root with many derived meanings, such as "vassals". Concerning the pagus name, scholar Maurice Gysseling reconstructed the name as "Leuwa". Ernst thought its real name was Louva or Luvia, or the Pagus Luvensis.

In Latin medieval records the pagus or county is never referred to simply as the Pagus Leodicensis or Leodiensis, which would be the normal way to name a pagus or gau of Liège. Liège itself was nearby, but not within it. It was described in medieval records as being within a different pagus, called Hasbania (Hesbaye). Since at least the 19th century, scholars including Godefroid Kurth have doubted the traditional explanation of the name Liugas as being derived from the name of the city Liège, though it was the dominant centre of power in the area. In the 20th century historians such as Manfred Van Rey and Ulrich Nonn have continued to question the traditional explanation of Liugas as a "Liège gau".

In contrast, in 1902, the influential Belgian historian Léon Vanderkindere argued that it could not be a mere coincidence that the names were so similar, and referred to the pagus as Luihgau, emphasizing the similarity of "Luih" with the modern Dutch name of Liège, "Luik". As a result of such reasoning, German scholars traditionally tended to use the term "Lüttichgau", Lüttich being the German name of Liège. And in other languages such as English there are also occasional references to a "County of Liège". However, the medieval Dutch name of Liège was Ludic, Lutike, Lutke etc.

While Liège is on the west bank of the Meuse, all the places in Luigas are in the countryside east of it. The treaty of Meerssen in 870, which divided the Frankish kingdoms along the Meuse, is the only record which indicates a left-bank part to the county, but this document also explicitly doesn't include Liège in Liugas. The main part which is on the eastern side is referred to as an appurtenance of Visé, not Liège. As Nonn explains, his was chief town of the jurisdiction of St Remacle, and had a jurisdiction on the west side of the river which was presumably divided from it by the treaty. The treaty also used quite different spellings for the two jurisdictions: Sancti Laurentii Leudensi ("[of] St Lawrence of Liège") and Liugas.

The medieval records consistently spell the pagus name in a wide range of ways, using -ch-, -k-, -g-, -v-, -w- (for example Leukro, Liugas, Luviensi, Liwensi), never with a -d- or -t-. The city, on the other hand, always had a dental consonant -d- (Leodensis etc) until about 980, when Lethgia and Ledgia appear, followed by occasional forms such as Legia, although spelling with -d- continued to dominate.

== Geographical definition and early attestations ==
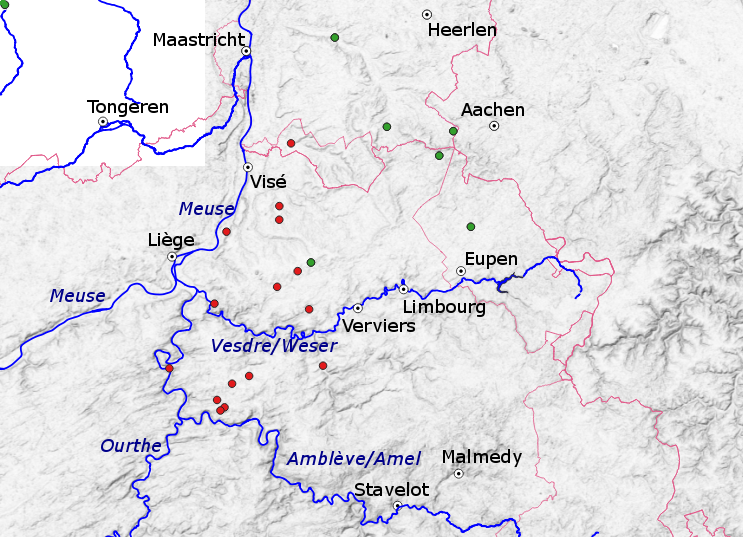
Places attested in the early medieval gau or pagus of Luigas or Luihgau, sometimes called the County of Liège. The red markers are attestations of places in the Luihgau pagus from 779 until 1005. The green markers are from 1041 to 1059 under Count Thibault.

The pagus has been found in records from the 8th to the 11th century. The places named as being in the pagus are on the eastern side of the river Meuse, between Liège and the nearby imperial capital in Aachen, which is in what is now Germany.

Vanderkindere believed the territory must have approximated the late medieval church deanery of St Remacle.

As summarized by Ulrich Nonn, up to the year 900:

- This territory is first mentioned in 779 in a charter of Charlemagne (aliquos mansos in Angelgiagas in pagello Leuhio). The place involved is now understood to be José (fr) in Battice (fr). In this first record, it is notably described as a small pagus (pagellus).
- The second record in 844 concerned the same place (in pago Leukro in Angelgiagas).
- In 862 there is reference to a "New castle" (Novo Castro) in pago Leochensi, which was possibly the castle of Chèvremont, at the junction of the Vesdre and Meuse rivers.
- In the 870 Treaty of Meerssen the Carolingian dynasty divided its kingdoms up, mentioning two part of Liugas, one on each side of the Meuse river.
- In 882 a royal charter mentions Blindef near Louveigné (Blandouium) being in pago Leuuensi.
- In 898 a royal charter mentions Theux (Teiz) near Verviers in pago Leuga.

=== Count Sigehard ===
Sigehard (attested 902–920), is presumed to be the same Lotharingian count mentioned holding lands in the Pagus of Hainaut in this period, in 908 and 920. Once again using Nonn:

- In 902 Wandre was mentioned as being in pago Leuchia and in the county of Count Sigehard (in comitatu Sigarhardi). Esneux is also mentioned.
- In 905 Rouvreux, Foccroule, Noidré and Lillé (Rouoreiz, Felderolas, Nordereit, Leleias) are described as being in pago et comitatu Liuuensi, indicating they were also in a county of the same name as the pagus, but not naming the count.
- In 908 Theux was also described as being in both the pagus and comitas "Liwensi" but this time Count Sigohard is named.
- In 909 Mortier is described being in the county of Luigas (in comitatu Leuchia). Notably, there is no pagus mentioned.
- In 915 Theux is described as being in the pagus, and Sigehard is specified as the count (in pago Leuviensi atque in comitatu Sichardi).

=== Count Richar ===
Once again continuing the listing by Nonn:

- In 966 another count is named, Count Richar. Voeren (Furon), and Cortils in Blegny (Curcella) are described as being in pago Liuhgouui in comitatu Richarii.

Richar (died in 972), also took over the county of Mons, in the pagus of Hainaut, when its count Godefried died.

After he died, two other Lotharingian nobles were killed defending Hainaut from Reginar IV, who was attempting to claim lands his father Reginar III once had. They were Count Werner and his brother, Reynald.

Richar was a close relative, probably a nephew (nepos), of Duke Godefried who he replaced in Hainaut. (He was described as a nepos by Godefried's brother Bishop Wicfried of Cologne, after Richar died in an attack on him.) He is thus likely to be a member of the so-called "Matfried" noble clan (de). According to Eduard Hlawitschka (de) Werner and Reynald were probably brothers of Richar.

After the death of Richar, Werner and Reynald, an equivalent position of count in Hainaut was taken up by another relative named Godefried, Godefried the Captive, whose mother was a sister of the earlier Duke Godefried, and Bishop Wicfried of Cologne.

=== Count Thibaut ===
In the 11th century, the following records are relevant. From 1041 there was a count named Dietbold or Tietpald, generally modernized to Theubald or Thibaut, whose possessions were closer to Aachen than the earlier records:

- In 1005 a royal diploma mentions the villas called Soron et Solmaniam which were in pago Lewa. These are identified, for example by Ernst, as modern Soiron and Soumagne. Unusually, no county name, or name of a count with jurisdiction, was given.
- In 1041 a royal charter mentions Itterve or Herve (Iteren or Herve according to Ernst), Vals (Vaals), Apine (Epen) and Falchenberch (Valkenburg) which were in pago Livgowe et in comitatu Dietbaldi.
- 1042, Giminiacum (Gemmenich), and Harvia (Walhorn according to Ernst) are mentioned as being in the county of Teubaldus.
- 1059, Harvia or Harnia (interpreted as modern Walhorn by Ernst) and Vals (Vaals) in Pago Leuva et in comitatu Tietbaldi.

In 1072 and 1098, Harne, which Ernst interprets as Walhorn, one of the places mentioned above, still named as being in the county of Diepold, is described as being in the Ardennes (pagus Harduenne) instead.

== Speculations ==
Also speculated to have had comital (or similar) status have been:

- Reginar I (870-898), an important noble in the greater region. Leon Vanderkindere proposed that he must logically have ruled here, and been replaced only temporarily by Sigard, when he was out of favour.
- Giselbert (died 939), son of Reginar I, also Duke of Lorraine. He held the castle of Chevremont near Liège, and according to the argument of Vanderkindere, this fort may have been considered part of the gau.
- Count Emmo held land in the counties of other counts in 966, including Richar's county of Liugas, and he was also associated with Chevremont.
- Godizo (through 980-985), a son of a "Richizo" mentioned by Alpert of Metz, who has in turn traditionally proposed to be Richar, though this Richizo was never named as a count in any record. Hlawitschka believes that Richizo is the same person as Richwin, an apparent brother of Richar, and not Richar himself. He also appears in a 973 record in Hainaut, after the death of Richar.

== Legacy ==
In the area of the pagus of Liugas, the counties of Dalhem (fr)(nl) and Limburg developed in the 11th and 12th centuries.

== See also ==
- Pays de Hervé

== Bibliography ==
- Aarts, B., ‘Excurs 1’, in: Verdonk, H., Alzey-Zutphen. Een onderzoek naar het rijksleen te Alzey van de graven van Zutphen, (The Hague 2012), pages 77–91.
- Ernst (1837), Histoire du Limbourg
- Hlawitschka, Eduard (1969), Die Anfänge des Hauses Habsburg-Lothringen. Genealogische Untersuchungen zur Geschichte Lothringens und des Reiches im 9., 10. und 11. Jahrhundert
- Nonn, Ulrich (1983), Pagus und Comitatus
- Vanderkindere, Léon (1902), "Chapter 10" (PDF), La formation territoriale des principautés belges au Moyen Age, vol. 2, pp. 159–183
- Verdonk, H., Alzey-Zutphen. Een onderzoek naar het rijksleen te Alzey van de graven van Zutphen, (The Hague 2012).
- Verhelst, Karel (1984), "Een nieuwe visie op de omvang en indeling van de pagus Hasbania (part 1)", Handelingen van de Koninklijke Zuidnederlandsche Maatschappij voor Taal- en Letterkunde en Geschiednis, 38
- Verhelst, Karel (1985), "Een nieuwe visie op de omvang en indeling van de pagus Hasbania (part 2)", Handelingen van de Koninklijke Zuidnederlandsche Maatschappij voor Taal- en Letterkunde en Geschiednis, 39
