= Count of Hainaut =

Ruler of the county of Hainaut

Coat of arms of the county of Hainaut

The Count of Hainaut (French: Comte de Hainaut; Dutch: Graaf van Henegouwen; German: Graf von Hennegau) was the ruler of the county of Hainaut, a historical region in the Low Countries (including the modern countries of Belgium, the Netherlands, Luxembourg and parts of northern France and western Germany). In English-language historical sources, the title is often given the older spelling Hainault.

== List of counts of Hainaut ==
=== 10th century ===
Throughout the 10th century, it is uncertain whether the region of Hainaut was ever united under one count. Separate counties may for example have existed based at the forts of Mons and Valenciennes.

- (uncertain) Reginar I (d. 915)
- Sigard (fl. 902–920), also Count of Liugas
- (uncertain) Reginar II (r. 920–after 932)
- (uncertain) Reginar III (r. before 940–958)
- Godfrey I (r. before 958–964), also Duke of Lower Lotharingia
- Richar (r. 964–973), also Count of Liugas

Counts of Mons

- (uncertain) Renaud (r. 973)
- Godfrey II "the captive" (r. 974–998)
- (uncertain) Reginar IV (r. 998–1013)
- Reginar V (r. 1013–1039), acquired the southern part of the Brabant province around 1024
- Herman (r. 1039–1051), married Richilde, acquired Valenciennes around 1045 or 1049

Counts and Margraves of Valenciennes

- (uncertain) Amaury (fl. 953–973)
- (uncertain) Werner (r. 973)
- Arnulf of Valenciennes (d. 1011/1012), also probably count of Cambrai
- Baldwin IV (r. 988–1035)
- Baldwin V (r. 1035–1045)
- (uncertain) Reginar of Hasnon (d. c. 1049), father of Richilde, Countess of Hainaut (1045-1048/49)
- Herman (r. 1039–1051), as husband of Richilde (1048/49-1051)

Under Herman and Richilde Hainaut was united in a single consolidated County of Hainaut.

=== House of Flanders ===

- Baldwin I (r. 1051–1070), also Count of Flanders
- Arnulf I (r. 1070–1071), son of Baldwin VI, also Count of Flanders
- Baldwin II (r. 1071–1098), son of Baldwin I
- Baldwin III (r. 1098–1120), son of Baldwin II
- Baldwin IV (r. 1120–1171), son of Baldwin III
- Baldwin V (r. 1171–1195), son of Baldwin IV, also Count of Flanders from 1191
- Baldwin VI (r. 1195–1205), son of Baldwin V, also Count of Flanders and Latin Emperor of Constantinople
- Joan (r. 1205–1244), daughter of Baldwin VI, also Countess of Flanders
- Margaret I (r. 1244–1253), daughter of Baldwin VI, also Countess of Flanders, married first to Bouchard IV of Avesnes and then William of Dampierre

The Counties of Flanders and Hainaut were claimed by Margaret's sons, the half-brothers John I of Avesnes and William III of Dampierre in the War of the Flemish Succession. In 1246, King Louis IX of France awarded Hainaut to John. Margaret refused to hand over the government, but was forced to do so in 1254 by John and the German anti-king William II, Count of Holland.

=== House of Avesnes ===
- John I (r. 1253–1257), son of Margaret I and Bouchard IV of Avesnes

=== House of Flanders ===
- Margaret I (r. 1257–1280), resumed control after John I's death

=== House of Avesnes ===

- John II (r. 1280–1304), son of John I, also Count of Holland
- William I (r. 1304–1337), son of John II, also Count of Holland
- William II (r. 1337–1345), son of William I, also Count of Holland
- Margaret II (r. 1345–1356), daughter of William I,
  - jointly with her husband Louis IV, Holy Roman Emperor (d. 1347) and their son William III

=== House of Bavaria ===

- William III (r. 1345–1389), son of Margaret II and Louis IV
  - jointly with his brothers Louis the Brandenburger, Louis the Roman and Otto the Bavarian (1347–1349),
    Stephen II of Bavaria (1347–1353) and Albert I
- Margaret returned in 1350 in opposition to her son and held Hainaut until 1356.
- Albert I, (Regent since 1358, ruled as count 1389–1404)
- William IV (r. 1404–1417), son of Albert I
- Jacqueline (r. 1417–1433), daughter of William IV

Jacqueline was opposed by her uncle John, Duke of Bavaria-Straubing, son of Count Albert I in a war of succession. John's claims devolved upon Philip III, Duke of Burgundy, a nephew of William IV, whose mother had been the sister of William. In April 1433 he forced Jacqueline to abdicate from Hainaut and Holland in his favour.

=== House of Burgundy ===

- Philip I the Good (r. 1433–1467)
- Charles I the Bold (r. 1467–1477), son of Philip the Good
- Mary the Rich (r. 1477–1482), daughter of Charles the Bold, jointly with her husband Maximilian I, Holy Roman Emperor

=== House of Habsburg ===

- Philip II the Handsome (r. 1482–1506), son of Mary and Maximilian
- Charles II (r. 1506–1555), son of Philip, also Holy Roman Emperor (as Charles V)

Charles II proclaimed the Pragmatic Sanction of 1549 eternally uniting Hainaut with the other lordships of the Low Countries in a personal union. When the Habsburg empire was divided among the heirs of Charles V, the Low Countries, including Hainaut, went to Philip II of Spain, of the Spanish branch of the House of Habsburg.

- Philip III (r. 1555–1598), son of Charles III, also King of Spain
- Isabella Clara Eugenia (r. 1598–1621), daughter of Philip II,
  - jointly with her husband Albert, Archduke of Austria)
- Philip IV (r. 1621–1665), grandson of Philip III, also King of Spain
- Charles III (r. 1665–1700), son of Philip IV, also King of Spain

Between 1706 and 1714 the Low Countries were invaded by the English and the Dutch during the War of the Spanish Succession. The fief was claimed by the House of Habsburg and the House of Bourbon. In 1714, the Treaty of Rastatt settled the succession and the County of Hainaut went to the Austrian branch of the House of Habsburg.

- Charles IV (r. 1714–1740), great grandson of Philip III, als Holy Roman Emperor (elect)
- Maria Theresa (r. 1740–1780), daughter of Charles IV, married Francis I, Holy Roman Emperor
- Joseph I (r. 1780–1790), son of Maria Theresa and Francis I, also Holy Roman Emperor
- Leopold I (r. 1790–1792), son of Maria Theresa and Francis I, also Holy Roman Emperor
- Francis I (r. 1792–1835), son of Leopold I, also Holy Roman Emperor

The title was factually abolished in the aftermath of the French Revolution and the annexation of Flanders by France in 1795. Although, the title remained officially claimed by the descendants of Leopold I until the reign of Charles I of Austria.

== Family tree (1055–1433) ==
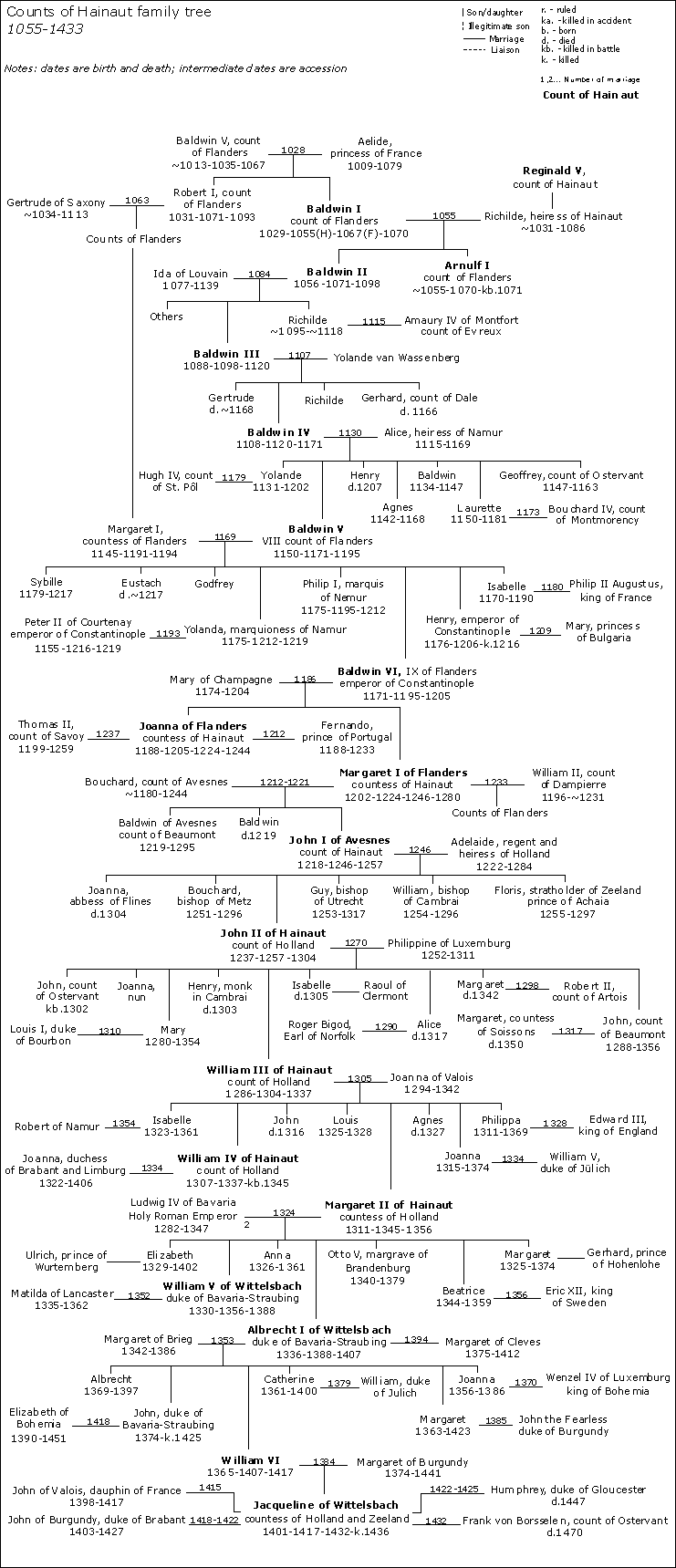

== Modern usage ==
=== House of Belgium ===
In the Kingdom of Belgium, the title of Count of Hainaut was traditionally given to the eldest son of the Belgian crown prince, who was himself styled as Duke of Brabant. In 2001, with the birth of Princess Elisabeth of Belgium (now Duchess of Brabant), heir and elder daughter of Prince Philippe, Duke of Brabant (now Philippe, King of the Belgians), it was decided not to feminise and award her the title of Countess of Hainaut, but to abolish the title.

- Prince Leopold, Duke of Brabant (1859–1865), son of Leopold II of Belgium
- Baudouin I of Belgium (1930–1934), son of Leopold III of Belgium

== See also ==
- County of Hainaut
