= Amaury, Count of Valenciennes =

Lotharingian nobleman (died after 973)

Amaury (Amulric) (died after 973), was a tenth century count with territory in Hainaut, possibly a Count of Valenciennes.

He is known from very few records, and most that has been published about him is speculative.

- One of the only records of this count states that he married an unnamed daughter of Isaac, Count of Cambrai, and that Fulbert, Bishop of Cambrai, dissolved the marriage on the grounds of consanguinity sometime between 953 and 956.
- He also appeared in a record dated 973, concerning a grant in Hainaut. Vanderkindere guessed, based on the places named in the grant, that Amaury must be count of the Valenciennes area.

Vanderkindere speculated in 1902 (Vol. 2 p. 72) that Emperor Otto I created the March of Valenciennes in the late 940s/early 950s and appointed a separate count from that of Hainaut.

It has also been speculated that after the disgrace of Reginar III in 958, Godfrey I, Duke of Lower Lorraine first received the County of Hainaut, which included the cities of Valenciennes and Mons, then when Godfrey died in 964, Amaury was appointed Count of Valenciennes.

It has been speculated that Amaury was succeeded as Count of Valenciennes by Count Werner.

Amaury is the possible father of Guillaume de Montfort of Hainaut.

== Sources ==
Also see:

- Vanderkindere, Leon, Régnier IV, Académie royale de Belgique, Biographie nationale, vol. 19, Bruxelles, 1907
