= Arnulf of Valenciennes =

Lotharingian nobleman

Arnulf (or Arnoul, or Arnold) of Valenciennes (d. 22 October 1011), was a 10th and 11th century count and perhaps sometimes a margrave, who was lord of the fort of Valenciennes, which was at that time on the frontier with France (West Francia), on the river Scheldt. It was part of the pagus of Hainaut, in Lower Lotharingia, within the Holy Roman Empire.

In the 10th century he is often mentioned together with the margrave of the next imperial fort to the north, at Ename, who was also count of Mons, Count Godefrey "the captive".

He was possibly the same person as his contemporary Arnulf the count of Cambrai.

== 10th century ==
As listed out by Ulrich Nonn (p. 130), many of the sources which list Arnulf and Godefrey as counts in Hainaut are clerical narrative sources rather than dated charters. The Gesta of the Bishops of Cambrai for example lists the two counts as coming next in a sequence of counts in Hainaut, after the two brothers Werner and Reynold, who in turn replaced Count Richer. While several such sources describe Count Godefrey very clearly as the Count in Mons, only one, the Translatio s. Sulpicii, describes this Arnulf specifically as a count of Valenciennes.

Only one record seems to describe Arnulf as a margrave rather than count, and this is a military listing made in 982, where Gottefredus et Arnulfus marchiones are listed among many different imperial leaders who were responsible to bring a certain number of armoured knights, for the imperial campaign being planned in Italy.

Arnulf also appears clearly named in charters of Saint Peter's Abbey in Ghent, which also names his wife and son in several cases. This shows that he had possessions on both sides of the Flemish march, in both the Kingdom of France and the Holy Roman Empire. In 998 one such charter shows that he held Mater, very close to the frontier fort of Ename, seat of the march held by Godefrid the captive.

== 11th century ==
A count named Arnulf, and generally equated to Arnulf of Valenciennes, who had rights in Cambrai, had them given by emperor Otto III to the bishop of Cambrai in 1001, and then in 1007, without naming any count, his successor Henry II granted the county of Cambrai to the bishop.

Arnulf out-lived Godefried the Captive who died in 1002, and at some point before he died, a count named Reginar was in control of Mons, either Reginar IV or V. This was recorded in an account of the miracle of St Ghislain.

Late in life, in the years before he died, the Vita Balderici, written in Liège, reports that Arnulf's fort at Valenciennes had come under pressure from the County of Flanders. In 1006 Baldwin IV of Flanders took control of Valenciennes. Falling ill, his kinsman Bishop Balderic travelled to visit him and he counseled him to leave his "castrum", possibly Valenciennes itself, or possibly Visé, to the bishopric.

Balderic returned to Liège and the Vita says he was trying to gather a military force when Arnulf died. This has been determined by modern historians to have been in 1011. Matching dates, different by one day, can be found in necrologies in Liège and Cambrai.

Arnulf's widow Lietgarde, struggling to maintain herself under pressure from Flanders, attempted to travel to Liège, but was taken captive by Count Lambert I of Louvain. The Vita reports that Lambert, who had attacked and defeated Balderic II in the Battle of Hoegaarden in 1013, took the opportunity to force Lietgarde to cede rights in Hanret to him, which he then ceded to Balderic II. These rights in Hanret became part of the possessions of the new Cathedral of St James which Bishop Balderic founded in Liège.

== Family ==
His mother was named as a Countess Bertha, in documents concerning grants she made in favour of Sint-Truiden Abbey just before she died in 967. Not only was her son and heir a Count Arnulf, but Dhondt and Vanderkindere pointed to a shared connection to the Pagus of Caribant, near Lille about 45 km west of Valenciennes and in the kingdom of France. The version of the grant recorded in the chronicle of Sint-Truiden itself, showed that she had rights in the area of Sint-Truiden itself, in Melveren and Brustem.

He and his wife and son appear in a 994 Ghent St Peter charter granting Carvin in Caribant to the Abbey, and he made another grant in 983 for the soul of his late brother Rodger, of Corulis in Caribant.

It has been pointed out by historian Bas Aarts that the witnesses in the grant of Bertha also match partially with another grant by a Bertha with a son Arnulf, to Nivelles Abbey, of 5 manses with meadow and forest on the upper Dyle river. In that charter two younger brothers of Arnulf are named: Herman and Geveard.

His father is not named in medieval records, but it has been proposed on the basis of him being count of Cambrai, and his name, that his father must be the Arnulf who was named as a son of Count Isaac of Cambrai in 941.

It has also been proposed by Vanderkindere that there was a count of Valenciennes before him named Count Amulric who is mentioned in two records from about 953 to 973. In the earliest record from the 950s Amulric was described as a count from Hainaut, and it was mentioned that he had married a daughter of Isaac, Count of Cambrai, but the marriage had been annulled by the bishop due to them being too closely related.

Arnulf was a close relative of Bishop Balderic II of Liège, who was in the family of the Counts of Loon. This relationship was noted in two later Liège documents, the Vita (life story) of Balderic himself, and a falsified charter, supposedly made 1015. Vanderkindere believed this must have been a connection through his mother Bertha's side.

His wife, who survived him, was named Lietgard or Luitgard. It has been proposed that she had a connection to family of the counts of Namur, both because of her son's name, Adalbert, and because after the death of Arnulf she was involved in transactions which led to the acquisition of Hanret, which is in the direction of Namur, by Lambert I, Count of Louvain.

Arnulf and Lietgard had a son named Adalbert (Albert), who predeceased both of them. The obituaries kept by the Saint-Lambert in Liège commemorate the deaths of both Count Arnulf (23 October) and Count Adalbert (30 March) for their grant of Visé to them, showing that Arnulf had an important patrimony very close to Liège itself.

== Biography ==
- Aarts, Bas (1988), "Het "Ansfried-probleem" in Hilvarenbeek en elders", in Scheirs (ed.), Hilvarenbeek Duizend Jaar. Bijdragen tot een symposium over de geschiedenis der Brabantse dorpen
- Aarts, Bas (1994), "Ansfried, graaf en bisschop. Een stand van zaken", in Coolen; Forschelen (eds.), Opera Omnia II. Een verzameling geschied- en heemkundige opstellen
- Dhondt, J (1943), "De crisis van het grafelijk gezag in Vlaanderen na den dood van Arnulf den Eerste", Bijdragen tot de Geschiedenis en de Oudheidkunde: 54–55
- Koch; De Meyer (1951), "De overlijdensdatum van graaf Arnulf van Valenciennes", Revue belge de Philologie et d'Histoire, 29 (1): 139–142, doi:10.3406/rbph.1951.2085
- Lays, Charles (1948), Étude critique sur la Vita Balderici Episcopi Leodiensis, ISBN 9782251661100
- Stiennon, Jacques (1951), Étude sur le chartrier et le domaine de l'Abbaye de Saint-Jacques de Liège, ISBN 9782251661247
- Vanderkindere, Léon (1902), La formation territoriale des principautés belges au Moyen Age (PDF)
- De Waha, Michel (2000), "Filii Ragineri in terra patrum suorum relocati sunt. Pouvoir, opposition et intégration dans le Hainaut du Xème siècle", in Billen, Claire (ed.), Hainaut et Tournaisis, regards sur dix siècles d'histoire. Recueil d'études dédiées à la mémoire de Jacques Nazet (1944–1996), pp. 61–85

== Primary sources ==
- de Borman, Camille (1877), Chronique de l'abbaye de Saint-Trond, vol. 2
- Dillo; Van Synghel, eds. (1979), 2: De heerlijkheden Breda en Bergen op Zoom, part 1: (709-1288), Oorkondenboek van Noord-Brabant tot 1312
- Hemptinne, T. de, A. Verhulst and L. De Mey eds, De oorkonden der graven van Vlaanderen (Juli 1128 - September 1191), Uitgave 2, Band 1 (Brussels 1988)
- Fayen (1906), Cartulaire de Gand. 2, Livre des donations faites à l'abbaye de Saint-Pierre de Gand : depuis ses origines jusqu'au XIe siècle, avec des additions jusqu'en 1273
- Marchandisse, Alain (1991), L'obituaire de la cathédrale Saint-Lambert de Liège (XIe-XVe siècles)
- Pertz, ed. (1841), Vita Balderici Episcopus Leodiensis, MGH SS, vol. 4, pp. 725–726
- Piot, ed. (1870), Cartulaire de l'abbaye de Saint-Trond, vol. 1
- Van Lokeren, Chartes et documents de l'abbaye de Saint Pierre au Mont Blandin à Gand depuis sa fondation jusqu'à sa surpression avec une introduction historique
