= County of Hainaut =

Medieval region in current Belgium and France

Coordinates: 50°27′N 3°57′E

County of Hainaut Comté de Hainaut (French) Graafschap Henegouwen (Dutch)
- ±880–1432 / 1797
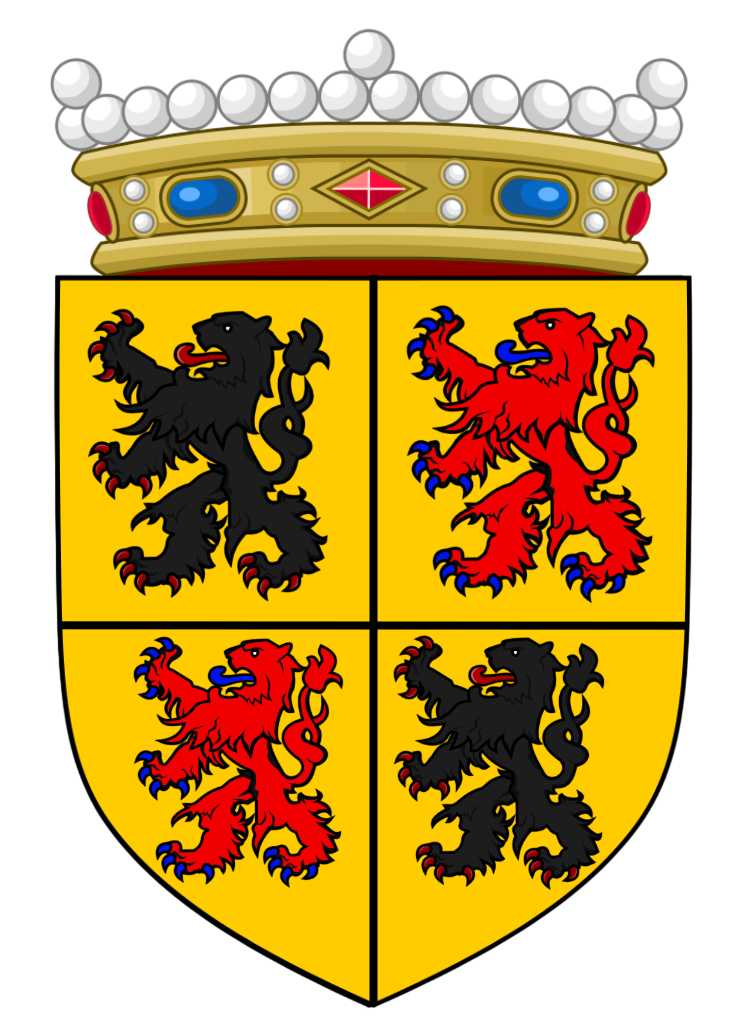
- Flag Coat of arms

- The County of Hainaut within the Holy Roman Empire, 1350
- Status: County
- Capital: Mons
- Common languages: French; Picard; Latin (religious, theological)
- Religion: Roman Catholicism
- Government: Feudal lordship
- Count of Hainaut
  - ?–898: Reginar I (first Reginar count)
  - 1071–98: Baldwin II
  - 1432–67: Philip the Good, Duke of Burgundy
  - 1477–82: Mary of Burgundy
  - 1792–97 (died 1835): Francis II, Holy Roman Emperor (last count)
- Historical era: Middle Ages
  - Consolidation of county: ±880
  - Absorbed into the Burgundian Netherlands: 1432
  - Joined the Burgundian Circle: 1512
  - Annexed by France: 1432 / 1797
Preceded by
| Mons |
| Landgraviate of Brabant |
| Valenciennes |
Succeeded by
| 1433: Burgundian Netherlands |
| 1482: Habsburg Netherlands |
| 1797: Jemmape |
- Today part of: Belgium; France

The County of Hainaut (/eɪˈnoʊ/ ay-NOH; French: Comté de Hainaut; Dutch: Graafschap Henegouwen; Latin: Comitatus Hanoniensis), sometimes spelled Hainault, was a territorial lordship within the medieval Holy Roman Empire that straddled the present-day border of Belgium and France. Its most important towns included Mons (Dutch: Bergen), now in Belgium, and Valenciennes, now in France.

In present-day terms, the original core of Hainaut consisted of the central part of the Belgian province of Hainaut, and the eastern part of the French département of Nord (the arrondissements of Avesnes-sur-Helpe and Valenciennes). It was named after the river Haine, and stretched from there southeast to include the Avesnois region, and southwest to the Selle (Scheldt tributary). In the Middle Ages, its Counts also gained control of part of the original pagus of Brabant to its north and the pagus of Oosterbant to the east, although they did not form part of the old pagus of Hainaut.

Hainaut appears in 8th-century records as a Frankish gau or pagus which included the Roman towns of Famars and Bavay. In the 9th century, and perhaps earlier, it was also described as a county, which implies that it had a single count governing it. As with many counties of the region, there was apparently a 10th-century fragmentation of territories among different counts, which is difficult to reconstruct. In 1071 a single large territorial county was given its more-or-less final form that lasted for the rest of the Middle Ages.

For much of its existence the County of Hainaut was a French-speaking frontier territory of the Holy Roman Empire, bordering upon the Kingdom of France. Previously, from 843 the County formed part of the Frankish "middle kingdom" of Lotharingia. However, after about 925 Lotharingia was definitively attached by King Henry the Fowler to his eastern Frankish realm that would become the Kingdom of Germany. Hainaut and its neighbourhood remained an important frontier area, or "march", during the High Middle Ages. Although a part of the Holy Roman Empire, ruled from present-day Germany, it was culturally and linguistically French and ecclesiastically part of the Catholic Archdiocese of Reims. Like its neighbours such as the counties of Brabant and Flanders, it frequently became entangled in the politics of France.

The counts of Hainaut were often rulers of other counties, including Flanders and Holland. Notable examples of such personal unions include the following:

- Hainaut and Flanders: 1067–71 and again 1191–1246
- Hainaut, Holland and Zeeland: 1299–1356
- Hainaut, Holland and Zeeland as part of Bavaria-Straubing: 1356–1432

In 1432, Hainaut, Holland and Zeeland joined Flanders, Artois, Namur, Brabant, Limbourg, and later Luxembourg, within the large agglomeration of territories in the Low Countries belonging to the French House of Valois-Burgundy. This new state, the Burgundian Netherlands, was inherited by the Habsburg dynasty in the 1470s.

In 1659 and 1678 southern Hainaut was acquired by France. The northern part continued as part of the Habsburg Netherlands. Like much of that state, the northern part of Hainaut was absorbed into the French First Republic in 1797 after the end of the Ancien Régime; it later became part of newly-formed Belgium in 1830.

== Geographical definition ==
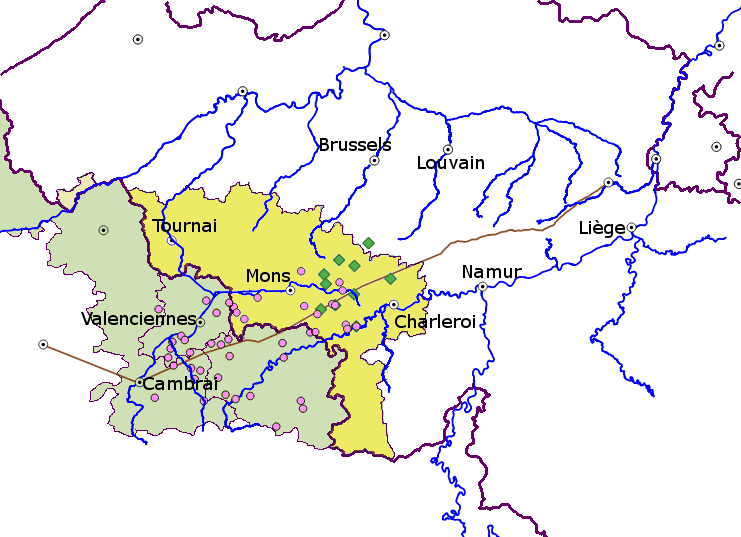
The earliest places described being in Hainaut, in what are now Belgium and France. The brown lines are Roman roads. The green diamonds are places recorded in the early Middle Ages as being in the Silva Carbonaria. The pink circles are places recorded as being in the pagus of Hainaut. The two shaded areas are modern: Nord in France and Hainaut in Belgium.

The river Haine, for which the original pagus (country or territory) is named, flows from east to west. It originates in the once forested area between Binche and modern Charleroi, near the Sambre. It empties into the Scheldt. From the earliest records, Hainaut also extended south of the Haine to the upper Sambre, the Helpe Majeure, Helpe Mineure and the Avesnois region in the Arrondissement of Avesnes-sur-Helpe.

Hainaut's pagus also extended southwest along the Scheldt as far as the Selle river, where the most significant Roman city of the area was Famars (Roman Fanum Martis, literally 'shrine of Mars'), which had been a religious and administrative centre. In the early Middle Ages, records sometimes refer to places within the pagus of Hainaut as being within the pagus Fanomartenis, indicating that either Hainaut had an alternative name, or that Fanum Martis was base to a sub-pagus. According to the 10th-century monk Folcuin, Hainaut was simply a new name for the old Roman name, which had been connected to pre-Christian superstition.

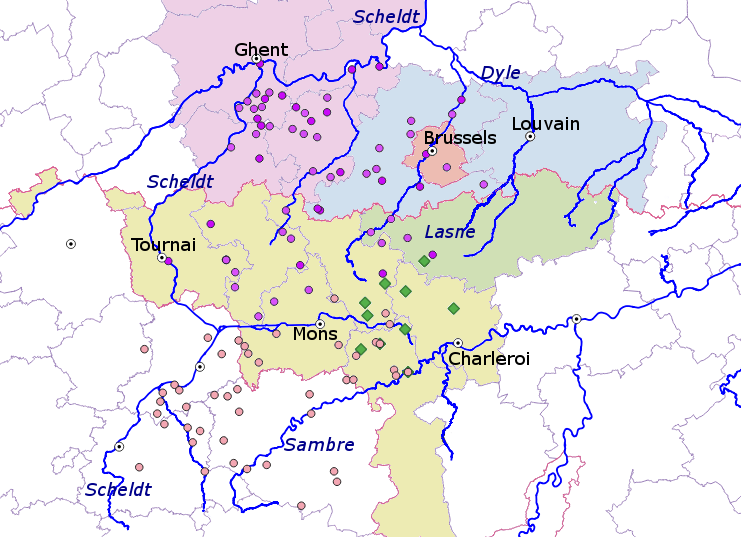
The medieval pagi of Hainaut (pink dots) and Brabant (purple dots) are compared to the modern provinces of Belgium (colours). Modern Belgian Hainaut is yellow, showing that a large proportion of it (since 1071) was originally in old Brabant.

The geographical definition of Hainaut as found in the oldest medieval records, was relatively stable, as shown by Faider-Feytman, Deru, and other historians of the region. According to archaeological evidence, geographical Hainaut, including Avesnes, formed the oldest region of development in the civitas of the Belgic Nervii. They had their early capital in Bavay in Hainaut (Roman Bagacum), which became a major Roman crossroads.

- To the south of the Avesnois, beyond the forest and hills of Thiérache was the pagus and bishopric of Laon, the modern department of Aisne, which was one part of the old civitas of the Roman era Remi.
- To the southwest, the pagus of Cambrai lay beyond the Senne river, and became the capital of the civitas of the Nervii, and later the seat of the medieval bishop who had jurisdiction over Hainaut and Brabant. According to Xavier Deru, this region only developed during the Roman era, with Cambrai itself positioned on the point where a major Roman road crossed the Scheldt. This region corresponds closely to the modern French Arrondissement of Cambrai, and both it and the bishopric are sometimes referred to as the "Cambrésis".
- Directly to the west across the Scheldt from Valenciennes, lay the pagus called the Osterbant (fr, de, nl), which was originally part of the civitas of the Atrebates in Roman times, which has its traditional capital in Arras. The medieval bishopric of Arras contained only two archdeaconries: Arras itself, and Osterbant. While Osterbant was a region that was competed over by the powerful counties of Flanders and Hainaut in the Middle Ages, the rest of the Atrebates' old country became the basis of the medieval county of Artois, which was normally under Flemish control. In modern France, Osterbant is similar in definition to the Arrondissement of Douai.
- To the north, also within the original civitas of the Nervii, lay what would become the oldest form of the pagus of Brabant, stretching between the Scheldt and Dyle and including modern Aalst and Brussels. Medieval and modern Hainaut stretch into the south of the old pagus of Brabant. As shown by Deru, archaeological evidence such as coin finds confirm the cultural connections between Brabant and Hainaut in Roman times.
- To the east of the River Haine lay the Silva Carbonaria ("charcoal forest") which once defined a major boundary. Beyond it, the regions which today contain Charleroi, Namur and Leuven were all within the Roman Civitas Tungrorum and medieval Bishopric of Liège.

== Etymology ==
The etymology of Hainaut is thought to be Germanic. The first part is the river name (the modern Haine, probably based on Germanic) and the second component was originally based upon Germanic *awja, which appears in several old Frankish gau names, such as Masau, the oldest name of the pagus on the Meuse river north of Maastricht. The related concept "gau", used in the modern Dutch and German names of Hainaut, Henegouwen and Hennegau, was also used but never became popular in medieval documents concerning this particular area.

== Earliest records ==
The first surviving records indicating that Hainaut was a county are the records of the Carolingian dynasty being divided into parts in 831, 843 and 870. Most of the early medieval records mentioning Hainaut, starting in the 9th century, describe it as a pagus, a land or country, rather than a county. 8th- and 9th-century attestations, as listed by Ulrich Nonn, however, never name any specific counts who ruled it:

- 750. A document of Pepin the Short refers to a place in pago Hainoavio.
- 779. A document of Charlemagne refers to a place in pago Haginao.
- 831. Louis the Pious announced that the division of the empire would be such that his son Louis the German's domain of Bavaria would include places west of the Meuse including Ainau. The record is not explicit about it being a county or pagus.
- 843. The Treaty of Verdun, as recorded in the Annales Bertiniani mentions hainaum among the regions between the Scheldt and Rhine to become part of the middle kingdom of Lothair I, and implies it is a county.
- 844. A document of Lothair I refers to places in pago Hainoense [...] pago Hainnioense
- 847. A document of Charles the Bald names places in pago Hagnuensi.
- 852. A document of Lothair I names places in pago Haynau.
- 855. A document of Lothair II names places in pago Hainau.
- 870. A document of Charles the Bald names places in pago Hainao.
- 870. The Treaty of Meerssen mentions the comitatus Hainoum, a county, and granted it to the western kingdom.
- 872. A document of Charles the Bald names places in pago Hainau.

Many such early medieval pagi in Europe have histories going back to the Roman Empire. As the Roman empire lost centralized control of this region, which lay in the Roman province of Belgica II, it came under the administration of Childeric I, who had been the military ruler of the Frankish army who previously fought under Romans in Gaul, north of the Loire. The Merovingian dynasty, and later the Carolingians, kept many of the Roman districts, and established counts to administer pagi.

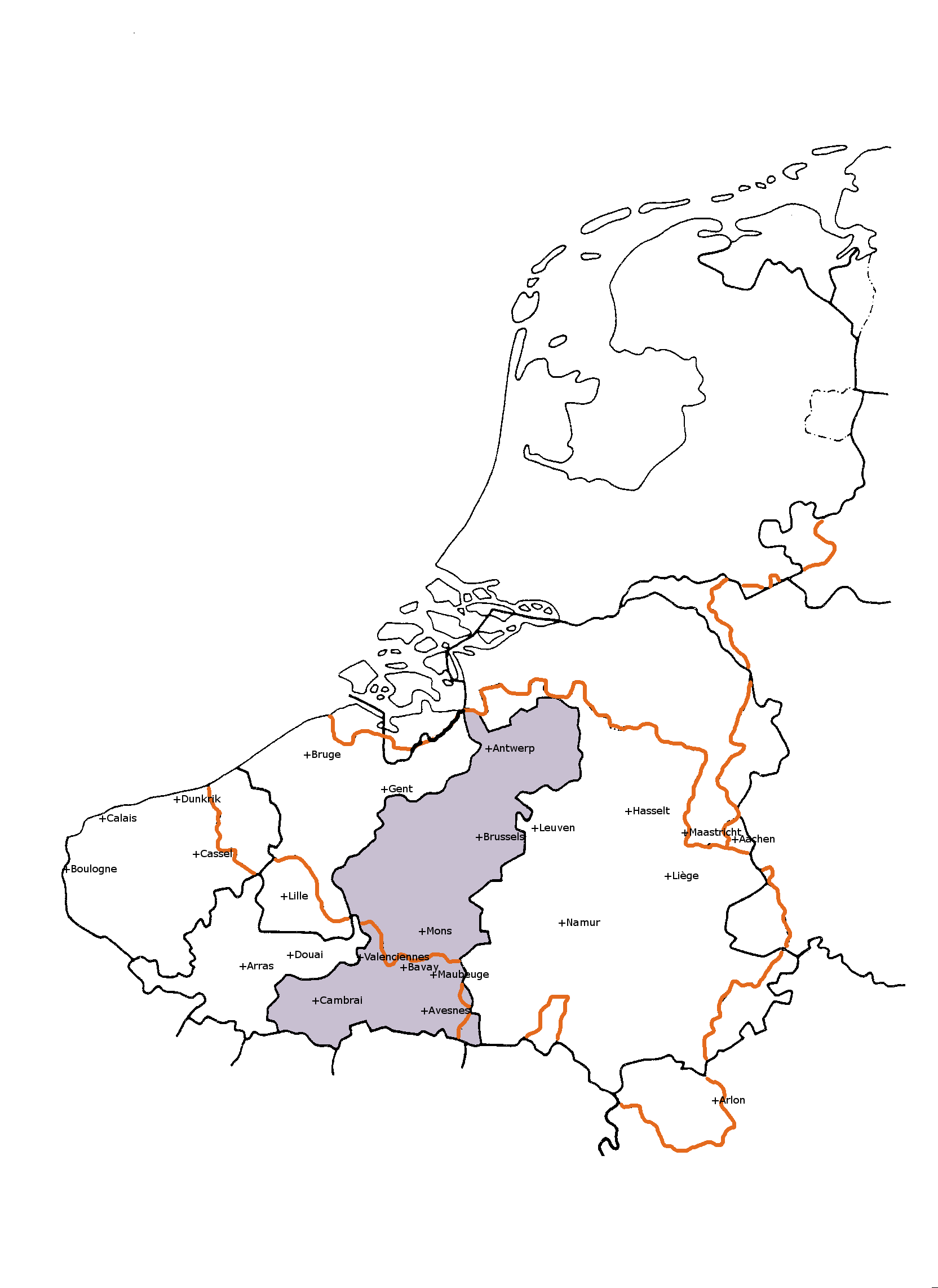
The medieval diocese of Cambrai was based upon the Roman civitas of the Nervii, and contained Hainaut.

== 10th century ==
As explained by Nonn, there are very few, if any, clear records of counts of all Hainaut in the 10th century. The region is associated by many historians such as Leon Vanderkindere with the so-called Reginarid dynasty who were a powerful and rebellious Lotharingian family, known for their frequent use of the name Reginar. This is because later in the 10th century a branch of this family succeeded to take the county by force, after returning from exile. However, while the later family clearly claimed to have once had important rights throughout Lotharingia, the exact nature of most of these is unclear, and their possession of a county in Hainaut before Reginar III can not be proven.

The only medieval record which claims that Reginar I held an office involving all of Hainaut was the much later Dudo of Saint-Quentin, who is considered to be unreliable for this period. He names Reginar as "Duke" (Latin dux) of both Hesbaye and Hainaut, and discusses his march against Rollo in Walcheren, together with a Frisian ruler named Radbod, at some point in late 9th or early 10th century. The late 14th century Annales Hannoniae, which give legendary origins of the Counts of Hainaut, describes this Reginar I as a count of Mons – a title held by his descendants.

The first recorded count who was associated as a count with any part of Hainaut in a contemporary record was Count Sigehard. Leon Vanderkindere proposed that this Sigehard was given the county while Reginar I was out of favour. In fact no such connections can be proven. He was more clearly described as a count in the pagus Liugas, east of Liège.

- 902. The county of Sigarhard included Wandre and Esneux in the pagus of Liugas (in pago Leuchia in comitatu Sigarhardi).
- 908. He was recorded once as a count who was present agreements made about both Lobbes Abbey (Laubacensum abbatiam), which was described as part of the county and pagus of Hainaut (in pago ac in comitatu Hainuensi sitem), and Theux, which was described as being in the pagus and county of Liugas (in pago ac in comitatu Liwensi positum).
- 915. Theux is described as being both in the pagus of Liugas and the county of Sigehard (in pago Leuviensi atque in comitatus Sichardi sitam).
- 916 and 919, Sigehard appears in two documents of West Francia king Charles the Simple dated at Herstal near Liège.
- 920. Sigehard was also recorded as a "venerable" count in a document concerning Crespin Abbey, concerning a grant.. According to Nonn, the record shows that he had held the land involved.

From 925, Lotharingia, including Hainaut, was continuously part of the eastern Frankish kingdom which was the predecessor of the Holy Roman Empire. In 939, the Reginars led a rebellion against the eastern kingdom which was defeated. Gilbert, Duke of Lorraine, the son of Reginar I who had been leader of this rebellion, was killed.

Reginar II (died before 943), the younger son of Reginar I, was named as a Count of Hainaut in the late 11th-century life story (Vita) of Gerard of Brogne (died 959), but this work is considered unreliable, and we can not be certain of this position. His son Count Reginar III Longneck, may also have been a count in Hainaut. What is more certain is that he unsuccessfully rebelled against Duke Bruno the Great, so he was deposed from all offices, exiled and banned in 958. The Vita of Gerard of Brogne also names him as a count of Hainaut. Ulrich Nonn considers it likely that he held Mons because it aligns with other evidence.

A count named Amelric who was "from" the pagus of Hainaut (Latin: ex pago Hainou) is named in or after 953 in the Deeds of the bishops of Cambrai. This is generally taken to mean that Hainaut already included the jurisdictions of more than one count. Apart from the one associated with Mons, Amulric perhaps held a county based in Valenciennes.

The second or third count of Hainaut to be named in a contemporary record was however called Godefrid, starting in 958, the year of Reginar III's exile. He is generally considered to be Godfrey I, Duke of Lower Lorraine who died in 964 in Italy.

After the death of Godfrey in Italy, he was replaced in Hainaut by a Count Richer, who was perhaps the same Count Richer who held a county in the pagus of Liège. In 972 he died. In 973 two noble brothers, Werner and Reynold, were killed near Mons fighting the two sons of Reginar III, Reginar IV and Lambert, who had returned to claim their father's property. Also in 973, Counts named Amelric and Richizo appeared in a royal grant in favour of Crispin Abbey in Hainaut. Amelric is probably the count of 953 mentioned above, with his seat in or near Valenciennes. According to Hlawitchka, Richizo is probably Richwin, a brother of Count Richer who died in 972.

The Regnarid brothers apparently did not succeed in gaining Hainaut, or even Mons for some decades. The Gesta of the bishops of Cambrai records that two counts named Godefrid and Arnulf succeeded Richizo and Amelric, and these two counts were involved in a defense of Cambrai in 979, and appear in other records. They are believed to be the same as Count Godfrey "the captive", and Arnulf of Valenciennes.

In 998 the Reginar IV regained control over the County of Mons, in Hainaut, from Godfrey according to Alberic of Trois-Fontaines. Historian Michel de Waha believes this late report can not be trusted, and that we can only say they took control in the period 985–1015, and probably after 1007. Reginar IV died 1013, and was succeeded by his son Reginar V. Reginar IV's brother Lambert, who made himself Count of Louvain, died in battle in Hainaut in 1015.

The County of Valenciennes disappears from records after the death of Arnulf of Valenciennes in about 1011, with this part of Hainaut possibly being taken over by the County of Flanders.

== High Middle Ages (1000–1250) ==
Coat of arms of the County of Hainaut

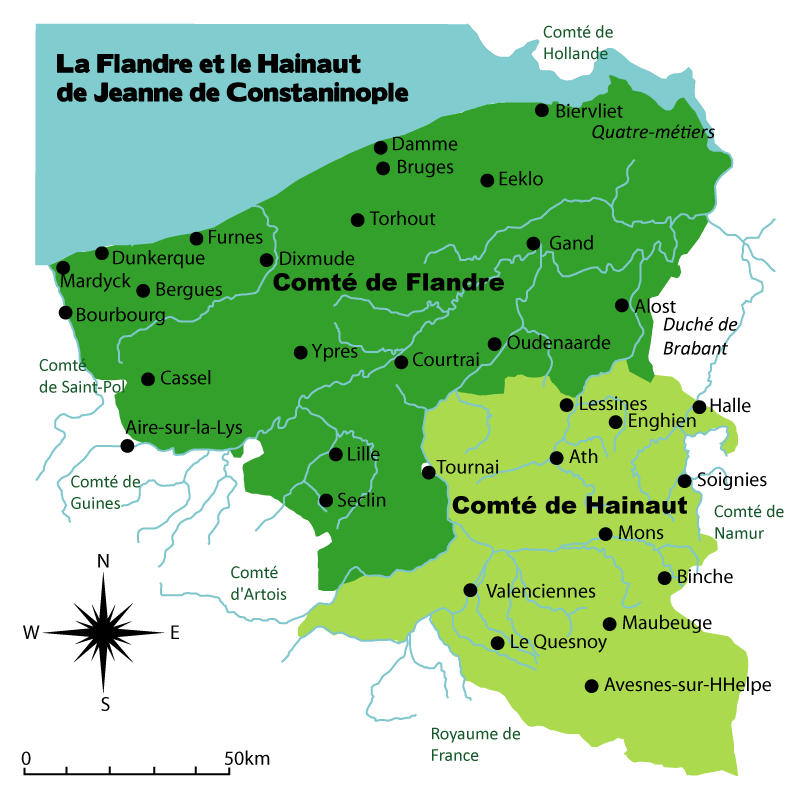
Counties of Flanders and Hainaut after countess Joan (1200–1244)

Reginar V, the son of Reginar IV, married the granddaughter of his father's old rival, Godefrid the "captive". The bishop, Gerard of Florennes, accepted this diplomatic marriage despite the couple being within the degrees of relationship where this would normally not be allowed.

When the last Reginarid Count of Hainaut, Herman, the son of Reginar V, died without issue in 1051, his widow Richilde married Baldwin VI, Count of Flanders, who was a vassal of the French crown. On the death of his father in 1067, Baldwin VI became the ruler of both Hainaut and Flanders. He was succeeded by his son Arnulf III, who was killed at the Battle of Cassel in 1071 in an inheritance dispute with his uncle, Robert I the Frisian. The victorious Robert acquired Flanders, but his sister-in-law Richilde retained the adjacent Lower Lorraine territories in the Holy Roman Empire as her dowry. The revived County of Hainaut, therefore, emerged from the refeudalisation of three immediate counties:

- the County of Mons
- the southern part of the old Pagus of Brabant
- the Ottonian Margraviate of Valenciennes

The unification of the County of Hainaut as an Imperial fief was accomplished after Arnulf's defeat in 1071, when Richilde and her son Baldwin II tried to sell their fiefs to Emperor Henry IV. Henry IV ordered the Prince-Bishop of Liège to purchase the fiefs and then return them as a unified county to the countess Richilde and, through the chain of feudal authority, to the Dukes of Lower Lorraine.

Although Baldwin II did not inherit the County of Flanders, he and his descendants, Baldwin III, Baldwin IV, and Baldwin V, were in the male line of the Counts of Flanders, and the two lines joined again. Baldwin V married the heiress of Flanders, Margaret in 1169, becoming "Baldwin VIII" of Flanders, and during his lifetime Flanders, Hainaut and Namur were united under one lord.

In the next generation, Namur was given to a different son than Flanders and Hainaut, which remained together under Baldwin VI/IX, who became the first emperor of the Latin Empire of Constantinople. Baldwin's brother, Philip I of Namur was regent in Hainaut but also had to fight Luxembourg for control of Namur. Baldwin himself was killed in Bulgaria, leaving two heiresses, Joan who ruled but died childless in 1244, and Margaret who ruled from 1244 and married twice. The lines of her two husbands divided Flanders and Hainaut between them:

- Jean of Avesnes, eldest son of Margaret's first husband, founded a new line of Avesnes counts of Hainaut and died in 1257.
- Guy of Dampierre, eldest surviving son of Margaret's second husband, founded the new line of Flanders counts and died in 1305. He also became count of Namur, though this inheritance was given to a different child.

== Late Middle Ages (1250–1500) ==
From 1299, Hainaut's count Jean II, d'Avesnes, the son of Jean I, was also Count of Holland and Zeeland, through his mother. He was also an unsuccessful claimant to become Count of Flanders. After his grandson William died in 1347, these same lordships went to his sister, and were held by members of the Wittelsbach dynasty who also possessed the Dukedom of Bavaria-Straubing. This branch of the Wittelsbach family held Hainaut until 1436.

The Wittelsbachs struggled against each other in the so-called Hook and Cod wars which were partly driven by factions in Holland. After the death of Duke William II of Bavaria-Straubing in 1417, Hainaut was inherited by his daughter Jacqueline, who had a powerful opponent in her cousin, Philip the Good.

Already in 1428, effective control of Hainaut, Holland and Zeeland was acquired by Philip the Good. In 1432 Jacqueline had to cede the inheritance rights of Hainaut, Holland and Zeeland to Duke Philip. The last independent countess died early on 8 October 1436 (presumably of tuberculosis) in Teylingen Castle, near The Hague, where she is buried. Her estates were incorporated into the Burgundian Netherlands.

Philip was already Duke of Burgundy, Count of Flanders, Artois, Namur and Franche-Comte, and would later become Duke of Brabant, Limbourg, and Luxembourg. His family, the House of Valois-Burgundy, a branch of the French royal family, created a powerful state between France and Germany and Hainaut was part of it. Charles the Bold of Burgundy, the son of Philip, was however killed at the Battle of Nancy in 1477, and the male line of the Burgundian dukes became extinct. In the same year, Charles' daughter Mary of Burgundy married Archduke Maximilian I of Habsburg, the son of Emperor Frederick III, and Hainaut passed to the Habsburg dynasty, who were emperors of the Holy Roman Empire and kings of Spain.

King Louis XI of France had hoped to take advantage of the death of his cousin, Charles and sent an army to invade the Netherlands. However, the French were defeated at the Battle of Guinegate in 1479, and Hainaut was consolidated in the Habsburg Netherlands by the Treaty of Arras in 1482.

== Early modern period (1500–1800) ==
Hainaut became part of the Burgundian Circle in the Holy Roman empire in 1512. It was ruled by the Spanish branch of the Habsburgs from 1555 to 1714.

In 1579 Hainaut was a member of the Union of Arras which submitted to the rule of Habsburg Spain, while the northern Union of Utrecht rebelled and formed the Dutch Republic in 1581.

The 1659 Treaty of the Pyrenees and the 1679 Treaties of Nijmegen cut Hainaut in two. The southern area, around the towns of Valenciennes, Le Quesnoy and Avesnes, was ceded to France under King Louis XIV. During the French revolution it formed the basis of the newly named French département of Nord. Today the area is still referred to as French Hainaut.

The northern part of Hainaut, around Mons, remained part of the Spanish Netherlands, which became the Austrian Netherlands after the 1713 Treaty of Utrecht – moving possession from one branch of the Habsburgs to another.

In 1797, during the French Revolution, the northern part of the county was ceded to France by Emperor Francis II, who was also count of Hainaut. It became the French département of Jemappe. After the defeat of Napoleon at the Battle of Waterloo in 1815, the northern part, once again called Hainaut, went to the new Kingdom of the Netherlands, and then in 1830 to the Kingdom of Belgium which was created from the southern part of that kingdom. It forms the basis of the modern Province of Hainaut in Belgium.

Main subdivisions of Walloon dialects

In modern Hainaut the traditional county's heritage can still for example be seen in the dialect differences. The western part of Hainaut is a transitional area between Picard and Walloon dialects.

== See also ==
- Count of Hainaut
- Counts of Hainaut family tree

== Bibliography ==
- Deru, Xavier (2009), "Cadres géographiques du territoire des Nerviens", Revue du Nord, 5 (383): 179–201, doi:10.3917/rdn.383.0179, ISSN 0035-2624
- Faider-Feytmans, Germaine (1952), "Les limites de la cité des Nerviens", L'Antiquité classique, 21 (2): 338–358, doi:10.3406/antiq.1952.3453
- Hlawitschka, Eduard (1969), Die Anfänge des Hauses Habsburg-Lothringen. Genealogische Untersuchungen zur Geschichte Lothringens und des Reiches im 9., 10. und 11. Jahrhundert
- Nonn, Ulrich (1983), Pagus und Comitatus
- De Waha, Michel (2000), "Filii Ragineri in terra patrum suorum relocati sunt. Pouvoir, opposition et intégration dans le Hainaut du Xème siècle", in Billen, Claire (ed.), Hainaut et Tournaisis, regards sur dix siècles d'histoire. Recueil d'études dédiées à la mémoire de Jacques Nazet (1944–1996), pp. 61–85
