= Werner, Count in Hesbaye =

Lower Lotharingian count

Werner, Count in Hesbaye (French Garnier, Latin Werinharius, short form Werinzo) (died 973) was a Lower Lotharingian count in what is now Belgium and neighbouring parts of Germany. During this period the once independent Kingdom of Lotharingia, was coming under the control of the Kingdom of East Francia, which would become the Holy Roman Empire in 962. The area was still contested by the Kingdom of West Francia.

Werner died with his brother Count Renaud, near Mons in Hainaut, now in Belgium. The two brothers were reported to have been holding the lands that had been held by one Richer, count in Luihgau and Hainaut, who had recently died, and was possibly a close relative. Werner and his brother were killed by brothers Reginar IV, the future count of Mons in Hainaut, and Lambert I, the future count of Louvain. They claimed Mons by right of their dead rebel father, Reginar III, Count of Hainaut.

== Attestations ==
There are a small number of records proposed for Werner. It is not certain that they are all the same person:

- It is proposed that in 953 (?), Werner, while not named as a count, played the role of advocatus for Sint-Truiden Abbey in the Hesbaye region. Such roles were normally performed by counts, or people of similar noble status.
- In 963, or possibly 959, it is proposed that Werner is the count of that name who swapped his lands in Bodeux, close to Stavelot Abbey, now in Belgium, for lands which the abbey held in Nohas, in the Eifelgau, and in the county of Zülpich, now in Germany. It is noted by historians that the witnesses to this transaction may have been close relatives, including a Richar, a Reginardus who might be his brother, and a Duke Godefrid.
- In 966, Werner appeared as count of a county which contained Gelmen, near Sint Truiden. A certain Rudolf (not named as a count) had previously held this estate, but because of his infidelity, in 966 it came to be held by the collegiate church of Maria (de) in Aachen. Gelmen was now to be exchanged by them for a large number of lands held in different parts of Lower Lotharingia by a count named Emmo.
- In 973, various medieval sources report that Werner and his brother Renaud were killed near Mons in Hainaut, defending the area from Reginar IV and his brother Lambert, who claimed it as their dead rebel father's possession, with French support.

This battle near Mons happened after Richer, who had been holding Mons was killed, in October 972, during an attack on his uncle, Bishop Wicfried of Verdun. Reginar and Lambert attacked from France, the next year. However, they failed to take control at this time, and instead Godfrey I, Count of Verdun is attested as count in Hainaut after this.

== Family ==
Werner's exact parentage is unknown, but historian Eduard Hlawitschka has proposed that he was a member of the Matfriede family, and therefore closely related to his predecessors in Hainaut: Richer (count from 964 until his death in 972) and Richer's uncle and predecessor Godfrey I, Duke of Lower Lorraine, who died in 964. It is possible Werner and Renaud were brothers of Richer, and cousins of Godfrey I of Verdun through his mother, who was a member of this Matfriede family.

== Interpretations ==
Belgian historians, including Léon Vanderkindere and Jean Baerten, have traditionally connected the records involving Werner with other records to propose a narrative whereby Werner and his brother were loyalists to the king and longer term enemies of the Reginar family, a powerful Lotharingian family which had an alliance with France in this period.

- In 944, Flodoard in his Annals reported two important Lotharingian brothers, Ragnarius and Rodulfus, who were allied to the King of France, the losing side, during a rebellion in that time. In his 1900 article, Vanderkindere had discovered that Reginar II had died before 943. He proposed that Reginar III had a brother named Count Rudolf, and that this was the same Rudolf who appeared in records as a count in areas near Gelmen in the 940s.
- In 957 Reginar III, the senior Reginarid of that time, was defeated by Bruno, Duke of Lotharingia, and banished to Bohemia where he died. This narrative therefore proposes that Count Rudolf his brother was also removed from positions of importance and Werner had been assigned successor as a Count in the Hesbaye region.
- In the County of Hainaut, where Reginar III's sons claimed to have an inheritance, after the disgrace of Count Reginar III, Godfrey I, Duke of Lower Lorraine received the County of Hainaut. This Duke Godfrey died on campaign in Italy in 964 and had no children. His nephew Richer, Count of Liugas, then appears in records as a count in Hainaut.
- After the 966 charter, in 967, Werner was not mentioned at all in a charter which involved Brustem, very close to Gelmen. Jean Baerten explained this by arguing that Werner was no longer count of the same area, because of another (unattested) royal decision to place him elsewhere, and because a more legitimate heir to the Reginars was to be installed.

== Legacy ==
Hlawitschka has proposed that Werner had a daughter, Godila, who married Liuthar, Margrave of the Nordmark.

== Sources ==
- Baerten, Jean (1965), "Les origines des comtes de Looz et la formation territoriale du comté (suite et fin)", Revue Belge de Philologie et d'Histoire, 43 (4)
- Baerten, Jean (1969), Het Graafschap Loon (11de - 14de eeuw) (PDF)
- Hlawitschka, Eduard (1969), Die Anfänge des Hauses Habsburg-Lothringen. Genealogische Untersuchungen zur Geschichte Lothringens und des Reiches im 9., 10. und 11. Jahrhundert
- Vanderkindere, Léon (1900), "A propos d'une charte de Baldéric d'Utrecht", Académie royale de Belgique Bulletin de la Classe des Lettres et des Sciences Morales et Politiques: 37–53
- Vanderkindere, Léon (1902), "Chapter 10", La formation territoriale des principautés belges au Moyen Age (PDF), vol. 2, pp. 159–183
- Vanderkindere, Léon (1907), "Régnier IV", Académie royale de Belgique, Biographie nationale (PDF), vol. 19, Bruxelles, pp. 879–881
- Verdonk, Henk (2012), Aarts, Bas (ed.), Alzey-Zutphen. Een onderzoek naar het rijksleen te Alzey van de graven van Zutphen
- Warner, David A. (Translator), Ottonian Germany: The Chronicon of Thiermar of Merseburg, Manchester University Press, Manchester, 2001
