= Ruotger =

Ruotger may refer to:

- Ruotger of Trier, archbishop (r. 915–931)
- Ruotger of Cologne (fl. 965), biographer
- Ruotger von Kerkow, bishop of Brandenburg (r. 1241–1251)

== See also ==
- Rutger, the given name
