= Sigard, Count in Luihgau and Hainaut =

Sigard, or Sigehard, was a tenth-century Lotharingian count in Hainaut and Liugas, between Liège (present-day Belgium) and Aachen (present-day Germany). Various relationships to others have been proposed for him, but these are all uncertain.

Leon Vanderkindere proposed that this Sigehard was given the county of Hainaut while Reginar I was out of favour, however it is impossible to prove that Reginar ever held it.

- 902. The county of "Sigarhard" included Wandre and Esneux in the pagus of Liugas (in pago Leuchia in comitatu Sigarhardi).
- In 905 Rouvreux, Foccroule, Noidré and Lillé (Rouoreiz, Felderolas, Nordereit, Leleias) are described as being in pago et comitatu Liuuensi, indicating they were in a county of the same name as the pagus, but the count holding this jurisdiction is not named.
- 908. He was recorded once as a count who was present agreements made about both Lobbes Abbey (Laubacensum abbatiam), which was described as part of the county and pagus of Hainaut (in pago ac in comitatu Hainuensi sitem), and Theux, which was described as being in the pagus and county of Liugas (in pago ac in comitatu Liwensi positum).
- 915. Theux is described as being both in the pagus of Liugas and the county of Sigehard (in pago Leuviensi atque in comitatus Sichardi sitam).
- 920. He was also recorded as a "venerable" count in a document concerning Crespin Abbey in Hainaut, concerning a grant. According to Nonn, the record shows that he had held the land involved.

== Sources ==
- Nonn, Ulrich (1983) Pagus und Comitatus
