= Reginar V of Mons =

Reginar V
- Count of Mons
- Born: 995
- Died: 1039 (aged 44)
- Noble family: House of Reginar
- Spouse: Mathilde of Verdun
- Issue: Herman, Count of Hainaut
- Father: Reginar IV, Count of Mons
- Mother: Hedwig of France

Reginar V (c. 995–1039), was the eldest son of Reginar IV, Count of Mons and Hedwig of France. His maternal grandparents were Hugh Capet of France and Adelaide of Aquitaine.

Reginar inherited his father's precarious position as count of Mons, which was a part of Hainaut, and through his marriage to a member of his family's traditional enemies, the House of Ardenne, he not only consolidated that position, but also gained comital status in the neighbouring southwestern part of Brabant. This included the frontier fort at Ename which faced the powerful County of Flanders in the Kingdom of France, who had taken control of the western part of Hainaut in Valenciennes.

== History and Family ==
He succeeded his father as Count of Mons in 1013. He married Mathilde of Verdun, daughter of Herman, Count of Verdun and his wife Mathilde.

He also acquired the southern part of the Brabant province around 1024.

He was succeeded as Count of Mons by his son Herman, who was married to Richilde, Countess of Mons and Hainaut. Upon the death of Herman, control of the county passed to Richilde's second husband, Baldwin VI, Count of Flanders.

== Sources ==
- Napran, Laura (Translator), Gilbert of Mons, Chronicle of Hainaut, Boydell Press, Suffolk, 2005
- Varenbergh, Emile, Herman, Académie royale de Belgique, Biographie nationale, vol. 9, Bruxelles, 1887 [détail des éditions], p. 257-258

Preceded by Reginar IV	Count of Mons; 1013–1039	Succeeded by Herman and Richilde
