= Godfrey I =

Godfrey I may refer to:

- Godfrey I, Duke of Lower Lorraine (died in 964)
- Godfrey I, Count of Verdun (died in 1002)
- Godfrey I, Count of Louvain (c. 1060 – 25 January 1139)
