= Balderic II of Liège =

19th Bishop of Liège from 1008 (died 1018)

Baldrick II (died 29 June 1018) was bishop of Liège from 1008 to his death at Heerewaarden in what is now the Netherlands.

He was the nineteenth holder of that office and as Notker's successor can be considered the second "prince-bishop" of Liège.

In 1015-1018 he founded St James's Church in the city.

== Family ==
Balderic is believed to be a relative of his namesake Bishop Balderic of Utrecht, whose nephew Balderic I of Liège, shared not only the name but had also been a previous Bishop in Liège. Daris, Vanderkindere and Baerten all argued that he is likely to be son of Balderic I's younger brother Rudolf.

Medieval sources describe Balderic as brother of the Giselbert of Loon, the first certain Count of Loon, which was within the spiritual jurisdiction of Liège, and not far from Liege itself. As pointed out by Hubert Van der Weerd, the counts also established a collegiate church at their first seat in Borgloon, dedicated to Saint Odulphus, who was associated with Utrecht.

As mentioned by Kupper, Balderic II is also described in medieval sources as a kinsman of Arnulf of Valenciennes, Dirk III, Count of Holland, and Lambert I, Count of Louvain.

== Career ==
The Annals of Hildesheim say that before being bishop he held the office of a "vicedomnus". He served as chaplain to emperors Otto III and Henry II. According to Kupper he is probably the cleric and chaplain of the emperor mentioned in a royal charter of 1001.

He died at Heerewaarden of illness; just before the battle of Vlaardingen.

== Bibliography ==
- Baerten, Jean (1969) Het graafschap Loon (11e - 14e eeuw), Maaslandse monografieën 9 (Assen Van Gorcum)
- Kupper, Jean-Louis. (1981) Liège et l’Église impériale aux XIe-XIIe siècles [en línea]. Liége: Presses universitaires de Liège ISBN 9782821828681. doi:10.4000/books.pulg.1472. http://books.openedition.org/pulg/1472
- Jacques Stiennon. (1951) Étude sur le chartrier et le domaine de V abbaye de Saint- Jacques de Liège (1015-1209) http://www.chokier.com/FILES/STJACQUES/SJStiennon4.html
- Vanderkindere, L. (1902) La formation territoriale des princippautés belges au moyen âge I (Brussel)

== Primary sources ==
Catholic Church titles
Preceded by Notger	Bishop of Liège; 1008–1018	Succeeded by Wolbodo
