= Hedwig of France, Countess of Mons =

Countess of Mons, Hugh Capet's daughter

Hedwig of France
- Countess of Mons
- Born: c. 970
- Died: after 1013
- Spouse: Reginar IV of Hainaut (m. 996; died 1013)
- Issue: Lambert; Reginar V Beatrix; Ermentrude
- House: Capet
- Father: Hugh Capet
- Mother: Adelaide of Aquitaine

Hedwig of France (c. 970 – after 1013), also called Avoise, Hadevide or Haltude, was Countess of Mons. She was the daughter of Hugh Capet, the first Capetian king of France, and his wife, Adelaide of Aquitaine.

== Family ==
In 996 Hedwig married Reginar IV of Hainaut (947–1013). Their children were:

- Reginar V, Count of Mons
- Gisèle (998–1049), who married Wautier III d'Olhain
- Lambert
- Beatrix, who married Ebles I, Count of Rheims and Roucy
- Ermentrude, died at the age of two or three; buried in the Collegiate Church of Saint Gertrude in Nivelles, Belgium. The burial came to light during an excavation. A lead cross, inscribed with her name and that of her parents, was found in the tomb.

== Death ==
Following the death of her first husband, Hedwig remarried to Hugh de Dagsbourg. She died after 1013.

== Sources ==
- Bachrach, Bernard S.; Bachrach, David S.; Leese, Michael, eds. (2018). Deeds of the Bishops of Cambrai, Translation and Commentary. Routledge.
- Bouchard, Constance Brittain (2001). Those of My Blood: Creating Noble Families in Medieval Francia. University of Pennsylvania Press.
