= Rudolf I of Ivois =

10th century Count of Ivois

Rudolfe I (Rudolf, Raoul) (died before 946 or 948) was the Count of Ivois.

== Family ==
Léon Vanderkindere has speculated (1900, p. 342) that, based on his connection to Velm, mentioned in an act made by his son Conrad before he died, it is "not without some likelihood" that he is a member of the Regnarid family, where the name Rodolphe was familiar.

Rudolfe married Eva (d. after 946) and they had three children:

- Rudolfe II (d. 963), Count of Ivois and Verdun
- Conrad (killed at the Battle of Cotrone on 15 July 982)
- Hildegonde, married first Walfrid (d. 955) and second Odacre (d. after 991), Count of Saarbrücken.

Rudolfe was succeeded as Count of Ivois by his son Rudolfe II.

== Sources ==
- Vanderkindere, Léon, La Formation territoriale des principautés belges au Moyen Âge, Bruxelles, H. Lamertin, 1902
