= Richer, Count in Luihgau and Hainaut =

Lotharingian count

Richar or Richer (died 16 October 972) was a 10th-century Lotharingian count. He had a well-attested county in the Luihgau, a territory between Liège and Aachen, and he is generally considered to have held comital status in the County of Hainaut, possibly in the area of Mons.

== Life ==
After the death of Duke Godfrey, count of Hainaut and Duke of Lower Lotharingia in 964 in Italy, it has been proposed that the Emperor Otto I gave Count Richar at least part of the county of Hainault.

Count Richar appears in a charter of 2 June 965 making a grant of land at St Villers St Ghislain in memory of Duke Godfrey.

In 966 Count Richar was described in a royal charter, as the count holding a county in Liuhgow which included Voeren (Furon), and Cortils in Blegny (Curcella). They were described as being in pago Liuhgouui in comitatu Richarii.

In 972 Richer was killed in an attack upon his apparent uncle, Wigfried, Bishop of Verdun, by a certain Count Sigebert in "Wandersalis". This was described in the chronicle of the bishops of Verdun. Scholars note the following evidence for the relationships:

- In a grant of 973 to St Pauls in Verdun, Bishop Wigfried, granted land at Lockweiler arranged between him and his two relatives (sobrini), Count Luithard and his brother Count Richwin, for the soul of his nephew (nepos) Count Richer.
- 15 March 973, the emperor Otto I granted Eckfeld in the Eifel to the Abbey of Echternach, which Count Richar had previously held.
- Richer was memorialized in both St Paul in Verdun and St Gereon in Cologne on 16 October.

In 973, after the death of Richer, a Count "Richizo", appears in a Hainaut grant concerning Crespin Abbey. Richizo is a name form which could be short for a name beginning with Rich-. Although this Richizo has sometimes been equated to Richer himself, Hlawitschka argued in 1969 that this must be the above-mentioned apparent brother of Richer, Count Richwin.

Also in 973, after Richer died there was a battle near Mons where Reginar IV and Lambert I attempted to take it over. It was defended by two brothers, Count Werner and Renaud, who were both killed. Hlawitschka believes they may have been brothers of Richer, or in any case close relatives.

== Legacy ==
It has been proposed, for example by Leon Vanderkindere, that he had at least one child, mentioned by Alpertus of Metz as a son of a "Richizo":

- Godizo of Aspel Heimbach (d. 1011–1015)

However, it is argued by Hlawitschka that Richizo is a short form name for Richwin, and that Richwin was a different count, probably closely related to Richer. This Richizo, thought to be Richwin, appears in a Hainaut record in 973, after the death of Richar.

== Bibliography ==
- Hlawitschka, Eduard (1969), Die Anfänge des Hauses Habsburg-Lothringen. Genealogische Untersuchungen zur Geschichte Lothringens und des Reiches im 9., 10. und 11. Jahrhundert
- Nonn, Ulrich (1983), Pagus und Comitatus
- Vanderkindere, Léon (1902), "Chapter 10", La formation territoriale des principautés belges au Moyen Age (PDF), vol. 2, pp. 159–183
- Verdonk, Henk (2012), Aarts, Bas (ed.), Alzey-Zutphen. Een onderzoek naar het rijksleen te Alzey van de graven van Zutphen
