= Heriger of Lobbes =

Benedictine monk (c. 925–1007)

Herigerus (c. 925 – 31 October 1007) was a Benedictine monk, often known as Heriger of Lobbes for serving as abbot of the abbey of Lobbes between 990 and 1007. Remembered for his writings as theologian and historian, Herigerus was a teacher to numerous scholars. His biography describes him as "skilled in the art of music", though no music theory treatise survives and neither do the two antiphons and one hymn attributed to him.

== Life and career ==
After studying at the cathedral school of Liège, Heriger became a Benedictine monk at the monastery of Lobbes, where he was scholasticus of the monastic school for many years.

In 990, when Folcwin died, the monks wrote a letter to Notger, bishop of Liège, and to Rothard, bishop of Cambrai, to have Heriger as the new Abbot of Lobbes. The request was honored and Heriger was consecrated on the feast of St. Thomas in 990.

Heriger was an intimate friend of bishop Notger of Liège, whom he accompanied to Rome in 989, and at whose instance he wrote several historical works, with a focus on historical criticism.

Pupils of Heriger included:

- Burchard, bishop of Worms
- Adalbold, bishop of Utrecht
- Olbert, abbot of Gembloux
- Wazo of Liège
- Hugo, later abbot of Lobbes

== Works ==
Heriger's chief work is a history of the bishops of Liège, Gesta episcoporum Leodiensium, which however reaches only to the death of St. Remaclus in 667. It was first published by Jean Chapeauville; a second edition was issued by Martène and Durand. Finally, it was published with a historical disquisition on the writings of Heriger by Köpke whence it was reprinted by Migne. The history was continued to the year 1048 by Anselm of Liège.

Heriger's other writings are:

- the "Life of St. Landoald"
- a metrical "Life of St. Ursmar", of which only a few fragments remain
- a few other works on hagiological and liturgical subjects.

Most of these works are printed by Migne.

The "Life of the Virgin St. Berlendis" has long be assigned to Heriger, but only dates from mid 11th century. It certainly belongs to the hagiographic tradition introduced by Heriger and seems to be the work of one of his pupils, abbot Hugo of Lobbes (+1053).

A treatise on the Body and Blood of Christ, "De Corpore et Sanguine Domini" or "Exaggeratio plurimorum auctorum de Corpore et Sanguine Domini," mostly a compilation of excerpts from the Church Fathers, was formerly attributed to Heriger, but is now attributed to Paschasius Radbertus.

Heriger is also the author of an arithmetical work entitled Regulæ de numerorum abaci rationibus.

He is recorded as being "skilled in the art of music" and a composer, although none of his musical works survive. Written records mention two of his antiphons, O Thomas Dydime and O Thomas apostole a hymn.

== Sources ==
- "Heriger of Lobbes". Catholic Encyclopedia.
- Lutz, Cora E. (1977). Schoolmasters of the Tenth Century. Archon Books.
- Huglo, Michel (2001). "Herigerus". Grove Music Online. Oxford: Oxford University Press. doi:10.1093/gmo/9781561592630.article.12853. ISBN 978-1-56159-263-0. (subscription, Wikilibrary access, or UK public library membership required)
