= St James's Church, Liège =

Church of St. James the Less
- Église Saint-Jacques-le-Mineur (French)
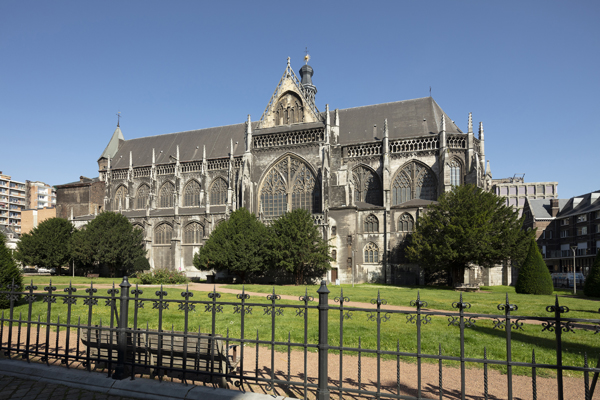
- St. James's Church
- Church of St. James the Less
- 50.636994°N 5.570428°E
- Location: Rue du Vertbois / Rue Eugène Ysaye; 4000 Liège, Liège Province, Wallonia
- Country: Belgium
- Denomination: Roman Catholic
- Website: Official website

History
- Dedication: James the Lesser

Architecture
- Architectural type: Cathedral
- Style: Gothic
- Groundbreaking: 1015
- Completed: 1519

Administration
- Diocese: Liège

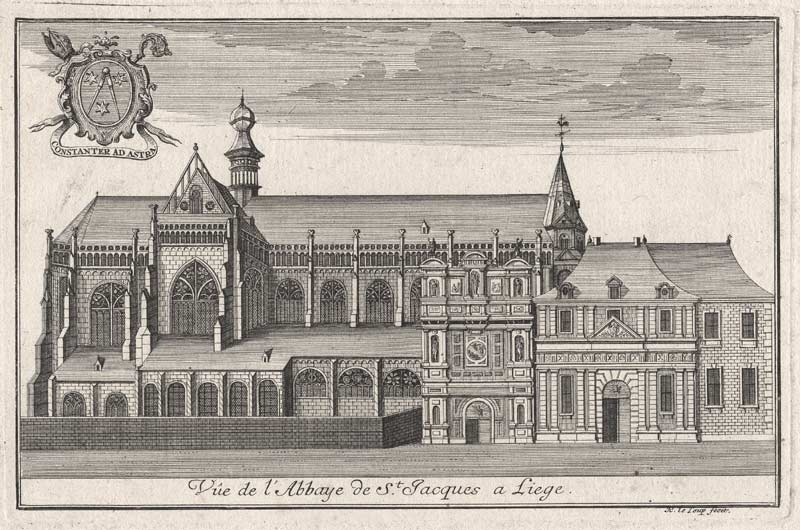
Engraving of Saint James Church (1735)

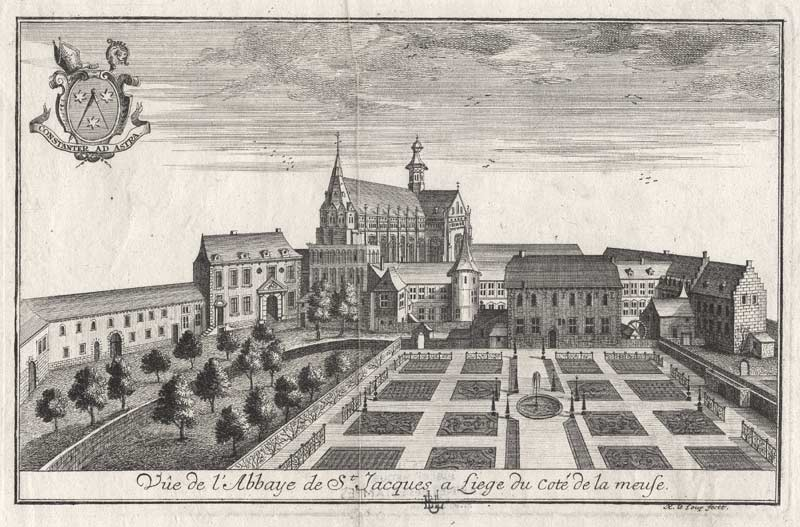
Engraving of Saint James Abbey, viewed from the Meuse

St. James's Church (or in full, the Church of St. James the Less; French: Église Saint-Jacques-le-Mineur) is a Roman Catholic church located in the center of Liège, Belgium. Originally the abbey church of Saint James Abbey, founded in 1015 by Prince-Bishop Balderic II, successor of Notker, it later became Saint James's Collegiate Church, following the destruction of Saint Peter's Collegiate Church. After the Concordat of 1801, Saint James became a parish church. The main cloister of the abbey was transformed into a public park, and the abbey buildings were demolished.

== History ==
=== The abbey ===
The abbey was always dedicated to Saint James the Less, although it is often associated with the apostle of Compostela. From the beginning, the monastic school became famous, and the abbey flourished; the monks founded the monastery of Lubin in Poland, as well as the priory of Saint-Léonard in the northern district of Liège.

The abbey church housed the tomb of a foreign bishop named John: a sarcophagus with a recumbent effigy in tuff, dressed in pontifical vestments, with his head under a canopy and feet under a console. Replaced in Saint James in 1906 by a copy from the sculptor Paul Roemaet of Louvain, the original was transferred to Saint Paul's Cathedral and reassembled in the archdeacon's room of the Cathedral's treasury. Little is known about John, an Italian bishop in exile, a painter called by Otto III to decorate the church of Aachen. His Latin epitaph was transcribed by the chronicler Gilles d'Orval around 1250:

Stop, read what you see, and let your tender heart pity me
The tomb tells what I am, the inscription what I was.
Born in Italy, invested with the episcopate, I, John, had to flee, driven from my episcopal seat
Exiled without honor, I was sent to these regions
The compassionate city of Liège gave me asylum
Saint James, remember your faithful pupil,
it was on my advice that this home was built in your honor.

Indeed, John is said to have advised Bishop Balderic, successor of Notker, to build the Benedictine monastery of Saint James; it was Abbot John of Coromeuse (1507-1525), builder of the Gothic church, who restored the honor of Bishop John's tomb, and Dean Émile Scoolmeester who saved the monument in 1906. The new mausoleum preserves the prelate's bones, and tradition has it that miracles occurred near them.

=== Collegiate to parish church ===
The Saint James Abbey was secularized by Pope Pius VI on 28 May 1785, and transformed into a collegiate church for twenty-five canons. Emperor Joseph II approved this change on 31 July. The same pope suppressed the Saint Gilles Abbey on 27 June 1786, and combined its revenues with those of Saint James, where seven new canonries reducible to five were established for the monks of Saint Gilles. The new chapter then consisted of thirty canons, like those of other collegiate churches in Liège.

After the Concordat of 1801, the church was returned to worship in 1803 as a parish church. It was first restored in the 19th century, from 1832 to 1869, by architects Jean-Charles Delsaux and Auguste Van Assche. The second major restoration took place between 1972 and 1975; archaeological excavations at that time uncovered the remains of the Romanesque crypt and the foundations of the original church.

== Description ==
The current Gothic church, whose construction was completed in 1538, replaced the original Romanesque church. The vault and its paintings are from the same period, as well as the stained glass windows in the choir, dating from 1525 to 1531. The Renaissance portal, added in 1558, is attributed to Lambert Lombard. The original church had a Romanesque narthex and an octagonal tower dating from around 1170. Only the narthex with one of its three towers has been preserved.

Among the most remarkable elements are the nave, a true stone lacework; the vault with more than 150 keystones in the central nave; the choir stalls from the 14th century; the Renaissance pipe organ case and its Renaissance-style instrument, reconstructed by the Schumacher Organ Manufacture of Eupen; the stained glass windows with the coats of arms of the 32 old trades (16th century); the Baroque statues by Del Cour and his school (late 17th century); and the Coronation of the Virgin (sculpted group from the 14th century).

== Structure and dimensions ==
The church measures 90 metres (300 ft) long, from the narthex to the radiating chapel of the apse. The nave, consisting of six bays and flanked by aisles, is 38 m long and 11.5 m wide. The vaults rise 22.5 m above the ground. The choir, 23 m long, ends in a semi-circular apse with five sections, each flanked at the base by a radiating chapel. Like most churches, Saint-Jacques has a Latin cross layout with a transept slightly over 26 m long.

=== Stained glass windows ===
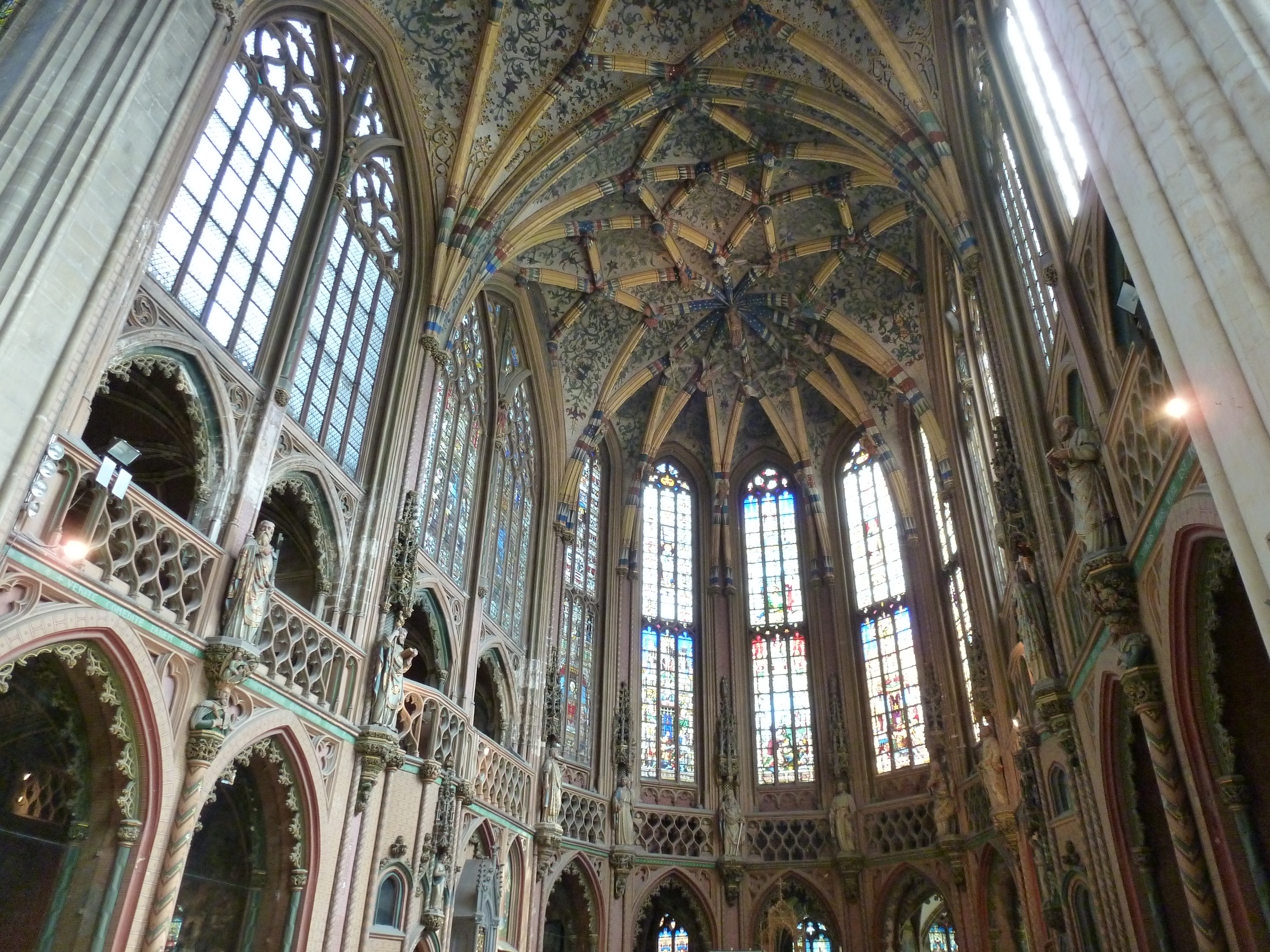
The stained glass windows of the apse.

The stained glass windows of Saint-Jacques are considered by some authors to be perhaps the most beautiful in Belgium, the French archaeologist Adolphe Napoléon Didron even ranks them as the best among all surviving from the 16th century.

=== Apse ===
The apse features five stained glass windows created and installed between 1525 and 1531. They were restored between 1838 and 1841 by Jean-Baptiste Capronnier. These windows were largely donated by the families of Hornes and de la Marck, following years of hatred and hostilities, during the reconciliation of these lineages through the union of Marguerite, daughter of Jacques de Hornes, with Évrard IV de La Marck, son of Évrard III de La Marck.

The large stained glass window on the left is dated 1531 and depicts the donor Jacques III de Hornes, a Knight of the Order of the Golden Fleece, kneeling before the Holy Trinity, protected by Saint James; behind him are his two wives, Marguerite de Croy and Claudine de Savoie, kneeling before Our Lady of Sorrows, their patron saints, along with the greyhound, symbolizing fidelity. The entire scene is surrounded by sixteen heraldic shields representing the donor’s paternal and maternal lineage; in the upper part and the interlaces, Christ and angels bear attributes.

The next stained glass window was donated in 1531 by Richard de Mérode and Arnould le Blavier, burgomasters of Liège. In the center, Saint John the Baptist points to the Lamb of God; the two side bays feature the coats of arms of the thirty-two guilds of Liège, and in the lower section, the coat of arms of the city with its two patrons: Our Lady and Saint Lambert.

The following stained glass window was donated by Jean de Hornes in 1529; protected by Saint Lambert, the provost of the Chapter of Saint Lambert pays homage to the Virgin Mary and the Christ Child with his window; in the upper part, the figure of Saint James the Less is surrounded by the donor’s sixteen heraldic shields.

The central window was donated by Jean de Cromois, abbot of Saint-Jacques from 1506 to 1525; it depicts the sacrifice of Calvary, that of Isaac, and the Bronze Serpent, both of the latter being prophetic of the Cross.

The next stained glass window, dated 1525, represents Saint Andrew with the sixteen heraldic shields of the donor Évrard III de La Marck, presented by Saint Christopher and kneeling before the Savior who raises his hand to bless him.

Finally, the last stained glass window shows Marguerite de Hornes, wife of Évrard IV de La Marck; behind her are her patron saint and the Virgin, surrounded by a full halo. At the top, Saint John the Evangelist and the donor’s heraldic shields.

== Index of artists ==
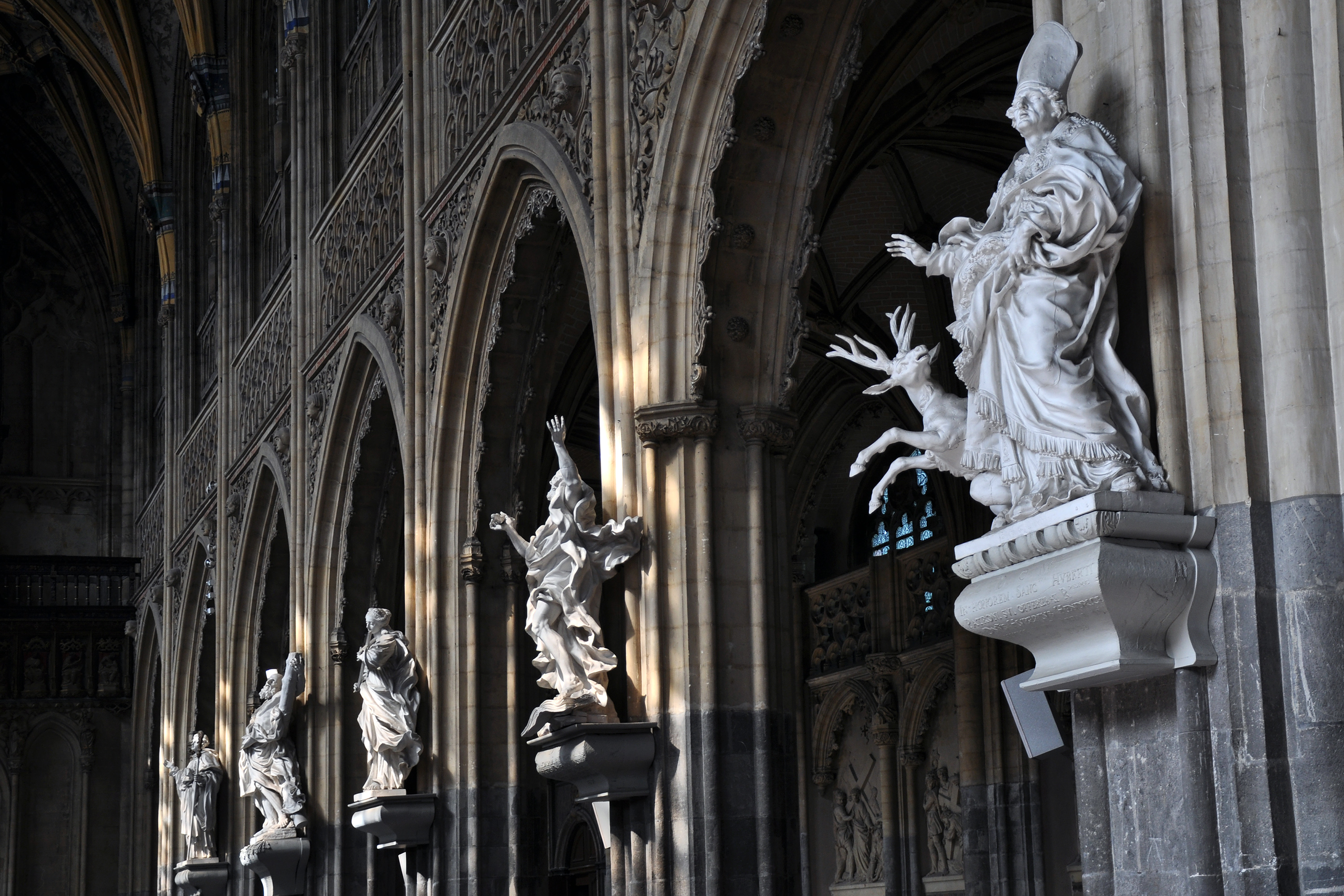
Sculptures in the nave

A chronological list of artists who worked on the Saint-Jacques Church or whose work is found in the church.

- Lambert Lombard (1506-1566), architect.
- Arnold de Hontoire (1630-1709), sculptor.
  - Statue of Saint Andrew
- Jean Del Cour (1631-1707), 8 limewood sculptures (1682-1696)
  - Saint James the Greater (1682)
  - Saint Benedict (1684)
  - Saint Hubert (1689)
  - Saint Henry (1689)
  - Saint Nicholas (1685). Disappeared.
  - Saint Scholastica (1691)
  - Saint James the Less (1691)
  - Immaculate Conception (1696). Moved to Floreffe.
- Louis-Eugène Simonis (1810-1882), sculptor.
- Édouard van Marcke (1815-1884), painter.
- Jean-Charles Delsaux (1821-1893), architect.
- Jules Helbig (1821-1906), painter.
- Auguste Van Assche (1826-1907), architect.
- Jules Halkin (1830-1888), sculptor.
- Joseph Osterrath (1845-1898), master glassmaker.
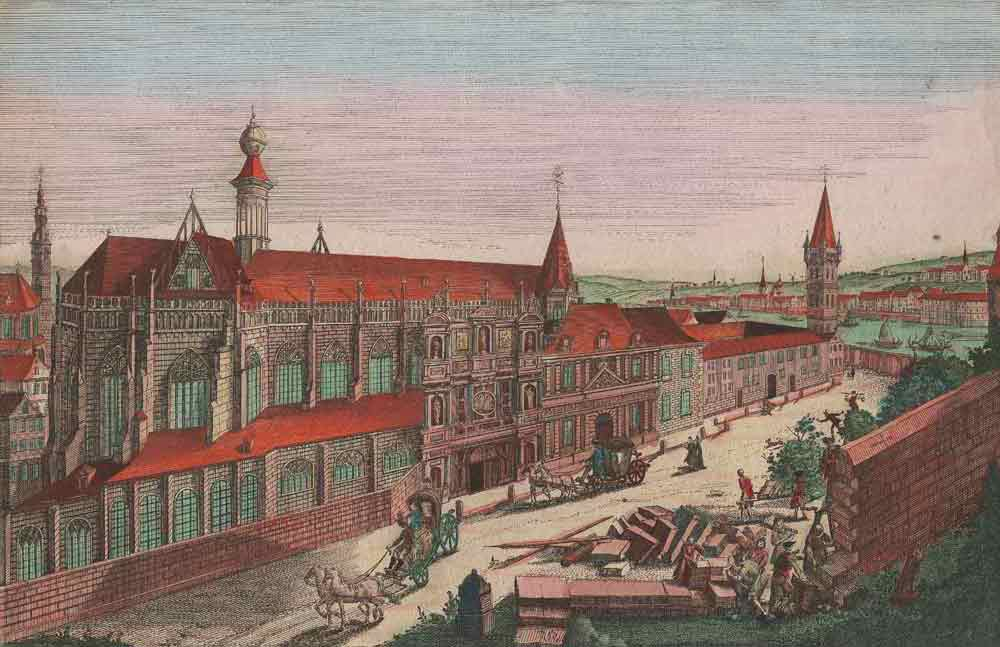

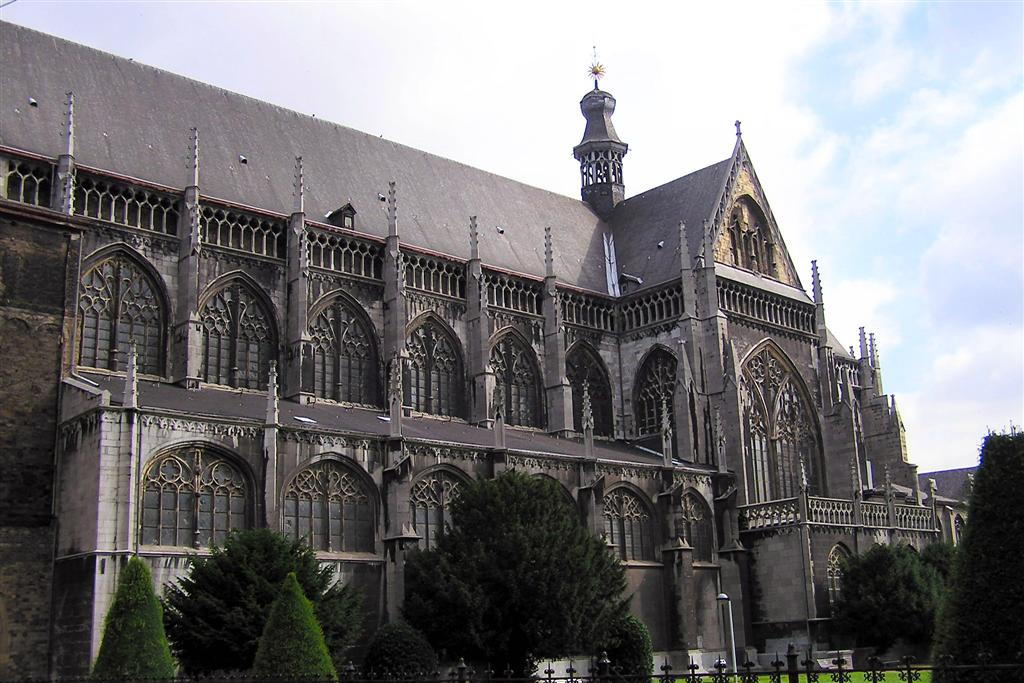

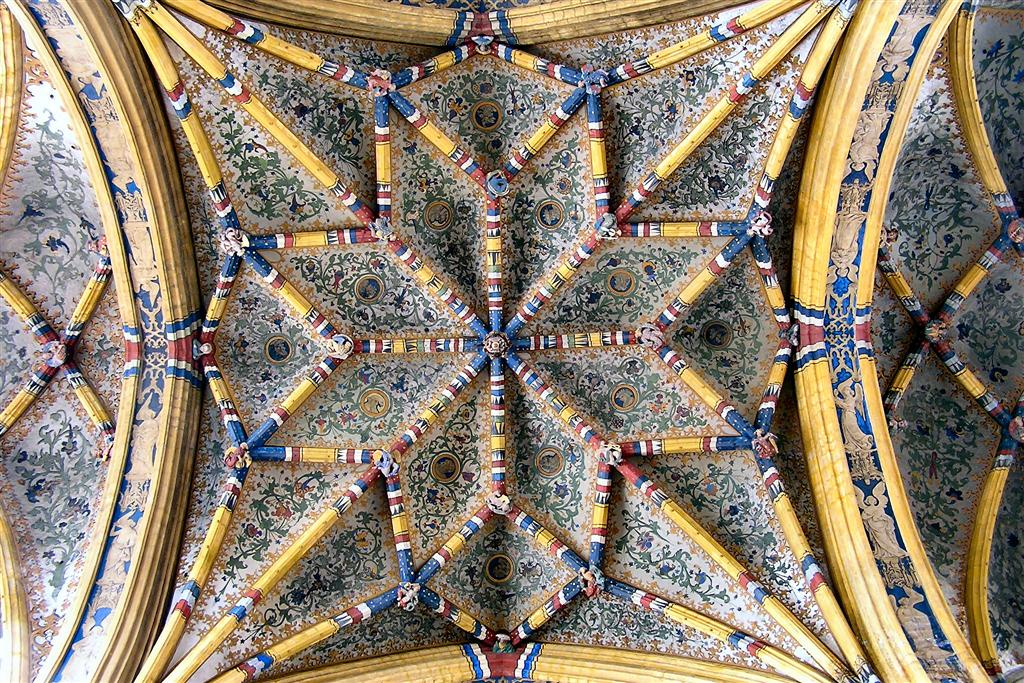

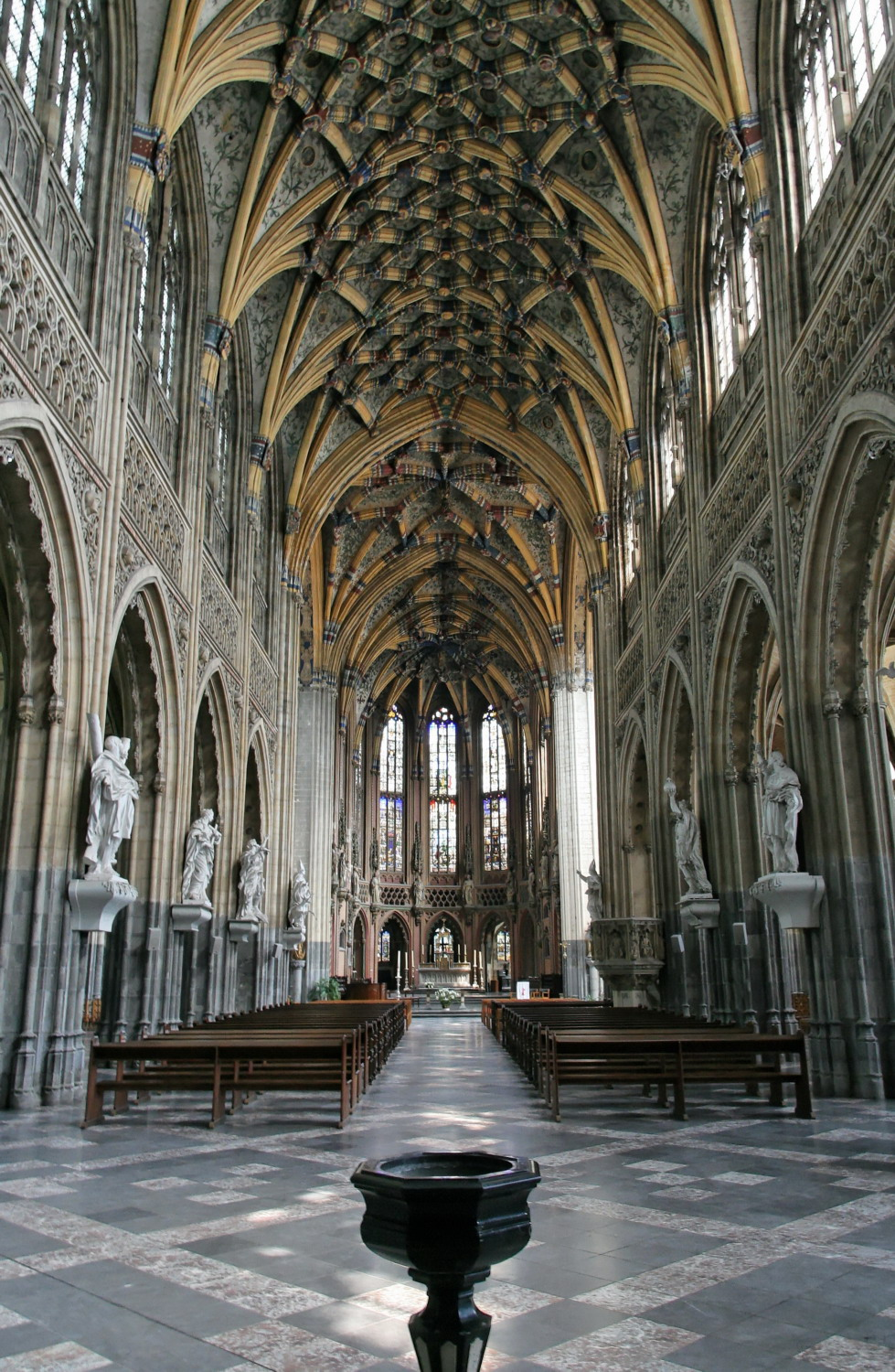

== Sources ==
- https://www.steden.net/belgie/luik/sint-jacobskerk/
