= Ruotger of Cologne =

Ruotger was a 10th-century Benedictine monk and Latin writer of Cologne.

Ruotger probably belonged to a Lotharingian family. He received a good education, possibly at the Abbey of Saint Maximin in Trier. He became a monk at the Abbey of Saint Pantaleon in Cologne, where he worked as a historian and hagiographer, possibly even as schoolmaster.

Start of the Life of Bruno in a medieval manuscript

Ruotger was commissioned by the archbishop of Cologne, Folcmar (965–969), to write a biography of Folcmar's predecessor, Bruno the Great. He was probably chosen for the task on account of his broad classical and biblical education and his skill as a writer. He had known Bruno personally. His Life of Bruno (or Vita Brunonis) is biography, not hagiography. While he presents Bruno as a peacemaker, he does not present him as a saint. He states specifically that those who visited Bruno's tomb "did not look for miracles, but paid attention to his life and recollected his teaching."

Ruotger was seemingly an accurate historian. His account is corroborated in places by other sources, like Thietmar of Merseburg, Flodoard of Rheims and the Life of John of Gorze. According to Henry Mayr-Harting, it is "unlikely that [Ruotger] got his facts wrong to any significant degree." It is not, however, an impartial account. It is an apologetic for Bruno's life and pastorate, especially his combination of ecclesiastical and military office. Indirectly, it is also a defence of the reigning emperor, Bruno's elder brother, Otto the Great.

The Life of Bruno is preserved in at least eight manuscripts. The autograph is lost; the earliest copy is from the 11th century. In the 12th century, an unknown writer penned another biography of Bruno, Vita Brunonis altera. It is based mainly on Ruotger, but it does contain some new details.

== Bibliography ==
- Bauer, Thomas (2005). "Ruotger". Neue Deutsche Biographie. Vol. 22. Duncker & Humblot. pp. 269–270.
- Mayr-Harting, Henry (2007). Church and Cosmos in Early Ottonian Germany: The View from Cologne. Oxford University Press.
- Ott, Irene, ed. (1951). Ruotgers Lebenschreibung des Erzbischofs Bruno von Köln. Hermann Böhlaus.
