= Notker =

Notker or Notger is a masculine Germanic given name. Notable people with the given name include:

== Historical ==
- Notker the Stammerer ("Notker I"; c. 840–912), Latin poet, possibly composer and monk in Saint Gall
- Notker Physicus ("Notker II"; c. 900–975), physician and painter
- Notker Labeo ("Notker III"; c. 950–1022), monk in Saint Gall and author
- Notker (abbot of Saint Gall) (died 975), nephew of Notker Physicus
- Notker of Liège (c. 940–1008), provost of Saint Gall and later first Prince-Bishop of Liège

== Contemporary ==
- Notker Füglister (1931–1996), Catholic theologian
- Notker Wolf (1940–2024), the ninth Abbot Primate of the Benedictine Confederation of the Order of Saint Benedict
