= Wandre =

Wandre Wande (Walloon)
- Sub-municipality of Liège
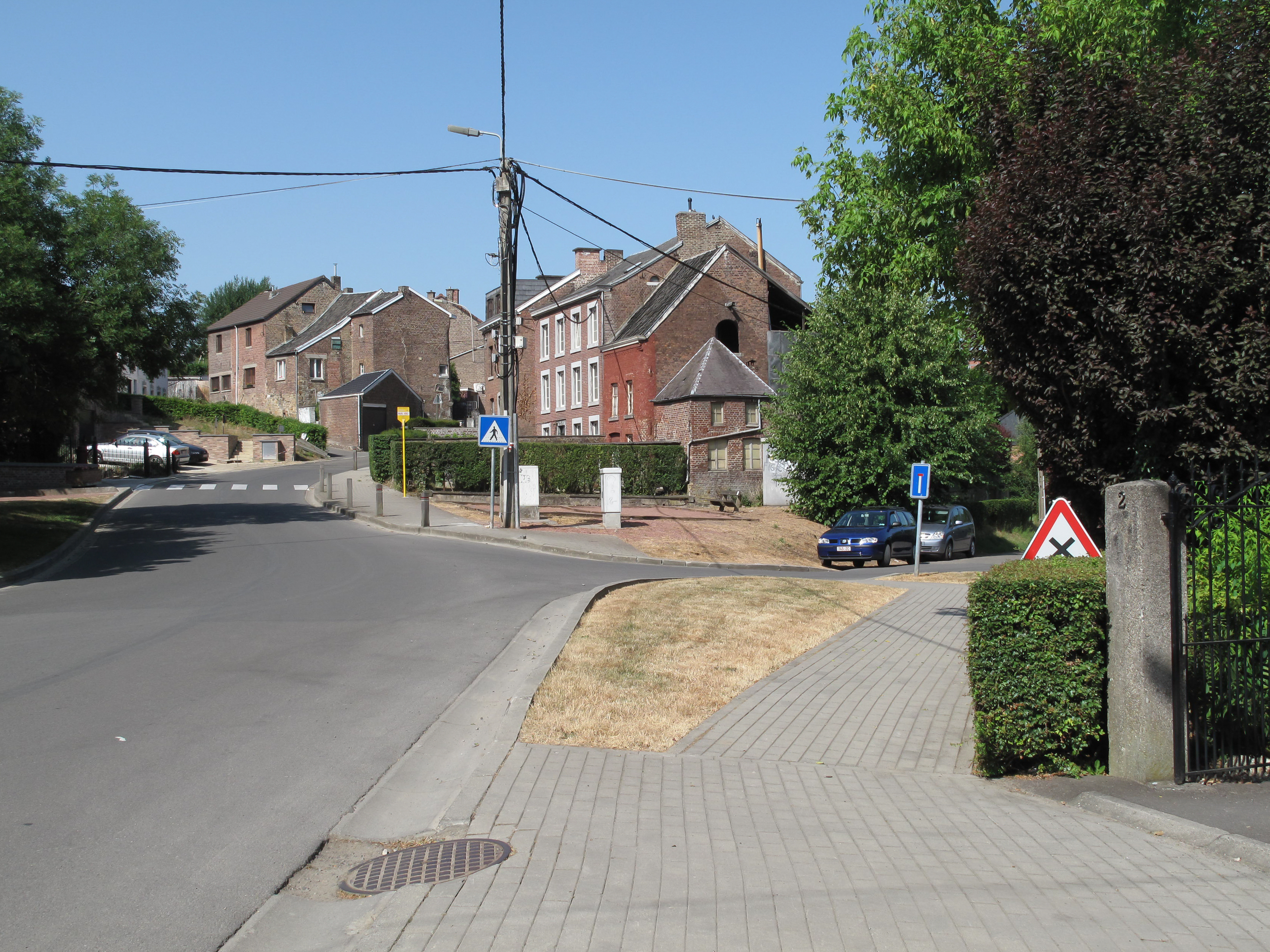

- Location in Liège
- Interactive map of Wandre
- Location within Belgium Location within Liège Province
- Coordinates: 50°40′00″N 5°39′00″E
- Country: Belgium
- Community: French Community
- Region: Wallonia
- Province: Liège
- Arrondissement: Liège
- Municipality: Liège

Area
  - Total: 4.30 km^{2} (1.66 sq mi)

Population (2020-01-01)
  - Total: 6,139
  - Density: 1,430/km^{2} (3,700/sq mi)
- Postal codes: 4020
- Area codes: 04

Wandre (French pronunciation: [wɑ̃dʁ]; Walloon: Wande) is a sub-municipality of the city of Liège located in the province of Liège, Wallonia, Belgium. It was a separate municipality until 1977. On 1 January 1977, it was merged into Liège.
