= Bruno the Great =

Archbishop of Cologne; Lotharingian Duke (925–965)

Saint Bruno the Great
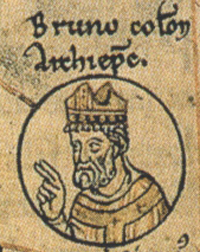
- Posthumous 12th century manuscript drawing

Archbishop, Duke
- Born: May 925
- Died: 11 October 965; Reims, County of Vermandois
- Venerated in: Roman Catholic Church; Eastern Orthodox Church
- Major shrine: Church of St. Pantaleon
- Feast: 11 October

Bruno the Great (May 925 – 11 October 965) was the archbishop of Cologne from 953 until his death and the duke of Lotharingia after 954. He was the youngest brother of Emperor Otto I.

== Life ==
Bruno was the youngest son of King Henry the Fowler and Matilda of Ringelheim. While he was still a child, it was decided that he should pursue a clerical career. In the early 940s he was educated in Trier by the leading scholar, Israel the Grammarian. In 951, Otto appointed Bruno as his archchaplain.

Bruno soon received further advancement. In 953, the Archbishopric of Cologne fell vacant just when Duke Conrad the Red of Lotharingia, Otto's son-in-law, had joined a rebellion against Otto. By appointing Bruno to the vacant position, Otto provided himself with a powerful ally against Conrad (much of Lotharingia fell under the archdiocese of Cologne) just when he needed one most. By the next year, the rebellion had collapsed. Otto deposed Conrad as duke of Lotharingia and appointed Bruno in his place.

Bruno was to be almost the last duke of the whole of Lotharingia: in 959 two local nobles, Godfrey and Frederick, were appointed as margraves of Lower Lotharingia and Upper Lotharingia respectively. Both margraves were recognised as dukes after Bruno's death. The two duchies were reunited between 1033 and 1044 under Gothelo.

The combined positions of archbishop and duke — or archduke, as his biographer Ruotger called him — made Bruno the most powerful man after Otto, not just in Germany but also beyond its borders. After the deaths of Louis IV of France in 954 and Hugh the Great, his most powerful feudatory, in 956, Bruno, as brother-in-law to both of them and maternal uncle to their heirs Lothair, the new king, and Hugh Capet, acted as regent of west Francia.

From 962 onwards, Bruno was also appointed as Otto's regent in Germany while Otto was absent in Italy. Bruno died in Reims in 965 and was buried in the monastery of St Pantaleon, which he had founded, just outside Cologne.

== Legacy ==
Bruno's position in Cologne was little short of royal. Indeed, Otto delegated to Bruno and his successors as archbishop a number of normally royal privileges — the right to build fortifications and set up markets, to strike coins and collect (and keep) such taxes as the special ones on Jews in return for royal protection, those on market trading and tolls from traffic along the Rhine. Even though Bruno's successors as archbishops would not be dukes as well, they would be the secular as well as the ecclesiastical rulers of Cologne until the battle of Worringen three centuries later.

Bruno's court in Cologne was the main intellectual and artistic centre of its period in Germany — far more so than that of his brother Otto, which was far more peripatetic and militarily oriented. Among others, Ratherius and Liutprand of Cremona spent time at the court. Many of the next generation of German ecclesiastical leaders were educated at Bruno's court, like Everaclus of Liège, Gerard, bishop of Toul, Wikfrid, bishop of Verdun, and Theoderic, bishop of Metz.

Bruno's effect on medieval Cologne was immense. Apart from building a palace, he extended the cathedral to the point where it was regarded as rivalling Old Saint Peter's in Rome (this cathedral burned down in 1248 and was replaced by the current one). He brought the area between the old Roman walls and the Rhine within the city fortifications; and built new churches to Saint Martin of Tours within this area and to Saint Andrew just outside the northern city wall and a Benedictine monastery dedicated to St Pantaleon to the south-west of the city.

Bruno translated St. Patroclus' relics from Troyes and buried them in 964 at St Patrokli Dom in Soest, where Patroclus is still today venerated.

== Canonisation ==
Bruno was venerated at St Pantaleon throughout the Middle Ages. Ruotger depicts him as a moral example, but not a wonderworker. In the 12th century, there was an ephemeral miracle cult at his tomb. He was formally beatified in 1870. In 1871, Archbishop Paul Melchers made 11 October a double feast in his honour. His tomb was opened in 1747 and 1892. In 1895, he was canonised. The historian Jonathan Wright situates the promotion of his cult against the background of the Kulturkampf. That is, it stemmed from a desire to preserve the Catholic identity of Cologne as it was drawn into the Protestant dominated German Empire.

== Sources ==
- Timothy Reuter, Germany in the early Middle Ages (1991, Longman. ISBN 0-582-49034-0 )
- Pierre Riché, The Carolingians: a family who forged Europe (translator Michael Idomir Allen, 1993, University of Pennsylvania Press. ISBN 0-8122-1342-4)
- Carl Dietmar and Werner Jung, Kleine illustrierte Geschichte der Stadt Köln (9th edition, 2002, J. P. Bachem Verlag, Köln. ISBN 3-7616-1482-9)
- Cora E. Lutz, Schoolmasters of the Tenth Century. Archon Books, 1977.

Catholic Church titles
Preceded by Wigfried	Archbishop of Cologne; 953–965	Succeeded by Volkmar
Regnal titles
Preceded by Conrad I	Duke of Lotharingia; 954–965	Succeeded by divided into Upper and Lower Lorraine
