= Renaud, Count of Mons =

Renaud (or Reginald) (died 973), brother of Count Werner. According to Eduard Hlawitschka (de) they were probably members of the so-called "Matfriede" noble clan.

Upon the death of Richer, Count of Mons in 972, who was possibly their brother, Renaud and his brother Werner defended Mons from the brothers Reginar IV and Lambert I.

Returning from exile in 973, the sons of Reginar III, Reginar IV, Count of Mons, and Lambert I, Count of Louvain, killed both Renaud and his brother Werner at the battle of Peronne.

== Sources ==
- Vanderkindere, L,. Régnier IV, Académie royale de Belgique, Biographie nationale, vol. 19, Bruxelles, 1907
- Warner, David A. (Translator), Ottonian Germany: The Chronicon of Thiermar of Merseburg, Manchester University Press, Manchester, 2001
- Hlawitschka, Eduard (1969), Die Anfänge des Hauses Habsburg-Lothringen. Genealogische Untersuchungen zur Geschichte Lothringens und des Reiches im 9., 10. und 11. Jahrhundert
- Vanderkindere, Léon (1902), "Chapter 10" (PDF), La formation territoriale des principautés belges au Moyen Age, vol. 2, pp. 159–183
- Verdonk, Henk (2012), Aarts, Bas (ed.), Alzey-Zutphen. Een onderzoek naar het rijksleen te Alzey van de graven van Zutphen
