= Reginar III of Hainaut =

Count of Hainaut (c. 920–973)

Reginar III
- Count of Hainaut
- Born: Brabant
- Died: before 973; Bohemia
- Noble family: Reginar
- Issue: Reginar IV, Count of Mons; Lambert I of Leuven
- Father: Reginar II, Count of Hainaut
- Mother: Adelaide of Burgundy

Reginar III (c. 920 – 973) was Count of Hainaut from approximately 940 until his exile in 958.

He was the son of Reginar II, Count of Hainaut.

He took part in the rebellion of his uncle Gilbert, Duke of Lorraine. When Gilbert was killed in 939, Reginar had to pledge fealty to King Otto the Great.

He then allied himself with King Louis IV of France, but King Otto sent duke Hermann of Swabia to quell the rebels in 944.

Otto appointed Conrad the Red as duke of Lotharingia, who tried to diminish the power of Reginar. However, when Conrad rose against Otto, Reginar supported him. In an anarchic situation, Reginar appropriated the dowry of Gerberga of Saxony, Otto's sister and mother of the French king, and also church property.

In 957, Bruno, Archbishop of Cologne, who had also been appointed duke of Lotharingia, restored order and defeated Reginar.

As Reginar refused to submit, he was exiled to Bohemia, where he died before 973.

== Family ==
He fathered two sons:

- Reginar IV, Count of Mons
- Lambert I of Leuven

Preceded by Reginar II	Count of Hainaut; 940–958	Succeeded by Godfrey I
