= Reginar IV of Mons =

Count of Mons (950–1013)

Reginar IV
- Count of Mons
- Born: 950
- Died: 1013 (aged about 63)
- Noble family: Reginar
- Spouse: Hedwig of France
- Issue: Reginar V, Count of Mons; Lambert of Mons; Beatrix
- Father: Reginar III, Count of Hainaut
- Mother: Adela

Reginar IV, Count of Mons, in Hainaut, (c. 950–1013) was the son of Reginar III and Adela. His father died in exile in Bohemia in 973.

== History ==
His father, Reginar III, was exiled in 958 as a rebel by Otto I, Holy Roman Emperor. Hainaut was held after then by Godfrey I, Duke of Lower Lorraine, but Reginar IV claimed that Mons in Hainaut had been his father's.

He attacked Mons in 973, after the death of Duke Godfrey, but did not manage to hold it, because Godfrey I, Count of Verdun then held it until he died. He managed to replace Godfrey as Count of Mons in 998.

== Family ==
Regnier IV married Hedwig, daughter of Hugh Capet and Adelaide of Poitou.

They had:

- Reginar V, Count of Mons, married Mathilde of Verdun, daughter of Herman, Count of Verdun.
- Lambert of Mons
- Beatrix, who married Ebles I, Count of Rheims and Roucy and Archbishop of Rheims.
- Ermentrude, died at the age of two or three; buried in the Collegiate Church of Saint Gertrude in Nivelles, Belgium. The burial came to light during an excavation. A lead cross, inscribed with her name and that of her parents, was found in the tomb.

== Sources ==
- Bachrach, Bernard S.; Bachrach, David S.; Leese, Michael, eds. (2018). Deeds of the Bishops of Cambrai, Translation and Commentary. Routledge.
- Le Jan, Régine (2003). Famille et pouvoir dans le monde franc (VIIe-Xe siècle), Essai d’anthropologie sociale (in French). Éditions de la Sorbonne.

Preceded by Reginald	Count of Mons; 973–974	Succeeded by Godfrey the Captive
Preceded by Godfrey the Captive	Count of Mons; 998–1013	Succeeded by Reginar V
