= Godfrey I of Lower Lorraine =

Godfrey I (born 940/945; died 964) was the count of Hainault from 958 and margrave or vice-duke of Lower Lorraine from 959, when that duchy was divided by Duke Bruno, who remained duke until his death in 964.

== Life ==
Godfrey was the son of Godfrey, Count Palatine of Lotharingia, and Ermentrude. He was a sixth generation descendant of Charlemagne and was related, through blood and marriages, to the most important royal families in Europe. His grandmother was Oda, married to Gerhard I, Count of Metz, and the widow of the Carolingian king of Lotharingia Zwentibold, also sister of Henry the Fowler, the Saxon king of Germany. His aunt, Oda, was married to Gozlin, Count of Bidgau and Methingau, and he was thus a cousin of Godfrey I, Count of Verdun, whose children later became dukes of Lower Lorraine as well. In 958, Bruno finished off the revolt of Count Reginar III and exiled him. He gave his county to Godfrey. The next year, Lorraine was divided, to make it easier to defend from enemies within and without. The lower portion went to Godfrey while the upper to one Frederick. In 962, he was made count of Jülich. He accompanied the Emperor Otto I, his first cousin once removed, into Italy, against the usurper Adalbert, in 962 and died at Rome of an epidemic in 964.

Preceded by Regnier III	Count of Hainaut; 958–964	Succeeded by Richar
Preceded by title created	Vice-Duke of Lower Lorraine; 959–964	Succeeded by Richar
