= Léon Vanderkindere =

Belgian historian, academic and politician (1842–1906)

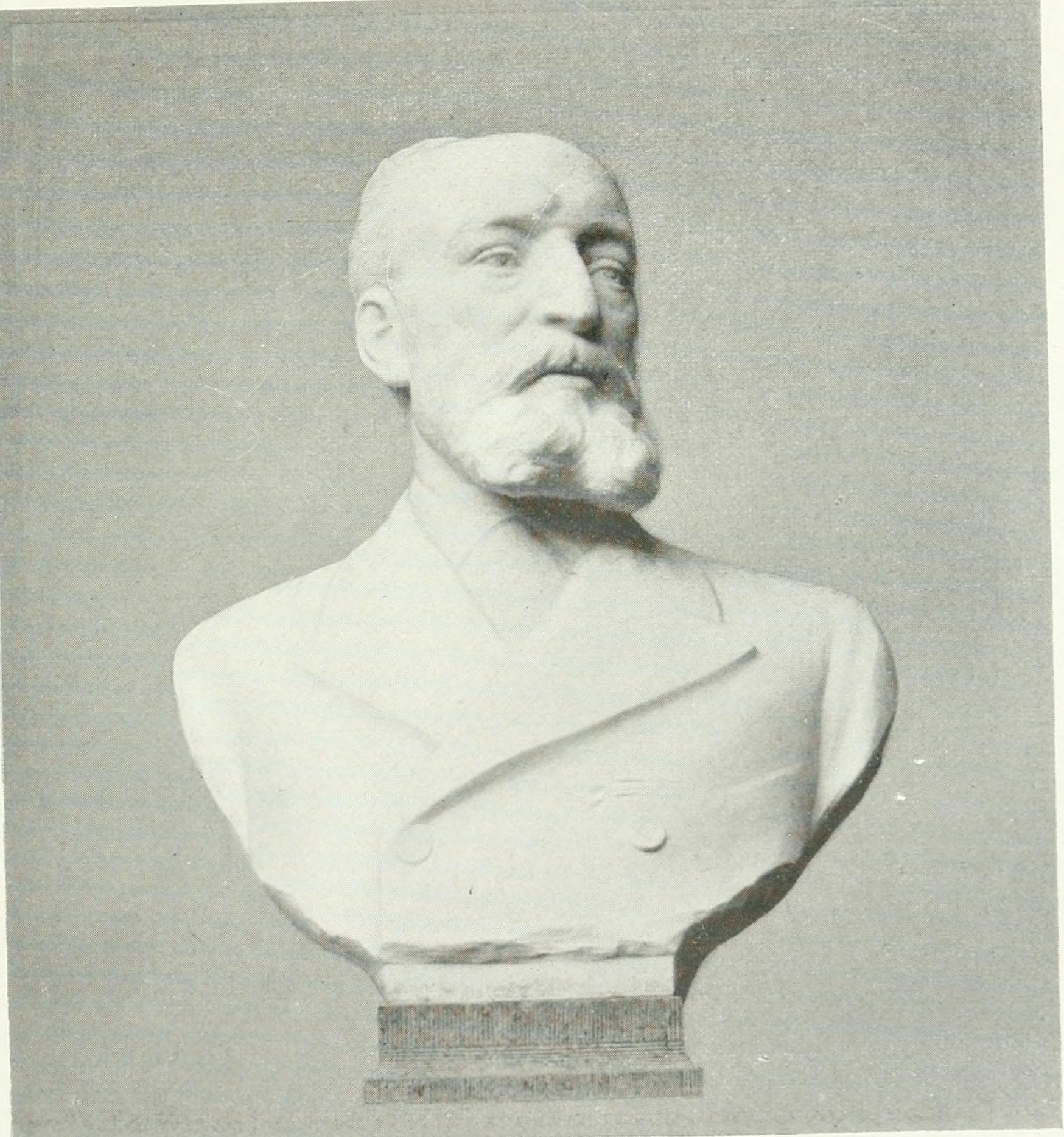

Léon Vanderkindere (22 February 1842 – 9 November 1906) was a Belgian historian, academic and politician.

== Family ==
Vanderkindere was born in Molenbeek-Saint-Jean into a wealthy middle-class family. His father, Albert Vanderkindere, was a politician in the Liberal Party. Albert had been a member of the provincial assembly of the province of Brabant from 1844 to 1850 and from 1854 to his death in 1859, and was mayor of Molenbeek from 1842 to 1848, and then of Uccle, where the family moved, from 1854.

== Career ==
Léon Vanderkindere studied at the Université libre de Bruxelles, where he later became a professor. His doctoral thesis argued that race was the primary basis of culture. He followed this up with a study of the combination of Celtic and Germanic "traits" that he regarded as identifiable in Belgian culture. His later work was primarily made up of more conventional documentary study of medieval institutions and culture.

He was a member of the Royal Academy of Science, Letters and Fine Arts. Like his father he was active in Liberal politics and served as mayor of Uccle from 1900 until his death in 1906. A square and a street in Uccle are named for him.

== Works ==
The works of Vanderkindere included the following.

- Notice sur l'origine des magistrats communaux et sur l'organisation de la marke dans nos contrées au moyen âge (Bulletin de l'Académie) Bruxelles (1874)
- Le siècle des Artevelde: études sur la civilisation morale et politique de la Flandre et du Brabant. Bruxelles (1879)
- L'Université de Bruxelles 1834-1884: Notice historique. Bruxelles, P. Weissenbruch (1884)
- Introduction à l'histoire des institutions de la Belgique au moyen âge. I (périodes celtique, romaine et franque); Bruxelles (1890)
- Les tributaires ou serfs d'église en Belgique au moyen âge. Bruxelles (1897)
- La formation territoriale des principautés belges au Moyen Age, Tome 1, Bruxelles, H. Lamertin (1902)
- La formation territoriale des principautés belges au Moyen Age, Tome 2, Bruxelles, H. Lamertin (1902)
- La première phase de l'évolution constitutionnelle des communes flamandes. In Annales de l'Est et du Nord, Series 2, Volume I (1905), pp. 321–367.
- La politique communale de Philippe d'Alsace et ses conséquences. In: Bulletin de l'Académie (1905).
