= Emmo =

Emmo, a diminutive of a Germanic masculine given name, may refer to:

- Emmo, Count of Hesbaye (d. aft. 982)
- Emmo of Loon (d. 1078), count

== See also ==
- Ehrenfried (name)
- Immo (disambiguation)
