= Ehrenfried =

Ehrenfried is a male given name (with medieval short forms Immon, Emmo, Ezzo, Immed etc). The name may refer to:

- Ehrenfried I (fl. 866–904), count in the Rhineland
- Ehrenfrid, son of Ricfrid (10th century), son of a count in the Low Countries
- Ehrenfried II (d. c. 970), count in the Rhineland
- Ehrenfried or Emmo, Count of Hesbaye (fl. 934-982), count (or counts) in the Low Countries
- Ehrenfried (fl. 999), abbot of Gorze Abbey
- Ehrenfried or Ezzo, Count Palatine (d. 1034), count in the Rhineland
- Emmo of Loon (d. 1078), count in the Low Countries
- Carl-Ehrenfried Carlberg (1889–1962), Swedish gymnast who competed in the 1912 Summer Olympics
- Christian Ehrenfried Weigel (1748– 1831), German scientist and professor of Chemistry
- Ehrenfried Patzel (1914–2004), Ethnic German football player from Czechoslovakia
- Ehrenfried Pfeiffer (1899–1961), German scientist
- Ehrenfried Günther Freiherr von Hünefeld (1892–1929), German aviation pioneer and initiator of the first transatlantic aeroplane flight from East to West
- Ehrenfried Rudolph (born 1935), German cyclist
- Ehrenfried Walther von Tschirnhaus (1651–1708), German mathematician, physicist, physician and philosopher
- Friedrich Wilhelm Ehrenfried Rost (1768–1835), German theologian, philosopher and classical philologist
- Johann Ehrenfried Pohl (1746–1800), German physician and botanist
- Johann Karl Ehrenfried Kegel (1784–1863), German agronomist and explorer of the Kamchatka Peninsula
- Otto Ehrenfried Ehlers (1855–1895), German traveller

Ehrenfried is a surname. Notable people with the surname include:

- Mark Ehrenfried (born 1991), German pianist
