= Ansfried the Elder, Count in Lotharingia =

10th-century European nobleman

Ansfried or Ansfrid, was a 10th-century count (Latin: comes), who held 15 counties in Lotharingia, a former kingdom which contained the Low Countries and Lorraine, and which was coming under the control of the new Holy Roman Empire during his lifetime. He is sometimes referred to as "the elder" in order to distinguish him from his nephew, and apparent heir, Bishop Ansfried of Utrecht, who was also a powerful count until he became a bishop.

Thietmar of Merseburg, describing Ansfried's nephew of the same name, named two paternal uncles, Ansfried and Robert, Bishop of Trier. This implies that Ansfried the elder is brother to Bishop Robert, who was himself described as a relative to the Ottonians, the royal family at the time. It was Thietmar who described Ansfried the elder, the uncle, as a count of 15 counties, and says it was he who sent his nephew to Bruno the great for his education, after he had already spent time with his other uncle.

If Ansfried was the same as the advocatus of the Abbey of Gembloux in the 950s, as is often thought, then he was also described as a blood-relative (consanguineus) of Wicfrid, the founder of that Abbey. He was probably also the rebel who held the fort of Chevremont near Liège in 939, after the Battle of Andernach and the death of Duke Gilbert of Lotharingia.

== Records ==
Some of the records which are used to describe Anfried's life might have been describing someone else named Ansfried, such as his nephew.

Not yet described as a count, a first mention might be in 928, in a grant made by Gilbert, Duke of Lotharingia, involving the church of Saint Servatius in Maastricht. Jongbloed suggested this was Ansfried the elder partly because another junior witness is named Arnold, and the names Arnold and Ansfried appear in later records together.

In 939 a count named Ansfried is described by Widukind of Corvey as one of the leaders of the Lotharingian people. This Ansfried and another Lotharingian leader named Arnold held the fortification of Chevremont near Liège after the Lotharingians lost the Battle of Andernach in 939. They were talked down by their compatriot Count Immo and captured. Widukind wrote that Ansfried was partly convinced by an offer of alliance and marriage with the only daughter of Immo. Jongbloed has argued that this marriage went ahead. However, Karsten has argued that Widukind clearly wanted to give the impression that the offer was made in bad faith. After Ansfried and Arnold were captured, Widukind reports that Immo advised that Ansfried, being as "hard as iron", would need the harshest torments to question him.

In 950, a count Ansfried "fidelis noster" (our faithful) was mentioned by Louis "d'Outremer", king of West Francia ("France"). Louis had married Gerberga, also present, the former wife of his ally Duke Gilbert of Lotharingia who had died at Andernach. Because this count was apparently a vassal of the western king, there are doubts about whether it could be Ansfried, whose homeland of Lotharingia was by this time back under control of the eastern kingdom ("Germany"). However, Jongbloed (2009 p. 32) argues that during this period the western kingdom was a defeated "quasi protectorate", and so being a double vassal would be possible.

Soon after, in a charter of 7 Oct 950, a place called Cassallum, probably Kessel on the left bank of the Maas between Roermond and Venlo, is described as being "in pago Masalant in comitatu Ruodolfi" (in the country of Maasland, in the county of Rudolf), and "cuidam vassallo nostro Ansfrid" (a certain vassal of ours Ansfried) was the beneficiary of the rights to have a market and mint there.

From this time on, there is disagreement about whether there are any more sightings of the elder Ansfried in contemporary records.

According to some historians such as Aarts, Ansfried the elder is mentioned by Sigebert of Gembloux as the advocate (vogt) of the newly founded Gembloux Abbey in the 950s, during the reign of Bishop Balderic I in Liège. Historians who believe this argue that the younger Ansfried would have been too young. Van Winter on the other hand has argued that this record is incorrectly dated, and that these events in Gembloux must have been in the 980s after young Ansfried returned from Italy. There is therefore a similar debate about whether the elder Ansfried is also the son named Ansfried who, in a transaction described by Sigebert, served as a witness to a transaction between a noble named Lambert and the founder of the abbey, who was acting on its behalf, Wicbert of Gembloux (also written Guibert etc.). However, this Ansfried could also have been the younger nephew. There is also debate about whether this Ansfried was the son of Lambert or of Wicbert. In any case, all of these people are likely to be related to each other, and they presumably share descent from Wicbert's grandparents Gisla and Rothing.

When Otto I returned from Italy in early 965, some historians such as Aarts think that the Ansfrid who appears in a high position in a list from Liège must still be the elder Ansfried, and not his nephew who was still young, and who may indeed still have been in Italy.

Later in the 960s are two records of a Count Ansfried with a county in or near the Dutch river delta area, one in Varik in Teisterbant, and one in Toxandria. There is also one more charter which connects an Ansfried to the wife of his late Duke Gilbert, in 968, when he was involved in a charter concerning her allodial rights in the area of Meerssen in the Maasland.

In July 985, one of the Ansfrieds, comes illustris vir, was holding the County of Huy, near Liège, which he granted to the bishop of Liège.

== Notable non-consensus speculations ==
There are two very notable proposals which have not created a lasting consensus, but which are discussed in secondary literature.

1. Vanderkindere (1902), proposed that Ansfried was in fact the same person as Ehrenfrid, son of Ricfrid, and that an otherwise unattested sister of this Ehrenfried married the above-mentioned Lambert, the so-called Count of Louvain. The elder Ansfried, in this explanation, would actually be Bishop Ansfried's maternal uncle, normally avunculus in Latin. This is no longer widely accepted.

2. Jongbloed (2009), proposed that Ansfried the elder married a daughter of Count Immo, based mainly on the story of Widukind mentioned above. He furthermore proposed that this Ansfried was, like his nephew with the same name, a founder of the Abbey of Thorn, though the two have later, according to him, become confused.

== Sources ==
- Aarts, Bas (1994) "Ansfried, graaf en bisschop. Een stand van zaken", in: J. Coolen en J. Forschelen (ed.), Opera Omnia II. Een verzameling geschied- en heemkundige opstellen, 7–85
- Aarts, Bas (2009) "Montferland' en de consequenties. De vroege burchten bij Alpertus van Metz", H.L. Janssen en W. Landewé (ed.), Middeleeuwse Kastelen in veelvoud. Nieuwe Studies over oud erfgoed (Wetenschappelijke Reeks Nederlandse Kastelenstichting 2) pp. 13–59. link
- Aarts, Bas (2016) "Het 'eeuwige Strijen'. Speurtocht naar de gravin, haar schenking en haar familie" in Van den Eynde & Toorians (eds) Op zand, veen en klei: Liber amicorum Karel Leenders bij gelegenheid van zijn zeventigste verjaardag, Hilversum, Verloren
- Bachrach, Berhard S., and Bachrach, David S., (Translators and Editors), Widukind of Corvey’s Deeds of the Saxons, Catholic University Press, Washington, DC, 2014
- Baerten (1961) "Les Ansfrid au Xe siècle" Revue belge de Philologie et d'Histoire 39-4 pp. 1144–1158
- Jongbloed, Hein H., (2006), "Immed “von Kleve” (um 950) – Das erste Klevische Grafenhaus (ca. 885-ca. 1015) als Vorstufe des geldrischen Fürstentums", Annalen des Historischen Vereins für den Niederrhein, Heft 209
- Jongbloed, Hein H., (2009) "Listige Immo en Herswind. Een politieke wildebras in het Maasdal (938-960) en zijn in Thorn rustende dochter", Jaarboek. Limburgs Geschied- en Oudheidkundig Genootschap vol. 145 (2009) pp. 9–67
- Karsten, (2016) Zwischen Glaube und Welt pp.31-36
- Vanderkindere, Léon, La Formation territoriale des principautés belges au Moyen Âge, Bruxelles, H. Lamertin, 1902
- van Winter, (1981) Ansfried en Dirk, twee namen uit de Nederlandse geschiedenis van de 10e en 11e eeuw link

== Primary sources ==
- Alberic of Trois Fontaines MGH SS XXIII, p.756, year 921
- Beyer, Heinrich (ed.) Urkundenbuch zur Geschichte der jetzt die Preussischen Regierungsbezirke Coblenz und Trier bildenden mittelrheinischen Territorien (Vol.1)
- Flodoard Annales. French ed. by Lauer p.157
- Miraeus (Foppens ed.) Opera diplomatica et historica, Vol. I, 2nd ed. p.41
- Diplomata Otto I, MGH DD OI no.82 p.161 year 946
- Diplomata Otto III, MGH DD OIII p.413 year 985
- Oorkonden van Noord-Brabant 690-1312 http://resources.huygens.knaw.nl/retroboeken/obnb/
- Sigebert of Gembloux, Gesta abbatum Gemblacensium can be found in MGH SS VIII p.528, p.529
- Thietmar, Chronicon can be found in MGH SS rer. Germ. NS IX.
- Widukind of Corvey, Res gestae saxonicae sive annalium can be found in MGH SS rer. Germ.
