= Ruotger of Trier =

Ruotger
- Archbishop of Trier
- Church: Catholic Church
- Diocese: Archdiocese of Trier
- In office: 915–931

Personal details
- Died: 27 January 931

Ruotger, also spelled Rutger, Rudger or Rudgar (Note: His name may be modernised and anglicised as Roger.) (died 27 January 931), was the archbishop of Trier from 915. His archdiocese at first lay within the kingdom of West Francia, but after 925 it was annexed to East Francia, an event in which Ruotger played a major role. (Note: East Francia and West Francia evolved into Germany and France respectively.)

== Biography ==
Ruotger was born to a noble family, probably in Lotharingia, possibly from the region north of Metz, around Thionville. He had a brother named Beroald, a layman, who was accused by Eberwin of Tholey a century later of having usurped the abbey of Saint Martin in Trier after the death of Abbot Regino. He also had a wealthy niece in the Rizzigau. Nothing is known of Ruotger's life before his elevation to the archdiocese in 915. His predecessor, Radbod, died on 30 March that year. It is probable that Ruotger was chosen as his successor in a free election by the cathedral chapter, since in 928 the church had been granted that privilege by King Charles the Straightforward. Nonetheless, it is probable that the choice of Ruotger was in conformity with the king's wishes, since Trier was at the time the chief city of Lotharingia, which had only been joined to Charles's kingdom in 911.

As Charles's archchancellor for Lotharingia from January 916, Ruotger had a large role in securing the king's authority in Lotharingia, culminating in the Treaty of Bonn in 921, in which the East Frankish king, Henry the Fowler, recognised Lotharingian as belonging to West Francia. Ruotger also became involved in a conflict with Giselbert, duke of Lotharingia, over the basilica of Saint Servatius in Maastricht.

In June 922, Charles's domestic opponents declared him deposed, electing and crowning Robert, Count of Paris, in his place. Charles was forced to retreat with his supporters into Lotharingia. Ruotger, erstwhile archchancellor, does not appear to have attended Charles's court there, for he is not mentioned in any further royal documents. It may be that he had gone over to Robert, or else that he was already supporting a bid by Henry the Fowler for Lotharingia. In June 923, Robert was killed at the battle of Soissons, but Charles's was defeated and shortly afterwards captured. Henry took the opportunity to invade Lotharingia and besiege Metz. By this time Ruotger had clearly abandoned the king, for he was present with Henry's army at the siege of Metz. Ruotger's support for Henry carried with it that of the Lotharingian church. By 925 the East Frankish annexation was complete, and in 927 Henry appointed Ruotger as his Lotharingian archchancellor.

As a clergyman, Ruotger's primary concern was the renewal of the Lotharingian church in the aftermath of Viking and Hungarian raids, which had taken a physical toll on the churches and disrupted ecclesiastical structures. It was in this context that, in 927×929, Ruotger held a provincial synod attended by the bishops of Metz, Toul and Verdun. It was probably for this occasion that he composed a capitula episcoporum, a manual for ecclesiastical practices and the subdiocesan level. Such instruments were common during the earlier Carolingian epoch, and Ruotger's is the last one from Lotharingia. Only 28 of its chapters survive in later manuscripts: one tenth-century and another twelfth-century manuscript from West Francia, and a twelfth-century East Frankish manuscript. It probably never circulated much beyond the province of Trier, and it owed more to West Frankish exemplars than East Frankish ones. It was partially modeled on the capitula drawn up by Archbishop Radulf of Bourges in 853. Several of its chapters match canons from the provincial synod, but it cannot be determined which came first. The provincial canons, titled Sermo in synodo faciendus as if they were a sermon delivered by Ruotger to his assembled bishops, were only discovered in a Viennese manuscript in the early 1980s.

Ruotger was buried in the chapel dedicated to Saint Walpurga in the church of Sankt Paulin in Trier. His gravestone was still visible in the 17th century.

== Writings ==
- Ruotger (1984). "Capitula des Ruotger von Trier". In P. Brommer (ed.). Capitula episcoporum, 1. Monumenta Germaniae Historica. pp. 61–70.

== Sources ==
- Bauer, Thomas (2005). "Ruotger". Neue Deutsche Biographie. Vol. 22. Berlin: Duncker & Humblot. p. 269.
- Blasen, Michael (1941). "Die Canonessammlung des Erzbischofs Ruotger von Trier vom Jahre 927: Ein Beitrag zur Rechtsgeschichte der Diözese Trier". Pastor Bonus. 52: 61–72.
- Blasen, Michael (1943). Erzbischof Ruotger von Trier (915–930) und seine Bedeutung für die kirchliche Rechtsgeschichte: Mit einer Ausgabe seines Capitulare (PhD thesis). University of Bonn.
- Brommer, Peter (1975). "Die Kanonessammlung Ruotgers von Trier: Quellenuntersuchung und Analyse der Arbeitsweise". Archiv für mittelrheinische Kirchengeschichte. 27: 35–48.
- Brommer, Peter (1978). "Der Brief Erzbischof Ruotgers von Trier an seine Priester". Kurtrierisches Jahrbuch. 8: 28–30.
- Hamilton, Sarah (2001). The Practice of Penance, 900–1050. Woodbridge: Boydell Press.
- Persch, Martin (1994). "Ruotger von Trier". Biographisch-Bibliographisches Kirchenlexikon. Vol. 8. Herzberg am Harz: Verlag Traugott Bautz. pp. 1013–14.
- Wagner, Paul (1890). "Rutger (Ruotger)". Allgemeine Deutsche Biographie. Vol. 30. Leipzig: Duncker & Humblot. pp. 39–41.

Catholic Church titles
Preceded by Radbod	Archbishop of Trier; 915–931	Succeeded by Ruotbert
