= Lambert (nobleman of the Maasgau) =

10th-century Lotharingian nobleman

Lambert (10th century), was a Lotharingian nobleman with lands somewhere near modern Dutch Limburg, who was associated with Gembloux Abbey in French-speaking Belgium. Its founder Wicbert was possibly a relative. Although there are other proposals, he is generally considered to be the father of Bishop Ansfried of Utrecht and he was probably a brother of Ansfried the elder and Robert, the Archbishop of Trier.

Lambert is known from one record, which has survived in two versions. One of these was made much later, in the 16th century, and has been the subject of much published discussion. It involved the church of "Biettine" (believed to be Obbicht) in the Maasgau.

== Interpretations of the evidence ==
Over the centuries, this Lambert has been claimed as a Count of Louvain, and an "Advocate" (Latin advocatus) of the abbey of Gembloux. A number of historical records imply that the family group which he and Wicbert seem to be a part of were related to the Ottonian dysnasty, Robert, Archbishop of Trier, and possibly the House of Reginar.

The record which has survived says that one of the early possessions of the Abbey was half of the church at a place called Wiettine or Biettine in the Maasland district. Erluin, the first abbot of Gembloux, sent the founder Wicbert himself, who had probably originally owned and granted the other half of the church which the abbey already owned. The negotiation succeeded, and possession was handed over to the advocatus of the Abbey, and this was observed by a son named Ansfried. There is debate about whether Ansfried was son of Wicbert or Lambert.

The oldest version is that found in the Gesta abbatum Gemblacensium, by Sigebert of Gembloux. Aubert Miraeus published the early modern version of this text which appears to have clarified, and maybe modified, the meaning, so that Ansfried is definitely the son of Lambert, not Wicbert. His source was a different old document, the Catalogus Abbatum Gembalcensium, which is today lost. That Lambert was count of Louvain is a statement Miraeus does not explain, and which does not appear in any of the citations he makes from old sources, so it is possibly his own conclusion.

Ansfried is normally understood to be either Ansfried the Bishop of Utrecht, who would have been quite young at this time, or Ansfried the elder, his paternal uncle, a count with 15 counties, who may have become an advocatus of Gembloux.

The name of Lambert as a Count of Louvain, is known only from later generations, starting in the eleventh century. This Biettine document is from the tenth century, and historians are suspicious of Mireaus's statement. It is not even clear if there was a county of this name, at this time. Count Lambert I of Louvain and his brother Reginar IV were exiled around 958 and began attempting to return to Lotharingia in 973 claiming some of the places their family had once held.

On the other hand, the version of Miraeus has generally been accepted concerning the fact that his text makes Ansfried the son of Lambert. More recently Jongbloed (2009) has controversially proposed that Ansfried can confidently be described as the son of Wicbert, though authors such as Karsten and Aarts think that the reading of Miraeus might still be justifiable if the text of the Gesta itself already contained an error. The reason for proposing that a faulty text is likely, is to explain what the role of Ansfried was as an observer. Typically in medieval contracts, heirs appear as witnesses, when a family is giving away something they might otherwise have inherited, in order to avoid future disputes. In this case, the man selling was clearly Lambert.

Miraeus also claimed that Lambert was the son of Ragineri I et Alberadæ, frater Ragineri II Longicolli, Hannoniæ comitis [son of Reginar I and Alberade, and brother of Reginar II, Count of Hainaut, Longneck],. However, there are no primary sources to support this statement. In his influential work of 1902, Vanderkindere made a proposal that Lambert married an unattested daughter of Ricfried, Count of Betuwe, and they were the parents of the younger Ansfried, the witness (who was however too young to be advocatus), who would later become Bishop of Utrecht. This proposed marriage was speculative, and has gained no general acceptance among historians.

Thietmar of Merseburg refers to the "paternal uncle [of Bishop Ansfrid, possibly Lambert’s son], Robert, Archbishop of Trier”, implying a sibling relationship between Lambert and Robert, if Lambert (not Wicbert) was Bishop Ansfrid's father, and not the elder Ansfried's.

== Sources ==
- Aarts, Bas (1994) "Ansfried, graaf en bisschop. Een stand van zaken", in: J. Coolen en J. Forschelen (ed.), Opera Omnia II. Een verzameling geschied- en heemkundige opstellen, 7-85
- Aarts, Bas (2009) "Montferland' en de consequenties. De vroege burchten bij Alpertus van Metz", H.L. Janssen en W. Landewé (ed.), Middeleeuwse Kastelen in veelvoud. Nieuwe Studies over oud erfgoed (Wetenschappelijke Reeks Nederlandse Kastelenstichting 2) pp. 13–59. link
- Aarts, Bas (2016) "Het 'eeuwige Strijen'. Speurtocht naar de gravin, haar schenking en haar familie" in Van den Eynde & Toorians (eds) Op zand, veen en klei: Liber amicorum Karel Leenders bij gelegenheid van zijn zeventigste verjaardag, Hilversum, Verloren
- Baerten (1961) "Les Ansfrid au Xe siècle" Revue belge de Philologie et d'Histoire 39-4 pp. 1144–1158
- Jongbloed, Hein H.. (2009) "Listige Immo en Herswind. Een politieke wildebras in het Maasdal (938-960) en zijn in Thorn rustende dochter", Jaarboek. Limburgs Geschied- en Oudheidkundig Genootschap vol. 145 (2009) pp. 9–67
- Karsten, (2016) Zwischen Glaube und Welt pp.31-36
- Vanderkindere, Léon, La Formation territoriale des principautés belges au Moyen Âge, Bruxelles, H. Lamertin, 1902
- van Winter, (1981) Ansfried en Dirk, twee namen uit de Nederlandse geschiedenis van de 10e en 11e eeuw link
- Warner, David A., Ottonian Germany. The Chronicon of Thietmar of Merseburg. Manchester, 2001.
- Weigle, Fritz, Balderich, Neue Deutsche Biographie, Berlin: Duncker & Humblot, 1953

== Primary sources ==
- Gesta abbatum Gemblacensium can be found in MGH SS VIII p.528
- Miraeus (Foppens ed.) Opera diplomatica et historica, Vol. I, 2nd ed. p.41
