= Ricfried, Count of Betuwe =

Ricfried was a 9th and 10th century count in Betuwe (Batavia) now in the Netherlands. His areas of influence possibly stretched into parts of the Rhineland, which is now in Germany.

Historians sometimes refer to his family as the "Balderics" because both his son and grandson were bishops named Balderic.

Partly for this reason it has been proposed by historians such as Leon Vanderkindere that he may be an ancestor of the Counts of Loon (Looz) in modern Belgian Limburg, because this family also included a bishop named Balderic.

== Life ==
What we know of Ricfried derives mainly from two records, along with several which mention him as the father of Bishop Balderic.

Firstly, the memorial of he and his wife says that Ricfried had driven away pagans. It also names his children as presul Baldricus … preses Rodolphus … victor [or "rector"] Yrimfredus pariterque comes Nevelongus (prelate Balderic, governor Rodulph, victor/rector Yrimfred and count Nevelung). The memorial also mentions that was also known as Count Dodo, his memorial calling him "Ricfridus hoc nomine Dodo vocatus … comes".

Secondly, under the name Count Dodo he was mentioned in an 897 charter by Zwentibold, King of Lotharingia, as a count who held comital office which included at least part of Herwen in Batavia.

Thirdly, the 10th century of Bishop Balderic's predecessor Radboud of Utrecht says that Balderic, "the son of Count Ricfried", used to visit Bishop Radboud, who saw him as an outstanding young man who would become bishop himself one day.

Furthermore, the necrologium of Egmond in Utrecht says the father of Bishop Balderic of Utrecht was a count of Cleves (comes clivensis) and the necrologium of the Plechelmus basilica in Oldenzaal, founded by Balderic, calls Balderic himself "Balderic of Cleves" (de clivis). Jongbloed argues that although the style of the title seems to be from a later generation, it should not be ignored.

=== Family ===
Ricfried married Herensinda, from an unknown family. Four sons are known from the monument, and a daughter has been proposed:

- Balderic, Bishop of Utrecht.
- "Victor" (or in an alternative transcription "Rector") Iremfrid (died after 966). Apparently known for military prowess at his father's death, but not called a count. Jongbloed (2016) argued that he must have taken over Nevelung's inheritance.
- "Preses" Rudolfe. Leon Vanderkindere proposed that he was Bishop of Laon. Jongbloed (2016) argued that the grave record shows he was a count, with a wife and offspring. Aarts (1994) thinks praeses refers to the military "prefecture" known in this area which had historically suffered from Viking raids.
- Count Nevelung (died before 943). According to Jongbloed, Ricfried was initially succeeded by his son Nevelung as Count of Betuwe upon his death. However he had also died by 943. Jongbloed (2016) suggests he was part of the Regnarid rebellion which ended with the Battle of Andernach.
- An otherwise unknown daughter was proposed by Vanderkindere to have married Lambert. However this was part of a complex scenario which is no longer widely accepted.

== Also see ==
- Aarts, Bas (1994) "Ansfried, graaf en bisschop. Een stand van zaken", in: J. Coolen en J. Forschelen (ed.), Opera Omnia II. Een verzameling geschied- en heemkundige opstellen, 7-85
- Vanderkindere, L. (1900) ‘A propos d´une charte de Baldéric d’Utrecht’, Académie royale de Belgique Bulletin de la Classe des Lettres et des Sciences Morales et Politiques (Bruxelles),
- Weigle, Fritz, Balderich, Neue Deutsche Biographie, Berlin: Duncker & Humblot, 1953
- Jongbloed, Hein H., (2009) "Listige Immo en Herswind. Een politieke wildebras in het Maasdal (938-960) en zijn in Thorn rustende dochter", Jaarboek. Limburgs Geschied- en Oudheidkundig Genootschap vol. 145 (2009) p. 9-67
- Vanderkindere, Léon, La Formation territoriale des principautés belges au Moyen Âge, Bruxelles, H. Lamertin, 1902
- Warner, David A., Ottonian Germany. The Chronicon of Thietmar of Merseburg. Manchester, 2001
