= Robert (archbishop of Trier) =

Archbishop, politician, patron and reformer (died 956)

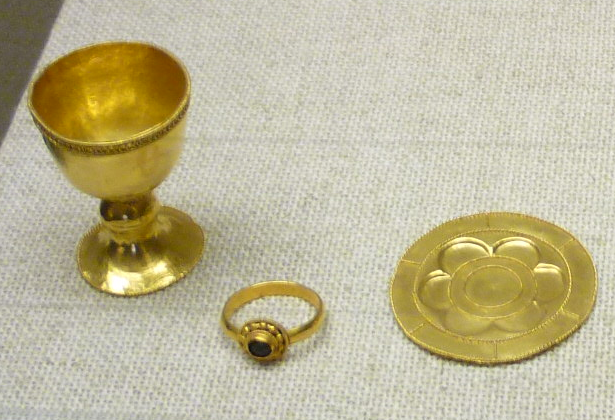
Robert's chalice, ring and paten on display in the cathedral of Trier

Robert, also spelled Ruotbert or Rotbert (died 19 May 956), was the archbishop of Trier from 931 until his death. He played a leading role in the politics of both Germany and France, and especially of the Lotharingian territory in between. He was a patron of scholars and writers and a reformer of monasteries.

== Rise ==
If Robert was the canonical age of thirty when elected bishop, he would have been born in 901 or earlier. This is most likely, since he was already the chancellor of the see of Trier under his predecessor, Rudgar. (In 938 he granted a lifetime precaria to his predecessor's niece, Ada, and her two sons.) Robert was originally from the Batavian region, perhaps a member of the Saxon nobility. His brother, Ansfried the elder, was said to have been the count of fifteen counties, including Toxandria, and his nephew's daughter was said to be related to the Unrochinger family. Robert was described by some records as a kinsman of Bruno the Great, a member of the Ottonian royal family. Alberic of Trois Fontaines wrote that Robert was even a brother of Queen Mathilda, wife of King Henry I of Germany and mother of Bruno, However, this is no longer considered possible. According to the Chronicle of Bishop Thietmar of Merseburg, Robert personally educated his nephew who would one day be Bishop of Utrecht, Ansfried the younger, in law and theology. Another possible brother sometimes proposed is Lambert (nobleman of the Maasgau), the proposed father of his nephew the younger Ansfried.

Robert's predecessaro, Rudgar, died on 27 January 931 and Robert became archbishop probably towards the end of the year. He owed his elevation to the influence of King Henry, and shortly afterwards was appointed archchancellor of Lotharingia, a post also held by Rudgar. On 1 June 932, jointly with Archbishops Unni of Hamburg and Hildebert of Mainz, he presided over the synod of Erfurt, a synod of all the bishops of Germany outside of Bavaria. This synod decided to stop paying tribute to Hungary. On 7 August 936, Robert and Archbishops Wigfried of Cologne and Hildebert of Mainz jointly crowned and consecrated Henry's successor, Otto I, in the palatine chapel at Aachen.

== Lotharingian affairs ==
Robert continued in the favour of the new king. He is attested as archchancellor in Lotharingia from 937 to 953 and he served one term as the archchaplain of Otto's court. As archchancellor he frequently acted as an intervenor with the king on behalf of Lotharingian petitioners.

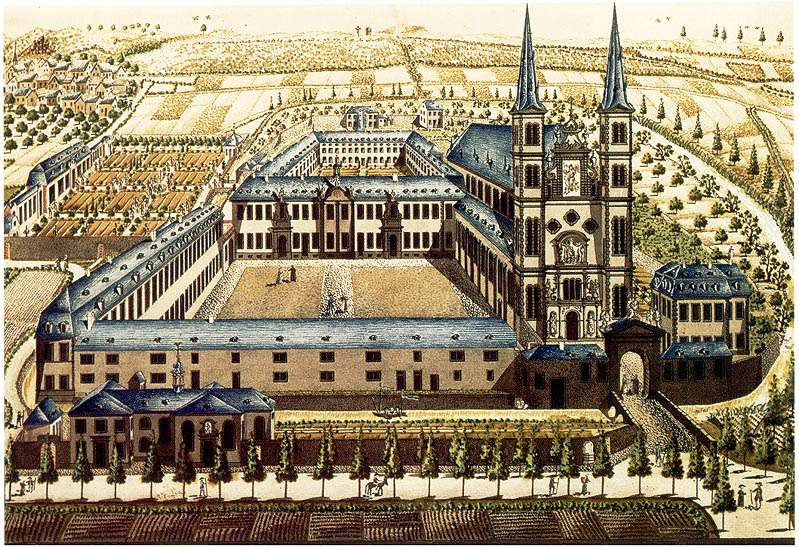
Saint-Maximin in the 18th century

Robert's influence in Lotharingian brought him into conflict with Duke Conrad the Red, who in May 944 at an assembly in Duisburg accused him of disloyalty (infidelitas) to the king. Conrad tried by violence to seize the abbey of Saint-Maximin in Trier, the lay abbacy of which had only been renounced by Conrad's predecessor, Duke Giselbert, in 934, and where the king's brother, Bruno, was being educated under Israel the Grammarian. The newly built church of Saint-Maximin had only been consecrated by Robert on 13 October 942. In 950, Pope Agapetus II confirmed Robert's possession of Saint-Maximin.

In 946 Robert obtained from the king a confirmation of his archdiocese's control of the basilica of Saint Servatius in Maastricht, one of the four largest and richest abbeys in Lotharingia. This settled in the diocese's favour a longstanding dispute. In June 949 he attended an assembly of the leading men of Lotharingia at Nijmegen in the presence of King Otto. In 953, Conrad rebelled and was deposed. The king confirmed Robert's rights in Saint-Maximin on 20 August. At the same time, the archbishopric of Cologne fell vacant and Otto elevated his brother Bruno to both the archbishopric and the duchy of Lotharingia simultaneously in September 953. Otto also removed the Lotharingian chancellery from Robert and bestowed it on Bruno. Nonetheless, Robert attended the consecration of Bruno and also that of Bishop Rather of Liège that year. In the spring of 955, however, he conspired with Count Reginar III of Hainaut to have Rather, a protégé of Bruno's, deposed and exiled—without himself ever entering into open rebellion.

== Reims controversy ==
In 946, Robert became embroiled in a controversy over the archdiocese of Reims. He was possibly motivated by a desire to increase his prestige in Germany. Although he was considered the senior archbishop in 936, he was forced to crown Otto jointly with his counterparts of Mainz and Cologne, and Archbishop Frederick of Mainz had recently been confirmed as the apostolic vicar in the German kingdom by the pope. In 931, King Ralph of France deposed the uncanonically elected Archbishop Hugh and imposed his own candidate, Artold. In 940, Hugh returned and forced Artold into exile. The historian Flodoard was a close associate of Artold and accompanied him into exile, four weeks of which were spent at Trier. In 946, with the military support of King Otto I of Germany and King Louis IV of France, Artold returned to Reims and was formally re-enthroned by Archbishop Robert and Archbishop Frederick of Mainz. Hugh did not submit, and a series of synods were held under the presidency of the archbishop of Trier to settle the matter.

The first met at Verdun in November 947. In attendance were, besides Robert and Artold, bishops Odalric of Aachen, Adalbero I of Metz, Goslenus of Toul and Hildebald of Münster, and abbots Bruno of Lorsch, Agenoldus of Gorze and Odilo of Stavelot. The scholar Israel the Grammarian also attended. Hugh was summoned, but did not appear. The synod confirmed Artold as the legitimate archbishop of Reims and adjourned, scheduling another synod for 13 January 948.

The second synod was held, as scheduled, "in the church of Saint Peter, within sight of the castrum of Mouzon". All the bishops of the province of Trier attended along with some bishops from the province of Reims. Hugh arrived and spoke with Robert in the church but did not attend the sessions. Robert allowed a letter Hugh presented, from Pope Agapetus II, to be read out loud. In it the pope ordered Hugh to be restored, but the bishops refused to heed the command, citing as their reason that the pope had previously mandated Robert of Trier and Frederick of Mainz to resolve the matter canonically and that his latest letter was drawn up at the behest of Hugh's messengers. They confirmed in a charter that Artold was the canonical bishop of Reims, but Hugh still refused to submit.

In light of the failure of the Verdun and Mouzon synods to resolve the matter, Pope Agapetus dispatched a legate, Marinus, to Germany ordering King Otto to call a general synod. On 7 June 948 this synod opened under the presidency of Robert in the chapel dedicated to Saint Remigius in the royal palace at Ingelheim. The kings of Germany and France were both in attendance, as were 32 German bishops, plus Artold and Bishop Ralph II of Laon. Robert opened the synod with a statement of the "public matters of Gaul" (Galliae rem publicam). He later urged that reason be used to persuade Hugh to submit, and if that failed that he be excommunicated.

When Hugh refused to submit, King Otto ordered Duke Conrad and Archbishop Robert to gather a large army, enter France and force his surrender. The army of Trier, augmented by the forces of bishops of Laon and Metz, took four weeks to assemble. The mere approach of this army forced the commander of the castle at Mouzon, where Hugh was holed up, to surrender. Hostages were taken, but Hugh was not imprisoned. The castle was razed. Robert then led the army to join up with that of Conrad and besiege the fortress of Montaigu, which had been constructed by Theobald, count of Tours, in rebellion against King Louis. It was quickly captured, and the army moved on to Laon, where Theobald was staying. There, in the abbey of Saint-Vincent, they excommunicated Theobald.

After the successful summer campaign in France, Robert held a provincial synod at Trier in September 948. No Lotharingian or German bishops attended, only Artold of Reims, Ralph of Laon, Guy I of Soissons and Wicfred of Thérouanne. Bishop Transmarus of Noyon sent a messenger to explain his absence due to illness. The legate Marinus was present. Through the formal intercession of Robert and Artold, Marinus absolved Guy of Soissons for having previously backed Hugh. On 8 September the synod excommunicated Duke Hugh the Great, one of Archbishop Hugh's supporters and a thorn in the side of Louis IV.

== Pastor and patron ==
Robert was a careful administrator of his diocese. He pushed forward with the reformation of monasteries, many of which were still at that time under lay ownership and some of which, like Saint-Maximin in Trier and Mettlach in the Saar, had suffered Viking and Hungarian raids. He reorganized the ecclesiastical structures of his diocese down to the level of the parish, especially in the northern Eifel region. He rebuilt the southern church of the cathedral district, today the Liebfrauenkirche, which he consecrated on 9 September 955. He also erected an altar over the tomb of his sixth-century predecessor, Magneric, in the abbey of Saint-Martin in Trier. His contemporary, Bishop Berengar of Verdun, depicts him as one of the inspiring reformers of Lotharingia.

In 951, Robert accompanied Otto on his Italian expedition. From Italy he brought back some relics of Saint Severus of Ravenna in February 952.

Robert was a scholar and a patron of scholars. Before his relationship with Rather of Liège soured, they had a correspondence, wherein Rather credits Robert with an interest in the ancient Greeks and Romans and Robert in turn sent him some of his own writings. Israel the Grammarian obtained Robert's patronage by dedicating his De arte metrica to him. He went on to live as a monk at Saint-Maximin. Flodoard dedicated his Historia Remensis Ecclesiae (History of the Church of Reims) to "the venerable lord and delectable illustrious prelate, R., beloved in Christ" (Domino venerabili et in Christi karitate admodum diligibili preclaro presuli R), almost certainly the archbishop of Trier. While Flodoard goes on to say that Robert "commanded" him to write his history, it is more likely that Robert merely encouraged him. Flodoard also dedicated his poetic trilogy De triumphis Christi (The Triumph of Christ) to Robert.

Robert died while attending a Hoftag in Cologne, during an epidemic of plague. His body was brought back to Trier. Older authorities place his burial in Saint-Paulinus, but he was interred in his own Liebfrauenkirche, where his tomb was discovered in 1950.

Catholic Church titles
Preceded by Rudgar	Archbishop of Trier; 931–956	Succeeded by Henry I
