= Teisterbant =

9th-11th century province of Lotharingia/Middle Francia

- County of Middle Francia
- 843–1026
- Government
  - Type: County
- Count
  - 889-987: Gerolf of Holland
  - ?-995: Ansfried van Huy
  - 1017-1018: Balderic of Utrecht
  - 1026-?: Adalbold II of Utrecht (last)
- Historical era: Middle Ages
  - Treaty of Verdun: 843
  - Incorporation into the Episcopal principality of Utrecht: 1026
Succeeded by
Episcopal principality of Utrecht
Guelders
Duchy of Cleves
Land van Altena
County of Buren
- Today part of: Gelderland, Netherlands

Teisterbant was a pagus (province) of Lotharingia/Middle Francia. It was located in the present-day Netherlands, bordered by the rivers Lek and Waal. Modern-day West-Betuwe (the southern part of the province of Gelderland) shares most of the same land including towns such as Batenburg, Vianen, Tiel, Culemborg, Geldermalsen. The historic fiefdoms of Altena, Arkel, Buren, Heusden and Vianen were also part of it.

== History ==
The name Teisterbant probably comes from Celtic, meaning 'right' (compare teister with the Latin dexter, which means 'right'). This makes it the counterpart of Swifterbant, 'located on the left'. In the 8th century, it was a well-known area. From 843 (after the Treaty of Verdun) to the death of Lothair II in 869, Teisterbant was ruled by Middle Francia. In 870, following the Treaty of Meerssen, Teisterbant came to Lothair's uncle Louis the German and became part of East Francia.

After expelling the Normans by the East Frankish king Arnulf of Carinthia on August 4, 889, Count Gerolf of Holland was given full ownership of a number of lands and properties. He was given several farms and houses in Tiel, Aalborg, and Asch, among others. He was also granted additional property in his own county, consisting of a forest and agricultural lands, situated somewhere between the mouth of the Old Rhine and (presumably) Bennebroek. Gerolf had two sons, Waldger and Dirk. Dirk's descendants became the counts of Holland. Waldger was count of Teisterbant from 898 to 928. He was succeeded by his son Radboud, possibly also called "Poppo".

At the end of the 10th century the area came into the possession of Count Ansfried of Huy. Around 985 he gave up his belongings to live in a monastery. In 994 he was elected bishop of Utrecht. On April 11, 999, Holy Roman Emperor Otto III was given the royal property that "Poppo, son of Wedigeri" in Teisterbant had borrowed from the church of Utrecht. The title count of Teisterbant went to Ansfried's cousin Unruoch (Hunerik), possibly father of Herman van Malsen, ancestor of the lords of Cuijk.

In 1026 Adalbold II acquired the title of count of Teisterbant. The diocese had already acquired several lands, which formed the basis for the Episcopal principality of Utrecht. Parts were issued in loan to the counties of Cleves and Guelders, as well as several honors. Eventually, Teisterbant lost its sovereignty to the diocese, and Teisterbant disappeared from the map.

Later, the area became a zone of contention between the dukes of Brabant and Gelre, because of its strategic location.

== Things named after Teisterbant ==
- There is a fortified house holding the name Teisterbant in the village Kerk-Avezaath, located in the Betuwe. The local football association in this village is called the "v.v. Teisterbanders", and there is a Teisterbant Street (Teisterbantstraat).
- In the Maasdrielse Kerkdriel on the Teisterbantstraat, "House Teisterbant" (Huis Teisterbant) was built on the remains of the outhouse of Count Ansfried van Teisterbant. This noble castle is a large rectangular house. In 1399 the house was mentioned in sources as the 'Huys to Driel'. Many generations of the Van Driel family of the Dukes of Gelre lived here. Only later did it get its current name.
- The Teisterbant club, founded by Godfried Bomans, was named for the pseudonym "Count of Teisterbant" (graaf van Teisterbant), used by author Willem Bilderdijk.
