= Immo =

Immo may refer to:

- 2373 Immo, a main-belt asteroid
- Immo (bishop of Noyon), Frankish prelate killed by Vikings in 859
- Immo (count palatine) (died c. 977)
- Immo (bishop of Arezzo) (died c. 1050)
- Immobiliser

== See also ==
- Emmo (disambiguation)
