= Ratbod (archbishop of Trier) =

Roman Catholic archbishop

- Archbishop of Trier
- Church: Catholic Church
- Diocese: Electorate of Trier
- In office: 883–915

Personal details
- Died: 915

Radbod (or Ratbod) (died 915) was the Archbishop of Trier from 883 until his death. Under the last Carolingians he obtained a great deal of benefits and converted the archdiocese of Trier into one of the most powerful institutions in Germany.

In 898, Radbod received complete immunity from all taxes for the entire episcopal territory from Zwentibold. He obtained from Louis the Child the district and city of Trier, as well as the right to have a mint and impose customs duties. From Charles the Simple he gained the right of free election for his diocese of Trier. In this way the secular possessions of the bishops of Trier, which had sprung from the valuable donations of the Merovingian, were raised to a secular principality.

== Sources ==
- Bernhardt, John W. Itinerant Kingship and Royal Monasteries in Early Medieval Germany, c. 936–1075. Cambridge: Cambridge University Press, 1993.

Preceded by Bertulf	Archbishop of Trier; 883–915	Succeeded by Rudgar
