= Heiligenberg (Leusden) =

Coordinates: 52°8′20″N 5°24′30″E

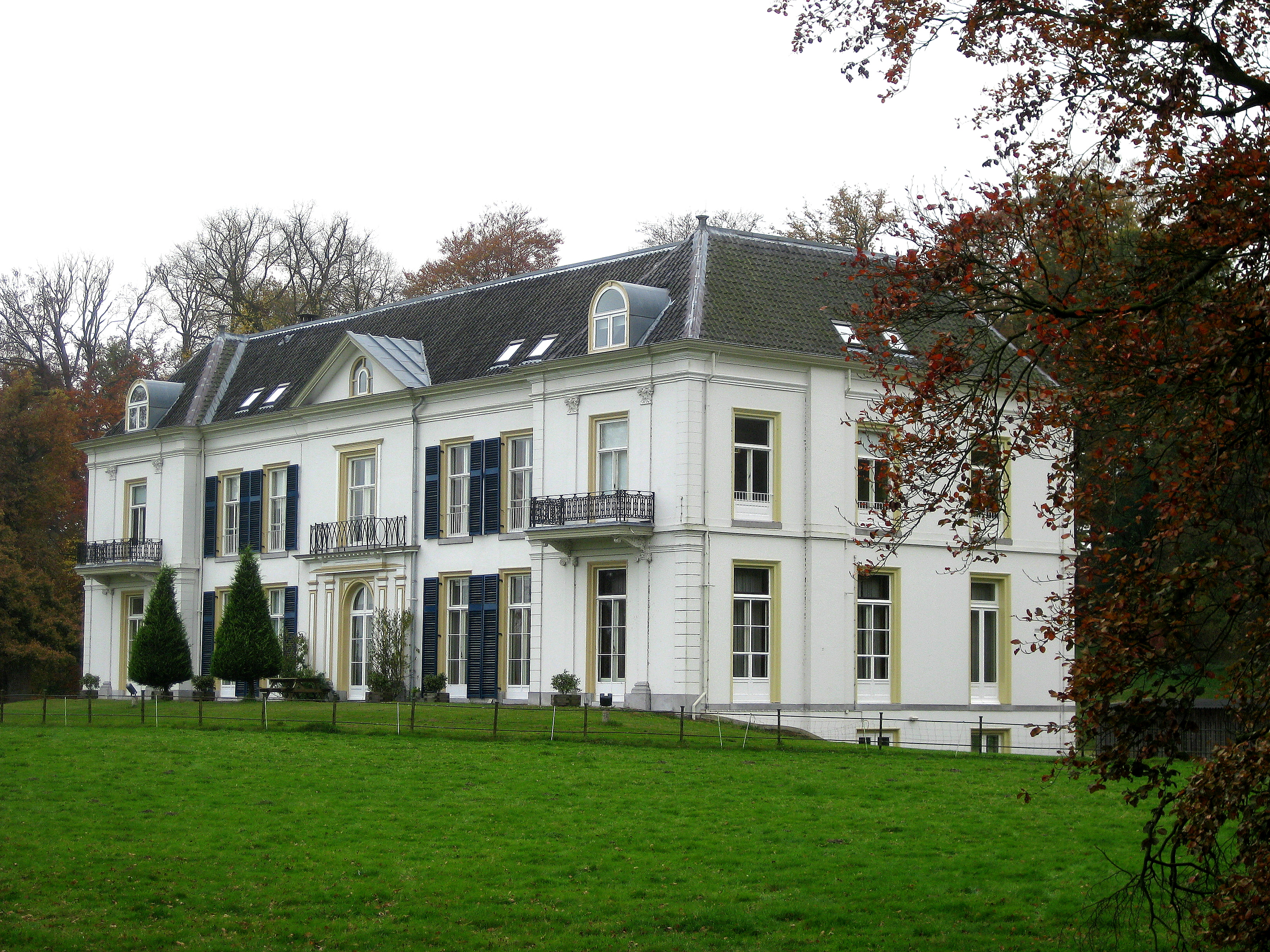
Heiligenberg Mansion

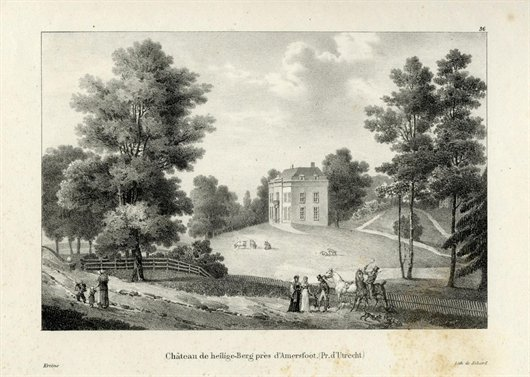
Heiligenberg, ca. 1830.

The Heiligenberg is an estate near the Dutch town of Leusden.

== History ==
The estate is located on a 12-metre (39 ft) high hill, the "Heiligenberg" (Holy Mountain), which dates from the last ice age, about 10,000 years ago. On this hill, then known as Hohorst, bishop Ansfridus of Utrecht founded a small abbey around the year 1000. The abbey was moved to the city of Utrecht around 1030, as St. Paul's Abbey, but the Heiligenberg remained in the monks possession until 1592.

Between the years 1000 and 1586, the Heiligenberg was inhabited by monks. After almost six centuries, the last monks were expelled and the chapel was demolished. After the Reformation, the States of Utrecht took over ownership and management and appointed a steward.

In 1637, the house became an estate and at the later 17th century it belonged to Jacob de Petersen. It was torn down in 1843, after which the currently existing building was erected.
