= Ansfried of Utrecht =

Lotharingian bishop and courtier (died 1010)

Ansfried
- Bishop of Utrecht
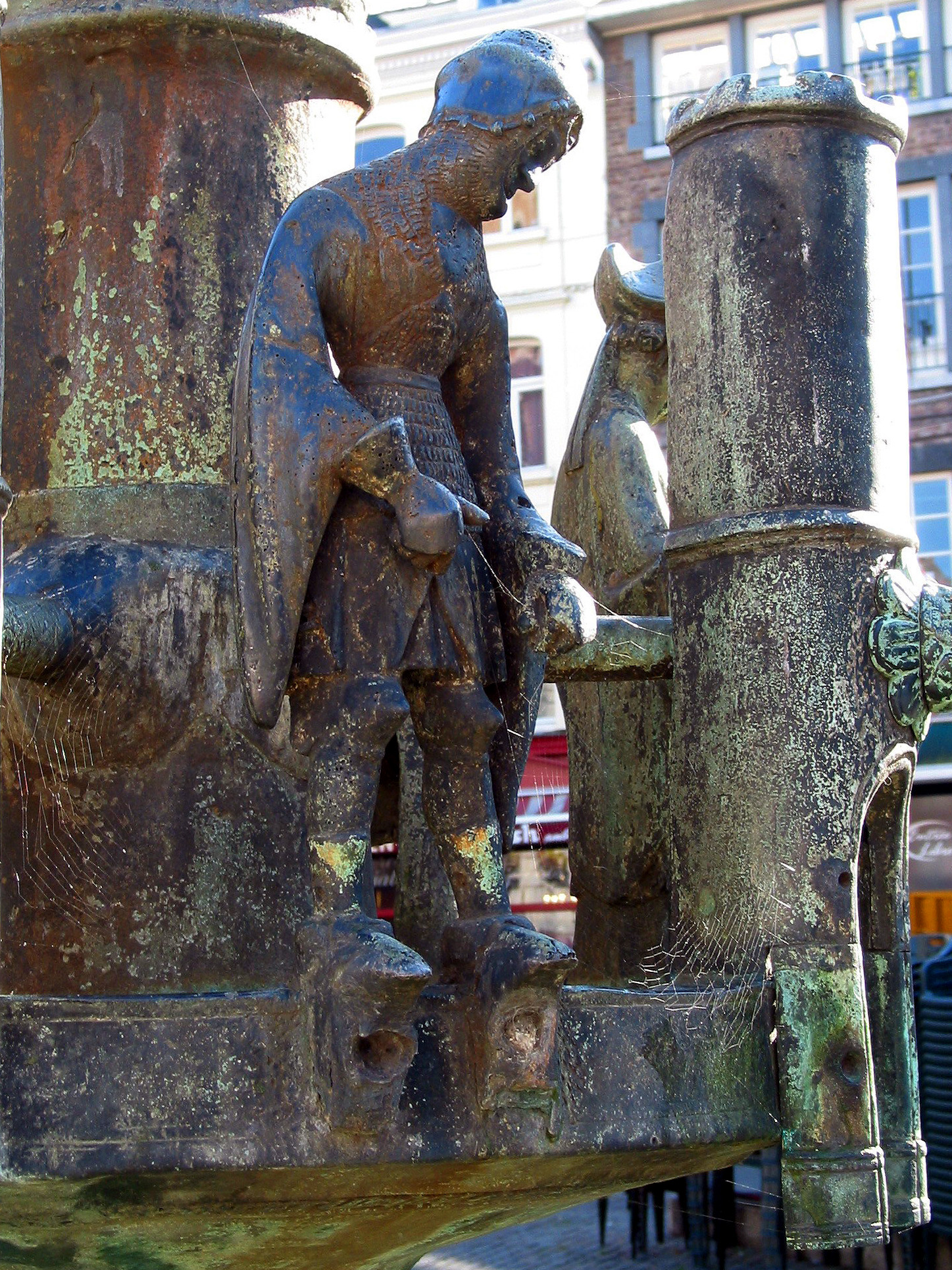
- St. Ansfridus. Small fine bronze of the fountain "Li bassinia" (Huy).
- Church: Catholic Church, Eastern Orthodox Church
- Diocese: Archdiocese of Utrecht
- In office: 995–1010

Personal details
- Died: 3 May 1010

Saint Ansfried (or Ansfrid or Ansfridus) of Utrecht sometimes called Ansfried the younger (died 3 May 1010 near Leusden) was Count of Huy and the sword-bearer for Otto I, Holy Roman Emperor. He became Bishop of Utrecht in 995. He appears to have been the son or grandson of Lambert, a nobleman of the Maasgau, the area where he later founded the Abbey of Thorn. He also appears to have been related to various important contemporaries including the Ottonian royal family.

== Life ==
The principal source of information regarding Ansfried is the De diversitatem temporum by the Benedictine Alpert of Metz, written around 1022.

Ansfried had the same name as a paternal uncle (patruus), Ansfried the elder, a count who supposedly held 15 counties. The young Ansfried studied secular and clerical subjects under another paternal uncle, Robert, Archbishop of Trier, before attending the cathedral school at Cologne.

In 961, Otto I took Ansfried into his personal service and made him his swordbearer. When Otto was in Rome the following year to be crowned Holy Roman Emperor, he directed Ansfried to keep close at hand with the sword as a precaution against any unforeseen eventualities. Karl Leyser describes this as a valuable lesson in practicality.

Because of his Christian commitment, he was highly respected and an important knight of the emperor's circle, holding rich possessions along the Meuse, in Brabant and Gelderland. Possibly all or some of his counties were inherited from his paternal uncle of the same name. As count he had considerable success in suppressing piracy and armed robbery. In 985, Otto III granted Ansfried the right to mint coins at Medemblik, on the north-south shipping route through the Vlie, as well as the income from tolls and tax collecting.

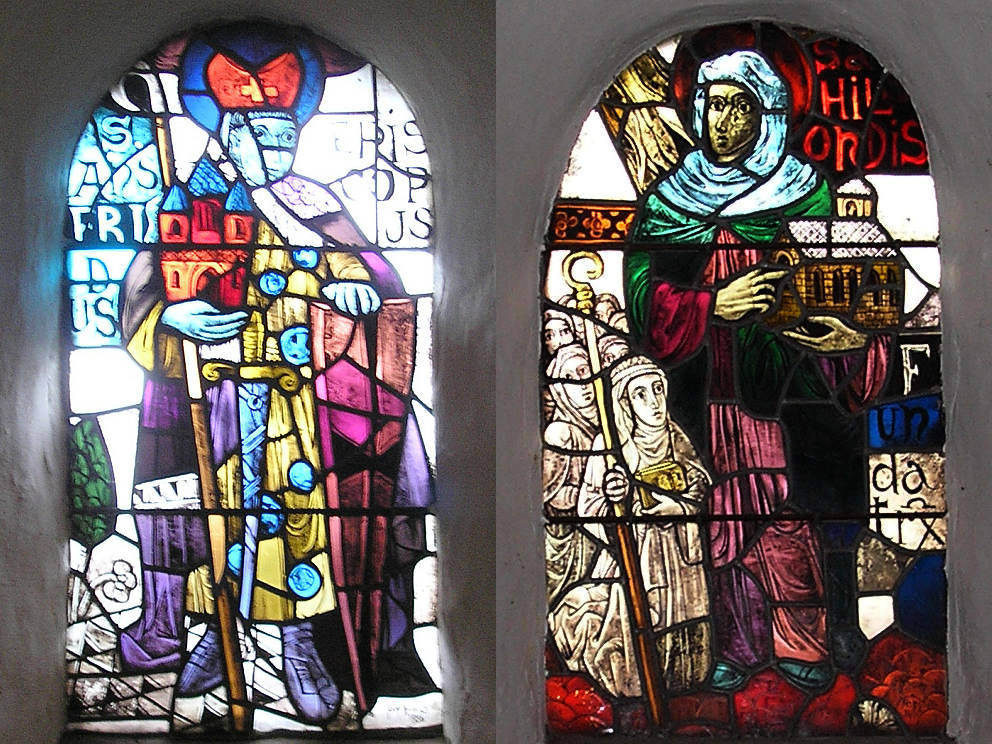
Ansfridus and Hilsondis. Stained glass windows in the abbey of Thorn, 1956.

He was married to Heresuint or Hilsondis. They had one child, Benedicta. He founded a Romanesque abbey church on his wife's estate at Thorn under the patronage of St. Michael. The abbey itself had a double cloister that housed both men and women. Ansfried planned it as a place of retirement for himself and his family after he left public service. Under his control, the abbey and lands, of about 1.5 square kilometers, was reichsunmittel, making it subject only to the Emperor. Hereswitha was to be the first abbess but died on her way there; and Benedicta took her place.

After his wife's death, Ansfried wanted to become a monk. However, in 995, Emperor Otto III and Bishop Notker of Liège persuaded the reluctant Ansfried to assume the then vacant see of Utrecht. Ansfried objected that as he had borne weapons as a knight, he was unworthy of the office, but the emperor prevailed. The elderly count laid down his sword on the altar of Saint Mary in Aachen and was ordained priest and consecrated eighteenth Bishop of Utrecht in the same ceremony. Bishop Ansfried never took a commission in the royal army, in contrast to Notger and the Bishop of Cologne.

In 1006 Bishop Ansfried founded the abbey of Heiligenberg, also under the patronage of Saint Michael. Toward the end of his life he became increasingly weakened through fasting, and retired there as a monk, caring for the sick, although almost blind himself.

Upon his death, townsfolk from Heiligenberg took possession of his body, while the people of Utrecht were extinguishing a not coincidental fire. The abbess of Thorn mediated and Ansfried was buried in the Cathedral of Saint Martin in Utrecht.

== Veneration ==
His feast day was 3 May but was later moved to 11 May.

=== Patronage ===
St. Ansfried is the patron saint of Amersfoort.

=== Iconography ===
Ansfried is portrayed holding a small church building (as a founder); as a knight with weapons at his feet, because he renounced the knighthood; with a bishop's miter and staff; or as a Benedictine monk.

The stained glass windows in St. John's Cathedral in Den Bosch depicting the seven sacraments. The sacrament of Holy Orders portrays St. Ansfried.

== Notes ==
Catholic Church titles
Preceded by Baldwin I (bishop)	Bishop of Utrecht; 995–1010	Succeeded by Adalbold II of Utrecht
