= Iremfrid, son of Ricfrid =

10th-century noble in the Rhine–Meuse delta region

Iremfrid (or Ehrenfried etc. a name which could be shortened to Immo, Emmo, Immed etc.) was a 10th-century noble born to a family which had its power base in the Rhine–Meuse delta region, near the modern border of the Netherlands and Germany. He was the eldest son of Ricfrid Count of Batavia, and his wife Herensinda. The memorial of Ricfried, which now only exists in several transcriptions, referred to him as either "Rector Yrimfredus" or "Victor Yrimfredus".

There are various disputed identifications of this Ehrenfried connecting to records of nobles in the Rhineland region with the same name, most importantly Erenfried II of the "Ezzonid" family, who were established in the area around Bonn. There may also have been another Count Eremfried in the Hesbaye region in eastern Belgium. This makes it difficult to be sure about the trajectory of his life, and he may have died relatively young. In contrast, authors such as Jongbloed (2009) claim a long career, ending about 965 or even later.

== Parent's memorial ==
There is no consensus about how Yrimfrid was described on the memorial. Jongbloed (2006), citing Muller and Bouman (1920), believes the original transcription said "Victor". Aarts, using Vollgraff and van Hoorn (1936), believes the original transcription said "Rector".

There is also no consensus about whether the memorial text means he was a count at the time the grave was made. Bas Aarts has for example interpreted the term "rector" as meaning he was a lay abbot of an Abbey, and Hein Jongbloed has speculated that "victor" means he was successful in some military endeavor. Rector could be a term for a leader in both church or secular positions.

== Was he a count? ==
Many of the surviving records for an Iremfrid in this region and period are for a person with the rank of count. On his parents' memorial he was not marked as a count, but one brother certainly was, Nevelung, and another, Rodolf, was described as preses, which could refer either to a secular or church title. The grave however mentions that two brothers were buried with the parents, presumably not too long after. One is probably Nevelung, according to the 943 grant which Irimfrid's brother Bishop Balderic of Utrecht addressed to Nevelung's wife. So as pointed out by Aarts, probably also either Irimfrid or Rodolf must also have died not long after the memorial was made (when Nevelung was still alive), and probably by 943. Jongbloed argues that the 943 record's reference to the family sins of Nevelung and his brother-in-law Regnier II implies that he lost his title before dying, and that Irimfrid must have inherited this comital title. This was presumably during the rebellions which ended with the Battle of Andernach in 939, which his in-laws were certainly involved in.

== Possible other identifications ==
=== Rhineland count ===
Even if Iremfrid was a count, identifying possessions of his is made difficult because he had contemporaries with the same name, most notably, Ehrenfried II of the Ezzonids, ancestor of the Counts Palatine (Pfalzgrafen) of Lotharingia, whose family's power base was near Bonn in what is now Germany. But there may have been more.

Areas held by a count of this name in what is now Germany include the Zülpichgau (942), the Bonngau (945), the Tubalgau (Duffelgau) (948), Hubbelrath in the Keldachgau (950), Hettergau (956), and Mühlgau (966). Other generations of the Ezzonid family did not hold Hettergau or Duffelgau, which do however border on Betuwe (as well as Keldachgau), and so Hettergau and Duffelgau are argued by some historians such as Jongbloed and Aarts to be adult sightings of Iremfrid the son of Ricfrid, now a count. Other evidence which associates them with the area includes the necrologium in Xanten, in Hettergau (and later Guelders) there is a death commemorated for an "Irimfrith comes" (23 October), normally accepted to be Ricfrid's son, because the death is also noted in the Salvator church in Utrecht, and Bishop Balderic is also commemorated at both (27 December). Furthermore, later records about Bishop Balderic call say that he was "of Cleves", and that his father Ricfrid was "count of Cleves". Although such claims from the later middle ages are anachronistic, Jongbloed points out that Cleves covers territory equivalent to the earlier Tubalgau or Duffelgau.

=== Advocate of Stavelot ===
Jongbloed also proposes that the contemporary Emmo or Ehrenfried who had the advocacy of Stavelot Abbey in Belgium, and was a count in the Condroz, was the son of Ricfrid.

=== Count Immo? ===
Jongbloed equates him with the rebellious and crafty Count Emmo described by Widukind of Corvey as an important magnate in Lotharingia, respected by the Duke for his council.

=== Also called Ansfried? ===
Vanderkindere suggested that Ehrenfried was also called Ansfried, and equated him to Ansfried, the count of Huy who became bishop of Utrecht. This proposal became widespread in derivative literature but is no longer widely accepted by historians.

Thietmar of Merseburg refers to the "like-named paternal uncle (patruus) of Count Ansfrid" who held fifteen countships. (The uncle and nephew are sometimes referred to as Ansfried I and II, or II and III.)

To make his scheme work, Vanderkindere had to suggest that the elder Ansfried, was maternal, not paternal, uncle, and that he was the same person as Ehrenfried son of Ricfrid. According to this proposal Ehrenfried had a sister Herwesindis (not mentioned in the memorial of his father, but having the same name as his mother) who married a Lambert, Count of Louvain and Abbot of Gembloux, and they were parents of Ansfried III. In the ensuing generations, Baerten and other historians have shown this proposal to be unconvincing.

Ehrenfried and Ansfried are thought to have had some type of family relationship. As an example of a recent proposal, Jongbloed proposes alternatively that this younger Hereswind was the daughter of Ehrenfried, and wife of Ansfried II, not the mother of Ansfried III. Widukind of Corvey reported a Count Immo, which could be short of Iremfrid, who offered his daughter's marriage to a Count Ansfried, at a siege near Liège.

== Sources ==
- Aarts, Bas (1994) "Ansfried, graaf en bisschop. Een stand van zaken", in: J. Coolen en J. Forschelen (ed.), Opera Omnia II. Een verzameling geschied- en heemkundige opstellen, 7-85
- Aarts, Bas (2009) "Montferland' en de consequenties. De vroege burchten bij Alpertus van Metz", H.L. Janssen en W. Landewé (ed.), Middeleeuwse Kastelen in veelvoud. Nieuwe Studies over oud erfgoed (Wetenschappelijke Reeks Nederlandse Kastelenstichting 2) pp. 13–59. link
- Bachrach, Berhard S., and Bachrach, David S., (Translators and Editors), Widukind of Corvey’s Deeds of the Saxons, Catholic University Press, Washington, DC, 2014
- Baerten (1961) "Les Ansfrid au Xe siècle" Revue belge de Philologie et d'Histoire 39-4 pp. 1144–1158
- Butler, Alban and Burns, Paul. Butler's Lives of the Saints, Vol. 5, A&C Black, 1997
- Jongbloed, Hein H., (2006), "Immed “von Kleve” (um 950) – Das erste Klevische Grafenhaus (ca. 885-ca. 1015) als Vorstufe des geldrischen Fürstentums", Annalen des Historischen Vereins für den Niederrhein, Heft 209
- Jongbloed, Hein H., (2009) "Listige Immo en Herswind. Een politieke wildebras in het Maasdal (938-960) en zijn in Thorn rustende dochter", Jaarboek. Limburgs Geschied- en Oudheidkundig Genootschap vol. 145 pp. 9–67
- Muller, S and A. C. Bouman, (1920) Oorkondenboek van het Sticht Utrecht tot 1301, Bd. I, Utrecht 1920, Nr. l l S
- Vanderkindere, L. (1900) ‘A propos d´une charte de Baldéric d’Utrecht’, Académie royale de Belgique Bulletin de la Classe des Lettres et des Sciences Morales et Politiques (Bruxelles),
- Vanderkindere, Léon, (1902) La Formation territoriale des principautés belges au Moyen Âge, Bruxelles, H. Lamertin,
- Vollgraff, C.W. and G. van Hoorn, (1936) "Bijlage IV: Epitaphium Ricfridi" Opgravingen op het Domplein te Utrecht. Wetenschappelijke Verslagen III 1934 (Haarlem 1936), pp. 124–127.
- Warner, David A., Ottonian Germany. The Chronicon of Thietmar of Merseburg. Manchester, 2001.
- van Winter, (1981) Ansfried en Dirk, twee namen uit de Nederlandse geschiedenis van de 10e en 11e eeuw link
