= Immo (Lotharingian count) =

10th century Lotharingian nobleman

Count Emmo, Immo or Immon, was the name of at least one important Lotharingian nobleman in the 10th century, described by medieval annalists as a cunning strategist. Various life events of a nobleman of this name were recorded, although historians differ about exactly which records refer to the same person or people. The first record claimed for him shows him as a young noble granting land to a new vassal in the Condroz region in 934, a member of the entourage of Duke Gilbert of Lotharingia. During the revolt of Gilbert which ended at the Battle of Andernach in 939, he switched sides. After the revolt he was personally associated with the fort at Chèvremont, near Liège. It becomes difficult later in Immo's life to be sure that all records mentioning a count of this name are referring to the same person.

== Condroz 934 ==
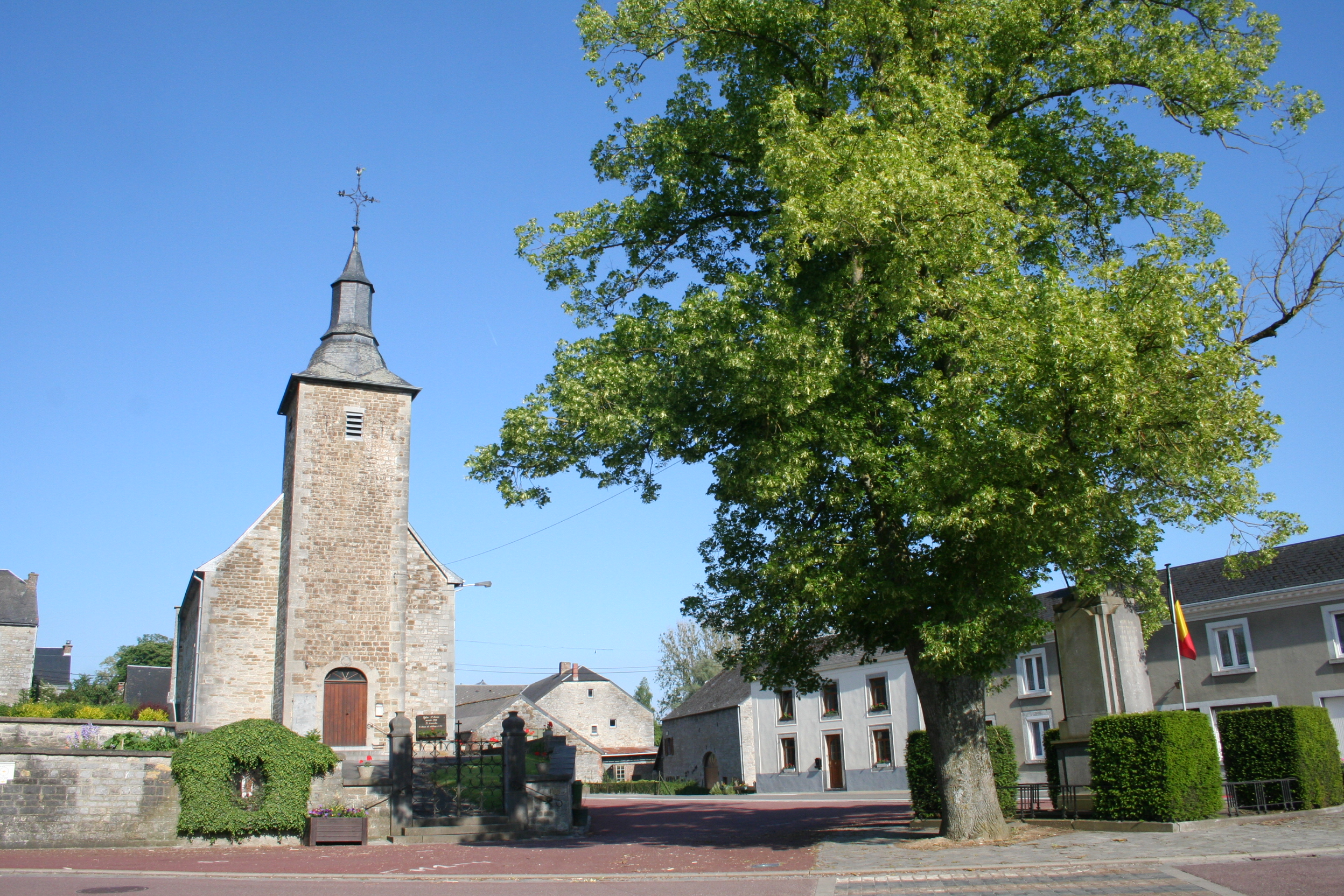
Ave-et-Auffe, owned by an early Count Immo and his brother Wibert in 934.

Kurth (1898) and Dierkens (1988) claimed that the first record of "Comte Immon" is in 934, where he appears in Waha, in Marche-en-Famenne as the brother of a Wibert, and relative of a Frederic. This document concerned property in the Condroz, according to Kurth in Ave-et-Auffe (fr) now in Rochefort, Belgium. That the charter, kept by the Abbey in Stavelot, was important is, says Kurth, proven by the fact that Duke Gilbert of Lotharingia himself and his entourage signed it, implying that Immo himself was part of this entourage. Kurth believed that this Immo was local to the region (now southern Belgium). Nemery believed (p. 147 fn) that this Immo might be too early to account for all the later records of Count Immo connected to it by Kurth, but he felt it could be a relative.

== "Crafty" Count Immo of the Lotharingian rebellion of 939 ==
During the Lotharingian rebellion of Duke Gilbert, which ended with the Battle of Andernach in 939, Widukind of Corvey describes Count Immo as "acute and exceptionally sly" (Latin "versutum et callidum nimis"), and Emperor Otto, who knew he was an important counselor to Gilbert, “decided it was better to use this man’s cunning rather than fight with arms”. Immo chose the stronger side, and Gilbert "took this badly" because Immo had been someone who had supported him and been loyal. Immo captured a fort, and then under siege captured an entire herd of the duke's pigs using a piglet, infuriating the duke and causing a mobilization against Immo. Immo then had a large number of beehives thrown at the duke's mounted men, causing the horses to be stung. The duke broke off the siege. Gilbert is reputed to have said “When Immo was with me, I was able to maintain the loyalty of all of the Lotharingians easily. Now, even with all of the Lotharingians, I am not able to capture him, while he stands alone.”

Widukind himself expressed uncertainty about a story that Immo later took up arms against king Otto, but "surrounded by an army" and "in the middle of the winter", he surrendered and became "faithful and useful" (fidelis et utilis, used to denote the behavior of those who Otto defeated and then forgave). One of the questions historians have is when this winter siege could have occurred. Jongbloed (2009 pp. 19–20) proposes that this rebellion must be a much later one known from the winter of 953/4.

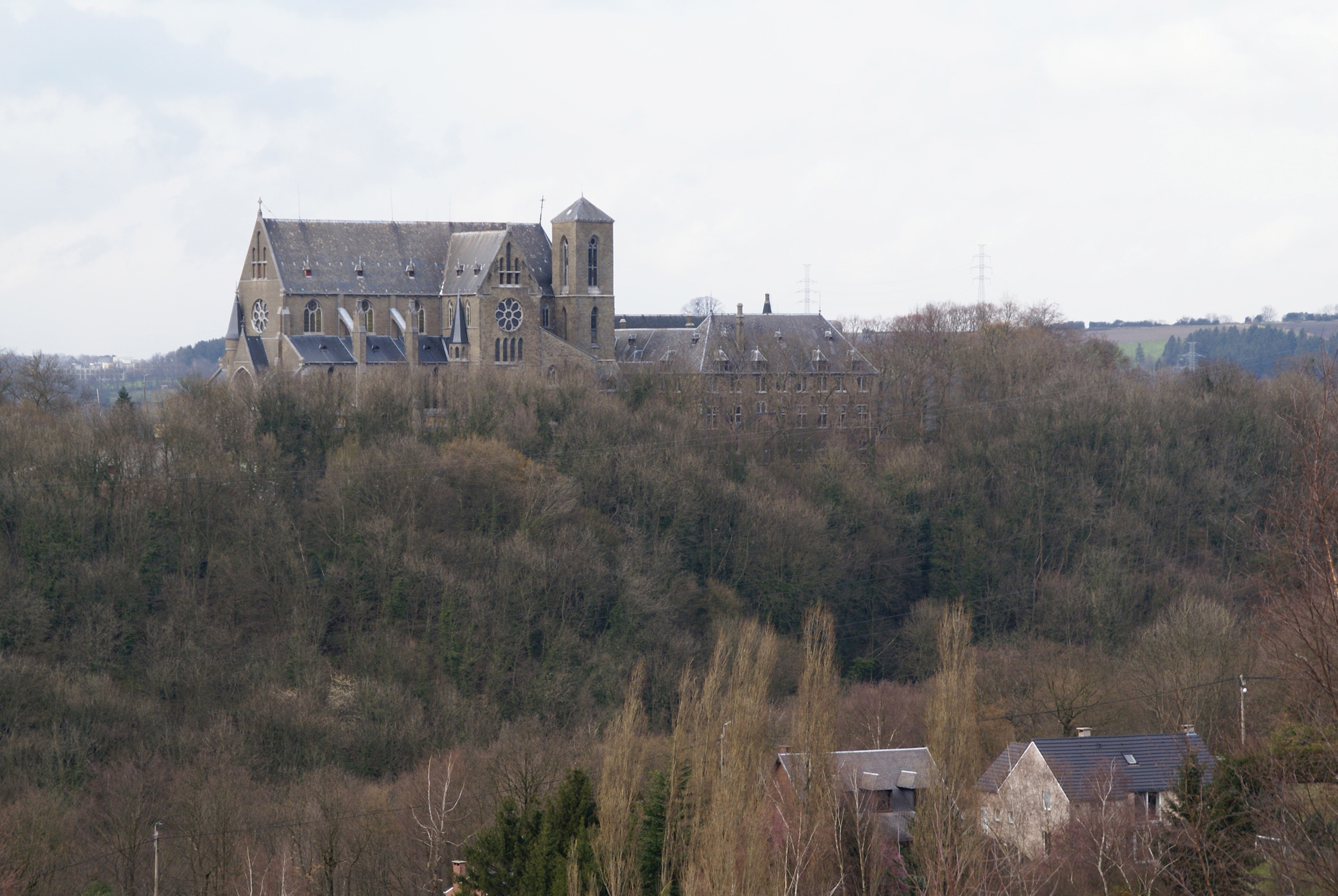
The Basilica of Chèvremont, near Chaudfontaine, on the site of an ancient castle.

Thirdly, Widukind reported that after the Battle of Andernach, where Duke Gilbert died, two Lotharingian nobles named Ansfrid and Arnold, held the fortification of Chèvremont near Liège. They were talked down by Count Immo who suggested they could still be allies against the king, and offered Ansfrid his only daughter's hand. He captured them when they came to meet, and sent them to the king, suggesting that Ansfrid would need the hardest torments during questioning. In this passage, Immo is described as having been brought up by Duke Gilbert, and always with him as a friend before the rebellion. As Dierkens has pointed out, this description matches the Immo of 934 in Waha, who seemed to be in the entourage of the Duke. Dierkens also believes that after the taking of Chèvremont, he possibly became the keeper of the fort for some decades.

== Activity during the 944 discontent (Count Immo) ==
In 944, Regino of Prüm reports (944 MGH p. 162) that during a period of apparent unrest caused by the dead Duke Gilbert's Regnarid family, there was a complaint to the king from the chapter of Saint Servatius in Maastricht against a count Immo. He had been impeding the sending of the Saint's relics to Duisburg, where the king would hold court. These relics had been held by Maastricht for the lifetime of Duke Gilbert (d.939), and were therefore due to return to the possession of Trier.

Historians see a possible connection with a grant made by the king to a faithful Rabangar, probably the owner of Ravengiersburg (de), near Koblenz. This grant was made on the recommendation of Count Immo.

== Possible connection to the castle of Logne ==
The Vita Brunonis altera describes how at a meeting of Lotharingian magnates in Aachen after Bruno became Duke in 953, an Emmo was enraged by the complaints of Abbot Odilo of Stavelot, and proceeded to take control of Stavelot possessions. Bruno eventually put him prison and made him promise not to repeat his actions, before being released. The Vita describes him as taking pledges of faith and it also describes him as a relative (propinquus) of either Bishop Balderic I of Liège (d.959), or Duke Bruno himself, who was a member of the royal family.

One of the possessions which was taken back into the possession of Stavelot at this time was the castrum of Logne, in the Ardennes, and this has led to suggestions that this particular Immo is the soldier, not described as a count, (Emmo de Longia, qui erat miles Hugonis ducis) who fell fighting under Hugh Capet in 976 in Hainaut. Note that as this man died fighting in 976, he was unlikely to have been the noble who first appears in a 934 record.

== Rebellion of 959-960 (Immo) ==
11 June 958, there are signs of a connection between Immo and Namur, and of tension once more increasing with the central royal power. A charter of King Otto orders his brother Bruno and Count Godfrey that they should give Chastre (near Namur), which Immo once had, to Tietbold their follower. This is described as being in the Darnegau (fr), in the county of Count Robert (of Namur).

Flodoard reported that in 959 Count Robert I of Namur and his ally named Immo, who was a counselor of Bruno, each fortified a stronghold, Robert at Namur, and Immo at Chevremont - the same fortification where "crafty" Count Immo, probably the same man, had talked down Duke Gilbert's nephews years earlier. Because the fortification was well-prepared and foraging was difficult in the countryside around it, Bruno had to withdraw from a siege there.

== After 960 ==
In a charter dated 20 Apr 963 in Liège, Robert count of Namur (no longer in rebellion) signed first, and after him (according to the interpretation of Jongbloed) counts Giselbert (of the Ardennengau), Folcwin (of Huy), Emmo and Herman. This appears to be a collection of some of the most important counts from the Liège region.

17 January 966, a royal charter states that a certain Rudolf's property at Gelmen (today divided between St Truiden and Heers, but then in the county of a Count Werner in the pagus of Hesbaye) had been confiscated because of his infidelity, and was now in hands of the Collegiate church of Maria in Aachen. Instead, "our faithful Count Immo" would receive it and in exchange gave a large number of possessions scattered between various counties:

- In the country (pagus) of Liugas east of Liège, in the county of Count Richar (in pago Liuhgouui in comitatu Richarii), Furon, Curcella,
- In the country of the Moilla gau (de) in the county of Count Eremfried (in pago Mulehkeuue in comitatu Eremfredi) Herklenze, Hostrich, Berge, Ricolferod, Wazzerlar,
- In the Auelgau (de) in the county of Eberhard (in pago Auvlgowi in comitatu Eberhardi) Limberge, Rameresdorf, Dullendorf, Breitenbach, Zeizendorp.

Various historians believe that the faithful count Immo here is "crafty" Count Immo (without agreeing on his origins).

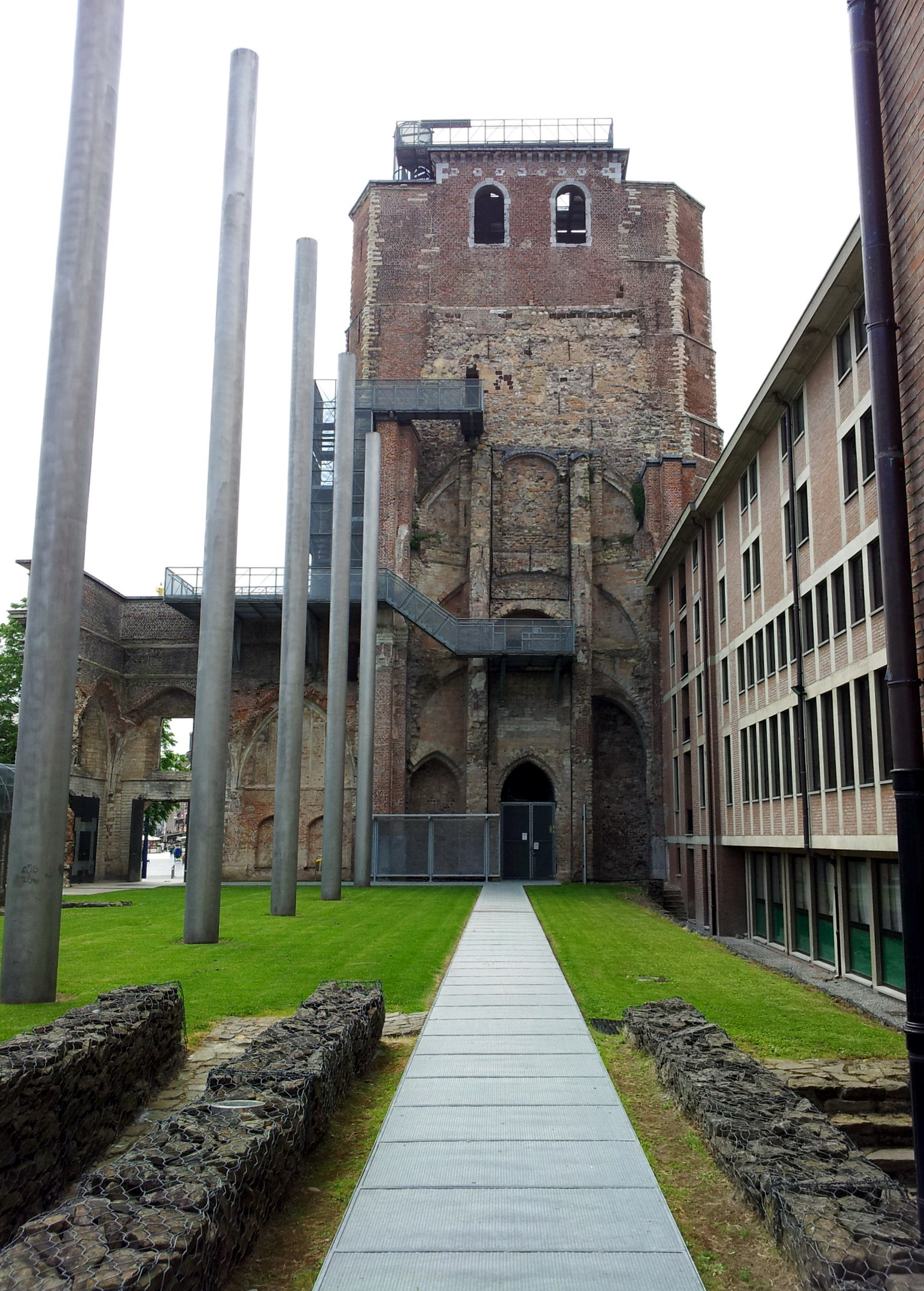
Remnants of the once powerful Abbey of St Truiden (St Trudo, St Trond).

In 968 Baerten believes it is the same count Immo again who appears in an important charter concerning the allodial lands of the Regnarids near Meerssen, granted by the widow of the late Duke Gilbert (d. 939) to the Abbey of Saint-Remi. Count Emmon appears here as advocatus (Dierkens says advocatus of St Remy) and another important witness appears to be the man crafty count Immo tricked off the Chèvremont, Ansfried the elder.

Vanderkindere speculated that Count Immo in his later years, after the death of Werner in 973, might have taken over a county in the Hesbaye area near his possession of Gelmen. He proposed that this would explain why one of the first count of Loon, several generations later, was also known as Emmo or Immo.

== Other possible records ==
=== 981 muster ===
In 981 "Herman or Ammo" had to supply 60 armored riders to the Liège bishop for the up-coming Italian campaign. If this is read as describing two people, rather than a name and a nickname for example, then it implies that these two men were responsible for mustering soldiers in the Liège region. Dierkens believes these two men had responsibility to actually bring the forces to the King, but does not believe that this would be crafty Immo. As he and other historians note though, the same two names appear among the witnesses in the 963 Liège charter.

=== The related name Irimfrid ===
The name Emmo or Immo was at least originally a short-form of longer names such as Irmenfried or Irimfrid, which also had short forms such as Immed and Ezzo in some families. There were one or more counts named Ehrenfried in the Hesbaye region and the Liège region, both in what is now eastern Belgium, near the Meuse river. Trying to identify the connections of this person (or persons) has therefore also been important in discussions about the origins of the 11th century County of Loon and County of Duras.

Although a more local explanation has also been proposed, for example by Godefroid Kurth, some or even most of the records proposed for this person are proposed by other historians to be either Yrimfrid, son of Ricfrid, whose family is associated with what is now the Netherlands, to the north, or "Erenfried II" (as he is known in some modern scholarship), apparent father of Hermann Pusillus of the "Ezzonid" family in what is now Germany, to the east. However, records for these two counts from their proposed Rhine homelands are in fact very poor, so there is disagreement about how to distinguish them, and this can only be considered based on other information about probable connections of other members of the two families to those places. In fact, it has also historically been proposed, for example by Léon Vanderkindere (1902), that these two are the same person, and even now the ancestry of the Ezzonid Erenfried II remains uncertain, whereas in the case of the son of Ricfried, nothing is certain except his parentage and siblings.

Alternatively, Vanderkindere, writing around 1900, and Baerten, in the 1960s, distinguished two counts, one who used the short name-forms such as Emmo or Immo and the other who used long forms such as Ehremfried. More recently, Donald C. Jackman (2010, p. 60) has proposed distinguishing those who are recorded with "I" or "Y" spellings such as "Yrimfrid" and "Immo", which he considers to be typical of the northern family of Ricfried, from those with "E" spellings.

While Ricfried's brother and father are associated with Betuwe (Batavia) and Cleves (in this period, the Duffelgau (de)), the Ezzonids are considered to come from the region around Bonn in this period, and Ehrenfried the father of Hermann is associated with records in the Zülpichgau (de) (942), in the Bonngau (de) (945), in Hubbelrath (de) in the Keldach or Gellep gau (de) (950). This means the areas associated with them are two ends of one continuous stretch of the Rhine river, where it comes near the Meuse. Between them, the following records are the subject of disagreement, being between the proposed homelands of the two families:

- 4 May 947 there is a royal charter concerning villa Mündelheim (de) in the pagus of the Hatteri (Hettergau) in the county of Erenfrid.
- In 948 there is a record of villa called Rindern in the pagus of Duffelgau (Tubalgowe), in the county of count Irinvrid.

For historians such as Jongbloed who accept that "Crafty" count Immo was the same as the advocatus count Ehremfried, the rebellion in 959/60 is the last relatively sure sighting in the records. More records are proposed to be relevant, but there are differing opinions about whether these are the same person. But Count Robert, involved in that rebellion, managed to maintain his position in Namur, and appears soon with a count Emmo. On the other hand, in Gembloux there are signs of an Ehremfried related to the Abbot and the advocatus, who leads Aarts (1994 fn.103) to propose that the Ehremfried in the Hesbaye of this period might be distinct from both the son of Ricfrid or the father of Hermann:

11 April 961, an Ermenfried swapped a villa Steria monticula (Stier in Donceel) in Hesbaye for a church at Agioniscurta (Incourt) owned by the Abbey of Gembloux. He is described as a relative (compater) of the Abbot of Gembloux Erluin who was a party to the exchange. He is not called a count. He had a wife Reinsede. Possibly the same Eremfried appears a few lines later in 964, where the advocatus of Gembloux, Goderan, is described as having a son Erenfried with his wife Adelinde (again, not called a count). It is not clear if this man is connected to the count who starts appearing in subsequent records.

In 967 in a grant involving lands which are walking distance from Gelmen, Eremfridus, Herman, Reynerus and Rodulfus appear as first witnesses in a grant by Bertha, the mother of a Count Arnulf, of land in Brustem (today in St Truiden) to the Abbey of St Truiden. Again the name Herman appears. Jongbloed believes that this must be the same Eremfried as in 963.

In a charter made in Capua, 26 July 982, "on the day that we fight the Saracens" Otto II certified that if a certain "Cunradus, son of the late count Rudolf" died, he wanted his possessions in Lotharingia to go to Gorze Abbey, and these included "curtis Velm in pago Haspongowe et in comitate Eremfridi comitis". Velm is walking distance from Gelmen and Brustem. In the Battle of Cotrone itself (13 July 982, so it had already happened) it seems that both this Conrad, and this count Eremfried, lost their lives. Velm, now part of St Truiden, did come under Gorze Abbey, and a Count Irimfrid was recorded as dying. However, this Conrad's possessions were widespread, and on the basis of those Vanderkindere (1902 pp. 340–1) believes his father was Rodolphe Count of Ivois. Of this Count however, Vanderkindere (p. 342) says that given his connection to Velm it is "not without some likelihood" that he is a member of the Regnarid family, where the name Rodolphe was familiar. According to Aarts (1994 fn.103) Ulrich Nonn believes the count Eremfrid in Haspengouw here is the same as the one who had been advocatus of Stavelot. Gorze Abbey was associated with the Abbeys of both Gembloux and St Truiden.

=== Advocatus of Stavelot Abbey ===
The "advocatus" of Stavelot in this period is possibly a separate person, but it is difficult to disentangle all records. He was generally referred to as Eremfried, and is only referred to as a count in later records.

Until the rebellion of Duke Gilbert he had been lay abbot of Stavelot, but from 938, the Abbey had an Abbot, and the King himself became the advocatus, with a "subadvocatus" who ran the position under him. In 943 there are two records with an Odilard in this position, with an Eremfried as witness, and then in the same year, Eremfried is in this position, 947, 953 twice, 956 and 959. He was not described as a count. In 953, Eremfried signed twice in August, the second time being a confirmation by his superior as advocatus, Duke Conrad the Red. Conrad was however in the midst of being pushed out of his position as Duke, and replaced by Bruno the great. Jongbloed believes this shows that Eremfried was taking a rebellious position with Conrad, and can be equated to a rebel named Emmo mentioned in the Vita Brunonis altera in September 953, one month later. (Jongbloed therefore believes this is the winter rebellion Widukind was uncertain about.)

The record of May 959 describes Eremfried as "advocatus and count", and can be read together with another record of Stavelot in April 958 or 959. According to the interpretation of Jongbloed, these describe Eremfried as a count (or future count) in Condroz, but not in the part of Condroz which was in the County of Huy. Other interpreters see him as being described as a Count (or future count) of Huy. He apparently held Atrin (fr) in Clavier, Liège, on the boundary with Huy.

== Sources ==
- Aarts, Bas (1994) "Ansfried, graaf en bisschop. Een stand van zaken", in: J. Coolen en J. Forschelen (ed.), Opera Omnia II. Een verzameling geschied- en heemkundige opstellen, 7-85
- Aarts, Bas (2009) "Montferland' en de consequenties. De vroege burchten bij Alpertus van Metz", H.L. Janssen en W. Landewé (ed.), Middeleeuwse Kastelen in veelvoud. Nieuwe Studies over oud erfgoed (Wetenschappelijke Reeks Nederlandse Kastelenstichting 2) pp. 13–59. link
- Bachrach, Berhard S. (2014), Widukind of Corvey's Deeds of the Saxons, Washington, D. C.: Catholic University Press, pp. 83–87, ISBN 9780813226934
- Baerten (1961), "Les Ansfrid au Xe siècl e", Revue Belge de Philologie et d'Histoire, 39 (4): 1144–1158, doi:10.3406/rbph.1961.2390
- Baerten, J (1962), "Le comté de Haspinga et l'avouerie de Hesbaye (IXe-XIIe siècles)", Revue Belge de Philologie et d'Histoire, 40 (4): 1149–1167, doi:10.3406/rbph.1962.2438
- Baerten (1965), "Les origines des comtes de Looz et la formation territoriale du comté (suite et fin)", Revue Belge de Philologie et d'Histoire, 43 (4)
- Baerten, Jean (1969), Het Graafschap Loon (11de - 14de eeuw) (PDF)
- Dierkens, Alain (1993), "Un membre de l'aristocratie lotharingienne au X' siècle: le comte Immon", Chèvremont, Un Tricentenaire, Un Millénaire: 21–32
- Jackman, Donald C. (2010-10-25), Hochstaden: Public Succession in Ripuaria of the High Middle Ages, p. 60, ISBN 9781936466573
- Jongbloed, Hein H. (2006), "Immed "von Kleve" (um 950) – Das erste Klevische Grafenhaus (ca. 885-ca. 1015) als Vorstufe des geldrischen Fürstentums" (PDF), Annalen des Historischen Vereins für den Niederrhein, 209, doi:10.7788/annalen.2006.209.1.13, S2CID 180819126, archived from the original (PDF) on 2018-01-16
- Jongbloed, Hein H. (2009), "Listige Immo en Herswind. Een politieke wildebras in het Maasdal (938-960) en zijn in Thorn rustende dochter", Jaarboek. Limburgs Geschied- en Oudheidkundig Genootschap, 145: 9–67
- Kurth, Godefroid (1889), "Le Comte Immon", Bulletin de l'Académie Royale des Sciences, des Lettres et des Beaux-Arts de Belgique: 320–333
- Nemery, Eugène (1960–1961), "L'alleu d'Auffe (Xe siècle), son morcellement pendant le Moyen Âge" (PDF), Annales de la Société Archéologique de Namur, 50: 136–204
- Vanderkindere, Léon (1900), "A propos d´une charte de Baldéric d'Utrecht", Académie Royale de Belgique Bulletin de la Classe des Lettres et des Sciences Morales et Politiques (Bruxelles)
- Vanderkindere, Léon (1902), "Chapter 9" (PDF), La formation territoriale des principautés belges au Moyen Age, vol. 2, p. 128
- van Winter (1981), Ansfried en Dirk, twee namen uit de Nederlandse geschiedenis van de 10e en 11e eeuw
- Verdonk, Henk (2012) Alzey-Zutphen. Een onderzoek naar het rijksleen te Alzey van de graven van Zutphen.

== Primary sources ==
- Annales necrologici Fuldenses MGH SS folio XIII p.205
- Cartulaire de l'abbaye de Saint-Trond Piot edition, Volume 1
- Vita Brunonis Altera can be found in MGH SS folio IV. p.275 ff
- Flodoard, Annales, can be found in MGM SS folio III. pp.363 ff. See p.404, p.407
- Gesta Abbatum Gemblacensium MGH SS folio VIII p.529, p.530
- Indiculus loricatorum p.633. MGH Const I 436
- Miraeus (1734) 2nd ed. (Foppens ed.) Opera Diplomatica et Historica Vol III
- Camps ed. Oorkonden van Noord-Brabant 690-1312 p.31 ff
- Regino of Prüm, Chronicon, can be found in MGH SS rer. Germ. L
- Revue Mabillon VI p.267
- Sloet ed. (1872), Oorkondenboek der graafschappen Gelre en Zutphen tot op den slag van Woeringen, 5 juni 1288, Bd. I
- Widukind of Corvey, Res gestae saxonicae sive annalium can be found in MGH SS rer. Germ. LX
- Halkin, J., and C.G. Roland eds, (1909) Recueil des chartes de l'Abbaye de Stavelot-Malmédy.
- Wampach, Camille, ed. (1935) Urkunden- und Quellenbuch zur Geschichte der altluxemburgischen Territorien bis zur burgundischen Zeit, Vol.1.
