= Erluin =

Erluin, also found in the forms Erluinus, Erlwin, Eorlewinus, Herluin, and Harlewin, is a medieval name, composed of the Germanic elements erl, meaning free man or noble man, and win, meaning friend.

Notable bearers of the name include:

- Erluin (nobleman), prefect of the palace at Ingelheim c. 874
- Erluin I of Gembloux, abbot of Gembloux 946–987
- Erluin II of Gembloux, abbot of Gembloux 991–1012
- Erluin of Cambrai, bishop of Cambrai 995–1012
- Herluin de Conteville (died c. 1066), step-father of William the Conqueror
- Herluin of Bec (died 1078), founder of the abbey of Bec
