= Gerardus Rubens =

Belgian abbot (1674–1736)

The Reverend Lord Gerardus Rubens OCist
- Abbas S. Bernardi ad Scaldim.
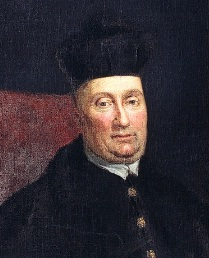
- portrait in Bornem Abbey
- Church: Roman Catholic
- Predecessor: Cornelius Addriaenssens
- Successor: Alexander Adriaenssens

Orders
- Consecration: 1722

Personal details
- Born: Gerard; 1674 Brussels
- Died: 1736 (aged 61–62) Hemiksem

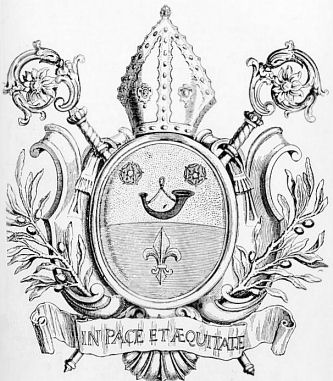
Crest of Gerardus Rubens, Abbot Ocist

Pierre-Eugène-Aloys OCist, also known as Gerardus Rubens (born 1674; died 21 January 1736), was the 42nd Abbot of the Common Observance in St. Bernard's Abbey, Hemiksem.

He was the son of Aloysius Rubens and Anne de Deckers, and related to the Painter Peter Paul Rubens. He was baptised in the Coudenberg Church. His parents died at young age, and he was educated by his uncle the reverend Eugenius Rubens.

== Career ==
He entered Hemiksem Abbey in 1693 and took his vows. After his ordination he studied in Louvain in the College of the Order. In 1722, he was elected Abbot and followed to Cornelius Addriaenssens as Abbot of Hemiksem Abbey. His arms are the ones of the House of Rubens and his Motto was in Pace et equitate. He took a seat of the States of Brabant, though his political influence was not important. The archduchess, however, sent him to Orval Abbey to fight Jansenism, which was considered as a major problem.

During the period of his abbacy, the abbey acquired many important grounds and the abbey managed to grow to an important economic institution. With this financial capital, the abbot spent important sums to the decoration of the abbey church and the abbey library. Historically, he is considered as one of the important people for the history of the abbey.

He was succeeded by Alexander Adriaenssens. His portrait is kept in Bornem Abbey.
