= Exuperius (disambiguation) =

Exuperius (Exsuperius, Exupéry, Essuperio) may refer to:

- St. Exuperius (Exupéry, Soupire), a bishop of Toulouse
- St. Exuperius (Theban Legion), one of the members of the Theban Legion
- St. Exuperius of Bayeux, a bishop of Bayeux
- Exuperius and Zoe, martyrs
- Exuperius (moth), a genus of snout moths

== See also ==
- Expeditus
- Exuperantius
