= Erluin of Gembloux =

Erluin of Gembloux may refer to:

- Erluin I of Gembloux (died 987), abbot
- Erluin II of Gembloux (died 1012), abbot
