= Benedict Neefs =

The Reverend Lord Benedictus Neefs OCist
- Abbas S. Bernardi ad Scaldim
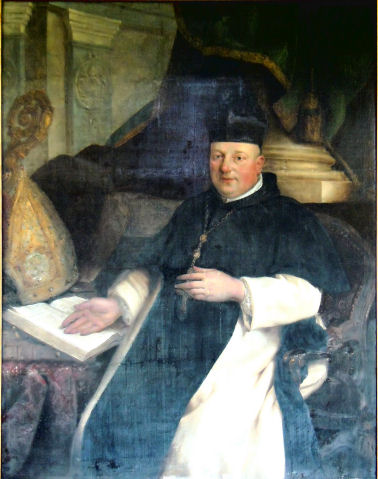
- Dom Benedictus, abbot of Hemiksem
- Church: Roman Catholic
- Predecessor: Norbertus Bruyndonckx
- Successor: Raphael Seghers

Orders
- Ordination: 1780

Personal details
- Born: Corneel; 19 January 1741 Kontich, Southern Netherlands
- Died: 7 November 1790 (aged 49) Brussels, Southern Netherlands

Dom Benedictus Neefs, O.Cist. (French: Benoit Neefs; 19 January 1741 – 7 November 1790) was the 46th abbot of Hemiksem Abbey.

Corneel Neefs was born in Kontich and entered Hemiksem Abbey in 1762, taking the monastic name Benedictus.

== Abbot of Hemiksem ==
In 1780 he was elected abbot after the death of Abbot Bruyndonckx, and installed after imperial approbation. He sat in the States of Brabant after the death of the abbot of Vlierbeek as a representative of the first estate. His local and economic power reached far beyond the monastery walls, as the territory of the abbey was extensive. He erected multiple buildings and continued to reshape the abbey buildings during his time in office. He commissioned an impressive calvary for the abbey church from the painter Willem Jacob Herreyns.

Neefs was known for his public opposition to the reforms of Emperor Joseph II. Together with Godfried Hermans, abbot of Grimbergen, he firmly protested against the reforms. The two of them became significant leaders of clerical resistance and both participated in processions and consulted with Hendrik Van der Noot. Both abbots financially supported Pro Aris et Focis.

He died in 1790, in his monastery's Refugium in Brussels. He was succeeded by Dom Raphaël Seghers who would be the last abbot of Hemiksen. The portrait of Neefs is preserved at Bornem Abbey.
