= Gembloux Abbey =

Coordinates: 50°33′44″N 4°41′42″E

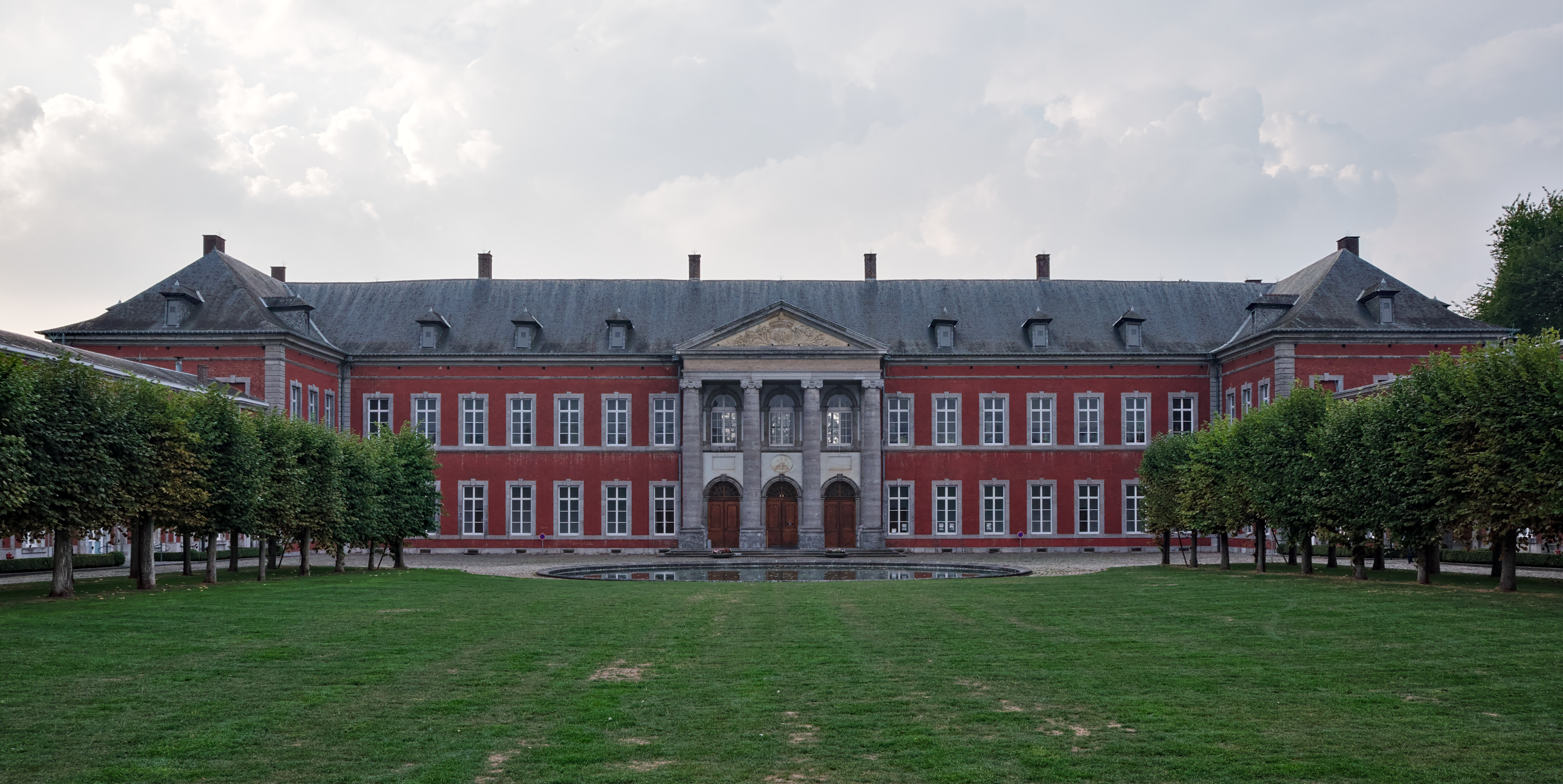
Gembloux Abbey

Gembloux Abbey (French: Abbaye de Gembloux) was a Benedictine abbey near Gembloux in the province of Namur, Wallonia, Belgium. Since 1860, its buildings have hosted the University of Liège's Gembloux Agro-Bio Tech faculty and campus (previously known as Agronomical University of Gembloux).

== Foundation ==
The former Benedictine monastery, located about nine miles north-west of Namur on the river Orneau, was supposedly founded about 945 by Saint Guibert or Wibert (lat: Wicbertus) and dedicated to Saint Peter and the martyr Saint Exuperius. Saint Guibert was assisted in the erection of the monastery and the selection of its monks by Erluin, who had resigned a canonry to become a monk. Some of Guibert's relatives challenged the legality of the monastic foundation on the grounds that the monastery was built on land of the Imperial fisc, which had been given in fee to Guibert's ancestors and could not be alienated without imperial authority. Emperor Otto I summoned Guibert and Erluin to his court but was so favourably impressed with the manner in which they defended their undertaking that on 20 September 946, he issued an imperial diploma approving the foundation of Gemblacum and granting it various privileges.

Guibert appointed his friend Erluin the first abbot of Gembloux, while he himself became a monk at Gorze Abbey near Metz. He returned twice to Gembloux. The first time was in 954, when the Hungarians threatened to pillage the monastery. Guibert not only saved it from harm but also converted some Hungarians to Christianity. The second time was in 957, when his brother-in-law Heribrand of Mawolt had seized the revenues of the monastery. Guibert persuaded Heribrand to leave the possessions of the monastery unmolested in the future. On 23 May 962, Guibert died at Gorze and his remains were brought for burial to Gembloux.

== Flourishing ==
When monastic discipline was well established at Gembloux, Erluin attempted, at the suggestion of Count Regnier of Hainaut, to reform Lobbes Abbey in what is now Belgium in 955. The monks of Lobbes however did not welcome reform, and on the night of 20 October 958 three of them assaulted Erluin in his cell, dragged him outside the monastery and inflicted on him serious bodily injuries. Erluin died at Gembloux on 10 August 986 after Pope Benedict VII had granted his monastery exemption and papal protection.

During the short reign of his successor, abbot Heriward (987-990), the monks voluntarily relinquished their right of exemption in favour of Bishop Notger of Liège, who was well disposed towards the monastery. Heriward was succeeded by Erluin II (990-1012), under whose weak administration monastic discipline greatly relaxed.

His successor Olbert (1012-1048), a pious and learned abbot, restored discipline, built a new abbey church in 1022, organized a rich library, and by encouraging sacred and secular learning gave the first impulse to the subsequent flourishing condition of Gembloux. During the period of its greatest intellectual activity the abbey was ruled by Mysach (1048-1071), Thietmar (1071-1092), Liethard (1092-1115) and Anselm (1115-1136).

Under Thietmar flourished the famous chronicler Sigebert of Gembloux (1030-1112), who in a neat Latin style wrote a chronicle of the world from 381-1111, a history of the abbots of Gembloux and other historical works of great value. His chronicle was continued by Abbot Anselm till 1136, and his history of the abbots of Gembloux by the monk Gottschalk, a disciple of Sigebert. The learned prior Guerin, a famous teacher at the abbey school, was a contemporary of Sigebert.

== Decline ==
In 1157 and again in 1185 the monastery was destroyed by fire, and though rebuilt, it began from this period to decline in importance. The abbots did, however, continue to hold the title of count and to sit among the nobility in the States of Brabant.

In 1505, under Abbot Arnold II de Solbrecg (1501-1511), the abbey became affiliated to the Bursfeld Union.

It was pillaged by the Calvinists in 1598, and was partly destroyed by fire in 1678 and again in 1712. It was just beginning to recover from these heavy misfortunes when in 1793 the Revolutionary government suppressed it.

The buildings, which largely survived, are used for the Agronomical University of Gembloux.

== Sources ==
The main narrative source for the history of the monastery is the Deeds of the Abbots of Gembloux (Gesta abbatum Gemblacensium), begun by Sigebert of Gembloux in the 1070s and continued by Gottschalk of Gembloux until 1137. Sigebert also wrote a life of Guibert, the monastery's founder, the Vita Wicberti.

According to Babcock and Derolez, around fifty eleventh-century manuscripts from the monastery can now be found in the Royal Library of Belgium. Amongst these manuscripts is the unique surviving copy of the Versus de Unibove.

== Abbots ==
The succession of abbots is as follows:

- Erluin I
- Heriward
- Erluin II
- Olbert
- Mysach Mathelin
- Thietmar
- Liethard
- Anselm
- Arnold
- Petrus
- Odo
- Joannes
- Guibert Martin
- Guillaume
- Henri
- Arnold
- Guillaume
- Godfrey
- Jean de Brogne
- Joannes, abbot of Affligem (1259–1261)
- Rauol
- Arnold de Chastres
- Godfrey
- Arnold de Rosières
- Lambert de Liroux
- Nicolas de Rupemont
- Jean del Bare
- Jean de Walhain
- Louis d'Oinies
- Othon de Dave
- Jean de Carnières
- Jean d'Ittre
- Othon de Viviers
- Antoine de Bossunes
- Arnold de Solbrecq
- Mathieu Petri
- Antoine Papin
- Arnold Dumont
- Bernard Fourier
- Lambert Hancart
- Jean de Caverel
- Louis Sombeck
- Philippe Clocman
- Charles d'Ursel
- Gaspar Benselle
- Martin Draerck
- François Dumonceau
- Arnold de Mertz
- Pierre Dumonceau
- Ildephonse Chapelle (1732–1739)
- Eugène Gérard
- Jacques Legrain (1759–1791)
- Colomban Wilmart
