= Gottschalk of Gembloux =

Gottschalk of Gembloux (Note: Latin: Godescalcus Gemblacensis, sometimes anglicized "Godescalc".) (fl. 1112–1136) was a Benedictine monk and writer. He was a disciple of Sigebert at the abbey of Gembloux and wrote a continuation of the latter's history of the abbey, the Gesta abbatum Gemblacensium. There is consensus that Gottschalk added coverage of the abbacies of Tietmar, Liethard and Anselm from around 1072 down to 1136, but uncertainty as to whether he wrote of the preceding abbacy of Mysach. It is not known how long after 1136 Gottschalk was writing. His continuation is an important source for Sigebert's life. He also reports the famine that affected the Low Countries in 1095, leading to high grain prices, exploitation by money-lenders and increased mortality requiring mass graves.

Gottschalk is also the author of five poems. Four of these—an epitaph of Sigebert, a dialogue between himself and the Church, an etymology of 'Gembloux' and a notice of Anselm's acquisitions for the abbey—are incorporated into the Gesta. The fifth, Panegyricus libellus de abbatibus Gemblacensibus, is a separate work found in the same manuscript (Leipzig, Universitätsbibliothek, civ. Rep II).
