= Heriward =

Heriward (died 11 May 991) was the second abbot of Gembloux from 987. He succeeded his brother, Erluin I.

According to Sigebert, the historian of Gembloux, in his Gesta abbatum Gemblacensium ("Deeds of the Abbots of Gembloux"), Heriward was a monk at Mont-Saint-Michel for many years before the good reputation of the brothers of Gembloux convinced him to join them.

Shortly after Heriward's election, the monks decided to place themselves under the authority of the bishop of Liège. In gratefulness, the sitting bishop, Notker, granted the abbey the villa of Temploux, a vineyard and an estate a Namur.

Heriward died on 11 May 991 and was buried in the abbey church of Saint-Pierre. He was succeeded by a relative, Erluin II, described as a nephew of Bishop Erluin of Cambrai.
