= Lambert Hancart =

Lambert Hancart was abbot of Gembloux from 1557 until his death on 28 August 1578.

As a member of the States of Brabant, he was delegated to present the communications of the States General to Philip II of Spain.

After the Battle of Gembloux (1578) he prevented the plundering of the town of Gembloux.
