= St. Bernard's Abbey, Hemiksem =

Coordinates: 51.131°N 4.330°E

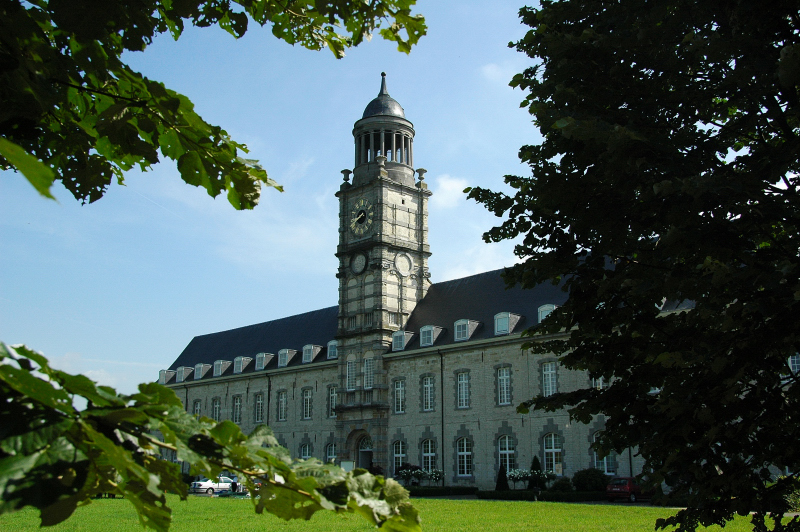
St. Bernard's Abbey, Hemiksem

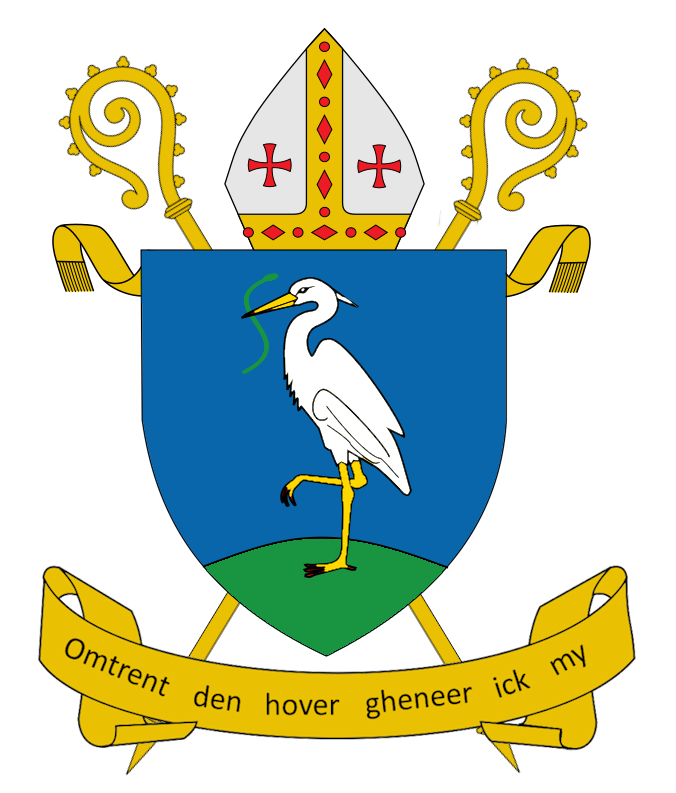
Coat of arms for St. Bernard's Abbey, Hemiksem

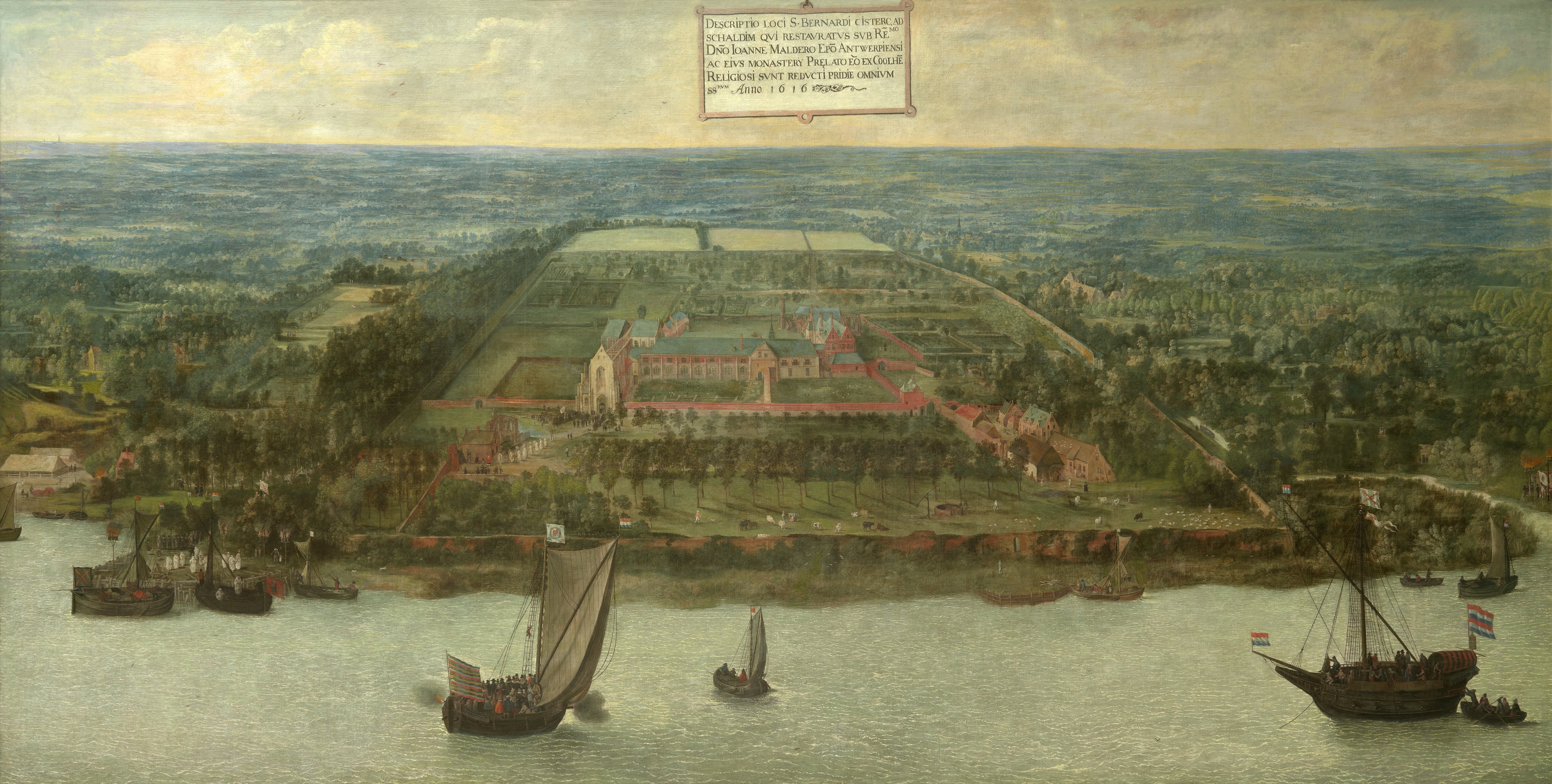
St. Bernard Abbey, by Jan Wildens in 1616

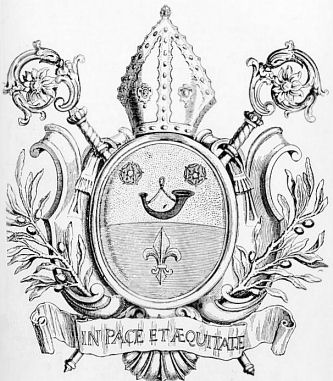
Crest of Gerardus Rubens, Abbot Ocist

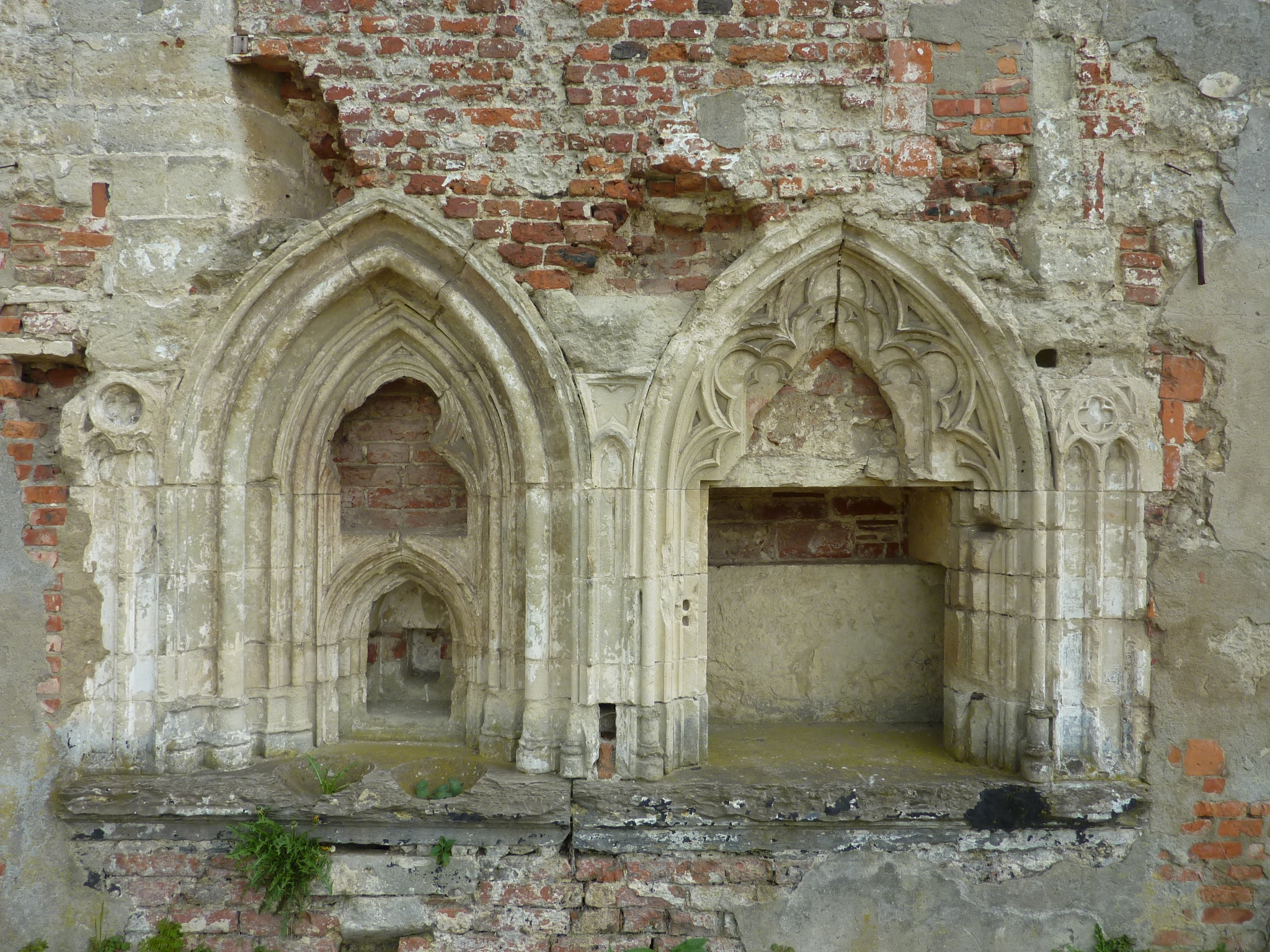
Two gothic niches. The only surviving parts of the abbey church

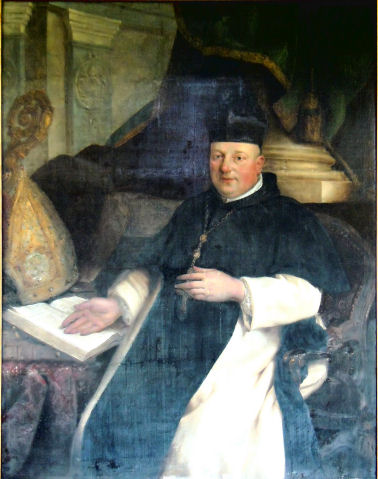
Abbot Benedict Neefs ca. 1780

St. Bernard's Abbey, Hemiksem, or abbatiae S. Bernardi ad Scaldim, ordinis Cisterciensis, in dioecesi Antverpiensi (Note: monasterium Sancti Bernardi apud Scelle//Monasterium Sancti Bernardi in Scelle // monasterium Sancti Bernardi iuxta Scelle //monasterium Sancti Bernardi de Scelle//monasterium Santi Bernardi prope Scelle) also known as St. Bernard's Abbey on the Scheldt (Sint-Bernardusabdij van Hemiksem; Abdij Sint-Bernaerdts aan de Schelde), located in Hemiksem in the province of Antwerp in Belgium, was a Cistercian monastery founded in 1243 and dissolved during the French Revolution. The buildings are now the property of the municipality of Hemiksem.

== History ==
The establishment of the abbey at Hemiksem, named after Saint Bernard of Clairvaux, was the result of the efforts of Duke Henry I of Brabant and after his death by his son, Duke Henry II, who saw the actual foundation of the abbey in 1243, which was confirmed by Pope Urban IV. The monastic community at Hemiksem, like all Roman Catholic clergy in the region, came under pressure in the late 16th century and in 1578, at the height of the iconoclastic movement (Beeldenstorm), the abbey stood entirely deserted for a time.

From 1570 to 1649 the position of abbot was held ex officio by the bishops of Antwerp.

In 1672 most of the buildings burnt down; the present buildings date from the late 17th and 18th centuries. The impressive western facade with tower of 42m high, was completed during the abatiat of Joannes van Heymissem.

The ca 30 monks were chased out of their abbey in 1797, the community was suppressed. Their important grounds, estates and rights were abolished during the French Revolution and the church demolished.

In 1836 the surviving members of the community bought the recently empty premises of Bornem Abbey and leaving Hemiksem for good, re-settled it as the still-extant Bornem Abbey.

=== Premises after the French Revolution ===
From 1811 the buildings were used as a naval hospital. In 1821, the Antwerp architect Pierre Bruno Bourla converted the abbey for use as a house of correction, with large dormitories, for the accommodation of over 1500 men, 450 women and a large number of children. The use of dormitories later fell out of favour, and from 1867, after conversion of the large open rooms into individual cells, the premises were reused as a military depot. Immediately after World War II the building was used as an internment facility for collaborators. From 1948 to 1977 it was again used by the military, and from 1977 stood empty.

The building was legally protected from 1973 and was bought by the municipality in 1988. After the west and east wings were restored they now accommodate the administrative centre of the municipality of Hemiksem, local police headquarters and service flats; a local history museum and the Roelants Museum (Note: dedicated to the display of the works of Joseph Roelants (1881-1962), designer and manufacturer of decorative ceramic tiles and panels at the local factory, Manufactures Céramiques d'Hemixem, Gilliot et compagnie) are located in the north wing. The distinctive silhouette of the principal range has become a symbol of the town.

== Abbots ==
- Joannes van Heymissem
- Gerardus Rubens
- Benedict Neefs

== Sources ==
- Hemiksem municipality: official website (in Dutch)
- Tourism in Rupelstreek (in Dutch)
- Roelants Museum (in Dutch)
