= Joannes van Heymissem =

The Reverend Lord Joannes van Heymissem OCist
- Abbas S. Bernardi ad Scaldim
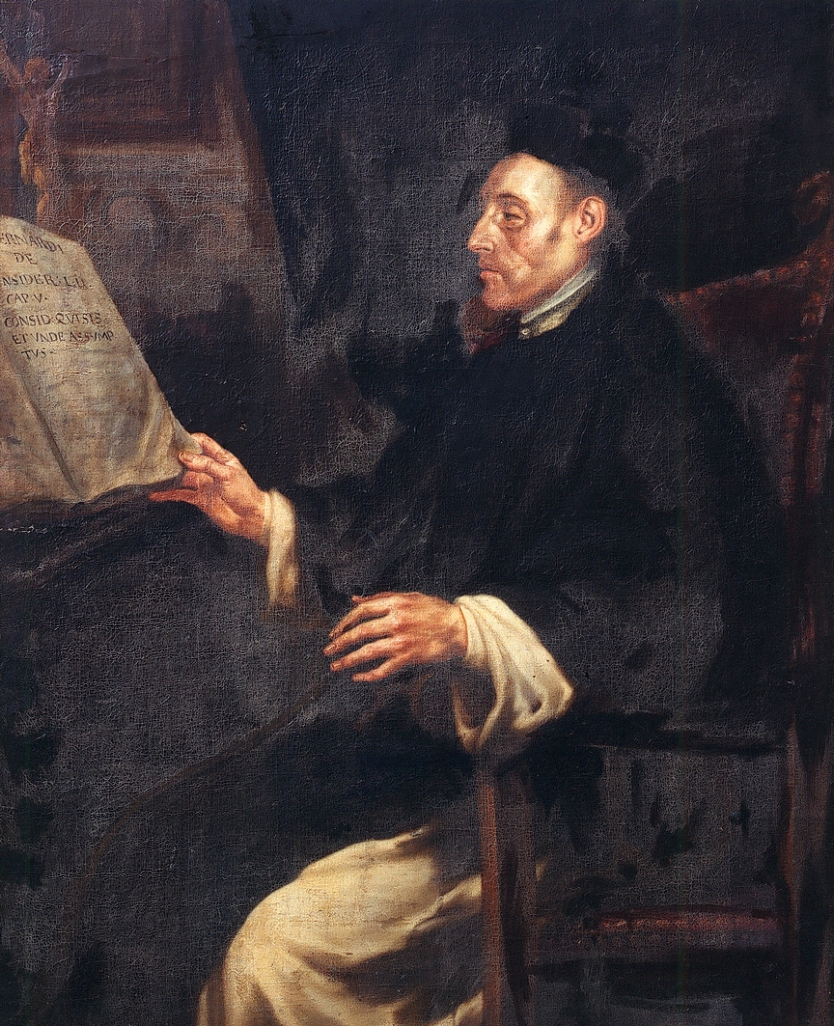
- Portrait by Jan van Helmont, dated 1678
- Church: Roman Catholic
- Predecessor: Judocus Gillis
- Successor: Antonius Spanoghe

Orders
- Ordination: 1660

Personal details
- Born: 1621 's-Hertogenbosch, Duchy of Brabant
- Died: 1678 (aged 56–57) Burtscheid, Holy Roman Empire

Joannes van Heymissen OCist (1621–1678) was the 36th abbot of Hemiksem Abbey.

== Career ==
Heymissen was born in 's-Hertogenbosch, which until 1629 was one of the four chief cities of the Duchy of Brabant in the Habsburg Netherlands. His father, an organist, later moved to Leuven, where Joannes was educated. He was related to the bishop of Antwerp, Mgr. Gaspard Nemius.

Heymissem completed his studies in philosophy at the University of Douai. In 1646 he entered the abbey of Hemiksem, and took his vows. He was unanimously elected abbot in 1660, following the death of Judocus Gillis. During his period as abbot the west front of the abbey, including the tower, were completed. However the abbey church was destroyed by a fire during works on the roof. He died in died Burtscheid Abbey and was buried in the church of Hemiksem. He was succeeded as abbot by Antonius Spanoghe.
