= Erluin II of Gembloux =

Erluin II (died 26 May 1012) was the third abbot of Gembloux from 991 until his death. He was a nephew of Bishop Erluin of Cambrai and a relative of the first two abbots of Gembloux, Erluin I and Heriward. The Auctarium Gemblacense, a continuation of the chronicle of Sigebert of Gembloux, calls him Erluinus iunior, Erluin the younger.

Before coming to Gembloux, Erluin was a monk at Gorze. Heriward died in May 991, and Erluin was elected to succeed him on 24 December. According to Sigebert and his anonymous continuator, under Erluin the abbey suffered lax discipline and as a result religious devotion and communal life declined. Erluin died on 26 May 1012 and was buried in the abbey church of Saint-Pierre, close to where his predecessor lay.
