= The Martyrdom of Saint Maurice =

Painting by El Greco

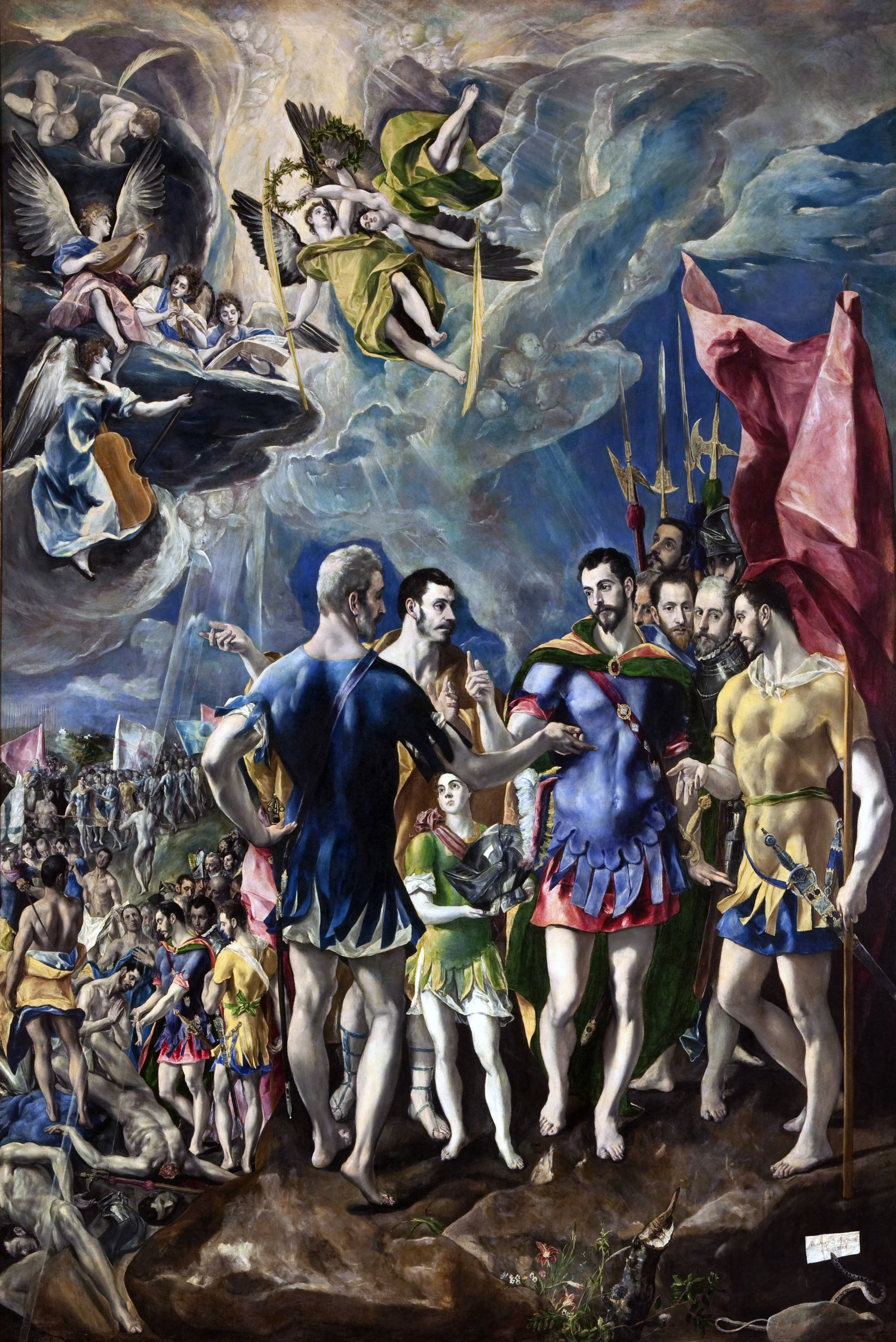
- Artist: El Greco
- Year: 1580-1582
- Medium: oil on canvas
- Dimensions: 445 cm × 294 cm (175 in × 116 in)
- Location: Monasterio de El Escorial, Madrid

The Martyrdom of Saint Maurice is a 1580-1582 painting by El Greco in the Real Monasterio de San Lorenzo de El Escorial near Madrid.

== History ==
A painting on this subject had originally been commissioned from Juan Fernández Navarrete by Philip II of Spain as an altarpiece dedicated to Saint Maurice and his Theban Legion. After Navarrete's death in 1579, Philip transferred the commission to El Greco, who had recently established himself in Toledo. The king saw the completed work in 1583, on his return from Portugal, and was unhappy with it.

== Description of painting ==
Maurice is shown in a blue breastplate and red tunic in the right foreground, surrounded by the officers of his legion while they decide whether to sacrifice to the pagan gods or accept martyrdom. To Maurice's left Saint Exuperius holds a red banner. Next to him is a bearded man in a tunic, identified as James the Less, who had converted the whole of Maurice's legion to Christianity. Between Maurice and the banner-bearer are two figures modelled on Spanish soldiers of the time - the elder one is Emmanuel Philibert, Duke of Savoy, commander of the Spanish troops at the Battle of St. Quentin in 1557 and Grand Master of the Military Order of Saint Maurice. To Emmanuel's right (closer to Maurice) is Alessandro Farnese, then fighting against the Dutch Republic.

The martyrdom occurs in the left background, including a figure modelled on Charles V's illegitimate son Don John of Austria, victor of the battle of Lepanto. In the left upper background angels wait to welcome the martyrs into heaven.

== See also ==
- List of works by El Greco

== Bibliography (in Spanish) ==
- ÁLVAREZ LOPERA, José, El Greco, Madrid, Arlanza, 2005, Biblioteca «Descubrir el Arte», (colección «Grandes maestros»). ISBN 84-9550-344-1.
- SCHOLZ-HÄNSEL, Michael, El Greco, Colonia, Taschen, 2003. ISBN 978-3-8228-3173-1.
- TÉLLEZ, Guillermo y MARTÍN, Pedro, El Greco, Triunfo en Toledo, fracaso en El Escorial, (colección Coliseo), Librosiberia, 2013. ISBN 978-84-87011-24-5.
- ArteHistoria.com. «El martirio de San Mauricio» [Consulta: 24.12.2010].
