= Henricus Smeulders =

The Reverend Lord Henricus Smeulders OCist
- ordinis procurator generalis
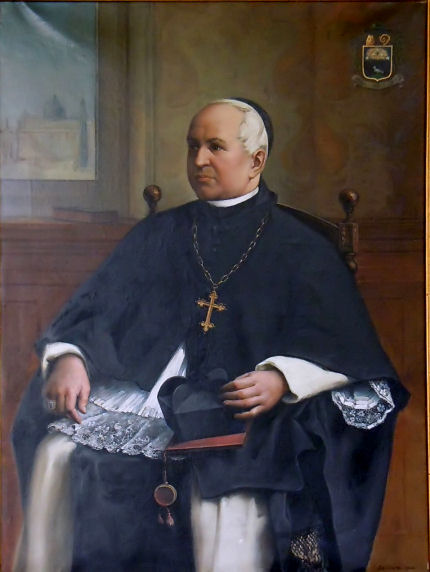
- Portrait inside Bornem Abbey
- Church: Roman Catholic
- Predecessor: Girolamo Bottino
- Other post: Titular abbot of Santa Maria di Valdiponte

Orders
- Ordination: 1878 in Rome

Personal details
- Born: Joseph-Gauthier-Henri; 13 May 1826 Mol, Antwerp Province, United Kingdom of the Netherlands
- Died: 28 June 1892 (aged 66) Rome, Italy
- Education: Gregorian University

Dom Henricus Smeulders, O.Cist. (13 May 1826 – 28 June 1892), born Joseph-Gauthier-Henri, was a Belgian Abbot of the Common observance. He was considered one of the major historical figures of Cistercian history of the second half of the 19th century.

== Career ==
He entered in 1843 in Bornem Abbey, 17 years old. He became Doctor of Theology in 1858 at the Gregorian University, Rome. During his life in Bornem he was between 1858 and 1865 Librarian. By request of the Abbot General he was sent back to Rome, and became famous for his knowledge of the Cistercian history. He was requested by the Italian Cistercian Congregation to succeed Procurator Hieronymus Bottino, who died in 1871.

He was elected titular abbot of Santa Maria di Valdiponte, in 1878. His fame in Rome was remarked by pope Leo XIII, who sent him as apostolic delegate to Canada. He was accompanied by his secretary Dom Amadeus. After his return in Rome, he requested to retrait and he died there in 1892. He was buried in Campo Verano. His portrait is kept inside the Abbey of Bornem.
