= Anselm of Gembloux =

12th-century abbot

Anselm of Gembloux, Latinized Anselmus Gemblacensis (died 22 February 1136) was abbot of Gembloux Abbey 1115–1136, and continuator of the chronicle of Sigebert of Gembloux.

Before his election he had been scholaster at Hautvilliers Abbey (fr) and Lagny Abbey (fr). As abbot of Gembloux he had repairs carried out to the buildings and extended the monastery's revenues. He rebuilt the church at Mont-Saint-Guibert and in 1123 received a charter of liberties for the village from Godfrey II, Count of Louvain.

== Sources ==
- Index scriptorum novus Mediae Latinitatis: Ab anno DCCC usque ad annum MCC (Copenhagen, 1973), p. 27.
