= Exuperius negator =

Scientific classification
- Domain: Eukaryota
- Kingdom: Animalia
- Phylum: Arthropoda
- Class: Insecta
- Order: Lepidoptera
- Family: Pyralidae
- Subfamily: Phycitinae
- Genus: Exuperius; Heinrich, 1956
- Species: E. negator

Binomial name
- Exuperius negator Heinrich, 1956

Species of moth

Exuperius is a monotypic snout moth genus described by Carl Heinrich in 1956. Its only species, Exuperius negator, described in the same publication, is found in Peru.
