= Hemiksem =

- Municipality
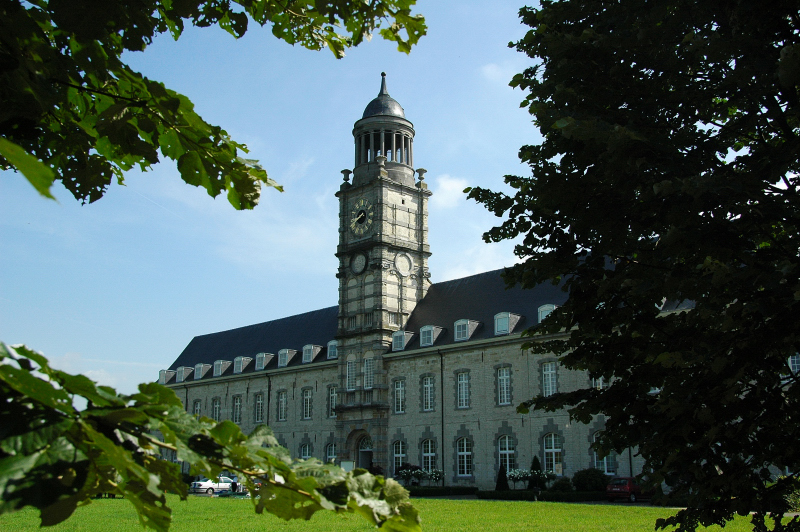
- Sint Bernardusabdij in Hemiksem

- Flag Coat of arms

- Location of Hemiksem in the province of Antwerp
- Interactive map of Hemiksem
- Location in Belgium
- Coordinates: 51°09′N 04°21′E
- Country: Belgium
- Community: Flemish Community
- Region: Flemish Region
- Province: Antwerp
- Arrondissement: Antwerp

Government
  - Mayor: Luc Bouckaert (CD&V)
  - Governing parties: CD&V, Vooruit

Area
  - Total: 5.48 km^{2} (2.12 sq mi)

Population (2025-01-01)
  - Total: 12,428
  - Density: 2,270/km^{2} (5,870/sq mi)
- Postal codes: 2620
- NIS code: 11018
- Area codes: 03
- Website: www.hemiksem.be

Hemiksem (Dutch pronunciation: [ˈɦeːmɪksɛm], historical spellings Heymissen and Hemixem) is a municipality located in the Belgian province of Antwerp. The municipality only comprises the town of Hemiksem proper. In 2021, Hemiksem had a total population of 11,722. The total area is 5.44 km^{2}.

== History ==
The village was first mentioned in 1155 as Hamincsem. In 1246, Cistercian monks established St. Bernard's Abbey, Hemiksem near the Scheldt, and became Lords of the heerlijkheid (landed estate) Hemiksem. The area used to be heavily forest. In 1358, the first brickworks was established, but it was an agricultural area until the 19th century. During the 19th century, Hemiksem started to industrialise and grow.

== Sights ==
The most notable sight in Hemiksem is the 13th century St. Bernard's Abbey, which now houses the town hall and police headquarters, after having undergone extensive renovations in the past decade.

== Gallery ==
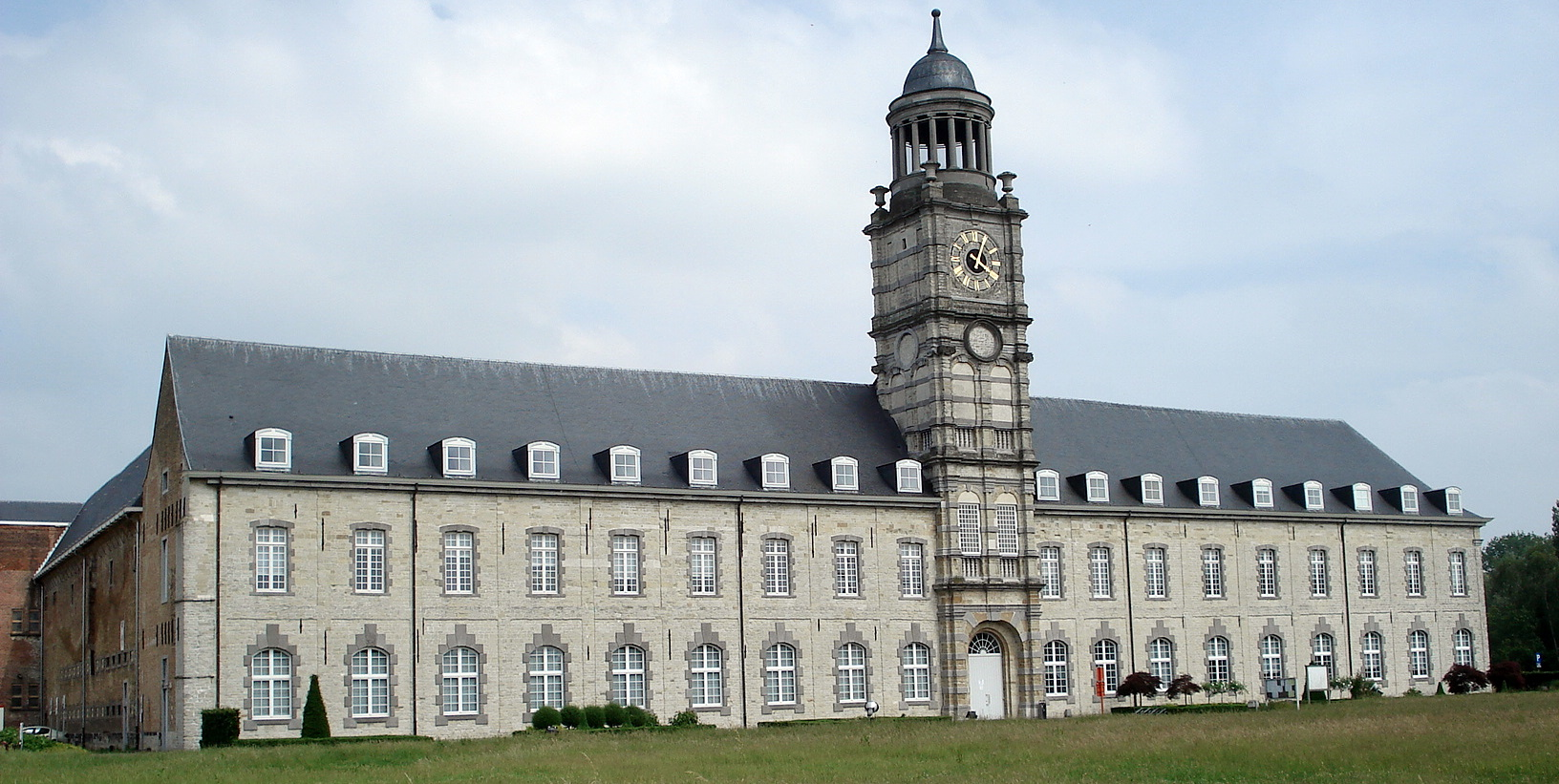
Former St. Bernards Abbey

Sunset over the river Scheldt seen from Hemiksem.

Photo taken at a Hemiksem fishing pond.

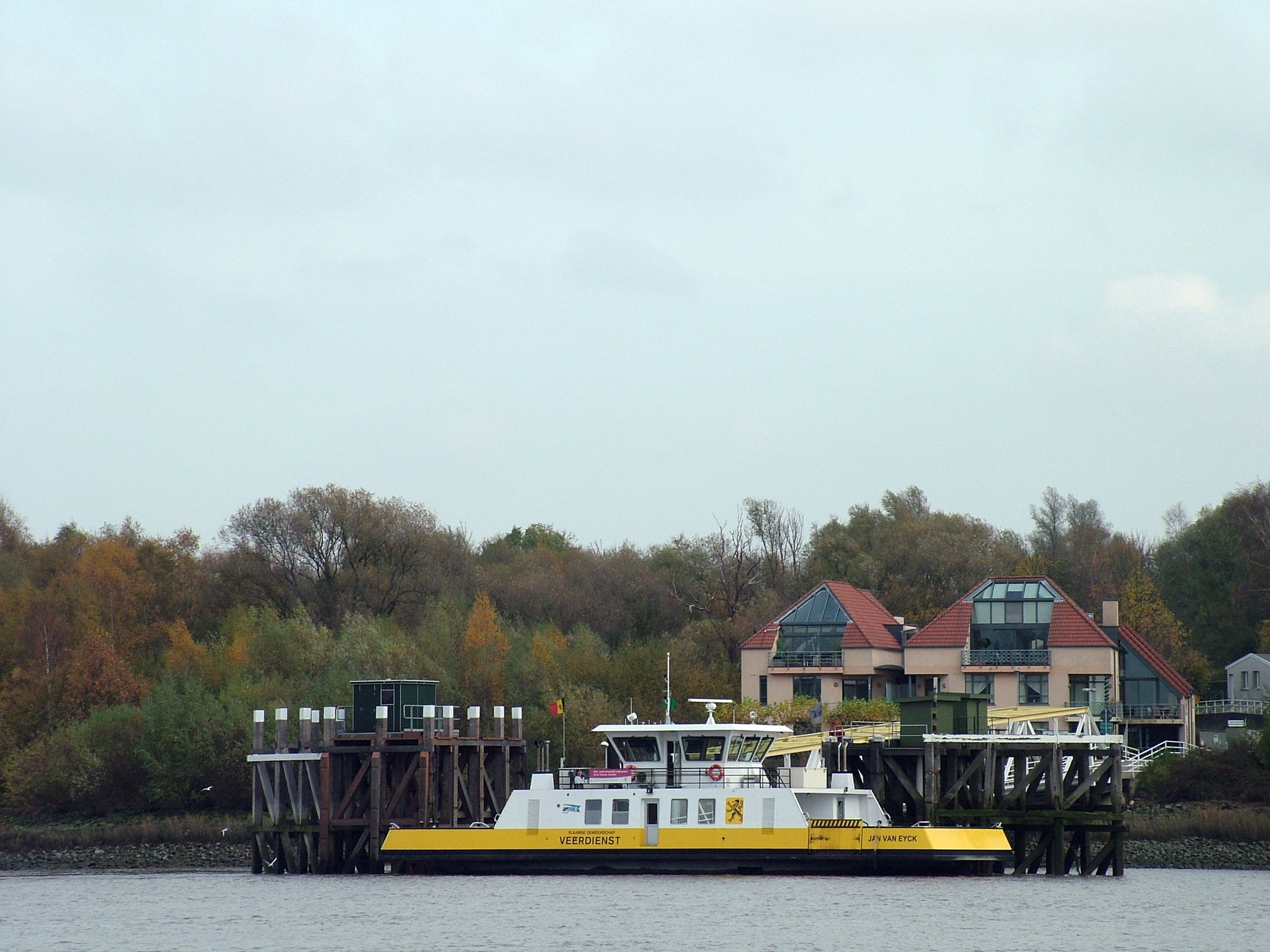
Ferry of Bazel-Hemiksem
