= Exuperius (Theban Legion) =

Christian saint and martyr (d. 286)

Saint Exuperius
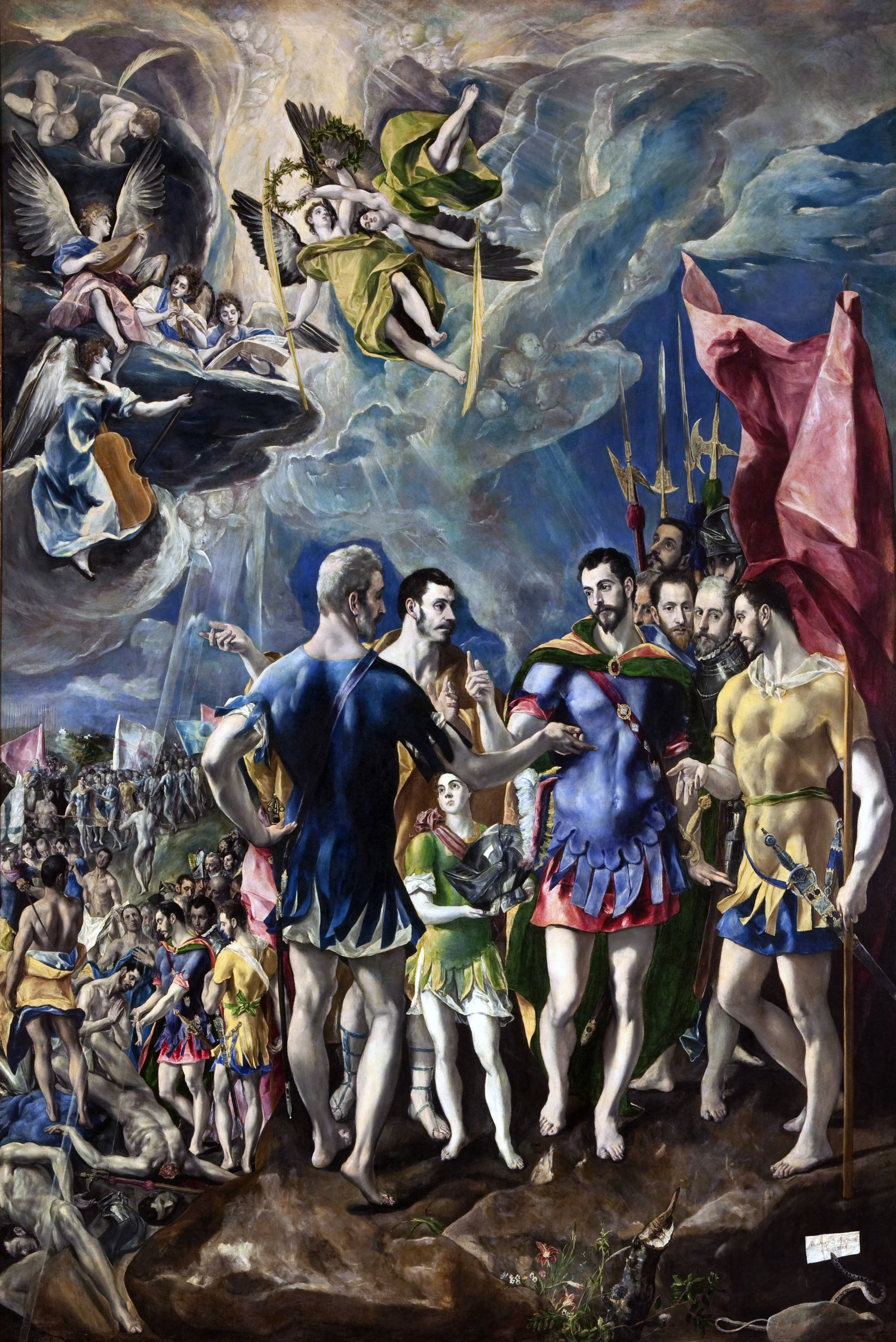
- El Greco, The Martyrdom of St Maurice.

Martyr
- Born: Africa?
- Died: 286 AD; Agaunum
- Venerated in: Roman Catholic Church
- Major shrine: formerly Gembloux Abbey
- Feast: 22 September
- Attributes: Military attire
- Patronage: Gembloux Abbey

Exuperius or Exupernis was the standard-bearer of the Theban Legion of ancient Roman Egypt. According to tradition, he was a companion of Saint Maurice, and is venerated as a saint and martyr by the Catholic Church.

== Veneration ==
Exuperius’ relics were translated in the 10th century to Gembloux Abbey. This translation was performed by the monastery's founder, Saint Guibert (Guibertus), who dedicated the monastery in honor of Saint Peter and Saint Exuperius. The saint thus enjoyed special veneration at Gembloux; Sigebert of Gembloux wrote a long poem on the martyrdom of the Theban Legion. The buildings of the abbey, which largely survived, are used for the Agronomical University of Gembloux.
