= Wicbert =

Medieval European saint

Wicbert or Guibert (892 – 23 May 962) was a nobleman who became a hermit and founded Gembloux Abbey. He was canonized as a saint in 1211. Saint Guibert's feast day is observed on 23 May.

An aristocrat from Lotharingia who had participated in several military campaigns, Guibert withdrew as a hermit on family property in Gembloux (formerly Gemblours) inherited from his father. In 936 he founded a fortified and almost independent monastery (having its own currency). The monastery was dedicated to St. Peter the Apostle and the holy martyr Exuperius.

Guibert was assisted in this by Erluin, who had resigned a canonry to become a monk. Some of Guibert's relatives impugned the legality of the monastic foundation on the plea that the monastery was built on fiscal land which had been given in fief to Guibert's ancestors and could not be alienated without imperial authority. Otto I, Holy Roman Emperor summoned Guibert and Erluin to his court, but was so favourably impressed with the manner in which they defended their pious undertaking that on 20 September, 946, he issued an imperial diploma approving the foundation of Gemblours and granting it various privileges.

Guibert appointed his friend Erluin first Abbot of Gemblours, while he himself become a monk at the monastery of Gorze near Metz. After his stay at Gorze Abbey in Lorraine, he returned in 954 when Hungarians invaders threatened to pillage the monastery. He brought with him the Rule of Saint Benedict for the monastery of Gembloux. He returned a second time in 957, when his brother-in-law Heribrand of Mawolt had seized the revenues of the monastery. He persuaded Heribrand to leave the possessions of the monastery unmolested in the future.

When Guibert died, in 962, the monks of Gembloux came to take back the corpse of their founder from the Abbey of Gorze. After burying the entrails of Guibert at the Abbey of Gorze, they treated the corpse with salt and herbs to prevent its decomposition during transportation to the Abbey of Gembloux, which became a place of pilgrimage.
