= States of Brabant =

Representation of the three estates to the court of the Duke of Brabant

The States of Brabant were the representation of the three estates (nobility, clergy and commons) to the court of the Duke of Brabant. The three estates were also called the States. Supported by the economic strength of the cities Antwerp, Brussels and Leuven, the States always were an important power before the rulers of the country, as was reflected by the charter of the duchy.

After the Duchy of Brabant and all Seventeen Provinces of the Netherlands came under the rule of the dukes of Burgundy, the States of Brabant became the host of the States-General of the Netherlands, who used to assemble in Brussels.

In 1579 and 1580, during the Eighty Years' War, most cities and States of Brabant joined Dutch independence declaration (Union of Utrecht and Act of Abjuration), but Spanish troops reconquered most of the territory of the duchy and restored Spanish Catholic rule (except for North Brabant. See also Siege of Antwerp (1584-1585)).

By the end of 1789, the States of Brabant again declared independence, this time from Austrian imperial rule, and, on January 11, 1790, they joined the United States of Belgium. All Southern Netherlands "States" disappeared four years later because of the French revolutionary occupation.

== Members of the First Estate ==
First Estate only Clergy members were allowed after imperial confirmation. They were the representative of the clerical members.

- Laurentius Metsius: bishop of 's-Hertogenbosch.
- De Nelis: Bishop of Antwerp.
- Cardinal de Franckenbergh.
- Lambert Hancart, OSB.: Abbot of Gembloux.
- Gregorius Thiels, OPraem.: Abbot of Averbode.
- Benedict Neefs, OCist.: Abbot of Hemiksem in 1780.
- Augustinus Wichmans, OPraem: Abbot of Tongerloo.
- Joannes Chrysostomus Teniers, O. Praem.: Abbot of St Michaels.
- Matthæus Yrsselius, O. Praem.: Abbot of St Michaels.
- Libertus de Pape, O. Praem.: Abbot of Park Abbey.
- Norbert Evrard Couwerven, O. Praem. in 1653.
- Jan Druys (Drusius), O. Praem: Abbot of Park, since 1604.
- Joannes Maes (Masius), O. Praem: Abbot of Park, since 1645.
- Jean-Baptiste de Haeseleer, O. Praem: Abbot of van Dillegem.
- Gerardus Rubens, O Cist.: Abbot of Hemiksem.
- Antoine de Granvelle, OSB: Abbot of Affligem.
- Goswin Herdinck, OSB: Abbot of Affligem.
- Jan t'Serjacobs, OSB: Abbot of Affligem.

== Members of the Second State ==
These members belonged to the high nobility of the country.

- The Duke of Hoboken; hereditary Marshall of Brabant.
- The Duke of Aerschot.
- The Prince of Grimberghen.
- Prince de Gavre; (Marquess of Ayseau).
- The Marquess of Wemmel.
- The Marquess of Ittre.
- The Count of Liberchies (admission in 1759).
- Count d'Argenteau; (Count of Donghelbergh).
- The Count of Nassau-Corroy.
- Count de Merode; (Baron of Duffel);
- Count de Lalaing; (Count of Tildonck).
- The Baron of Moriensart, Count of Coloma.
- the Baron of Herent.
- the Baron of Vremde.
- the Baron of Carloo.
- the Baron of Schoonhoven.
- The Baron of Lichtaert.
- the Baron of St-Pierre-Leeuw.
- the Baron of Pellenbergh.
- the Baron of Duffel.
- the Baron of Molembais.
- the Baron of Incourt.
- the Baron of Hooghvorst.
- The Lord Mayor of Louvain.
- the lord Mayor of Antwerp.
