= Erluin (nobleman) =

Erluin was a ninth-century Carolingian nobleman who became prefect of the palace at Ingelheim.

In 860 he was at Lorsch Abbey with Count Megingoz to witness a donation of land. Louis the German later appointed him to settle boundary disputes concerning royal benefices on the Rhine. Flodoard's Historia Remensis Ecclesiae (history of the church of Rheims) praises him for defending the rights of Rheims in the Rhineland, for which he received gifts of silver from the archbishop. In a charter for the Abbey of Fulda, dated 874, he is mentioned as aulicus praeses and his name precedes those of the imperial counts.
