= Bornem Abbey =

Monastery building in Bornem, Belgium

Coordinates: 51.0937°N 4.2262°E

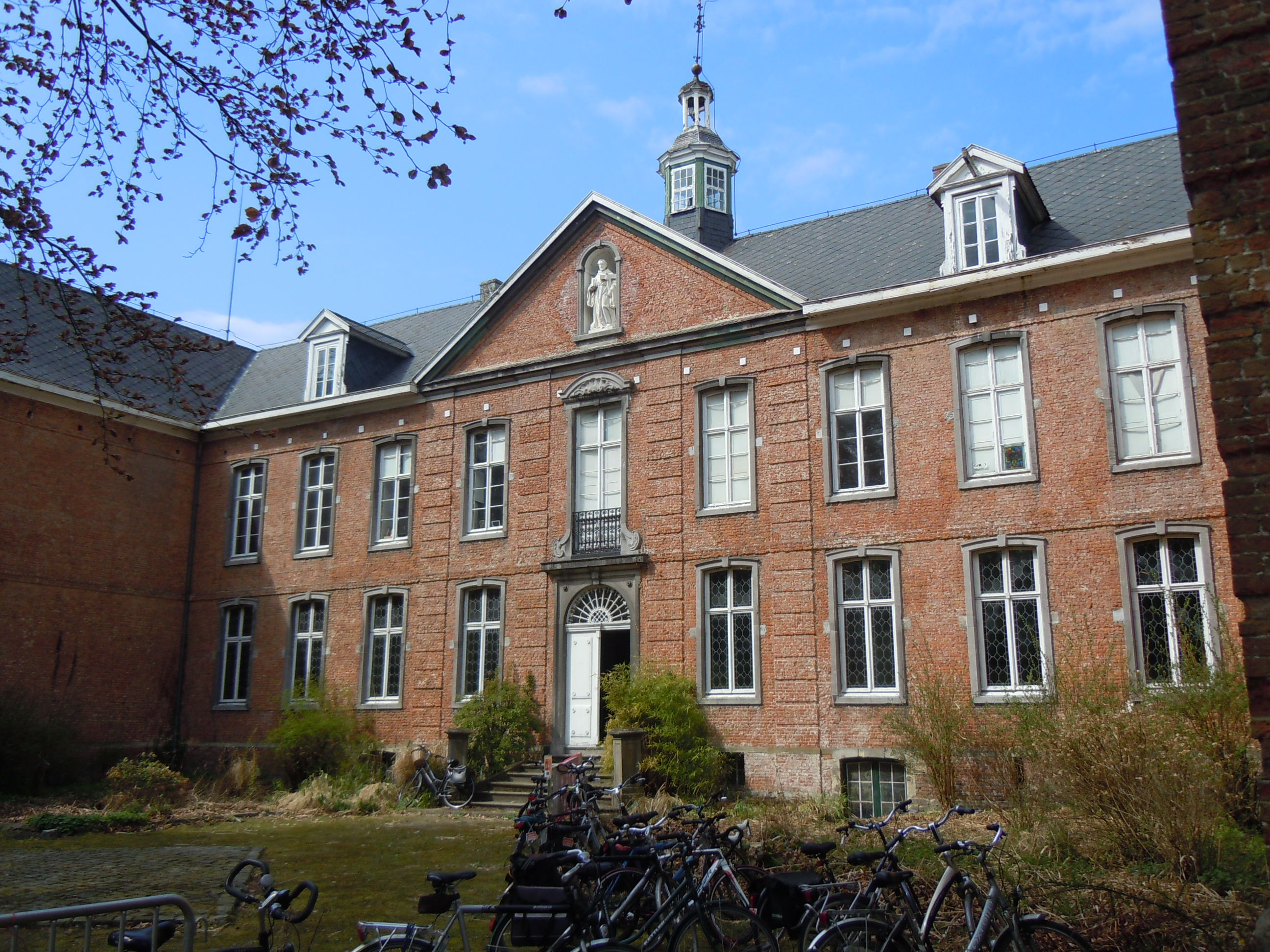
Facade of the abbey

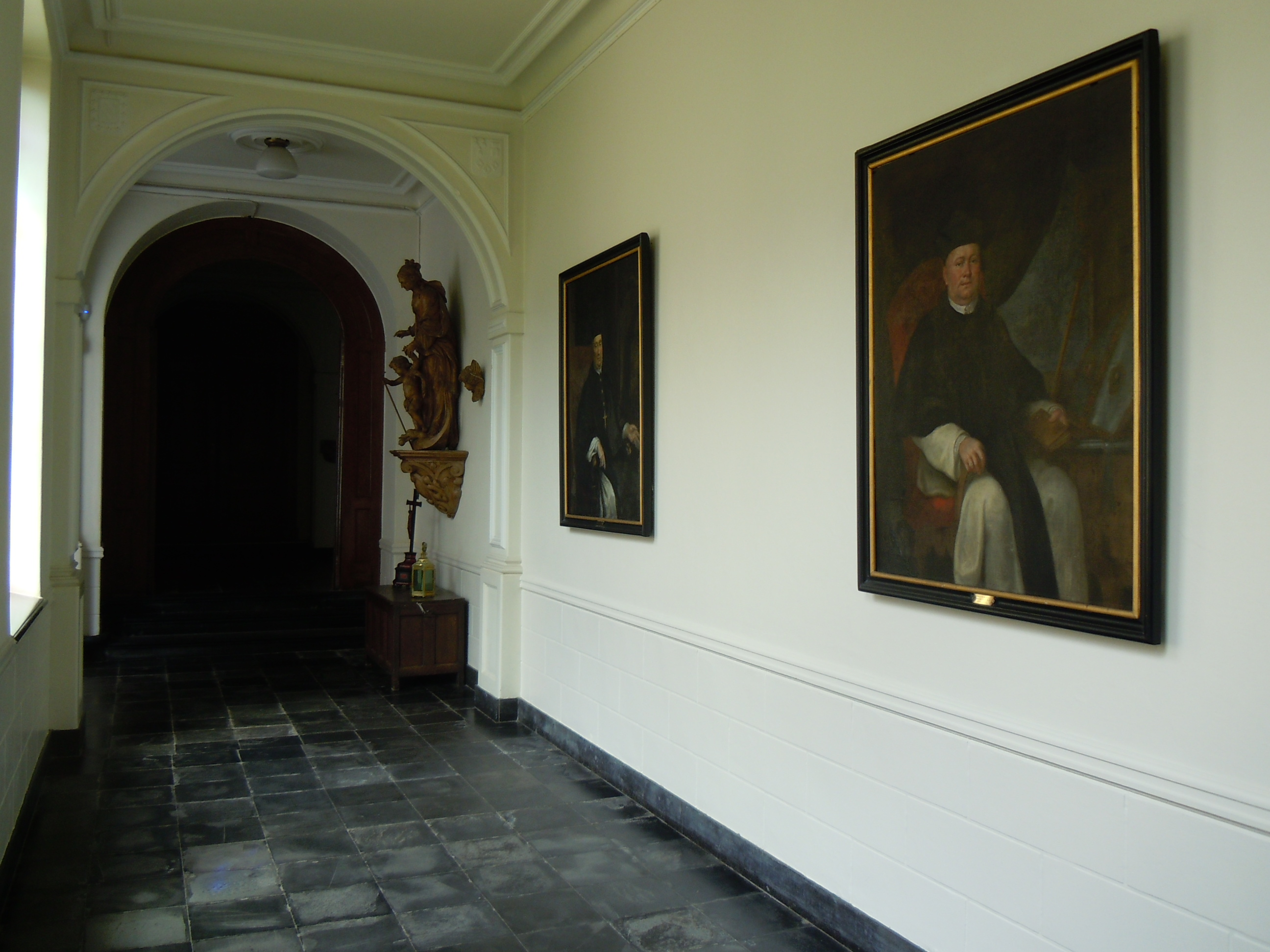
Cloister

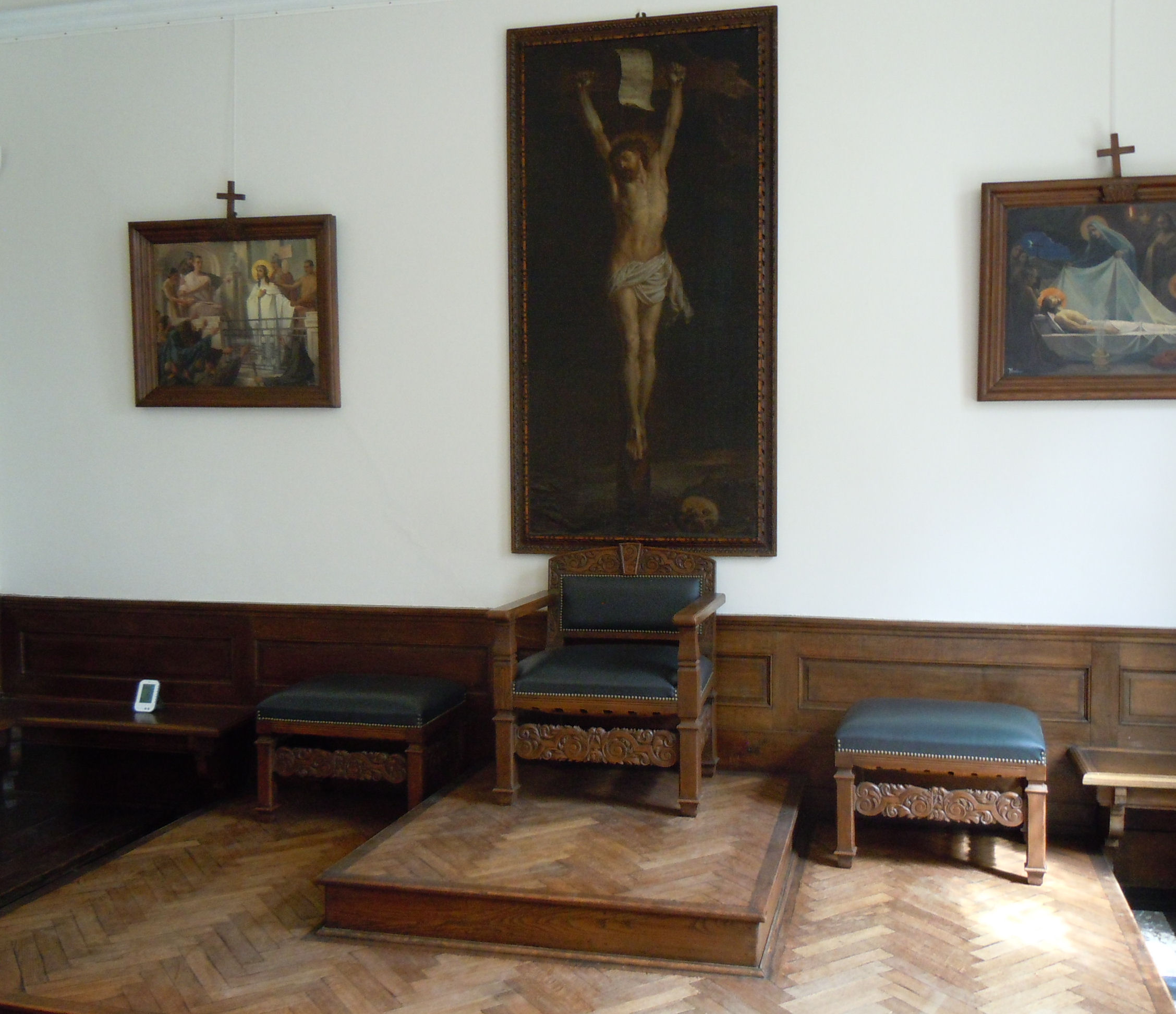
Chapterhouse of the abbey

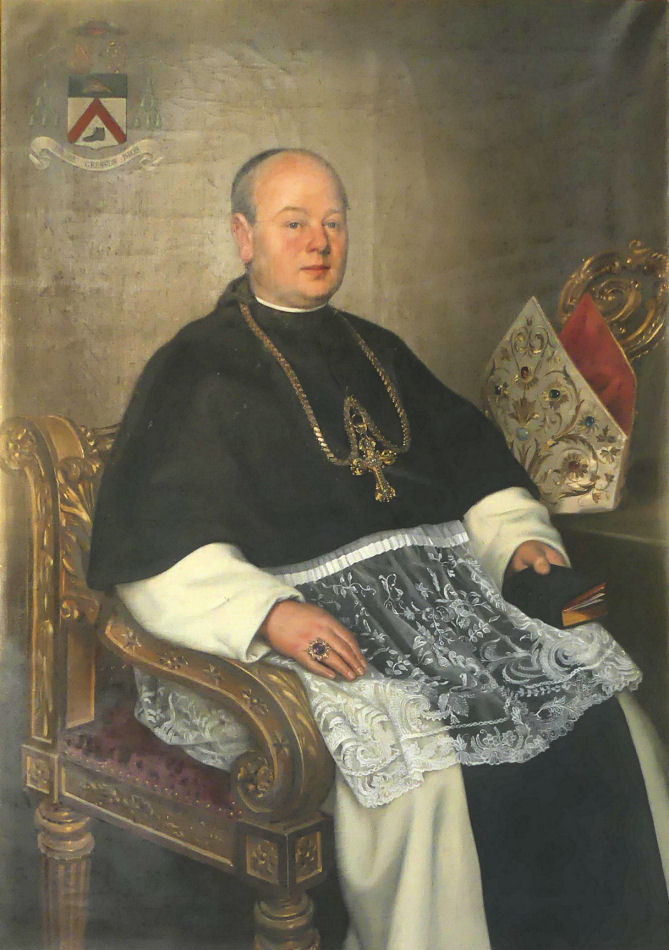
Portrait of Thomas Schoen (abbot 1901–1934) by Jean-Baptiste Anthony, 1934

Bornem Abbey is the only Cistercian abbey of Common Observance in the Archdiocese of Mechelen-Brussels. The current abbey is the successor of the former St. Bernard's Abbey, Hemiksem, destroyed in the French Revolution. Both are built in honour of Saint Bernard of Clairvaux.

== History ==
The original foundation was made by Don Pedro Coloma, Baron of Bornhem, who established a convent of the Canons Regular of the Order of the Holy Cross. The current buildings date from the 18th to the 19th century. The abbey and the church are protected heritage.

During the French Revolution the buildings were sold, at the same time monastic life of Hemiksem was destroyed. In the 19th century the abbey resurrected thanks to the support of Cardinal Mauro Cappellari (later Pope Gregory XVI), the old monks of Hemiksem returned in Bornem. In 1835 Mgr Corselis gave the new monastic community the same rights as the old Abbey of Hemiksem. The first abbot, Robertus van Ommeren, was ordained in Rome. The monastic life flourished and the abbey refounded Val-Dieu Abbey in 1844.

During the First World War the abbey becomes a strategic point in the defence of Klein-Brabant. In 1914 the abbey church tower was used as a lookout, and a target of the German artillery. At the end of battle the tower stood as the last major strategic point in Bornem.

The community is active in the local parish of Bornem and of great importance of local cultural life. The monks have an abbey beer, named Bornem, which is brewed by Brouwerij Van Steenberge. However at the end of the 20th century the number of monks decreased drastically and today only two monks, including Abbot van Schaverbeeck are living in the conventual buildings. In 2014 the abbey was bought by the city of Bornem. In 1998 a monument for Pedro Coloma was erected in front of the main entrance.

== Library ==
The historical library contains 3,000 books that could be saved form the old library of Hemisksem Abbey. Dom Henri was librarian between 1858 and 1865 and took care of the old collection. The abbey is still famous for its collection of valuable books of Cistercian history. The current collection contains 30,000 books and manuscripts and other important valuable works from the 14th century.

== Abbots ==
1. Robertus van Ommeren
2. Amadeus de Bie : 74th Abbot-General of the Cistercian Order.
3. Thomas Schoen
4. Godefridus Indewey
5. Eugenius Dirckx
6. Robertus Peeters
7. Gerardus Wassenberg
8. Edmundus Van Dam
9. Leo Van Schaverbeeck

== Notable monks ==
- Henricus Smeulders : Apostolic Commissioner to Canada (1883-1884).
- Benedictus Van Doninck : Abbot of Val-Dieu Abbey.
