= Erluin I of Gembloux =

Benedictine monk

Erluin (died 987) was a Benedictine monk, the first abbot of Gembloux (946–87) and also briefly the abbot of Lobbes (956–57). Diametrically opposed accounts of his character are given by the partisans of Gembloux and Lobbes.

The Abbey of Gembloux was founded on lands donated by Guibert and confirmed by King Otto I in 946. Erluin was its first abbot. He continued as its abbot even during his abbacy at Lobbes.

Since 889, the royal Abbey of Lobbes had been administered on behalf of the crown by the bishops of Liège, who held the office of abbot, although the monks continued to elect their own provost (praepositus) per the Rule of Saint Benedict. In 956, the provost was Blitard, while the lay abbacy was in the hands of Reginar III of Hainaut, who had received his appointment from his nephew, Bishop Balderic. Through a series of manoeuvres, Reginar and Erluin got Blitard ejected from the monastery and Erluin appointed in his place, contrary to the Rule of Saint Benedict. In 957, Erluin was promoted to full abbot and the rule of the bishops of Liège came to an end.

Folcuin, in his Deeds of the Abbots of Lobbes, (Note: Latin: Gesta abbatum Lobiensium.) says that Erluin was hated by the monks because he was considered a close friend of Count Reginar. On Christmas Day, 956, he held a banquet for the count, the countess, the bishop and their friends, to which he did not invite the monks. Folcuin accuses the party of desecrating the church. Erluin apparently compounded the offence by trying to sell the harvest of the village of Biesmerée to pay for the festivities. The controversy over Biesmerée was the incitement for the subsequent physical assault on Erluin by some of the monks.

On the night of 20 October 957, three young monks of Lobbes assaulted Erluin, ripping him from his bed and taking him outside the cloister, where they gouged out his eyes and cut out part of his tongue. Although it was not unknown for monks to resort to violence to rid themselves of a hated abbot, contemporaries regarded the attack on Erluin as excessively brutal. The perpetrators probably intended to physically remove Erluin from participation in the lectio divina, which required both eyes and tongue. According to Folcuin, Erluin hoped to be martyred, but when the monks refused to oblige, he took a boat up the river to Gembloux during the night. With his tongue only partially removed, Erluin retained some ability to speak.

Sigebert, the historian of Gembloux, in his Deeds of the Abbots of Gembloux, (Note: Latin: Gesta abbatum Gemblacensium.) includes an account of Erluin's abbacy at Lobbes with the express purpose of "correcting" the account of Folcuin. According to Sigebert, Erluin took the abbacy of Lobbes with the intent of reforming the community and was aware of the risks of going there. He describes the three men who attacked Erluin as "vain nobility in the firmness of youth". Many of the monks at Lobbes came from the high nobility, since the abbey was a prestigious royal foundation.

In 958, Archbishop Bruno of Cologne, who was also Duke of Lotharingia, forced Count Reginar into exile. A new abbot, Aletran, also from Gembloux, was appointed to Lobbes and began to reform the community.

Erluin remained as abbot of Gembloux until his death in 987, when he was succeeded by his brother Heriward.

== Sources ==
- De Jong, Mayke (1995). "Carolingian Monasticism: The Power of Prayer". In Rosamond McKitterick (ed.). The New Cambridge Medieval History: Volume 2, c.700–c.900. Cambridge: Cambridge University Press. pp. 622–53.
- Wade, Susan (2009). "Abbot Erluin's Blindness: The Monastic Implications of Violent Loss of Sight". In Katherine Smith; Scott Wells (eds.). Negotiating Community and Difference in Medieval Europe: Gender, Power, Patronage and the Authority of Religion in Latin Christendom. Leiden: Brill. pp. 207–22.
