= Sigebert of Gembloux =

Medieval author

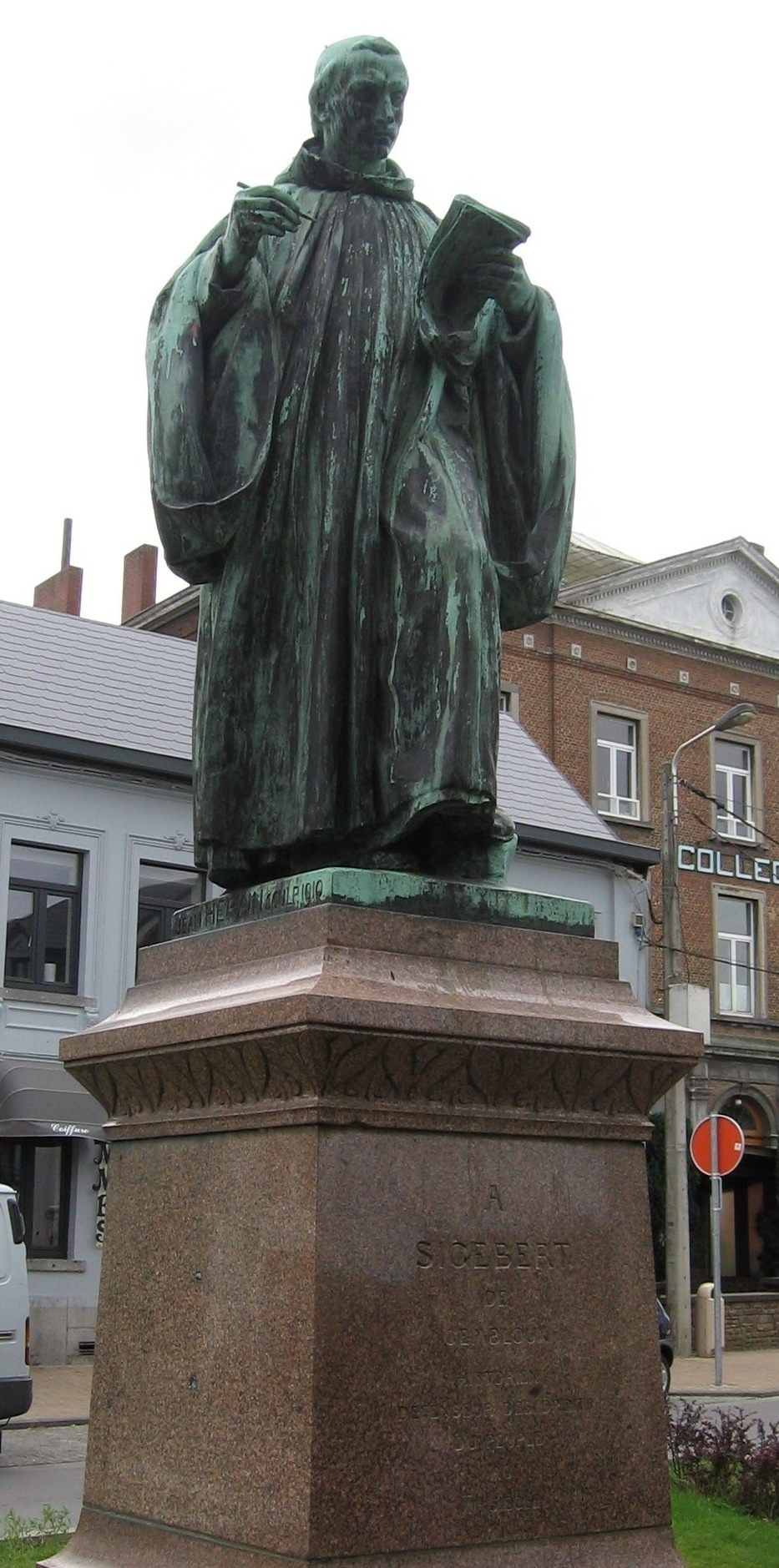
Statue of Sigebert of Gembloux in Gembloux, Belgium

Sigebert or Sigibert of Gembloux (Latin: Sigebertus or Sigibertus Gemblacensis; c. 1030 – 5 October 1112) was a medieval author, known mainly as a pro-Imperial historian of a universal chronicle, opposed to the expansive papacy of Gregory VII and Pascal II. Early in his life he became a monk in the Benedictine abbey of Gembloux, now situated in Belgium.

== Life ==
He was born near Gembloux which is now in the Province of Namur, Belgium, about 1030. He was apparently not of Germanic background, but seems to have been of Latin descent. He received his education at the Abbey of Gembloux, where at an early age he became a monk. Later he was for a long time a teacher at the Abbey of St. Vincent at Metz in eastern France; about 1070 he returned to Gembloux. He was universally admired, and had charge there of the abbey school until his death, occupied in teaching and writing.

After his return from Metz he became a violent imperial partisan in the great struggle between the empire and the papacy that culminated in the Investiture Controversy. He was an enemy of the papal pretensions and he took part in the momentous contest between Pope Gregory VII and the Emperor Henry IV. Of his three treatises on this question, being very serviceable to the imperial cause to the contest, one is lost; this was an answer to the letter of Gregory VII, written in 1081 to Bishop Hermann of Metz, in which Gregory asserted that the popes have the right to excommunicate kings and to release subjects from the oath of loyalty. In the second treatise Sigebert defended the masses said by married priests, the hearing of which had been forbidden by the pope in 1074. When Paschal II in 1103 ordered the Count of Flanders to punish the citizens of Liège for their adherence to the emperor and to take up arms against him, Sigebert attacked the proceeding of the pope as unchristian and contrary to Scripture.

He died at Gembloux on 5 November 1112.

== Works ==
Sigebert's most celebrated work is the Chronicon sive Chronographia ("Chronicle or Chronography"), a universal chronicle that Auguste Molinier found to be the best work of its kind. It contains many errors and little original information. He desired probably merely to give a chronological survey; consequently, there is only a bare list of events even for the era in which he lived, though the last years, including 1105–1111, are treated in more detail. It covers the period between 381 and 1111, and its author was evidently a man of much learning. The work became in time, the principal source of information with reference to the churches and abbeys of Belgium and Northern France. The first of many printed editions was published in 1513; the best is in Monumenta Germaniae Historica: Scriptores Vol. VI, with introduction by Ludwig Conrad Bethmann. After Sigebert's death his chronicle was continued by Anselm of Gembloux.

The chronicle was very popular during the later Middle Ages; it gained a very high reputation, was circulated in numberless copies, and was used by many writers and found numerous continuators, serving as the basis of many later works of history. Notwithstanding various oversights and mistakes, the industry and wide reading of Sigebert deserve honorable mention. The original autograph manuscript is in the Royal Library of Belgium.

Other works by Sigebert are a life of the Frankish king Sigebert III (Vita Sigeberti III regis Austrasiae), founder of the monastery of St. Martin at Metz. While at Metz he wrote the biography of Bishop Theodoric I of Metz (964–985), and also a long poem on the martyrdom of St. Lucy, whose relics were venerated at the Abbey of St. Vincent. After his return to Gembloux he also wrote similar works for this abbey, namely a long poem on the martyrdom of the Theban Legion—as Gembloux had relics of its reputed leader St. Exuperius (d. 262)—and a history of the early abbots of Gembloux to 1048 (Gesta abbatum Gemblacensium), which was continued by Gottschalk of Gembloux.

He also made a catalogue of one hundred and seventy-one ecclesiastical writers and their works from Gennadius to his own time, De scriptoribus ecclesiasticis, which mentions his own work.

Sigebert was also a hagiographer. Among his writings in this connexion may be mentioned revisions of the biographies of St. Maclovius and the two early bishops of Liège, Theodard of Maastricht and Lambert of Maastricht; further the vita of Dietrich, bishop of Metz (d. 984) who was the founder of the abbey of St Vincent in that city (Vita Deoderici, Mettensis episcopi) and of Wicbert or Guibert (d. 962) who founded the abbey of Gembloux (Vita Wicberti) in what is now Belgium.
